= List of Human Powered Vehicle Challenge results =

Student design competition results

This is a list of Human Powered Vehicle Challenge winners.

== 2002–2024 ==
=== 2002 ===
==== East ====
Hosts: Virginia Polytechnic Institute & Virginia State University, Blacksburg, VA
Rank	Single				Multi				Utility		
Rank	Design	Sprint	Endurance	Overall	Design	Sprint	Endurance	Overall	Design	Utility Race	Overall
1st	Missouri University of Science and Technology		Lafayette College	Missouri University of Science and Technology	Virginia Tech	University of Florida			University of Alabama	Wright State University	University of Alabama
2nd	University of Central Florida	Clarkson University	University at Buffalo	Lafayette College	University of Florida	Virginia Tech			Virginia Tech	University of Florida	University of Florida
3rd	Lafayette College	Wright State University	Missouri University of Science and Technology	Clarkson University	n/a				Wright State University	Virginia Tech	Wright State University

==== West ====
Host: University of Nevada, Reno
Rank	Single				Multi				Utility		
Rank	Design	Sprint	Endurance	Overall	Design	Sprint	Endurance	Overall	Design	Utility Race	Overall
1st	Michigan Technological University	California Polytechnic State University San Luis Obispo			University of Nevada, Las Vegas	LeTourneau University		University of Nevada, Las Vegas	LeTourneau University	South Dakota Schools of Mines and Technology	LeTourneau University
2nd	Colorado State University	Missouri University of Science and Technology	Montana Tech		University of Denver	University of Nevada, Las Vegas		LeTourneau University	South Dakota Schools of Mines and Technology	LeTourneau University	South Dakota Schools of Mines and Technology
3rd	Montana Tech	California State University Chico	University of Nevada, Reno	Colorado State University	LeTourneau University	University of Denver			University of Denver	Seattle University	

=== 2003 ===
==== East ====
Host: Missouri University of Science and Technology
Rank	Single				Multi				Utility		
Rank	Design	Sprint	Endurance	Overall	Design	Sprint	Endurance	Overall	Design	Utility Race	Overall
1st	University of South Dakota	Missouri University of Science and Technology			Virginia Tech	University of Florida			University of Buffalo		
2nd	Missouri University of Science and Technology	*Fairfield University*Clarkson University*University at Buffalo	University at Buffalo		Wright State University	Virginia Tech	Wright State University	Virginia Tech	Wright State University	Virginia Tech	Wright State University
3rd	Clarkson University	n/a	Case Western Reserve University	Fairfield University	University of Florida	Wright State University	Virginia Tech	Wright State University	Virginia Tech	Wright State University	Virginia Tech

*Indicates a tie

==== West ====
Host: University of California, Davis
Rank	Single				Multi				Utility		
Rank	Design	Sprint	Endurance	Overall	Design	Sprint	Endurance	Overall	Design	Utility Race	Overall
1st	Colorado State University	California Polytechnic State University, San Luis Obispo	Colorado State University		University of Idaho	University of Denver			Colorado State University	University of Oklahoma	
2nd	Michigan Technological University	Colorado State University	California Polytechnic State University, San Luis Obispo	Montana Tech	University of Idaho				University of Oklahoma	California State University, Long Beach	Colorado State University
3rd	Montana Tech	*Montana Tech *San Jose State University	Montana Tech	California Polytechnic State University, San Luis Obispo	University of Denver	University of Idaho			Michigan Technological University	California State University, Fullerton	California State University, Long Beach

*Indicates a tie

=== 2004 ===
==== East ====
Host: University of Alabama, Tuscaloosa
Rank	Single				Multi				Utility		
Rank	Design	Sprint	Endurance	Overall	Design	Sprint	Endurance	Overall	Design	Utility Race	Overall
1st	Missouri University of Science and Technology		Lafayette College	Missouri University of Science and Technology	Virginia Tech	University of Florida			University of Alabama	Wright State University	University of Alabama
2nd	University of Central Florida	Clarkson University	University at Buffalo	Lafayette College	University of Florida	Virginia Tech			Virginia Tech	University of Florida	
3rd	Lafayette College	Wright State University	Missouri University of Science and Technology	Clarkson University	n/a				Wright State University	Virginia Tech	Wright State University

==== West ====
Host: Oregon State University
Rank	Single				Multi				Utility		
Rank	Design	Sprint	Endurance	Overall	Design	Sprint	Endurance	Overall	Design	Utility Race	Overall
1st	Michigan Technological University	California Polytechnic State University San Luis Obispo			University of Nevada, Las Vegas	LeTourneau University		University of Nevada, Las Vegas	LeTourneau University	South Dakota Schools of Mines and Technology	LeTourneau University
2nd	Colorado State University	Missouri University of Science and Technology	Montana Tech		University of Denver	University of Nevada, Las Vegas		LeTourneau University	South Dakota Schools of Mines and Technology	LeTourneau University	South Dakota Schools of Mines and Technology
3rd	Montana Tech	California State University Chico	University of Nevada, Reno	Colorado State University	LeTourneau University	University of Denver			University of Denver	Seattle University	

=== 2005 ===
==== East ====
Host: University of Alabama, Tuscaloosa
Rank	Single				Multi				Utility		
Rank	Design	Sprint	Endurance	Overall	Design	Sprint	Endurance	Overall	Design	Utility Race	Overall
1st	Michigan Technological University	Missouri University of Science and Technology			University of Alabama	University of Florida			Wright State University		University of Oklahoma
2nd	Missouri University of Science and Technology	Clarkson University	Northern Illinois University	University of Oklahoma	University of Florida	Wright State University			University of Oklahoma		Wright State University
3rd	Polytechnic University of Puerto Rico	Polytechnic University of Puerto Rico	Marquette University	Polytechnic University of Puerto Rico	Wright State University	University of Alabama			University of Alabama	University of Florida	Wright State University

==== West ====
Host: California State University, Fresno
Rank	Single				Multi				Utility		
Rank	Design	Sprint	Endurance	Overall	Design	Sprint	Endurance	Overall	Design	Utility Race	Overall
1st	Missouri University of Science and Technology	California Polytechnic State University San Luis Obispo	California State University Chico	California Polytechnic State University San Luis Obispo	University of Nevada Las Vegas				Colorado State University	Seattle University	
2nd	California Polytechnic State University San Luis Obispo	Missouri University of Science and Technology	California Polytechnic State University San Luis Obispo	Missouri University of Science and Technology	University of Arizona				Seattle University	California State University Fresno	Colorado State University
3rd	Colorado State University	University of Nevada Reno	Oregon State University	California State University Chico	n/a				South Dakota School of Mines and Technology	Central Washington University	

=== 2006 ===
==== East ====
Host: University of North Carolina, Charlotte
Rank	Single				Multi				Utility		
Rank	Design	Sprint	Endurance	Overall	Design	Sprint	Endurance	Overall	Design	Utility Race	Overall
1st	Milwaukee School of Engineering	Missouri University of Science and Technology			Wright State University	Iowa State University			Wright State University	National Yunlin University of Science and Technology	
2nd	Missouri University of Science and Technology	University of Missouri Kansas City	Rose–Hulman Institute of Technology	University of Missouri Kansas City	Iowa State University	Wright State University			National Yunlin University of Science and Technology	United States Naval Academy	
3rd	University of Missouri Kansas City	Clarkson University	University of Missouri Kansas City	Milwaukee School of Engineering	n/a				United States Naval Academy	Wright State University	

==== West ====
Host: California Polytechnic State University, San Luis Obispo
Rank	Single				Multi				Utility		
Rank	Design	Sprint	Endurance	Overall	Design	Sprint	Endurance	Overall	Design	Utility Race	Overall
1st	California Polytechnic State University San Luis Obispo	California State University Chico			University of Arizona				Colorado State University		
2nd	California State University Chico	Missouri University of Science and Technology			n/a				University of Nevada Reno		
3rd	Missouri University of Science and Technology	Portland State University	Oregon State University	Portland State University	n/a				Seattle University		

=== 2007 ===
==== East ====
Host: University of Central Florida
Rank	Single				Multi				Utility		
Rank	Design	Sprint	Endurance	Overall	Design	Sprint	Endurance	Overall	Design	Utility Race	Overall
1st	Missouri University of Science and Technology				Iowa State University				University of Wisconsin Madison	Iowa State University	
2nd	University of Central Florida	Franklin W. Olin College of Engineering	Rose–Hulman Institute of Technology		Rose–Hulman Institute of Technology	n/a		Rose–Hulman Institute of Technology	Iowa State University	Wright State University	
3rd	Rose–Hulman Institute of Technology		Marquette University	University of Central Florida	n/a				Wright State University	West Virginia University	University of Wisconsin Madison

==== West ====
Hosts: NASA Ames Research Center / San Jose State University
Rank	Single				Multi				Utility		
Rank	Design	Sprint	Endurance	Overall	Design	Sprint	Endurance	Overall	Design	Utility Race	Overall
1st	South Dakota Schools of Mines and Technology	California Polytechnic State University San Luis Obispo	Missouri University of Science and Technology		n/a				Colorado State University		
2nd	Missouri University of Science and Technology		Oregon State University	California Polytechnic State University San Luis Obispo	n/a				University of Oklahoma	California State University Fresno	University of Oklahoma
3rd	California Polytechnic State University San Luis Obispo	California State University Chico	California Polytechnic State University San Luis Obispo	Portland State University	n/a				University of Nevada Reno	Seattle University	California State University Fresno

=== 2008 ===
==== East ====
Host: University of Wisconsin–Madison
Rank	Single				Multi				Utility		
Rank	Design	Sprint	Endurance	Overall	Design	Sprint	Endurance	Overall	Design	Utility Race	Overall
1st	Grove City College	Rose–Hulman Institute of Technology	Missouri University of Science and Technology	Rose–Hulman Institute of Technology	Iowa State University	Drexel University	Iowa State University		Grove City College	Wright State University	Grove City College
2nd	University of Central Florida	Missouri University of Science and Technology	Rose–Hulman Institute of Technology	Missouri University of Science and Technology	Wright State University	Iowa State University	Wright State University		Iowa State University		
3rd	Rose–Hulman Institute of Technology	University of Iowa	South Dakota Schools of Mines and Technology	Marquette University	Drexel University	Wright State University	Drexel University		University of Oklahoma	Grove City College	Wright State University

==== West ====
Host: Portland State University
Rank	Single				Multi				Utility		
Rank	Design	Sprint	Endurance	Overall	Design	Sprint	Endurance	Overall	Design	Utility Race	Overall
1st	Rose–Hulman Institute of Technology		California State University Chico	Rose–Hulman Institute of Technology	Northern Arizona University				Seattle University	Colorado State University	Seattle University
2nd	California Polytechnic State University San Luis Obispo		Missouri University of Science and Technology		n/a				Missouri University of Science and Technology	San Jose State University	Colorado State University
3rd	Missouri University of Science and Technology	California State University Chico	Rose–Hulman Institute of Technology	Portland State University	n/a				University of Nevada Reno		

=== 2009 ===
==== East ====
Host: Drexel University
Rank	Single				Multi				Utility		
Rank	Design	Sprint	Drag Race	Overall	Design	Sprint	Drag Race	Overall	Design	Utility Race	Overall
1st	Rose–Hulman Institute of Technology	Missouri University of Science and Technology	*	Rose–Hulman Institute of Technology	Grove City College		*	Grove City College	Grove City College		
2nd	Missouri University of Science and Technology	Rose–Hulman Institute of Technology	Rose–Hulman Institute of Technology	Missouri University of Science and Technology	Iowa State University	Drexel University	*	Iowa State University	University of Wisconsin Madison	Iowa State University	University of Wisconsin Madison
3rd	University of Central Florida	Central Connecticut State University	*	Franklin W. Olin College of Engineering	Drexel University	Iowa State University	*	Drexel University	Arkansas State		Ferris State University

* Indicates Unknown

==== West ====
Host: Portland State University
Rank	Single				Multi				Utility		
Rank	Design	Sprint	Endurance	Overall	Design	Sprint	Endurance	Overall	Design	Utility Race	Overall
1st	Rose–Hulman Institute of Technology		California State University Northridge	Rose–Hulman Institute of Technology	San Jose State University				Colorado State University	University of Nevada Reno	Colorado State University
2nd	California Polytechnic State University San Luis Obispo				n/a				Seattle University	Colorado State University	University of Nevada Reno
3rd	Missouri University of Science and Technology				n/a				California State University Chico	South Dakota Schools of Mines and Technology	Seattle University

=== 2010 ===
==== East ====
Host: Central Connecticut State University
Rank	Speed Class					Unrestricted Class					
Rank	Design	Endurance	Women's Sprint	Men's Sprint	Overall	Design	Speed Endurance	Utility Endurance	Women's Sprint	Men's Sprint	Overall
1st	Missouri University of Science and Technology					Rose-Hulman Institute of Technology					
2nd	Franklin W. Olin College of Engineering	University of Toronto			Franklin W. Olin College of Engineering	Ohio Northern University	University of Wisconsin, Madison	Drexel University	University of Wisconsin, Madison	Drexel University	University of Wisconsin Madison
3rd	University of Central Florida	Dalhousie University		Franklin W. Olin College of Engineering	University of Toronto	University of Wisconsin, Madison	University of Texas, Pan American	Ferris State University	Drexel University	University of Texas, Pan American	Ohio Northern University

==== West ====
Host: California State University, Northridge
Rank	Speed Class					Unrestricted Class					
Rank	Design	Endurance	Women's Sprint	Men's Sprint	Overall	Design	Speed Endurance	Utility Endurance	Women's Sprint	Men's Sprint	Overall
1st	Missouri University of Science and Technology					Rose–Hulman Institute of Technology	Portland State University	Rose–Hulman Institute of Technology	Colorado State University		Rose–Hulman Institute of Technology
2nd	California State University Northridge	California State University Chico		South Dakota School of Mines and Technology		Grove City College	Rose-Hulman Institute of Technology	Grove City College	Portland State University		Portland State University
3rd	University of California Riverside	South Dakota School of Mines and Technology	Northern Arizona University	California State University Chico	California State University Northridge	Portland State University	Colorado State University	Portland State University	Rose–Hulman Institute of Technology	University of Nevada Reno	Colorado State University

=== 2011 ===
==== East ====
Host: Rose–Hulman Institute of Technology
Rank	Speed Class					Unrestricted Class					
Rank	Design	Endurance	Women's Sprint	Men's Sprint	Overall	Design	Speed Endurance	Utility Endurance	Women's Sprint	Men's Sprint	Overall
1st	Franklin W. Olin College of Engineering					Missouri University of Science and Technology	University of Toronto	Grove City College	University of Toronto	Missouri University of Science and Technology	University of Toronto
2nd	University of Wisconsin, Milwaukee	Villanova University	Northern Arizona University	Villanova University	University of Wisconsin, Milwaukee	Rose–Hulman Institute of Technology	Missouri University of Science and Technology	University of Central Florida	Missouri University of Science and Technology	University of Toronto	Missouri University of Science and Technology
3rd	Northern Arizona University	University of Kansas	California State University, Fresno	Daniel Webster College	California State University, Fresno	University of Toronto	Grove City College	Colorado State University	University of Central Florida	California Polytechnic State University, San Luis Obispo	University of Central Florida

==== West ====
Host: Montana State University
Rank	Speed Class					Unrestricted Class					
Rank	Design	Endurance	Women's Sprint	Men's Sprint	Overall	Design	Speed Endurance	Utility Endurance	Women's Sprint	Men's Sprint	Overall
1st	California State University, Northridge	Montana State University				Rose–Hulman Institute of Technology	California State University Chico	Rose–Hulman Institute of Technology		Missouri University of Science and Technology	Rose–Hulman Institute of Technology
2nd	Montana State University	California State University, Northridge				Missouri University of Science and Technology	Iowa State University	California State University, Chico	Missouri University of Science and Technology	Rose–Hulman Institute of Technology	Missouri University of Science and Technology
3rd	San Jose State University					Portland State University	Rose–Hulman Institute of Technology	South Dakota School of Mines & Technology		California State University, Chico	South Dakota School of Mines & Technology

=== 2012 ===
==== East ====
Host: Grove City College
Rank	Design	Innovation	Women's Speed	Men's Speed	Endurance	Overall
1st	Rose–Hulman Institute of Technology	Franklin W. Olin College of Engineering	Rose–Hulman Institute of Technology	Missouri University of Science and Technology		Rose–Hulman Institute of Technology
2nd	University of Toronto	Rose–Hulman Institute of Technology	Missouri University of Science and Technology	Rose–Hulman Institute of Technology	Franklin W. Olin College of Engineering	Missouri University of Science and Technology
3rd	Franklin W. Olin College of Engineering	University of Toronto	Franklin W. Olin College of Engineering	University of Toronto	Rose–Hulman Institute of Technology	Franklin W. Olin College of Engineering

==== West ====
Host: University of Utah
Rank	Design	Innovation	Women's Speed	Men's Speed	Endurance	Overall
1st	California Polytechnic State University, San Luis Obispo	California State University, Chico	Missouri University of Science and Technology			
2nd	California State University, Chico	California State University, Long Beach	California Polytechnic State University, San Luis Obispo		Rose–Hulman Institute of Technology	California Polytechnic State University, San Luis Obispo
3rd	Rose–Hulman Institute of Technology	California Polytechnic State University, San Luis Obispo	California State University, Long Beach		California Polytechnic State University, San Luis Obispo	Rose–Hulman Institute of Technology

=== 2013 ===
==== East ====
Host: Ferris State University
Rank	Design	Innovation	Women's Speed	Men's Speed	Endurance	Overall
1st	Rose–Hulman Institute of Technology				University of Toronto	Rose–Hulman Institute of Technology
2nd	Missouri University of Science and Technology	University of Florida	University of Missouri Kansas City	Missouri University of Science and Technology		
3rd	Franklin W. Olin College of Engineering		University of Toronto		Rose–Hulman Institute of Technology	University of Toronto

==== West ====
Host: San Jose State University
Rank	Design	Innovation	Women's Speed	Men's Speed	Endurance	Overall
1st	Colorado State University	Rose–Hulman Institute of Technology			California State University, Chico	Rose–Hulman Institute of Technology
2nd	California Polytechnic State University, San Luis Obispo	Colorado State University	Missouri University of Science and Technology		University of California, Berkeley	University of Utah
3rd	Rose-Hulman Institute of Technology	University of Utah	Northern Arizona University		Colorado State University	Missouri University of Science and Technology

=== 2014 ===
==== East ====
Host: University of Central Florida
Rank	Design	Innovation	Women's Speed	Men's Speed	Endurance	Overall
1st	Rose–Hulman Institute of Technology	University of Central Florida				
2nd	University of Central Florida	Rose–Hulman Institute of Technology	University of Missouri Kansas City	Missouri University of Science and Technology	Union College	Rose–Hulman Institute of Technology
3rd	Franklin W. Olin College of Engineering	University of Toronto	Franklin W. Olin College of Engineering	University of Toronto	Southern Illinois University Edwardsville	Franklin W. Olin College of Engineering

==== West ====
Host: San Jose State University
Rank	Design	Innovation	Women's Speed	Men's Speed	Endurance	Overall
1st	Rose–Hulman Institute of Technology		Northern Arizona University	University of Nevada, Reno	University of California Berkeley	Rose–Hulman Institute of Technology
2nd	Northern Arizona University		California State University, Fresno	Missouri University of Science and Technology	University of Nevada, Reno	Northern Arizona University
3rd	California Polytechnic State University, San Luis Obispo	Missouri University of Science and Technology		Rose–Hulman Institute of Technology	Northern Arizona University	Missouri University of Science and Technology

=== 2015 ===
==== East ====
Host: University of Florida
Rank	Design	Innovation	Women's Speed	Men's Speed	Endurance	Overall
1st	University of Toronto	Missouri University of Science and Technology				
2nd	Rose–Hulman Institute of Technology		University of Alabama	University of Akron	University of Alabama	
3rd	Missouri University of Science and Technology	City College of New York	University of Central Florida	Rose–Hulman Institute of Technology	Union College	University of Akron

==== West ====
Host: ASME Santa Clara Valley Section
Rank	Design	Innovation	Women's Speed	Men's Speed	Endurance	Overall
1st	California Polytechnic State University, San Luis Obispo	California State University Northridge	Missouri University of Science and Technology	Rose–Hulman Institute of Technology	University of Hawai'i at Mānoa	Rose–Hulman Institute of Technology
2nd	Rose–Hulman Institute of Technology			California Polytechnic State University, San Luis Obispo	LeTourneau University	Missouri University of Science and Technology
3rd	Missouri University of Science and Technology	Franklin W. Olin College of Engineering		University of Hawai'i at Mānoa	University of Southern California	University of Hawai'i at Mānoa

=== 2016 ===
==== East ====
Host: Ohio University
Rank	Design	Innovation	Women's Speed	Men's Speed	Endurance	Overall
1st	Rose–Hulman Institute of Technology	University of Akron		Rose–Hulman Institute of Technology	University of Akron	
2nd	Ohio Northern University		Rose–Hulman Institute of Technology	University of Akron	Missouri University of Science and Technology	Rose–Hulman Institute of Technology
3rd	University of Toronto	Rose–Hulman Institute of Technology	Ohio University	Missouri University of Science and Technology	Ohio University	

==== West ====
Host: ASME Santa Clara Valley Section
Rank	Design	Innovation	Women's Speed	Men's Speed	Endurance	Overall
1st	California State University, Northridge			University of Akron	Utah State University	California State University, Northridge
2nd	Franklin W. Olin College of Engineering	Utah State University	Montana State University	California State University, Northridge	University of Akron	
3rd	Rose–Hulman Institute of Technology	University of California Berkeley	University of Akron	Montana State University	California State University, Northridge	Utah State University

=== 2017 ===
==== East ====
Host: Tennessee Tech
Rank	Design	Innovation	Women's Speed	Men's Speed	Endurance	Overall
1st	Ohio University	Rose–Hulman Institute of Technology	South Dakota State University		South Dakota State University	Rose–Hulman Institute of Technology
2nd	Rose–Hulman Institute of Technology	Missouri University of Science and Technology	Rose–Hulman Institute of Technology	University of Florida	Ohio University	South Dakota State University
3rd	South Dakota State University	University of Wisconsin Madison	Ohio University	Rose–Hulman Institute of Technology	University of Akron	Ohio University

==== West ====
Host: University of Nevada, Las Vegas
Rank	Design	Innovation	Women's Speed	Men's Speed	Endurance	Overall
1st	California State University, Northridge		Utah State University	South Dakota State University	Lakehead University	California State University Northridge
2nd	Universidad Nacional Autónoma de México	University of California Berkeley	California State University Northridge			Utah State University
3rd	Northern Arizona University	South Dakota State University	University of Southern California	Utah State University		South Dakota State University

=== 2018 ===
==== East ====
Host: Pennsylvania State University
Rank	Design	Innovation	Women's Speed	Men's Speed	Endurance	Overall
1st	South Dakota State University	Dehli Technological University	South Dakota State University	University of Akron	University of Pittsburgh	South Dakota State University
2nd	University of Toronto		University of Akron	South Dakota State University	University of Akron	
3rd	Ohio University	University of Akron	Ohio University			

==== West ====
Host: California State Polytechnic University, Pomona
Rank	Design	Innovation	Women's Speed	Men's Speed	Endurance	Overall
1st	Universidad Nacional de Mexico	South Dakota State University		University of Southern California	California State University Northridge	South Dakota State University
2nd	University of California Berkeley	California State University Northridge		South Dakota State University		California State University Northridge
3rd	South Dakota State University	University of Hawai'i Mānoa	University of California Berkeley	California State Polytechnic University, Pomona	University of Southern California	University of California Berkeley

=== 2019 ===
==== North ====
Host: Michigan State University
Rank	Design	Women's Speed	Men's Speed	Endurance	Overall
1st	Ohio University	University of Toronto			Ohio University
2nd	University of Akron	Ohio University	University of Akron	South Dakota State University	University of Toronto
3rd	South Dakota State University		Ohio University		South Dakota State University

==== West ====
Host: California State Polytechnic University, Pomona
Rank	Design	Women's Speed	Men's Speed	Endurance	Overall
1st	University of Akron	South Dakota State University			
2nd	California State University Northridge		Missouri University of Science and Technology	California State University Northridge	
3rd	South Dakota State University	Missouri University of Science and Technology	University of Akron		

=== 2020 ===
==== North ====
Rank	Overall
1st	Missouri University of Science and Technology
2nd	California State University Northridge
3rd	South Dakota State University

==== South ====
Rank	Overall
1st	Missouri University of Science and Technology
2nd	South Dakota State University
3rd	University of San Diego

=== 2021 ===
Rank	Innovation	CDR
1st	University of California, Berkeley	École de Technologie Supérieure
2nd	École de Technologie Supérieure	University of California, Berkeley
3rd	California State Polytechnic University, Pomona	National Institute of Technology Rourkela

=== 2022 ===
Rank	Innovation	CDR
1st	Boise State University	École de Technologie Supérieure
2nd	École de Technologie Supérieure	NIT Rourkela
3rd	*NIT Rourkela / *NIT Jamshedpur	LNM Institute of Information Technology

*Indicates a tie

=== 2023 ===
Host: Liberty University
Rank	Design	Endurance	Overall
1st	South Dakota State University	University of Wisconsin Madison	University of Central Florida
2nd	Missouri University of Science and Technology	University of Central Florida	Missouri University of Science and Technology
3rd	University of Central Florida	Rose–Hulman Institute of Technology	South Dakota State University

=== 2024 ===
==== East ====
Host: Liberty University
Rank	Design	Sprint	Endurance	Overall
1st	École de Technologie Supérieure	Rose–Hulman Institute of Technology	Missouri University of Science and Technology	École de Technologie Supérieure
2nd	Rose–Hulman Institute of Technology	Missouri University of Science and Technology	École de Technologie Supérieure	Rose–Hulman Institute of Technology
3rd	Youngstown State University	Embry-Riddle Aeronautical University	Rose–Hulman Institute of Technology	Missouri University of Science and Technology

==== West ====
Host: Boise State University
Rank	Design	Sprint	Endurance	Overall
1st	University of Southern California	Boise State University		
2nd	California State University, Northridge	California Polytechnic State University San Luis Obispo	University of Southern California	
3rd	California Polytechnic State University San Luis Obispo	California State University, Northridge		

== Overall totals ==
School	First	Second	Third	Total points
Missouri University of Science and Technology	13	11	4	65
Rose–Hulman Institute of Technology	13	4	1	48
Colorado State University	5	4	2	25
South Dakota State University	3	2	5	18
California State University, Northridge	2	4	2	16
École de Technologie Supérieure	3	2	0	13
California Polytechnic State University, San Luis Obispo	2	3	1	13
University of Oklahoma	2	2	0	10
Wright State University	0	3	4	10
Seattle University	2	0	3	9
University of Akron	1	2	2	9
University of Central Florida	2	0	2	8
Franklin W. Olin College of Engineering	1	1	3	8
Montana Tech	1	2	0	7
University of Toronto	1	1	2	7
Boise State University	2	0	0	6
Grove City College	2	0	0	6
University of California, Berkeley	1	1	1	6
Ohio University	1	0	3	6
Iowa State University	1	1	0	5
University of Alabama	1	1	0	5
University of Buffalo	1	1	0	5
Virginia Tech	1	0	2	5
South Dakota School of Mines and Technology	0	2	1	5
University of Nevada, Reno	0	2	1	5
University of Wisconsin, Madison	0	2	1	5
Portland State University	0	1	3	5
California State University, Chico	1	0	1	4
University of Florida	0	2	0	4
National Institute of Technology, Rourkela	0	1	2	4
LeTourneau University	1	0	0	3
Montana State University	1	0	0	3
National Yunlin University of Science and Technology	1	0	0	3
Utah State University	0	1	1	3
Lafayette College	0	1	0	2
Michigan Technological University	0	1	0	2
Northern Arizona University	0	1	0	2
United States Naval Academy	0	1	0	2
University of Missouri, Kansas City	0	1	0	2
University of North Carolina at Charlotte	0	1	0	2
University of Southern California	0	1	0	2
University of Utah	0	1	0	2
University of Wisconsin, Milwaukee	0	1	0	2
California State University Fresno	0	0	2	2
California State University, Long Beach	0	0	2	2
California Polytechnic State University, Pomona	0	0	1	1
Central Washington University	0	0	1	1
Clarkson University	0	0	1	1
Fairfield University	0	0	1	1
Ferris State University	0	0	1	1
Marquette University	0	0	1	1
Milwaukee School of Engineering	0	0	1	1
National Institute of Technology, Jamshedpur	0	0	1	1
Ohio Northern University	0	0	1	1
Polytechnic University of Puerto Rico	0	0	1	1
San Jose State University	0	0	1	1
LNM Institute of Information Technology	0	0	1	1
University of Hawai'i at Mānoa	0	0	1	1
University of San Diego	0	0	1	1
