= SICP (disambiguation) =

SICP may refer to:

- Silvergate Bank, where SICP was the former stock ticker symbol
- Structure and Interpretation of Computer Programs, an introductory computer programming book
- St. Ignatius College Preparatory, Jesuit high school in San Francisco, California, U.S.
- St. Ignatius College Preparatory School, Jesuit high school in Chicago, Illinois, U.S.
- SICP, the Jaipur Metro station code for Sindhi Camp metro station, Jaipur, Rajasthan, India
