= Chaugan Stadium =

Stadium in Jaipur, Rajasthan, India

Coordinates: 26.9305629°N 75.8206665°E

Chaugan Stadium is a stadium in Jaipur city in Rajasthan state in India. Elephant polo matches are played here. The stadium is a venue of Teej festivities and Elephant Festival. The stadium lies between Gangauri Bazaar and the City Palace not far away from Govind Dev Ji Temple.
