= The Raj Palace =

General information
- Location: Jaipur, Rajasthan, India
- Coordinates: 26.935289°N 75.833858°E

The Raj Palace in Jaipur Rajasthan, India is more than two and a half centuries old palace converted into a grand heritage hotel.

The hotel is awarded as "the best heritage hotel of India" by the Government of India and voted as "The leading heritage hotel of the world" consecutively for seven times by World Travel Awards. The property is a member of "Small Luxury Hotel" of the World (SLH). It is managed by the flagship company GKV group which is also a major player in Mining and Information Technology industries.

== History ==
In 1503 AD, Maharaja Prithviraj Singh I was the ruler of Amber, capital before Jaipur was built. One of his descendants in 1568 AD Thakur Manohardas Ji, the then Prime Minister of Amber was one of the greatest warriors in the Rajput history, ruling over the territories of Chaumoo, Samode and Mohanna. Thakur Sahib along with Maharaja Man Singh Ji of Jaipur gained victories in overall 22 battles including the battle of Kandhar in Afghanistan where he defeated the army bravely and snatched their flags to present to the King, in return the Thakur Sahib got the original flag of Amber and a great fortune of wealth.

One of his descendants Thakur Mohan Singh Ji, ruler of Chaumoo and the then Prime Minister of Raj built the first Palace of Jaipur in 1727 which is Today known as "The Raj Palace". The Palace is still being inhabited by his 16th generation descendant and current owner Princess Jayendra Kumari.

== Now ==
Under the supervision of Princess Jayendra Kumari, a team of 800 workers began renovating the palace's arched corridors, residential quarters and courtyards in 1995. The renovation preserved the palace's historic magnificence while introducing modern day amenities. After around 110000 sq ft covered area restoration, 7 million Man hours, 50000 sq ft of Stucco Restoration, 50000 sq ft of hand painting and 8000 sq ft of Gold foiling, the palace opened as a grand heritage hotel on 10 August 1997. "Museum Suites" were also created i.e. every suite having a private museum, making the hotel the first palace hotel with such accommodations in the world. The renovated palace's facilities are also easily accessible to special needs and handicapped guests.

The hotel became a member of "Small Luxury Hotels of the World", "Five Star Alliance" and "VISA Luxury Collection".

The present General Manager of the hotel is Mrs. Ankur Rara Jethlia.

== Awards and recognition ==
- 2007 World's Leading Heritage Hotel
- 2008 Asia's Leading Hotel Suite
- 2008 World's Leading Heritage Hotel
- 2009 Asia's Leading Hotel Suite
- 2009 World's Leading Heritage Hotel
- 2010 Asia's Leading Hotel Suite
- 2010 World's Leading Heritage Hotel
- 2011 Asia's Leading Hotel Suite
- 2011 World's Leading Heritage Hotel
- 2012 Asia's Leading Hotel Suite
- 2012 World's Leading Heritage Hotel
- 2013 Asia's Leading Hotel Suite
- 2013 World's Leading Heritage Hotel
- 2014 Asia's Leading Hotel Suite
- Rashtriya Rattan Award 1999
- International Gold Star Millennium Award 2002 in Bangkok
- The Golden Award for Quality & Business Prestige-New Millennium Award-Total Quality Satisfaction of Customer, nominated by American travel agents Association in Geneva Switzerland 2005
- 32nd International award for Hotel Catering and Tourism, 2006 in Madrid Spain
- 2006 National Tourism award for the best heritage hotel (For earning 2006 National Tourism award for the best heritage hotel (For earning the highest foreign Exchange)
- CNN calls hotel's Presidential suite "Asia's best suite and world's first in-suite museum"
- CNN calls The Raj Palace "most luxurious destination in the world"
- Member of "Small Luxury Hotels Of The World" (SLH)
- Member of Five Star Alliance
- Member of VISA Luxury Collection
