= Sindhi Camp metro station =

Jaipur Metro's Pink Line metro station

AbhiBus Sindhi Camp
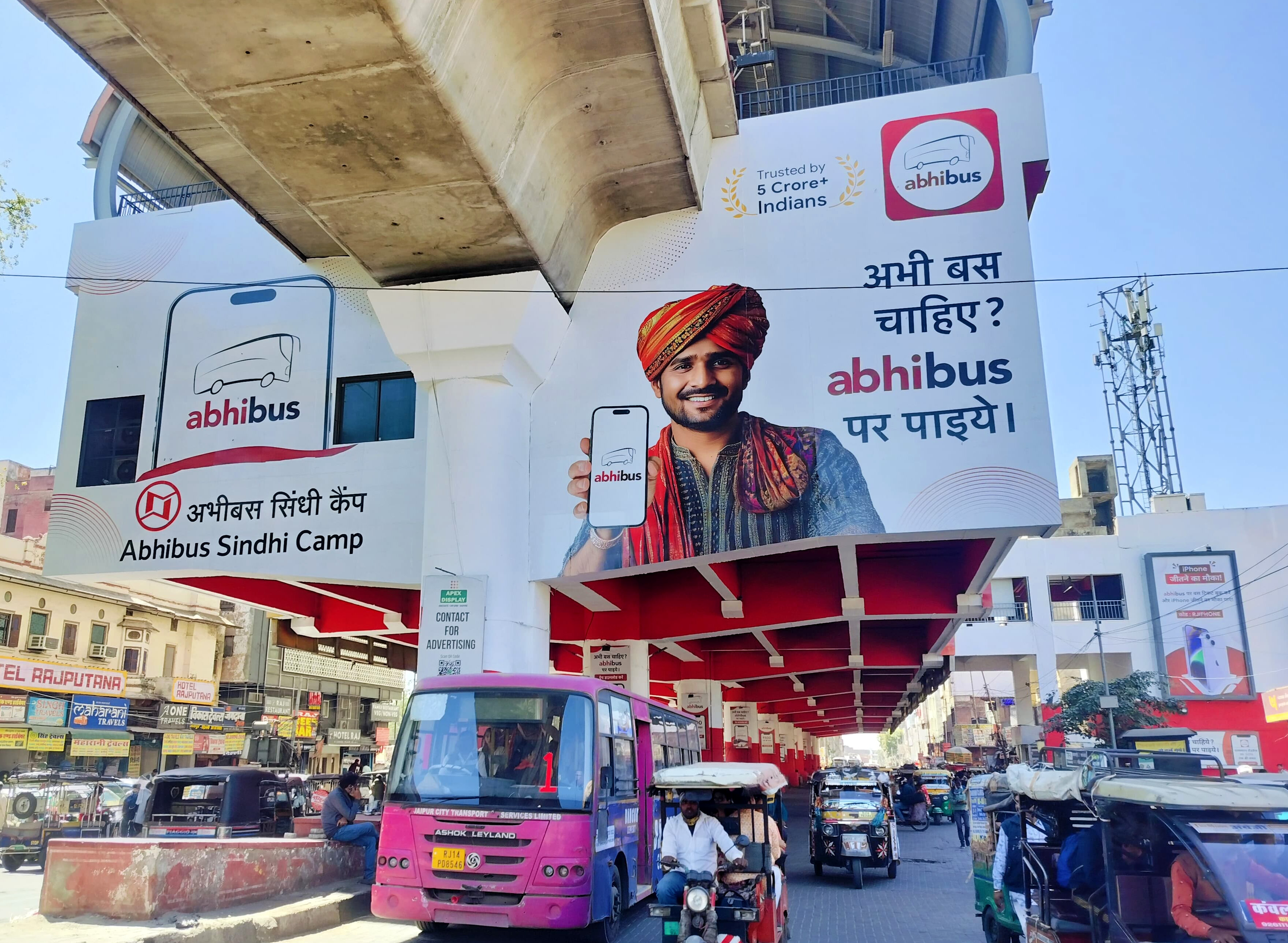

General information
- Location: Station Rd, Sindhi Camp, Jaipur, Rajasthan 302001
- Coordinates: 26°55′21″N 75°47′59″E
- System: Jaipur Metro station
- Owner: Jaipur Metro
- Operator: Jaipur Metro Rail Corporation (JMRC)
- Line: Pink Line
- Platforms: Side platform Platform-1 → Badi Chaupar; Platform-2 → Mansarovar
- Tracks: 2

Construction
- Structure type: Elevated, Double track
- Platform levels: 2
- Accessible: Yes

Other information
- Station code: SICP

History
- Opened: June 3, 2015; 11 years ago
- Electrified: 25 kV 50 Hz AC through overhead catenary

Services
Preceding station	Jaipur Metro	Following station
Railway Station towards Mansarovar	Pink Line	Chandpole towards Badi Chaupar
Route map
Location

Sindhi Camp, also known as AbhiBus Sindhi Camp, is an elevated metro station on the East-West Corridor of the Pink Line of Jaipur Metro in Jaipur, India. This station was opened on 3 June 2015, which connects to the Sindhi Camp, an inter state bus terminal as well as projected Orange Line of Jaipur Metro.

In 1947 at the India-Pakistan partition, this was the first place in Jaipur where Sindhi came from Pakistan and they camp here to stay here. That is why its name is Sindhi Camp.

== Station layout ==
G	Street Level	Exit/Entrance
L1	Mezzanine	Fare control, station agent, Metro Card vending machines, crossover
L2	Side platform | Doors will open on the left
L2	Platform 1 Eastbound	Towards → Badi Chaupar; Next Station: Chandpole
L2	Platform 2 Westbound	Towards ← Mansarovar; Next Station: Railway Station
L2	Side platform | Doors will open on the left
L2

== See also ==
- Jaipur Metro
- Blue
- List of Jaipur Metro stations
- Jaipur BRTS
- List of rapid transit systems in India
- List of Metro Systems
- Rajasthan State Road Transport Corporation
