= Chandpole metro station =

Jaipur Metro's Pink Line metro station

Chandpole
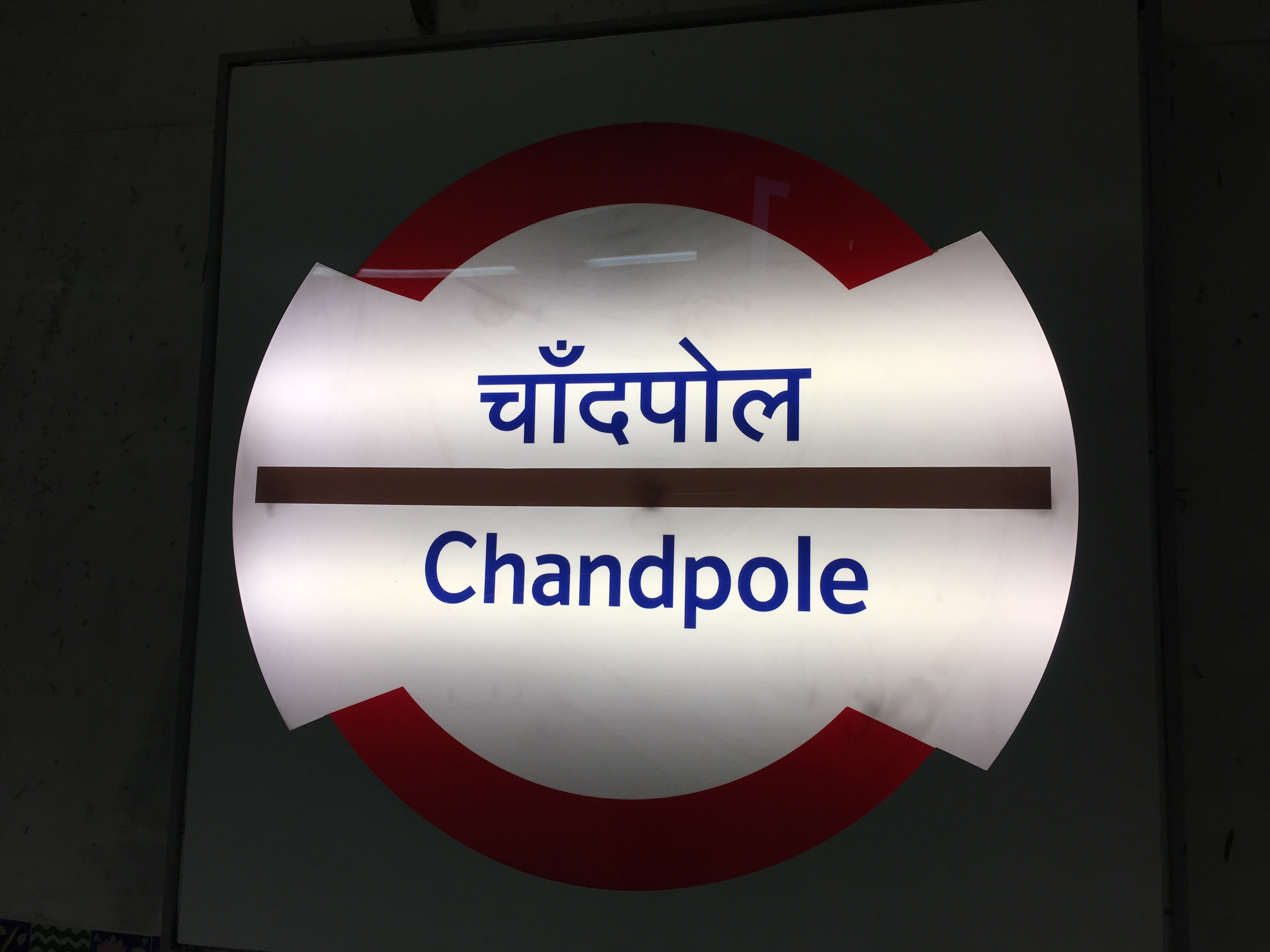

General information
- Location: Chandpole, Jaipur
- Coordinates: 26°55′35″N 75°48′27″E
- System: Jaipur Metro station
- Owner: Jaipur Metro
- Operator: Jaipur Metro Rail Corporation (JMRC)
- Line: Pink Line
- Platforms: Side platform Platform-1 → Badi Chaupar; Platform-2 → Mansarovar
- Tracks: 2

Construction
- Structure type: Underground, Double track
- Platform levels: 2
- Accessible: Yes

Other information
- Station code: CDPE

History
- Opened: June 3, 2015; 11 years ago
- Electrified: 25 kV 50 Hz AC through overhead catenary

Services
Preceding station	Jaipur Metro	Following station
Sindhi Camp towards Mansarovar	Pink Line	Chhoti Chaupar towards Badi Chaupar
Route map
Location

Chandpole is an underground metro station on the East-West Corridor of the Pink Line of Jaipur Metro in Jaipur, India. This station was opened on 3 June 2015, which serves the Chandpole colony.

== Station layout ==
G	Street Level	Exit/Entrance
L1	Mezzanine	Fare control, station agent, Metro Card vending machines, crossover
L2	Side platform | Doors will open on the left
L2	Platform 1 Eastbound	Towards → Badi Chaupar; Next Station: Chhoti Chaupar
L2	Platform 2 Westbound	Towards ← Mansarovar; Next Station: Utkarsh Sindhi Camp
L2	Side platform | Doors will open on the left
L2

== See also ==
- Jaipur Metro
- Blue
- List of Jaipur Metro stations
- Jaipur BRTS
- List of rapid transit systems in India
- List of Metro Systems
- Rajasthan State Road Transport Corporation
