= Elephant Festival =

Festivals in Rajasthan

The Elephant Festival is a festival celebrated in the city of Jaipur in Rajasthan state in India. The Elephant Festival begins with a procession of bedecked elephants, camels, horses and folk dancers. The owners embellish their elephants with vibrant colours, jhool (saddle cloth) and heavy jewelry. Female elephants wear anklets that tinkle as they walk. People perched on top of elephants sprinkle gulaal (coloured powder). The most beautifully decorated elephant is awarded as the winner. Elephant polo, elephant racing, and a game of tug-of-war between elephants and 19 people are the featured events of the festival. The elephants are also outfitted with ear danglers and brocade scarves to embellish their ears and necks. The Mahouts, who are known as the caretakers of the elephants, decorate the foreheads of the animals with head-plates as well as garnish their tusks with gold, silver bracelets and rings. Other events that take place during the festival include a polo match and a tug of war contest, where the strongest elephant is chosen to compete against a group of ten people.

Although the festival is primarily based on elephants, other animals such as camels and horses also participate.

== History ==
The Elephant Festival is considered one of the most popular and celebrated events in the city of Jaipur. Since the festival was introduced, the ceremony has managed to attract a variety of outsiders to the festive event. Elephants symbolize royalty according to the traditions of Rajasthan. The elephant is also believed to be associated with Buddhism and Jainism. In fact, the elephant itself has a historical significance in Indian traditions. According to Indian mythology, gods and the demons stirred the ocean, in the hopes that they would become eternal. Suddenly, nine jewels also known as the navratnas surfaced from the ocean. Of the nine jewels that reappeared, one of them was an elephant. Since then, the elephant has been regarded as a precious animal.

The state of Rajasthan was a popular destination for many royal figures as the kings and princes of those times would take elephant rides to the Amber Palace of Rajasthan. During the monarchy, India’s royalty would hold events where the strongest elephants would fight each other to entertain the royal guests. Nowadays, the festival is organized every year by the Rajasthan tourism group in the Chaugan Stadium. The venue was relocated to the Jaipur Polo Group grounds due to the festival’s increasing popularity. The elephants are sacred and are believed to have good luck.

== Controversy ==
For the first time in many years, the Elephant Festival was cancelled for two consecutive years, 2012 and 2014, due to protest from the Animal Welfare Board. The animal activists were concerned about the chemical-laced colour being poured on the elephants and feared that the elephants would be harmed in the process. The Rajasthan tourism group, which hosts the festival every year failed to sign up the elephants with the Animal Welfare Board and provide appropriate documents. As a result of this, the organizers decided to rename the event the Holi Festival. The Tourism Department’s decision to cancel came in the wake of protests by People for the Ethical Treatment of Animals (PETA).
