= Golden Triangle (India) =

Tourist circuit in India

Golden triangle

India's golden triangle is a tourist circuit in India that connects the national capital, New Delhi, with Agra and Jaipur. Tourists' trips usually start in Delhi and move south to the site of the Taj Mahal at Agra (in Uttar Pradesh state), then west, to Jaipur (in the desert landscapes of Rajasthan state). The trip can be undertaken by road, train or plane. The Golden Triangle is now a well-traveled route, providing a good spectrum of the country's different landscapes. The circuit is about 720 km by road. Each leg is about 4 to 6 hours of driving. The Shatabdi Express, Vande Bharat Express, and Gatimaan Express trains also connect New Delhi with Agra and Jaipur. Also these places are of historic importance and have ruled the major parts of India, now the monuments & geographic locations around these places are combination of various cultural mix which make it even better over other places.

== Gallery ==
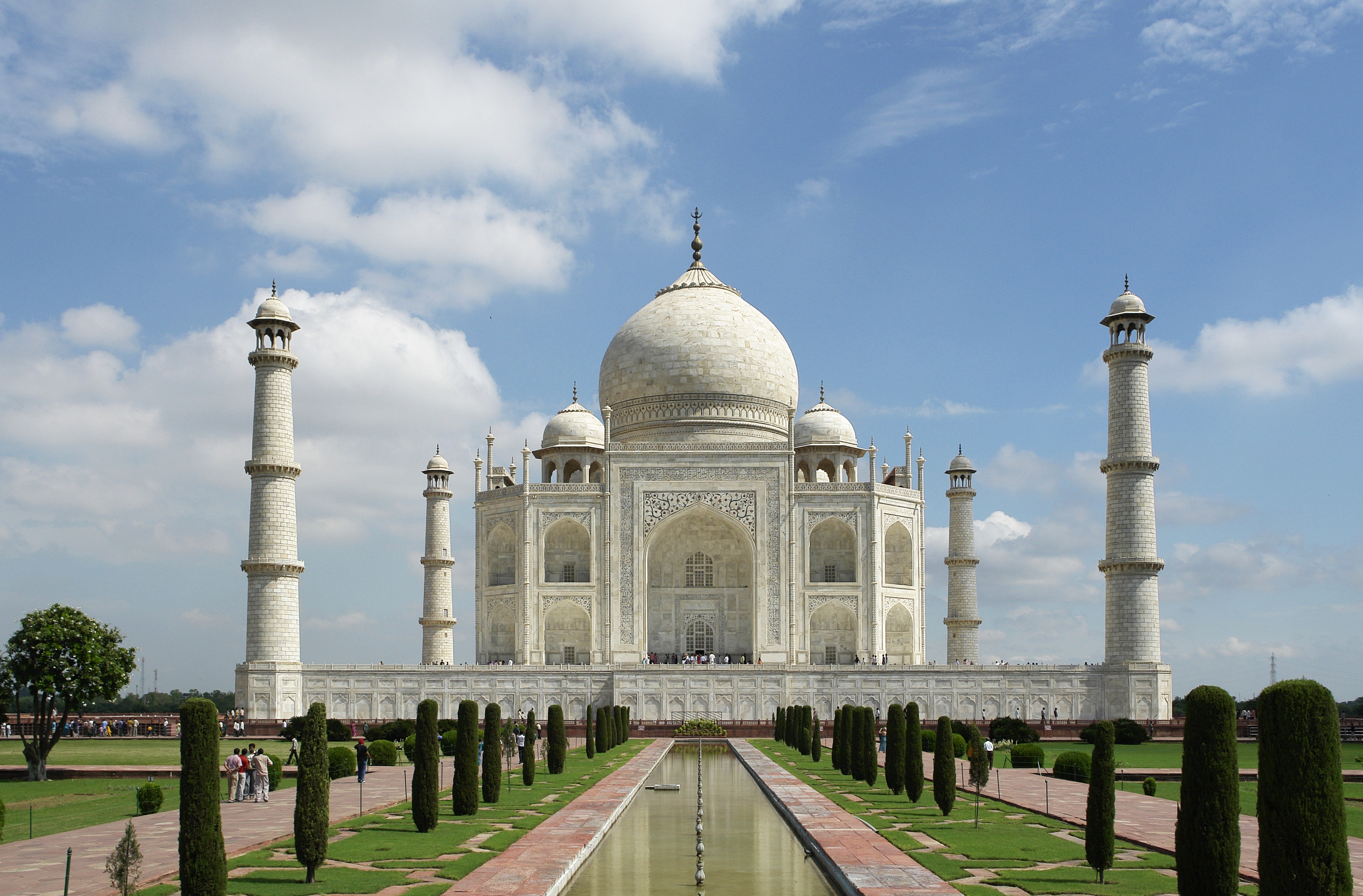
Taj Mahal in Agra

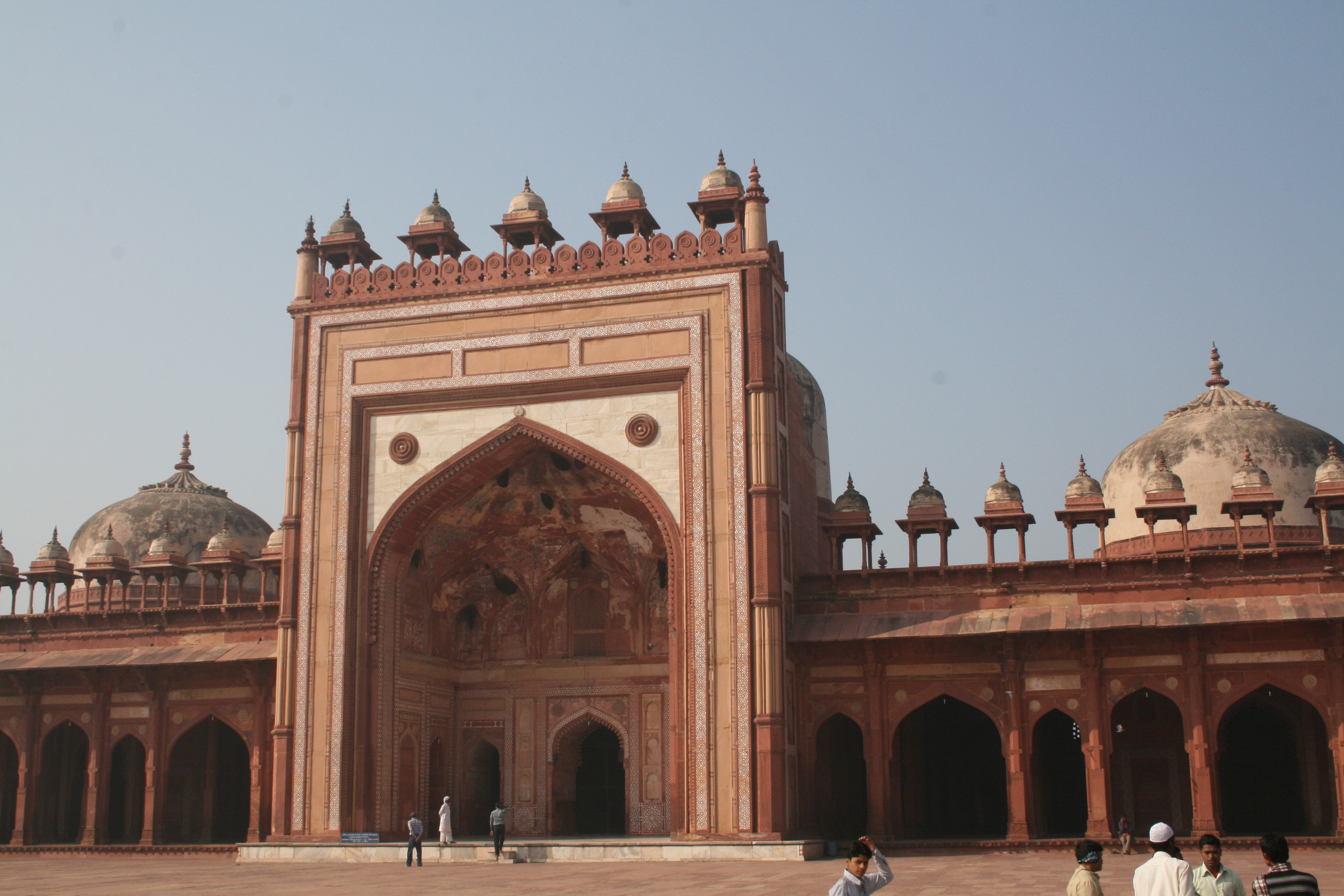
Jama Mosque in Fatehpur Sikri (near Agra)

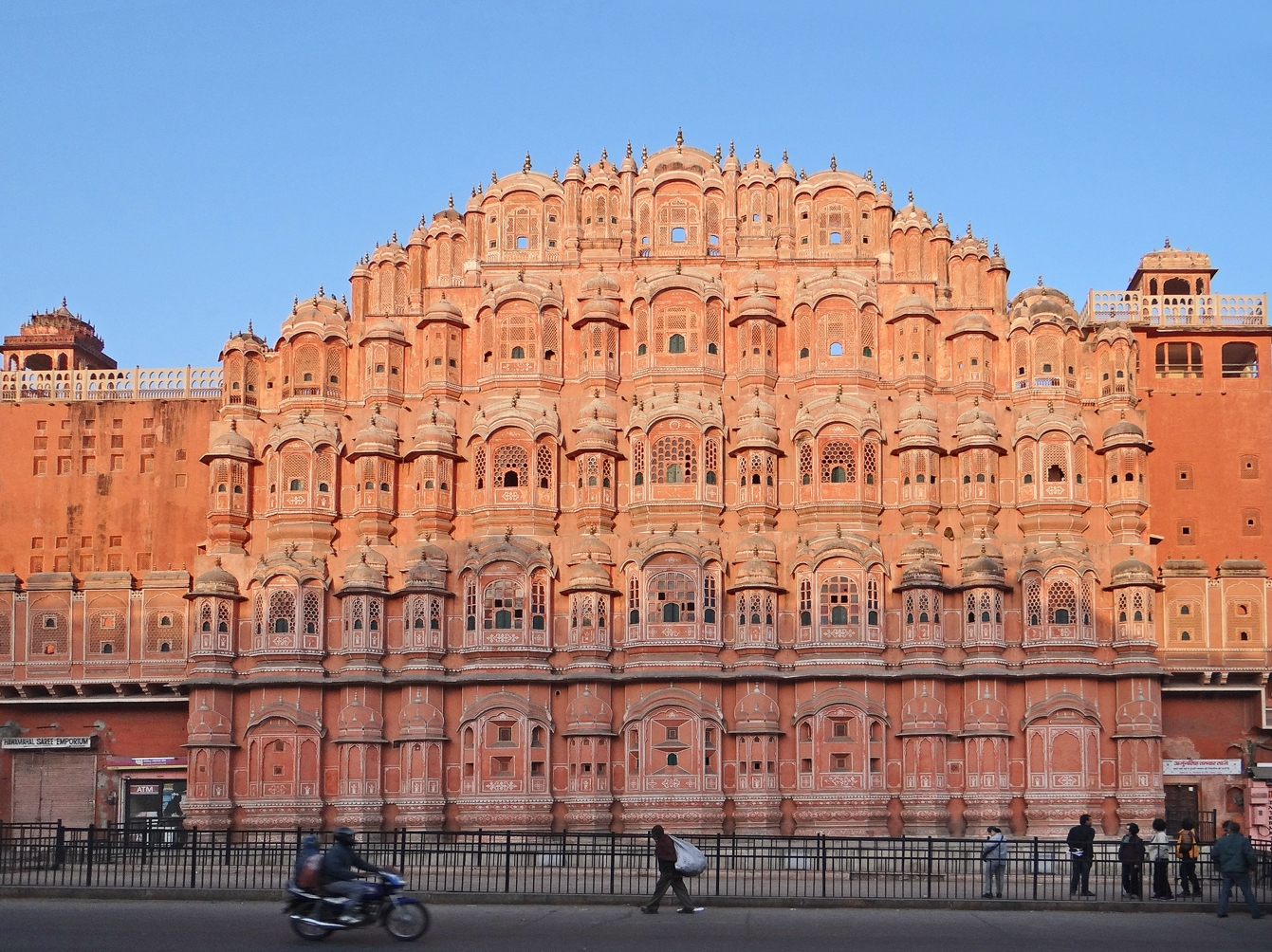
Hawa Mahal in Jaipur
