= Subodh College =

S.S. Jain Subod P.G (Autonomous) College, Jaipur
- Type: Public
- Established: 1954
- Affiliations: University of Rajasthan
- Principal: K. B. Sharma
- Location: Jaipur, Rajasthan, India
- Campus: Urban
- Website: subodhpgcollege.com

Subodh College (or S. S. Jain Subodh P. G. College) is one of the oldest colleges in Jaipur, Rajasthan which was established in 1954 managed under Shri Shwetamber Sthanakwasi Jain Society providing undergraduate courses, postgraduate courses, and professional courses. The college is ranked 81st among colleges in India by the National Institutional Ranking Framework (NIRF) in 2024.

== About ==
S.S. Jain Subodh PG (Autonomous) College, Jaipur was established under the auspices of S.S. Jain Subodh Shiksha Samiti in 1954 with an aim to provide value based higher education and contribute towards holistic development of the society. The Shiksha Samiti itself was established in 1918.

== Location ==
It is located at Ram Bagh Circle, Jaipur, Rajasthan, India – 302 004.

== History ==
S.S. Jain Subodh PG (Autonomous) College, Jaipur was established under the auspices of S.S. Jain Subodh Shiksha Samiti in 1954. The Shiksha Samiti itself was established in 1918.

== Facilities ==
College has Five constructed floors with more than 200 classrooms, 46 laboratories,3 research labs, 5 conference / seminar halls, Staff rooms, One open-air theatre, Two botanical gardens, Five smart classrooms, Library and Book Bank, Open playground and indoor stadium, Two well equipped gymnasiums, Huge underground parking for staff and students, one girls' hostel with occupancy of 225 girls.
