= Syed Akbar Jaipuri =

Kashmiri Urdu poet (1928-1998)

Syed Muhammad Akbar Jaipuri Al-Hussaini
- Born: 23 October 1928; Jaipur, Rajasthan
- Died: 4 March 1998 (aged 69)
- Resting place: Hassanabad

Syed Muhammad Akbar Jaipuri Al-Hussaini (23 October 1928 – 4 March 1998) was a Kashmiri Urdu poet and visionary. He was also known as Mujahid-e-Urdu and Mir Taqi Mir Sani.

== Pen name ==
His original Takhallus (pen-name) was "Akbar", drawn from his given name, Muhammad Akbar.

== Life and education ==
Syed Mohammad Akbar Jaipuri was born on 23 October 1928 in Jaipur to Syed Ali Al-Hussaini, a Muslim religious scholar who belonged to Al-Hussaini Al-Hamadani family of Kashmir, which descended from saint and mystic, Mir Sayyed Ali Hamadani. In 1943, amidst rising communal tension in India, Syed Ali Al-Hussaini was murdered which forced his family to return to their native place Kashmir.

== Death ==
Syed Akbar Jaipuri died on 4 March 1998. He was buried at his ancestral graveyard within the premises of Imam Bargah Hassanabad Srinagar.
