= Jaipur Stock Exchange =

Defunct Indian securities market

Jaipur Stock Exchange (JSE) was located in Jaipur Rajasthan. JSE closed operations and was issued closure by SEBI in March 2015.

JSE was founded and recognized in 1989. JSE was at one time third largest exchange in India in terms of membership. Dr. J N Dhankhar started as executive director of JSE. Within seven years of its incorporation, i.e. by January 1996, JSE managed to list 750 companies and volume of daily turnover rose to average of ₹ 80 million.

JSE was one of the 15 regional stock exchanges which promoted Inter-connected Stock Exchange of India Ltd. by paying the Initial Capital of ₹ 1 crore (₹ 5 lakhs as admission fee and ₹ 95 lakhs as infrastructure fee).

== See also ==
- List of South Asian stock exchanges
- List of stock exchanges in the Commonwealth of Nations
