= LNM Institute of Information Technology =

Deemed university in Jaipur, India

Coordinates: 26.9363°N 75.9235°E

The LNM Institute of Information Technology
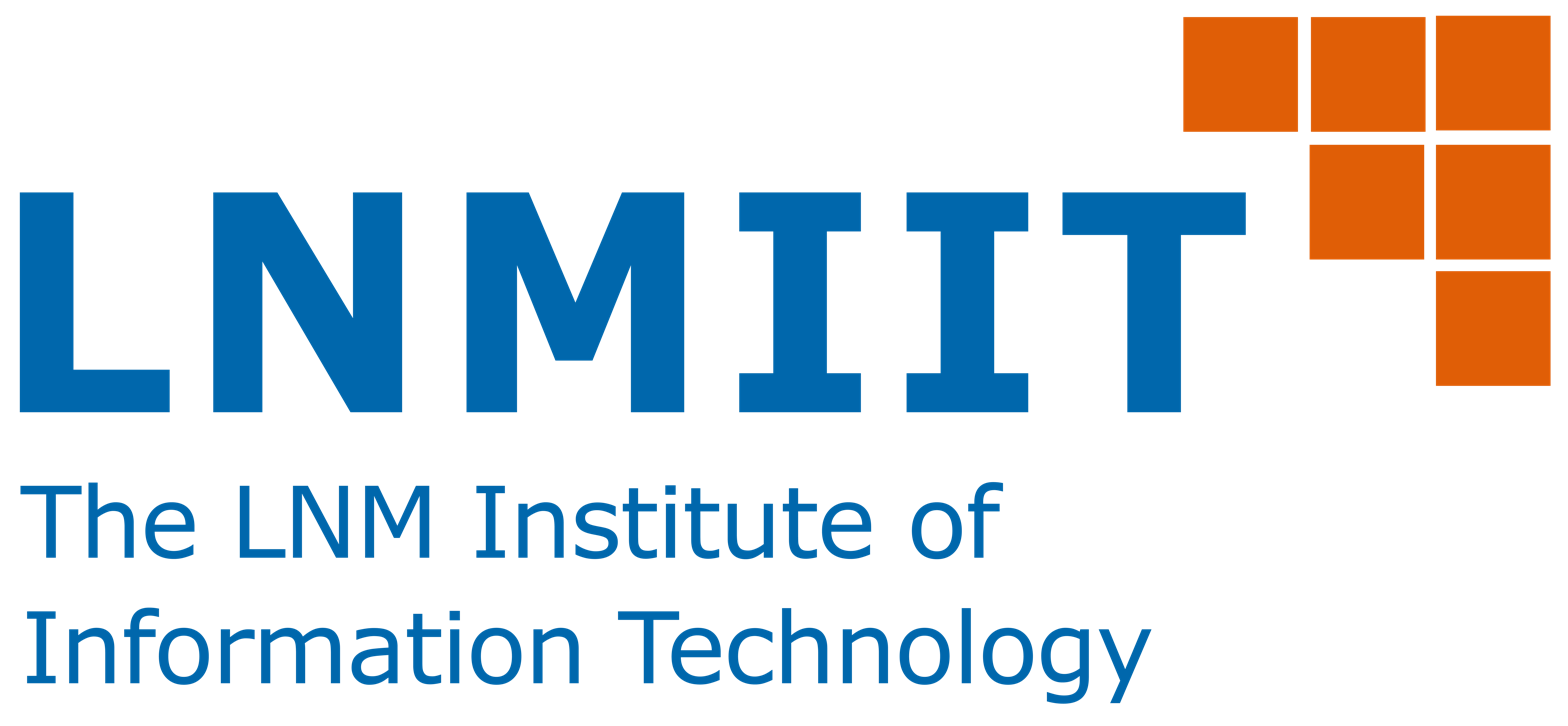
- Motto: "Excellence our motto, Discipline our way"
- Type: Non-profit; Deemed University
- Established: 2002 (24 years ago)
- Founder: Lakshmi Niwas Mittal
- Affiliations: UGC, AICTE, NAAC
- Chairman: Lakshmi Niwas Mittal
- Director: Rahul Banerjee
- Location: Jaipur, Rajasthan, India
- Campus: 100 acres (40 ha)
- Colors: Medium Persian Blue & Spanish Orange
- Website: lnmiit.ac.in

The LNM Institute of Information Technology (LNMIIT) is a research deemed university, located in Jaipur, India.

The institute was founded in 2002 by the LUM Foundation, a philanthropic organization established by steel magnate Lakshmi Niwas Mittal. The institute operates as a non-profit organization under a public-private partnership between the Government of Rajasthan and the Lakshmi Niwas & Usha Mittal Foundation. In 2006, it was declared a deemed university under the De-Novo category of the UGC Act. The Institute belongs to the family of International Institute of Information Technology which are state sponsored N-PPP (Not for Profit Public Private Partnership) research universities similar to the organizational structure of International Institute of Information Technology, Hyderabad and International Institute of Information Technology Bangalore.

== Campus ==
The LNMIIT campus is located at the outskirts of Jaipur, Rajasthan. It is spread across a 100-acre site and includes academic buildings, student hostels, faculty housing, and recreational facilities.

== History ==
LNMIIT (also commonly referred to as IIIT- Jaipur in Rajasthan) was founded in 2002 under the Public–private partnership deemed university model between the Ministry of Human Resource Development of the Govt of Rajasthan and Lakshmi Niwas & Usha Mittal Foundation with the state govt providing the land and the grant for buildings. The structure of formation of LNMIIT is same as an International Institute of Information Technology like IIIT, Hyderabad and IIIT, Bangalore which is of a research university formed by a partnership between the state govt and Industry partner. As special Officers of LNMIIT, the chief secretary of the Govt of Rajasthan Anil Vaish and Principal Secretary of Govt of Rajasthan Ram Lubhaya represented the govt in the partnership. The Governing body of LNMIIT was headed by Narayanan Vaghul, Chairman of ICICI Bank and Lakshmi Mittal. Vishwanathan Sinha, former Deputy director of IIT Kanpur served as its founding director.

== Organisation and Administration ==
LNMIIT is governed by a council that includes representatives from the Government of Rajasthan and the Lakshmi & Usha Mittal Foundation, reflecting its public-private partnership structure. The academic and administrative head of the institute is the Director and the current Director is Professor Rahul Banerjee.

== Academics ==
LNMIIT offers undergraduate, postgraduate, and doctoral programs primarily in engineering and the sciences. The primary undergraduate degree offered is the Bachelor of Technology (B.Tech.). Postgraduate offerings include Master of Technology (M.Tech.), Master of Science (M.S. by Research), and a five-year integrated M.Tech. program. The institute also provides Ph.D. programs across its various departments.

The main academic departments are:

- Computer Science Engineering (CSE)
- Communication and Computer Engineering (CCE)
- Electronics and Communication Engineering (ECE)
- Mechanical and Mechatronics Engineering (MME)
- Mechanical Engineering (ME)
- Artificial Intelligence (AI)
- Artificial Intelligence and Data Science (AIDS)

== Rankings ==
Programming

Students at LNMIIT regularly participate in national and international programming competitions and open-source programs, including Google Summer of Code and the International Collegiate Programming Contest (ICPC). Student teams have also placed in hackathons such as Mumbai Hacks, the Google Cloud Rapid Agent Hackathon, and the Google Agentic AI Hackathon, where LNMIIT teams took the top three spots in 2025.

National Rankings

LNMIIT has been recognized by several national ranking agencies. Here is a summary of recent rankings:

Indian Institutional Ranking Framework (IIRF)

- 11th among Top Private Engineering Colleges in India (2025).

The Week

- 33rd among Top Technical Universities in India (2022).
- 26th among Private Engineering Colleges in India (2022).
- 5th among Private Engineering Colleges in the North Zone (2022).

India Today

- 26th among Top Private Engineering Colleges in India (2022).
- 51st overall in India (2023).
