= Jaipur =

Capital of Rajasthan, India

- Metropolis
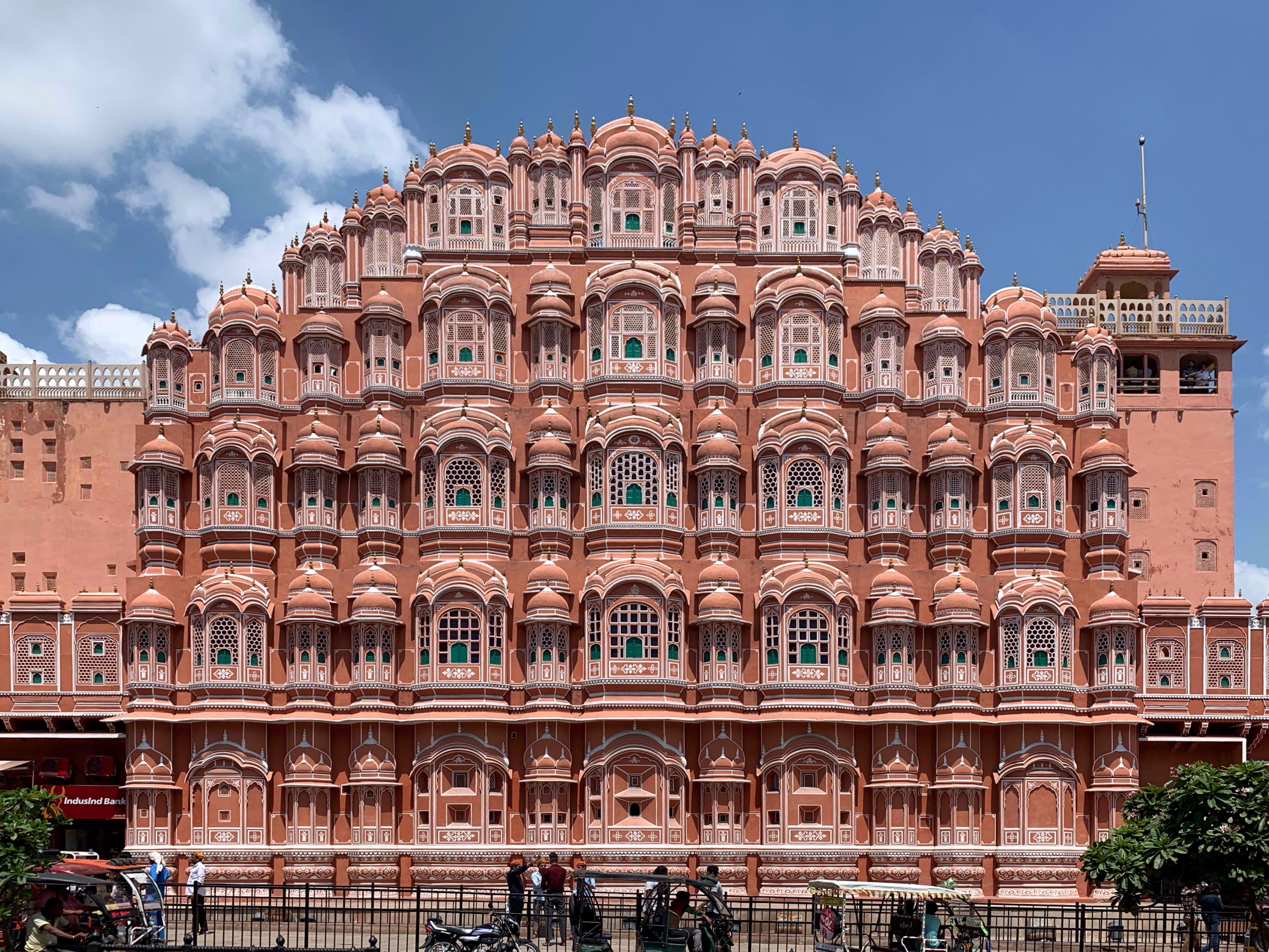
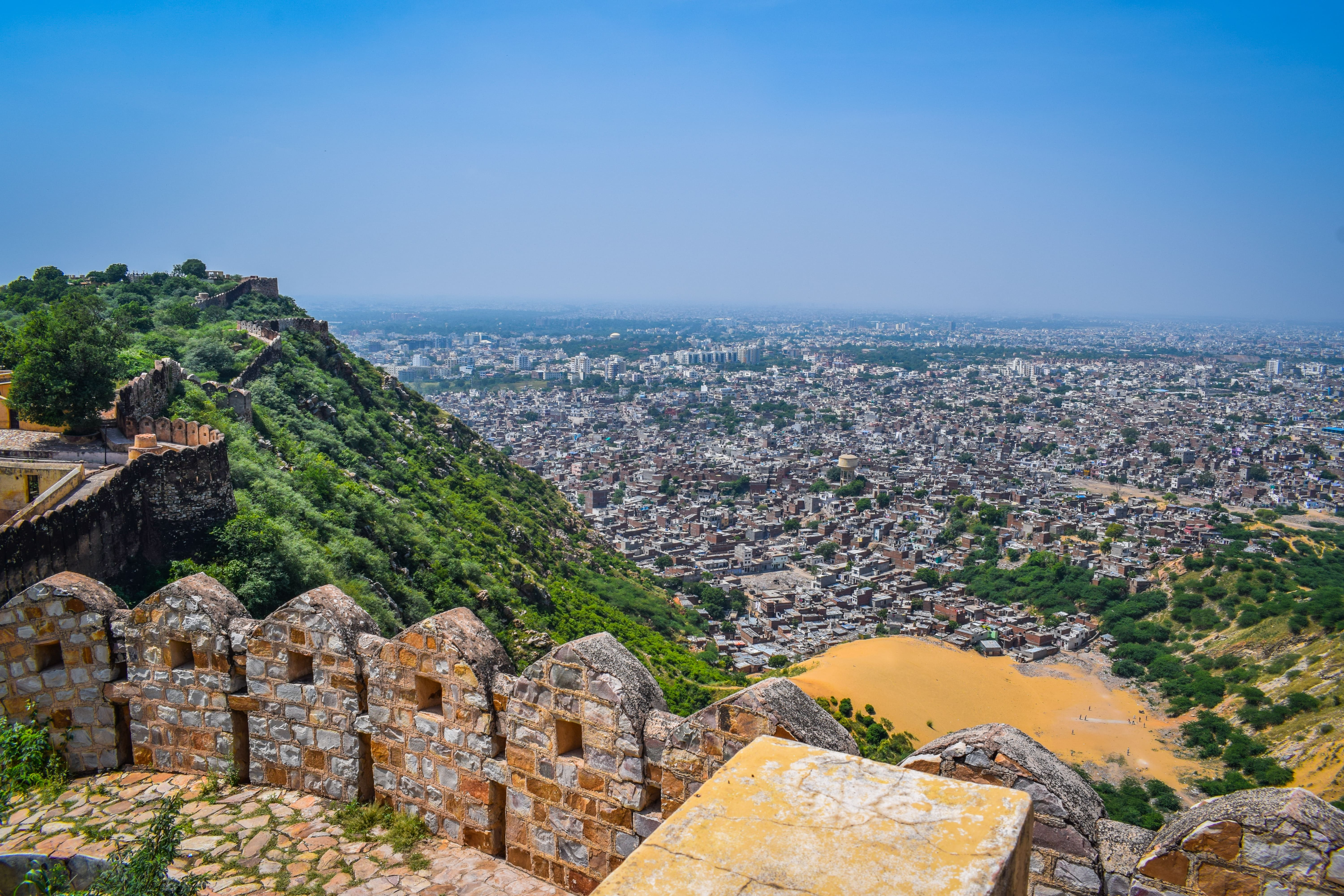
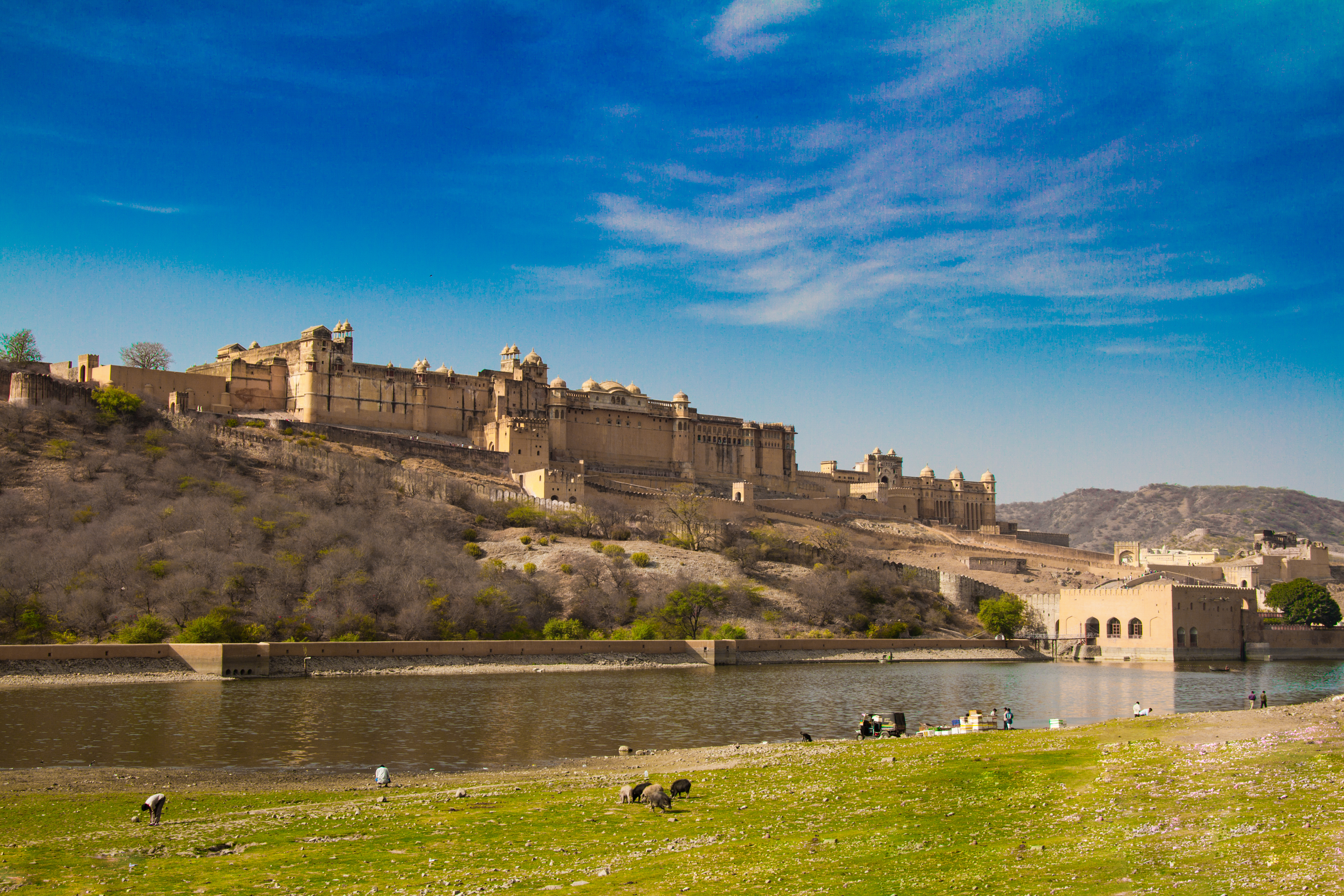
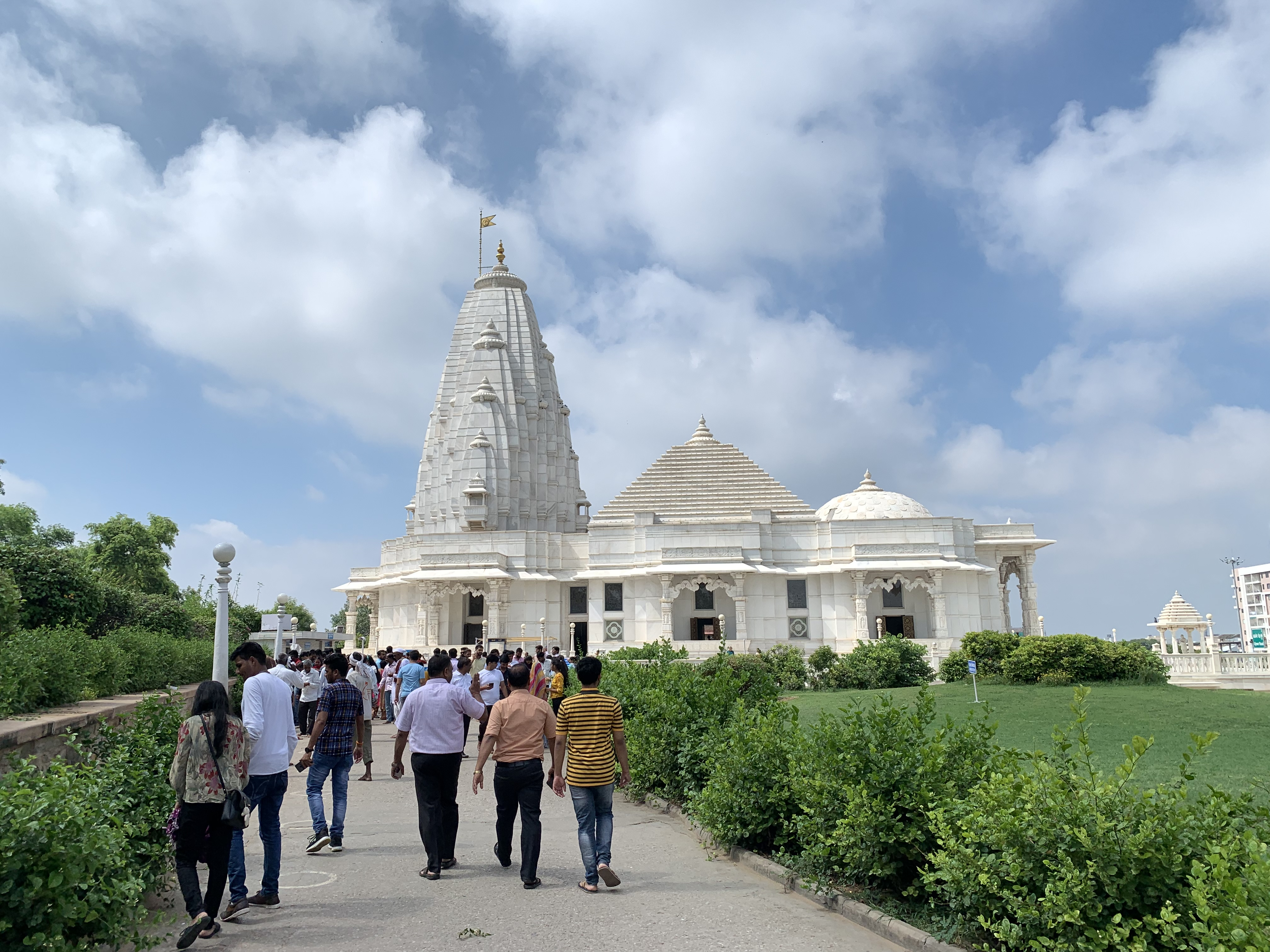
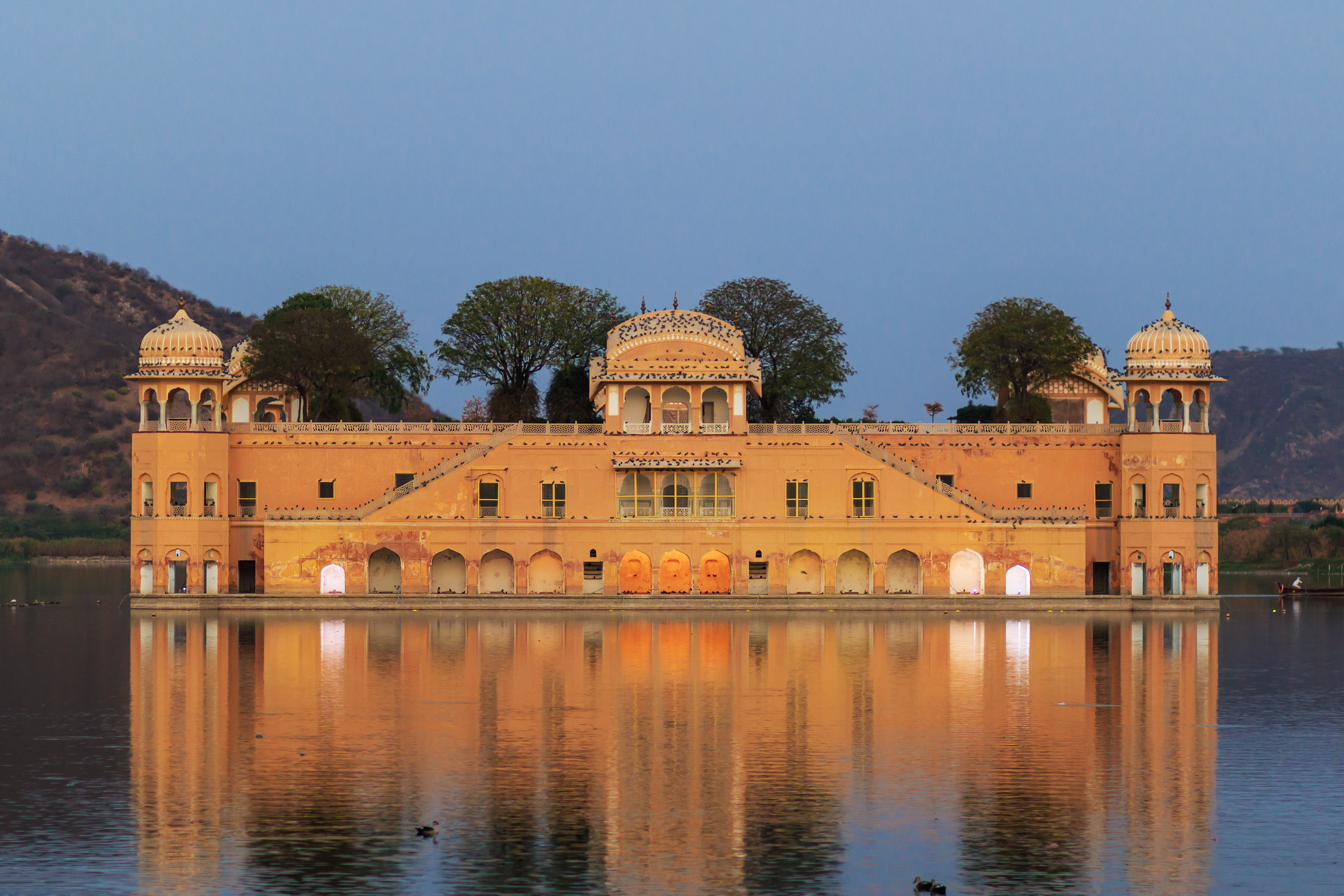
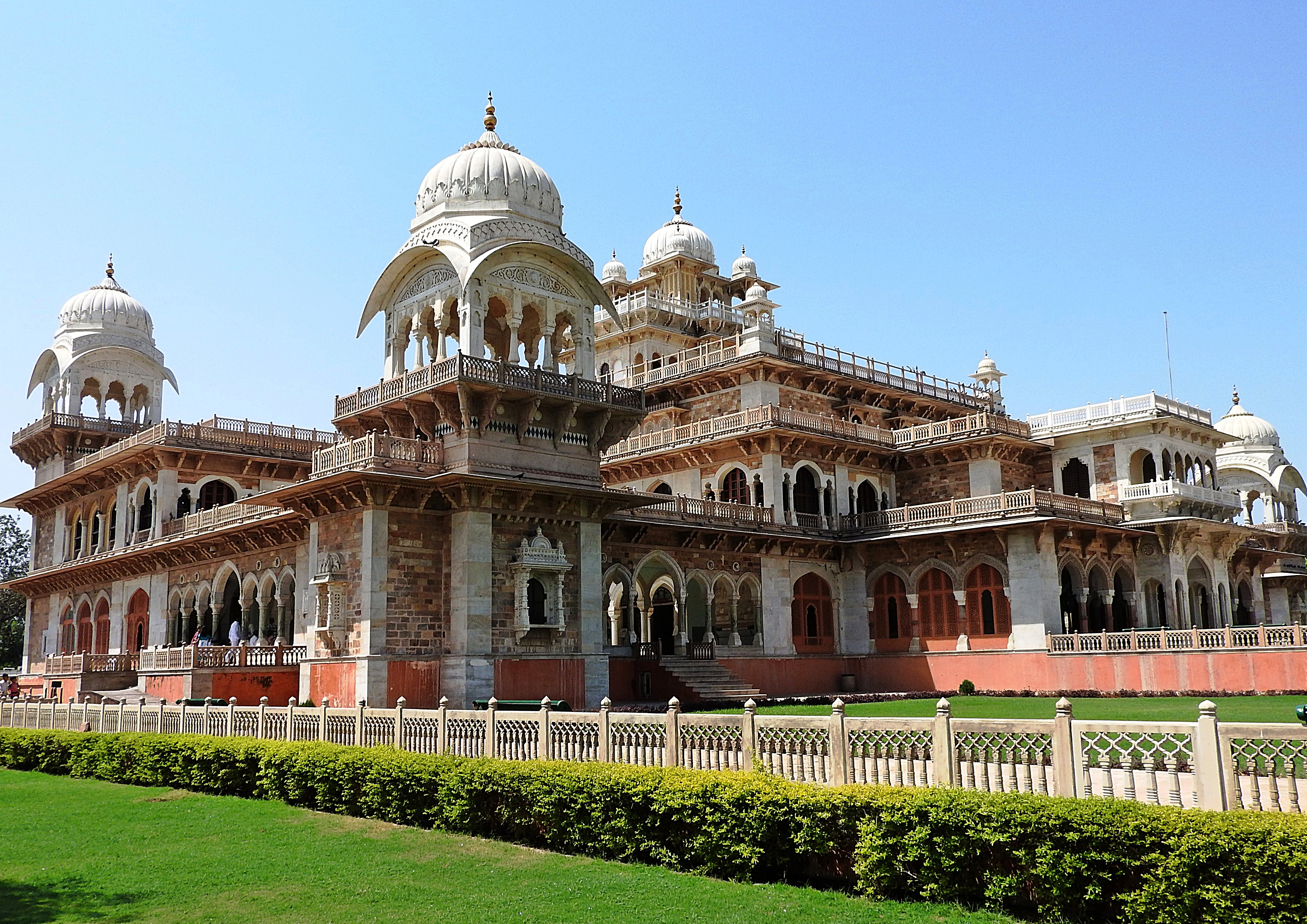
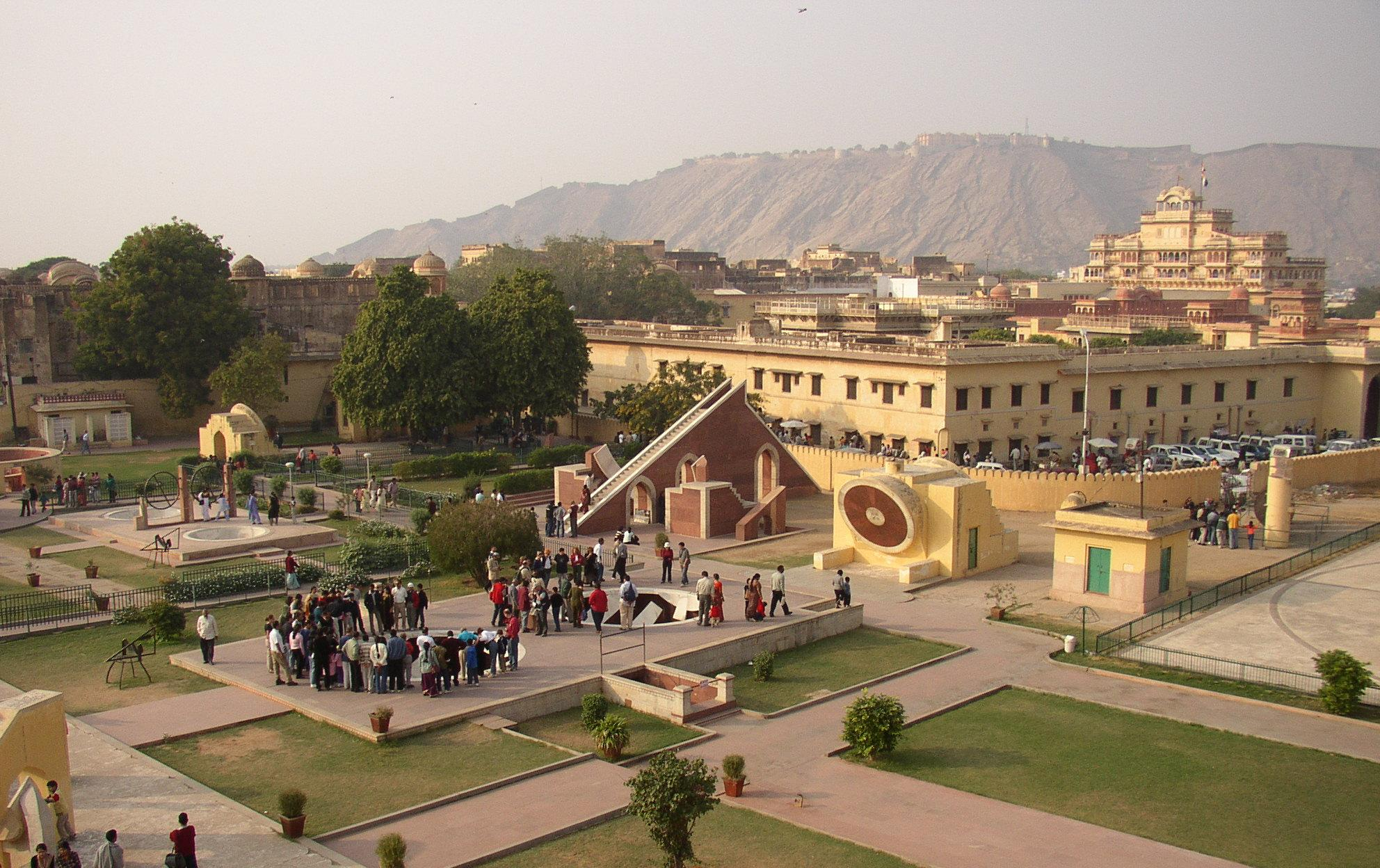
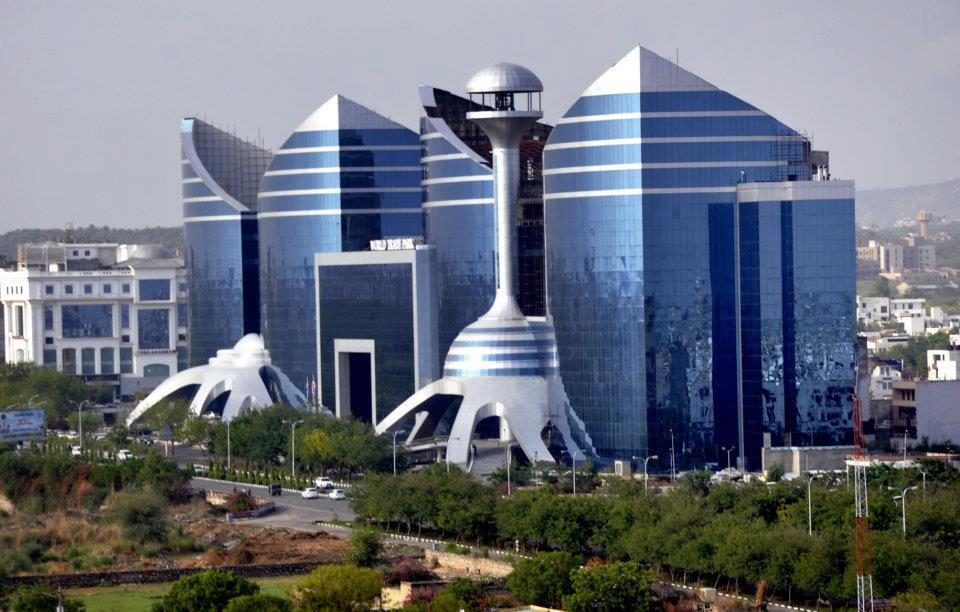
- Hawa Mahal City wall of Jaipur Amber Fort Birla Mandir Jal Mahal Albert Hall Museum Jantar Mantar World Trade Park
- Nickname: The Pink City
- Jaipur Location of Jaipur in Rajasthan Location of Jaipur in India Location of Jaipur in Asia
- Coordinates: 26.915°N 75.820°E
- Country: India
- State: Rajasthan
- District: Jaipur
- Founded: 18 November 1727; 298 years ago
- Founder: Sawai Jai Singh II

Government
  - Type: Municipal Corporation
  - Body: Jaipur Municipal Corporation
  - Mayor: Sunil Kothari (BJP)

Area
  - Total: 484.64 km^{2} (187.12 sq mi)
  - Rank: 1st in Rajasthan
- Elevation: 431 m (1,414 ft)

Population (2011)
  - Total: 3,046,163
  - Rank: 10th in India
  - Density: 6,285.4/km^{2} (16,279/sq mi)
- Demonyms: Jaipuri, Jaipurite

Language
  - Official: Hindi
  - Additional official: English
  - Regional: Dhundari
- Time zone: UTC+05:30 (IST)
- Pincode(s): 3020xx
- Area code(s): +91-141
- Vehicle registration: RJ-14 (Jaipur South); RJ-45 (Jaipur North); RJ-59; RJ-60
- GDP Nominal (Jaipur district): ₹192,668 crore (US$20 billion)
- Budget: ₹2,692.20 crore (US$280 million)
- Airport: Jaipur International Airport
- Rapid transit system: Jaipur Metro
- Website: jaipurmc.org

UNESCO World Heritage Site
- Official name: Jaipur City, Rajasthan
- Criteria: Cultural: (ii), (iv), (vi)
- Designated: 2019 (43rd session)
- Reference no.: 1605
- Region: Southern Asia

Jaipur (Rajasthani: Jayapura, pronounced [ˈd͡ʑɛpʊɾᵊ]) is the capital and largest city of the north-western Indian state of Rajasthan. As of 2011, the city had a population of 3.1 million, making it the tenth-most populous city in the country. Located 268 km (167 mi) from the national capital, New Delhi, Jaipur is also known as the Pink City due to the dominant colour scheme of its buildings in the old city.

Jaipur was founded in 1727 by Sawai Jai Singh II, the Kachhwaha Rajput ruler of Amer, after whom the city was named. It is one of the earliest planned cities of modern India, designed by Vidyadhar Bhattacharya. During the British colonial period, the city served as the capital of the princely state of Jaipur. After Indian independence in 1947, Jaipur became the capital of the newly formed state of Rajasthan in 1949.

Jaipur is a popular tourist destination in India, forming a part of the Golden Triangle tourist circuit along with Delhi and Agra. The city serves as a gateway to other tourist destinations in Rajasthan, such as Jodhpur, Jaisalmer, Bikaner, Udaipur, Bundi, Kota, and Mount Abu. The historic city center was inscribed on the UNESCO World Heritage List on 6 July 2019, joining the Jantar Mantar (inscribed in 2010) and the nearby Amer Fort (part of the Hill Forts of Rajasthan). The city has colloquially been referred to as the "Paris of India", and Nobel laureate C. V. Raman described it as the "Island of Glory".

== Etymology ==
Jaipur derives its name from Sawai Jai Singh II, the Kachhwaha ruler of Amer, who founded the city in 1727. In Sanskrit, variations of the suffix -pur or -pura denote a city or town; thus, "Jaipur" translates to "The City of Jai" or "Jai's City".

== History ==
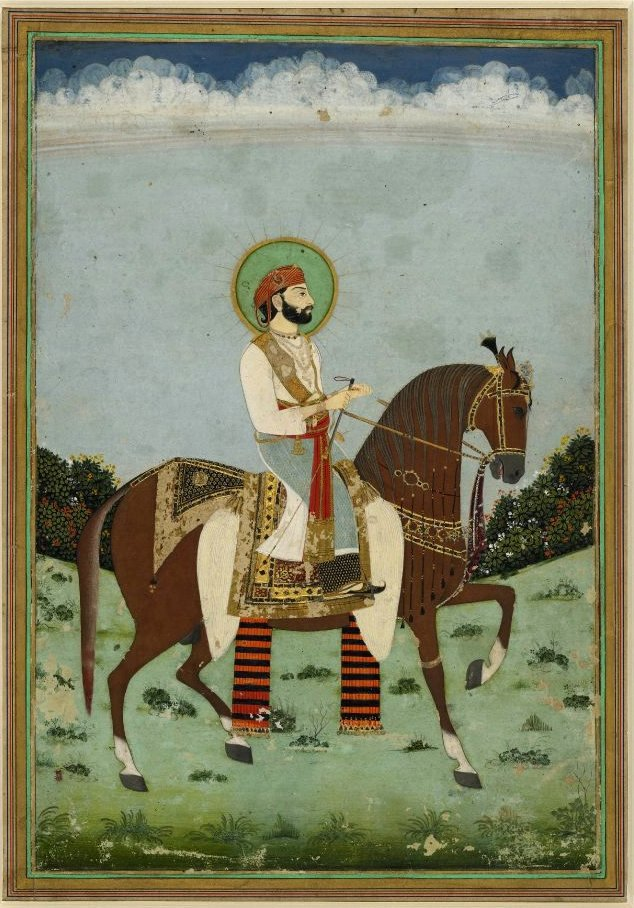
Sawai Jai Singh, the founder of Jaipur

Jaipur was founded on 18 November 1727 by Jai Singh II, the Kachhwaha Rajput ruler of Amer, who ruled the region from 1699 to 1743. He planned to shift his capital 11 km (7 mi) from Amer to accommodate a growing population and increasing water scarcity. Jai Singh consulted several architects and planned the city based on the principles of Vastu Shastra and Shilpa Shastra, under the architectural guidance of Vidyadhar Bhattacharya. The construction of the city began in 1726. During the rule of Sawai Ram Singh II, the city was painted pink to welcome Albert Edward, Prince of Wales in 1876. Many of the avenues remain painted in pink, giving Jaipur a distinctive appearance and the epithet "Pink City".

In the 19th century, the city grew rapidly, reaching a population of 160,000 by 1900. The wide boulevards were paved, and its chief industries included metalwork and marble, fostered by a school of art founded in 1868. In August 1981, large areas of the city, including the airport, were flooded following heavy rains from a cloudburst, resulting in eight deaths and extensive damage along the Dravyavati River. On 6 July 2019, the city was inscribed on the UNESCO World Heritage List.

== Geography ==
=== Topography ===
Jaipur is located in the eastern Rajasthan and covers a total area of 467 km^{2} (180 sq mi). The terrain generally slopes downwards from north to south and towards the southeast. The city is bordered by fertile alluvial plains to the east and south, while the northern and western margins feature hill chains and arid areas. The Aravalli range bounds the city, with the Nahargarh hills to the north and the Jhalana hills to the east.

The Dravyavati River serves as the city's primary drainage channel; however, by 2014, it had degenerated into an untreated sewage drain. To address this issue, a rejuvenation plan was developed by the Jaipur Development Authority (JDA) in 2015. A 13 km (8.1 mi) stretch of Dravyavati riverfront out of 47.5 km (29.5 mi) was opened following restoration in 2018, with the remaining project was completed in 2022.

=== Climate ===
Jaipur has a monsoon-influenced hot semi-arid climate (Köppen climate classification BSh) with long, extremely hot summers and short, mild to warm winters. Annual precipitation is over 625 millimetres (25 in), falling mostly in July and August due to the southwest monsoon, which causes average temperatures in these two months to be lower than in May and June. During the monsoon, frequent heavy rains and thunderstorms occur, though severe flooding is uncommon. The highest temperature recorded in the city was 49.0 °C (120.2 °F) on 23 May 1994. The average temperature remains below 20 °C (68 °F) between December and February, which are typically mild, dry, and pleasant. The lowest temperature recorded was −2.2 °C (28.0 °F), observed on 31 January 1905, 1 February 1905, and 16 January 1964. Jaipur, like many major cities worldwide, exhibits a prominent urban heat island effect, with surrounding rural temperatures occasionally dropping below freezing in winter.

Climate data for Jaipur (Jaipur International Airport) 1991–2020, extremes 1952–present
Month	Jan	Feb	Mar	Apr	May	Jun	Jul	Aug	Sep	Oct	Nov	Dec	Year
Record high °C (°F)	31.7 (89.1)	36.7 (98.1)	42.8 (109.0)	44.9 (112.8)	49.0 (120.2)	47.2 (117.0)	46.7 (116.1)	41.7 (107.1)	41.7 (107.1)	40.0 (104.0)	36.4 (97.5)	32.0 (89.6)	49.0 (120.2)
Mean daily maximum °C (°F)	22.5 (72.5)	26.1 (79.0)	32.0 (89.6)	37.6 (99.7)	41.1 (106.0)	39.7 (103.5)	34.8 (94.6)	32.7 (90.9)	34.2 (93.6)	34.1 (93.4)	29.6 (85.3)	25.1 (77.2)	32.5 (90.5)
Daily mean °C (°F)	15.3 (59.5)	19.1 (66.4)	24.9 (76.8)	30.1 (86.2)	34.1 (93.4)	33.5 (92.3)	30.1 (86.2)	28.5 (83.3)	28.8 (83.8)	27.0 (80.6)	21.9 (71.4)	17.1 (62.8)	25.9 (78.6)
Mean daily minimum °C (°F)	8.4 (47.1)	12.0 (53.6)	17.4 (63.3)	22.8 (73.0)	27.1 (80.8)	27.9 (82.2)	26.2 (79.2)	24.9 (76.8)	24.0 (75.2)	20.1 (68.2)	14.4 (57.9)	9.9 (49.8)	19.6 (67.3)
Record low °C (°F)	−2.2 (28.0)	−2.2 (28.0)	3.3 (37.9)	9.4 (48.9)	15.6 (60.1)	18.4 (65.1)	20.6 (69.1)	18.9 (66.0)	15.0 (59.0)	11.1 (52.0)	3.3 (37.9)	0.0 (32.0)	−2.2 (28.0)
Average rainfall mm (inches)	5.9 (0.23)	10.2 (0.40)	4.4 (0.17)	7.1 (0.28)	12.2 (0.48)	61.9 (2.44)	190.5 (7.50)	203.4 (8.01)	79.6 (3.13)	19.4 (0.76)	1.9 (0.07)	3.8 (0.15)	600.3 (23.63)
Average rainy days	0.6	0.9	0.7	0.9	1.3	4.2	9.8	9.4	4.8	1.2	0.2	0.3	34.3
Average relative humidity (%) (at 17:30 IST)	38	31	22	18	19	35	62	69	52	32	34	39	38
Average dew point °C (°F)	6 (43)	7 (45)	7 (45)	8 (46)	12 (54)	19 (66)	24 (75)	24 (75)	21 (70)	13 (55)	9 (48)	6 (43)	13 (55)
Average ultraviolet index	5	7	9	11	12	12	12	12	10	8	6	5	9.1
Source 1: India Meteorological Department Climate of Jaipur Time and Date (dewpoints, 2005–2015)
Source 2: Weather Atlas, Tokyo Climate Center (mean temperatures 1991–2020)

Jaipur has been ranked 33rd best "National Clean Air City" (under Category 1 >10L Population cities) in India.

== Demographics ==
Historical population
Year	Pop.	±%
1881	142,600	—
1891	158,900	+11.4%
1901	160,000	+0.7%
1911	137,100	−14.3%
1921	120,200	−12.3%
1931	144,200	+20.0%
1941	175,800	+21.9%
1951	291,000	+65.5%
1961	403,400	+38.6%
1968	533,200	+32.2%
1971	636,800	+19.4%
1981	1,004,700	+57.8%
1991	1,518,200	+51.1%
2001	2,322,575	+53.0%
2011	3,073,350	+32.3%
Source: Census of India

According to the 2011 census, the Jaipur Municipal Corporation had 599,507 households and a population of 3,046,163. Children under six years of age accounted for 387,354 (12.72%) of the population. The city had a sex ratio of 900 females per 1000 males and a literacy rate of 83.33% among those aged seven and above. Scheduled Castes and Scheduled Tribes constituted 392,285 (12.88%) and 115,258 (3.78%) of the population, respectively.

=== Languages ===
Languages of Jaipur (2011)
1. Hindi (69.7%)
2. Rajasthani (9.85%)
3. Urdu (5.86%)
4. Marwari (4.36%)
5. Dhundari (3.93%)
6. Sindhi (2.54%)
7. Others (3.77%)

The official language of Jaipur is Hindi, while English serves as an additional official language. The primary native dialect spoken in the city is Dhundari. Standard Hindi, Marwari and English are also widely spoken.

According to the 2011 census, residents recorded their first language as Hindi (69.69%), Rajasthani (9.85%), Urdu (5.86%), Marwari (4.36%), Dhundari (3.93%), and Sindhi (2.54%).

=== Religion ===
Religion in Jaipur City (2011)
Religion	Percent
Hinduism	77.91%
Islam	18.63%
Jainism	2.36%
Sikhism	0.58%
Other or not stated	0.52%
Distribution of religions

According to the 2011 census, Hindus form the majority religious group in Jaipur, accounting for 77.9% of the city's population, followed by Muslims (18.6%), Jains (2.4%), and others (1.1%).

== Government and politics ==
=== Administration ===
The Jaipur Development Authority serves as the primary planning body for the city. The Jaipur Municipal Corporation (JMC) was established in 1994. Covering an administration area of 467 km^{2} (180 sq mi), the corporation is headed by a mayor. In 2020, JMC was bifurcated into two separate municipal entities, namely the Greater Jaipur Municipal Corporation and the Jaipur Heritage Municipal Corporation with 150 and 100 wards respectively. The two bodies were re-merged in 2025 into a single municipal corporation consisting of 150 wards. Following the municipal elections held in September 2026, Sunil Kothari of the Bharatiya Janata Party was elected mayor after his party secured a majority of the wards. Administrative operations are overseen by the municipal commissioner alongside a team of executive officers. For the 2025–26 financial year, the combined estimated municipal budget is ₹2,692.20 crore (US$280 million). Primary municipal revenue sources include house tax, urban development tax, and octroi compensation, alongside various service fees and user charges. Law and order is maintained by the Jaipur City Police under the administrative jurisdiction of the state government. Civil and criminal legal matters in the city are adjudicated by the District and Sessions Court at Jaipur.

=== Politics ===
Jaipur consists of two parliamentary constituencies Jaipur and Jaipur Rural. The Jaipur Lok Sabha constituency comprises eight legislative assembly segments, all of which fall partly in Jaipur city.

=== Infrastructure ===
Jaipur Development Authority is the nodal government agency responsible for the planning and development of Jaipur. The municipal corporation is responsible for maintaining the city's civic infrastructure and carrying out associated administrative duties. Electricity is distributed through Jaipur Vidyut Vitaran Nigam Limited (JVVNL) owned by the Government of Rajasthan. Jaipur municipal corporaiton has a fire department wing with 11 fire stations and 50 fire tenders.

Established in 2018, Jaipur Water Supply and Sewerage Board (JWSSB) is responsible for the management of water supply and sewerage services in the city. The agency is responsible for water supply as per the standards stipulated by the Bureau of Indian Standards, the State Pollution Control Board and the Public Health Engineering Department (PHED). It will also be responsible for financing, designing, constructing, altering, repairing, operating, and maintaining various water supply and sewerage schemes in addition to commercial services such as meter reading, billing, and revenue collection. The city has been divided into four main drainage zones, with the northern and central zones draining into the Dravyavati river, while the western zone drains into the Chandler lake, and the eastern and southern areas combined drain into the Dhundh River. Sewerage systems and STPs have been constructed accordingly, with the installed capacity being 730 km of sewer lines and 442 MLD of sewage treatment. The corporation has a solid waste management system that includes door-to-door collection, transportation of garbage in covered vehicles, proper deployment of dustbins, use of modern equipment. The system ensures private investment as well as public participation with a small amount of monthly user charges. The size of the JMC garbage can be kept at a manageable level. Sanitation work in three zones has been contracted out to private agencies.

== Economy ==
As per the official records released by the Directorate of Economics and Statistics (Rajasthan), the GDP (nominal) of Jaipur district is estimated at INR 1,22,140 crores ($15.8 billion) in 2020–21, with a per-capita GDP of INR 141,305. In addition to its role as the provincial capital, educational, and administrative centre, the economy of Jaipur is fuelled by tourism, gemstone cutting, the manufacture of jewellery and luxury textiles, and information technology.

Three major trade promotion organisations have their offices in Jaipur: Federation of Indian Chambers of Commerce & Industry, (FICCI) the PHD Chamber of Commerce and Industry (PHDCCI) and the Confederation of Indian Industry (CII) which has its regional offices here. In 2008, Jaipur was ranked 31 among the 50 Emerging Global Outsourcing cities. Jaipur Stock Exchange was one of the regional stock exchanges in India and was founded in 1989 but was closed in March 2015.

Jaipur has emerged as a hub of automotive industries with JCB, Hero MotoCorp and Robert Bosch GmbH having their manufacturing plants in Jaipur. There are chemical manufacturers in the city including Emami and National Engineering Industries. The city is among top emerging IT hubs of India. Mahindra World City is an integrated business zone in Jaipur with several software and IT companies. The Government of Rajasthan have built Asia's largest incubator in Jaipur – the Bhamashah Techno Hub.

Jaipur is a major hub for arts and crafts. It has many traditional shops selling antiques, jewellery, handicrafts, gems, bangles, pottery, carpets, textiles, leather, and metal products. Jaipur is one of India's largest manufacturers of hand-knotted rugs. Jaipur foot, a rubber-based prosthetic leg for people with below-knee amputations, was designed and is produced in Jaipur. World Trade Park Jaipur, is a shopping mall in Jaipur opened in 2012.

== Culture and cityscape ==
=== Tourism ===
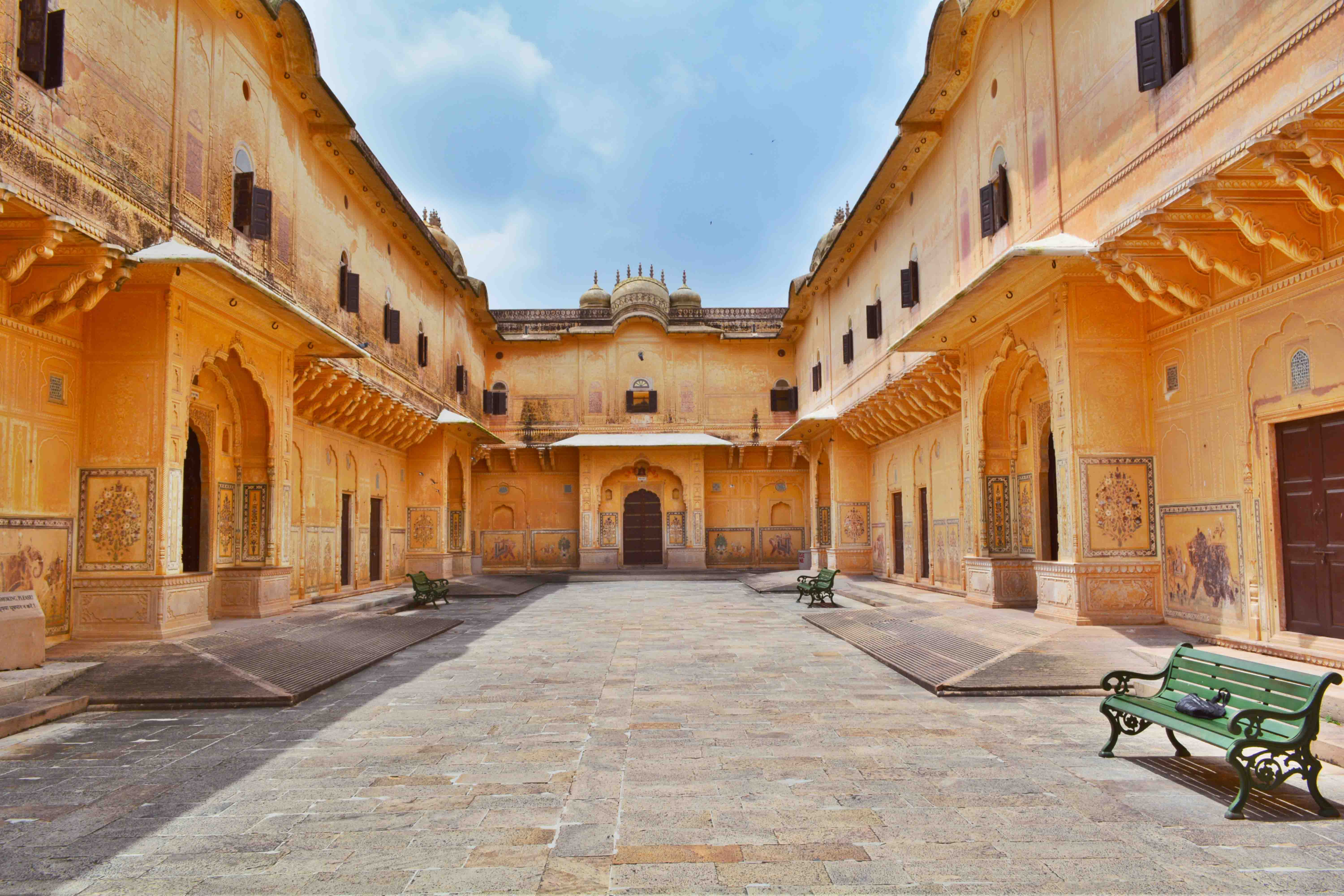
Nahargarh Fort

Jaipur is a major tourist destination in India forming a part of the Golden Triangle. In the 2008 Conde Nast Traveller Readers Choice Survey, Jaipur was ranked the seventh best place to visit in Asia. According to TripAdvisor's 2015 Traveller's Choice Awards, Jaipur was ranked first among the Indian destinations for the year. The Presidential Suite at the Raj Palace Hotel, billed at US$45,000 per night, was listed in second place on CNN's World's 15 most expensive hotel suites in 2012. Jaipur was ranked eighth in "The Top 15 Cities in Asia".

Jaipur Exhibition & Convention Centre (JECC) is Rajasthan's biggest convention and exhibition centre. Visitor attractions include the Albert Hall Museum, Hawa Mahal, Jal Mahal, City Palace, Amer Fort, Jantar Mantar, Nahargarh Fort, Jaigarh Fort, Birla Mandir, Galtaji, Govind Dev Ji Temple, Garh Ganesh Temple, Moti Dungri Ganesh Temple, Gator Chhatri, Sanghiji Jain temple and the Jaipur Zoo. The Jantar Mantar observatory, a collection of 19 astronomical instruments and Amer Fort are World Heritage Sites. Hawa Mahal is a five-storey pyramidal shaped monument with 953 windows that rises 15 metres (50 ft) from its high base. Sisodiya Rani Bagh and Kanak Vrindavan are the major parks in Jaipur. Sambhar Lake is about 56 kms from the city.

=== Culture ===
Jaipur has many cultural sites like Jawahar Kala Kendra established by Charles Correa and Ravindra Manch. The Government Central Museum hosts several art and antiquities. There is a government museum at Hawa Mahal and an art gallery at Viratnagar. There are statues depicting Rajasthani culture around the city. Jaipur has many traditional shops selling antiques and handicrafts, as well as contemporary brands reviving traditional techniques, such as Anokhi. The prior rulers of Jaipur patronised some arts and crafts. They invited skilled artisans, artists, and craftsmen from India and abroad who settled in the city. Some of the crafts include bandhani, block printing, stone carving and sculpture, tarkashi, zari, gota-patti, kinari and zardozi, silver jewellery, gems, kundan, meenakari and jewellery, Lakh ki Chudiya, miniature paintings, blue pottery, ivory carving, shellac work and leather ware.

Jaipur has its own performing arts. The Jaipur Gharana for Kathak is one of the three gharanas of the major north Indian classical dance form of Kathak. The Jaipur Gharana of Kathak is known for its rapid intricate dance forms, vivacious body movements and subtle Abhinaya. The Ghoomar is a popular folk dance style. Tamasha is an art form where Kathputli puppet dance is shown in play form. Major festivals celebrated in Jaipur include Elephant Festival, Gangaur, Makar Sankranti, Holi, Diwali, Vijayadashami, Teej, Eid, Mahavir Jayanti and Christmas. Jaipur is also famous for the Jaipur Literature Festival, the world's largest free literature festival in which authors, writers, and literature lovers from all over the country participate.

==== Architecture ====
The city was planned according to the Indian Vastu shastra by Vidyadhar Bhattacharya in 1727. Three gates are facing east, west, and north. The eastern gate is called Suraj pol (sun gate), the western gate is called Chand pol (moon gate) and the northern gate faces the ancestral capital of Amer. The architecture of the city was heavily influenced by the 17th century architectural renaissance during Mughal rule in Northern India. The city was divided into nine blocks, two of which contained the state buildings and palaces, with the remaining seven allotted to the public. Huge ramparts were built, pierced by seven fortified gates. The city is unusual among pre-modern Indian cities in the regularity of its streets, and the division of the city into six sectors by broad streets 34 m (111 ft) wide. The urban quarters are further divided by networks of gridded streets. Five-quarters wrap around the east, south, and west sides of a central palace quarter, with a sixth quarter immediately to the east. The Palace quarter encloses the Hawa Mahal palace complex, formal gardens, and a small lake. Nahargarh Fort, which was the residence of King Sawai Jai Singh II, crowns the hill in the northwest corner of the old city.

==== Cuisine ====
Typical dishes include Dal Baati Churma, Missi Roti, Gatte ki Sabzi, Lahsun ki chutney, Ker Sangri, Makke ki Ghat, Bajre ki Ghat, Bajre ki Roti and Laal Maans. Jaipur is also known for its sweets which include Ghevar, Feeni, Mawa Kachori, Gajak, Meethi thuli, Chauguni ke laddu, and Moong Thal. Additionally, Jaipur houses world-famous brands like Haldiram's, a popular snack chain.

== Transport ==
=== Air ===
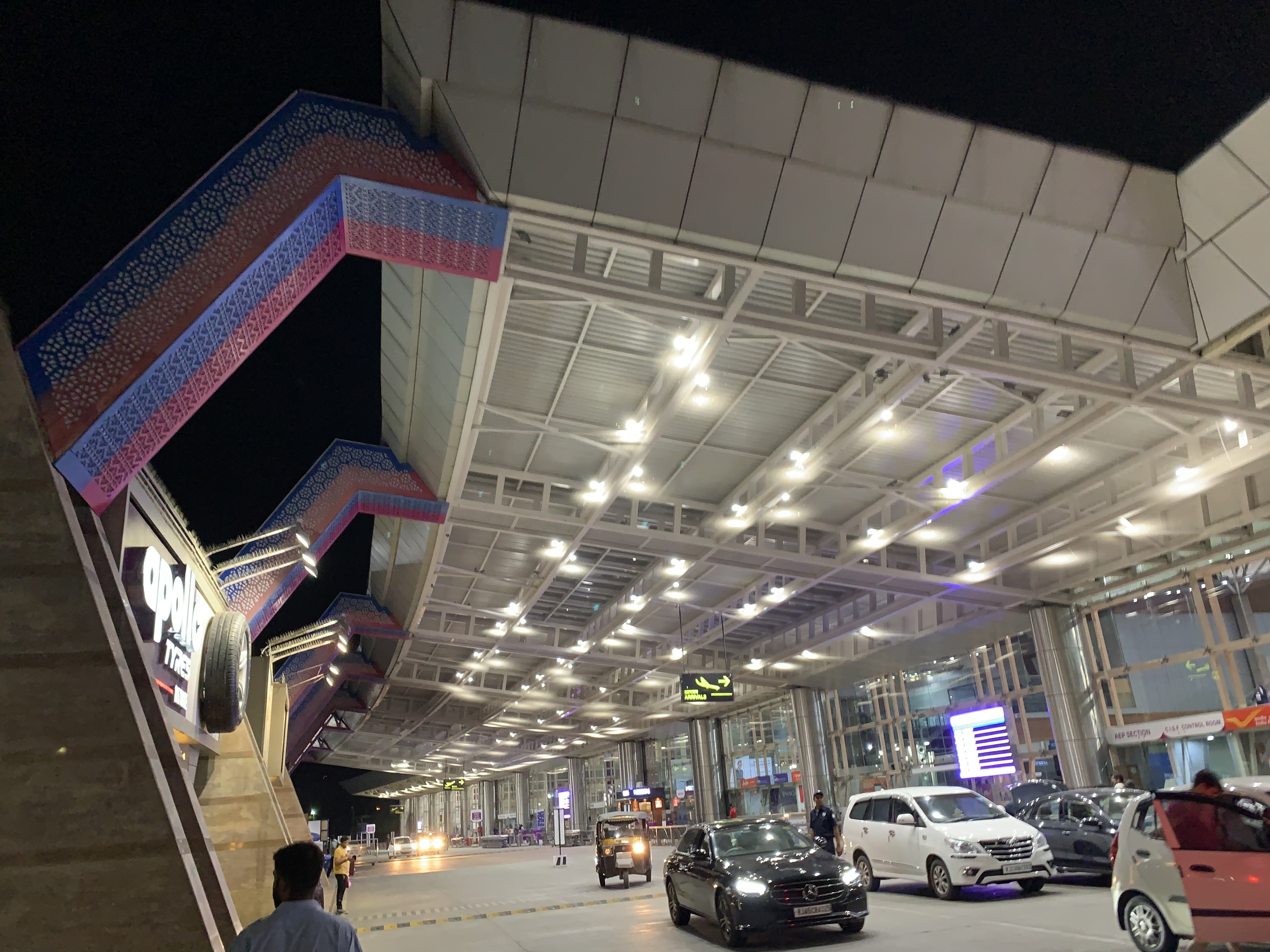
Jaipur International Airport

Jaipur International Airport is located in the southern suburb of Sanganer, which is located 13 km (8.1 mi) from Jaipur.It is the 13th busiest airport in India in daily scheduled flight operations. The airport handled 363,899 international and 2,540,451 domestic passengers in 2015–2016. Jaipur Airport also provides air cargo services. During winter, sometimes flights towards Indira Gandhi International Airport are diverted to Jaipur Airport due to heavy fog in Delhi. The airport was granted the status of international airport on 29 December 2005. The airport's apron can accommodate 14 aircraft, and the new integrated terminal building can handle up to 1,000 passengers at peak hours.

=== Rail ===
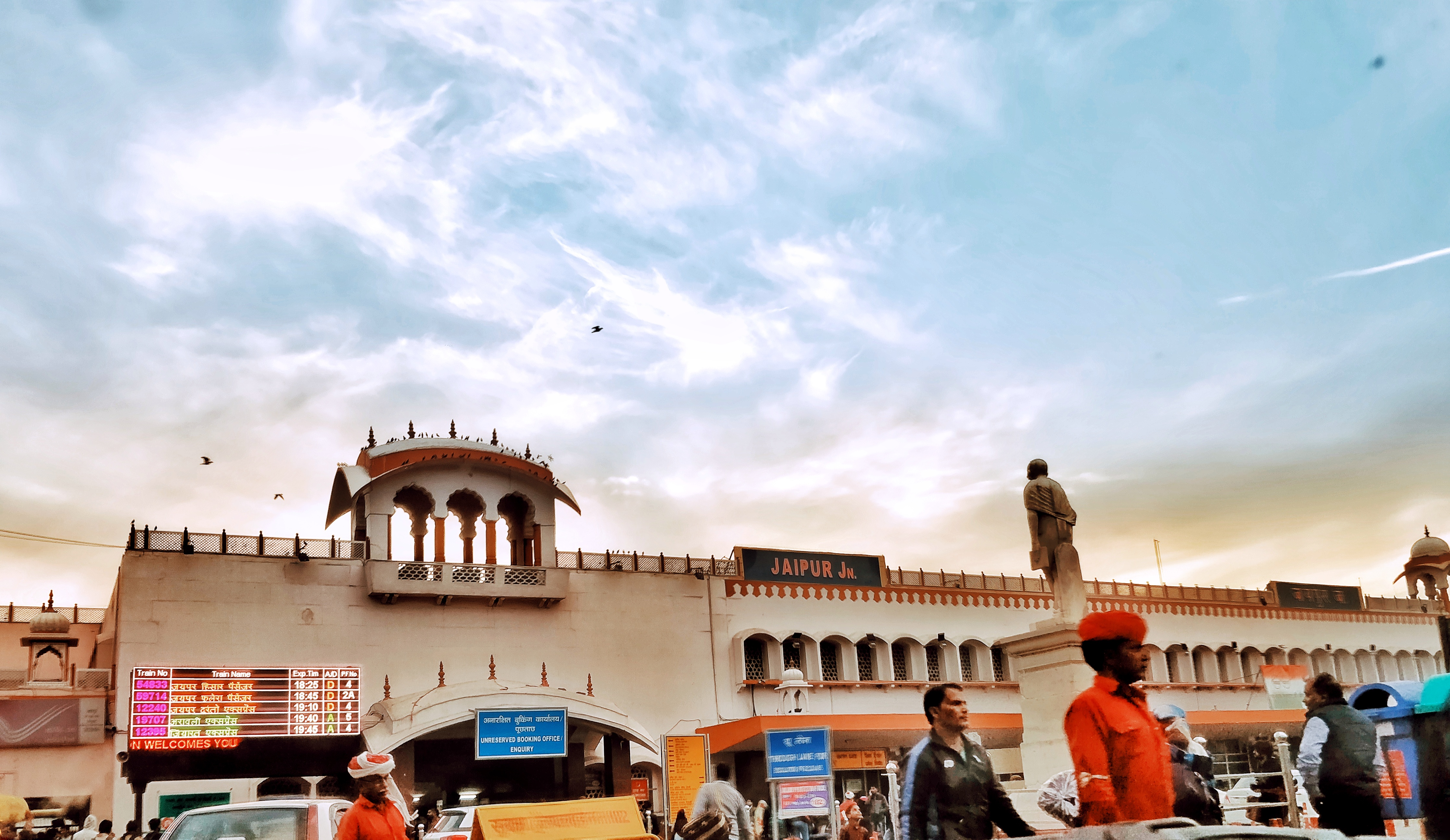
Jaipur Junction Railway Station

Jaipur Junction railway station was built in 1875 and is situated at the centre of Rajasthan. Serving almost 35,000 passengers daily, Jaipur Junction is the busiest station in Rajasthan. The cornerstone of the existing Jaipur railway station building was laid on 4 May 1956 by Maharaja Sawai Man Singh II of Jaipur, and construction took three years to complete. The station harnesses solar energy technology to power its operations. Jaipur is the headquarters of Jaipur Railway division and North Western Railway Zone of Indian Railways. Jaipur Junction is the busiest station in Rajasthan with more than 45,000 passengers daily. During Meter Gauge era, The fastest MG Train of India & the world, Pink City Express used to connect Jaipur with Delhi. Covering the 308.2 kilometres (191.5 mi) distance in 5 hrs 30 mins time, running at a record 56 kilometres per hour (35 mph) speed until 1997. In 1997 Pink City Express got replaced by now running 12015/12016 Ajmer Shatabdi Express

Metro

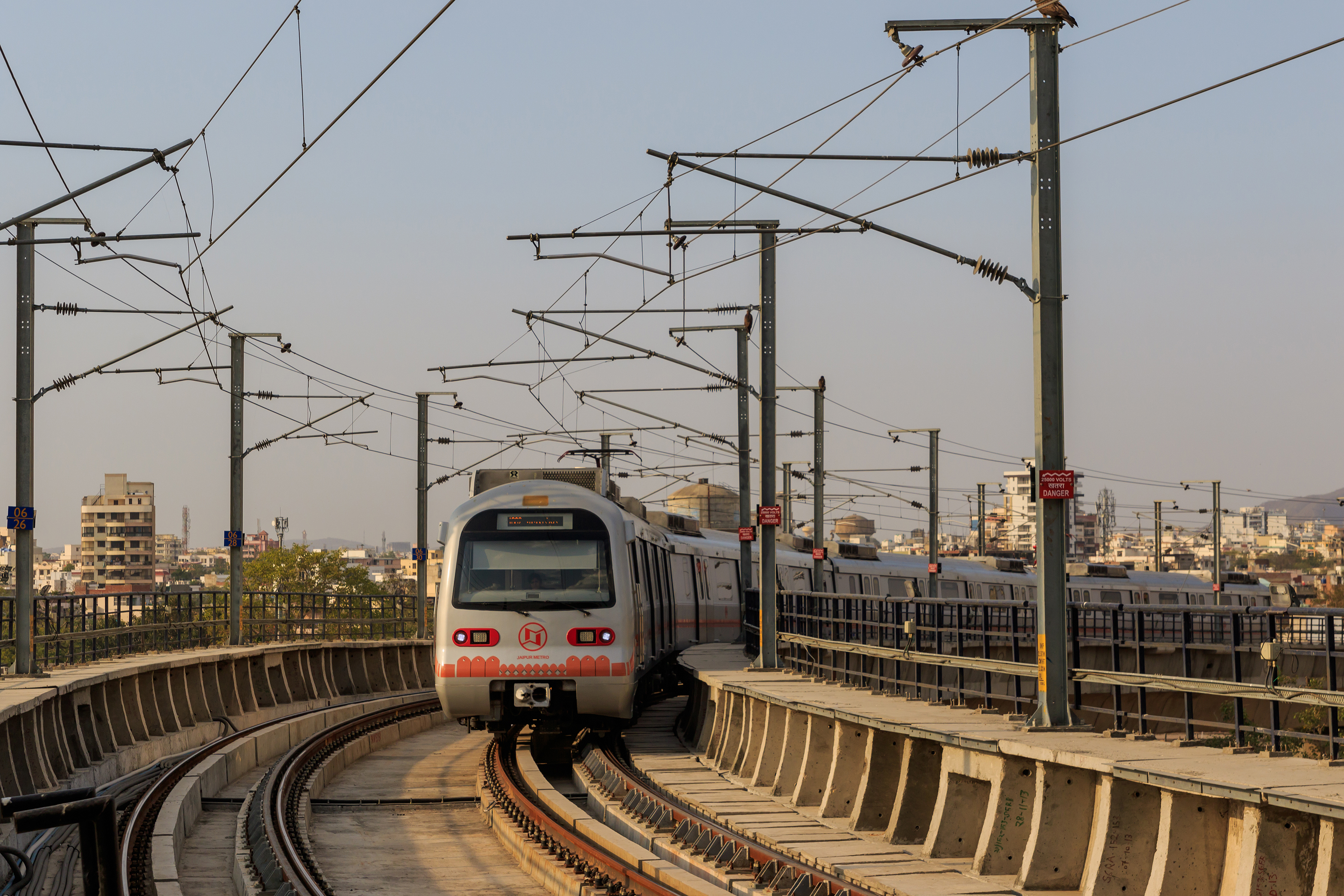
Jaipur Metro

Jaipur Metro commenced commercial operation on 3 June 2015. Construction on the mostly elevated part of the first line, called Phase 1A, comprising 9.63 kilometres (5.98 mi) of route from Mansarovar to Chandpole Bazaar, started in November 2010, and was completed in 2014. The Jaipur Metro began commercial service between Chandpole and Mansarovar on 3 June 2015. The Jaipur Metro Rail system is India's sixth metro rail system. The Jaipur Metro is the first metro in India to run on a triple-storey elevated road and metro track. Phase 1-B, from Chandpole to Badi Chaupar, began operation on 23 September 2020. Phase-1A is operational between Mansarovar and Chandpole consisting of nine stations namely Mansarovar, New Aatish Market, Vivek Vihar, Shyam Nagar, Ram Nagar, Civil Line, Railway Station, Sindhi Camp and Chandpole. The Phase-1B was constructed with an estimated cost of ₹97.32 billion ($1.74 billion). It became operational on 23 September 2020.

=== Road ===
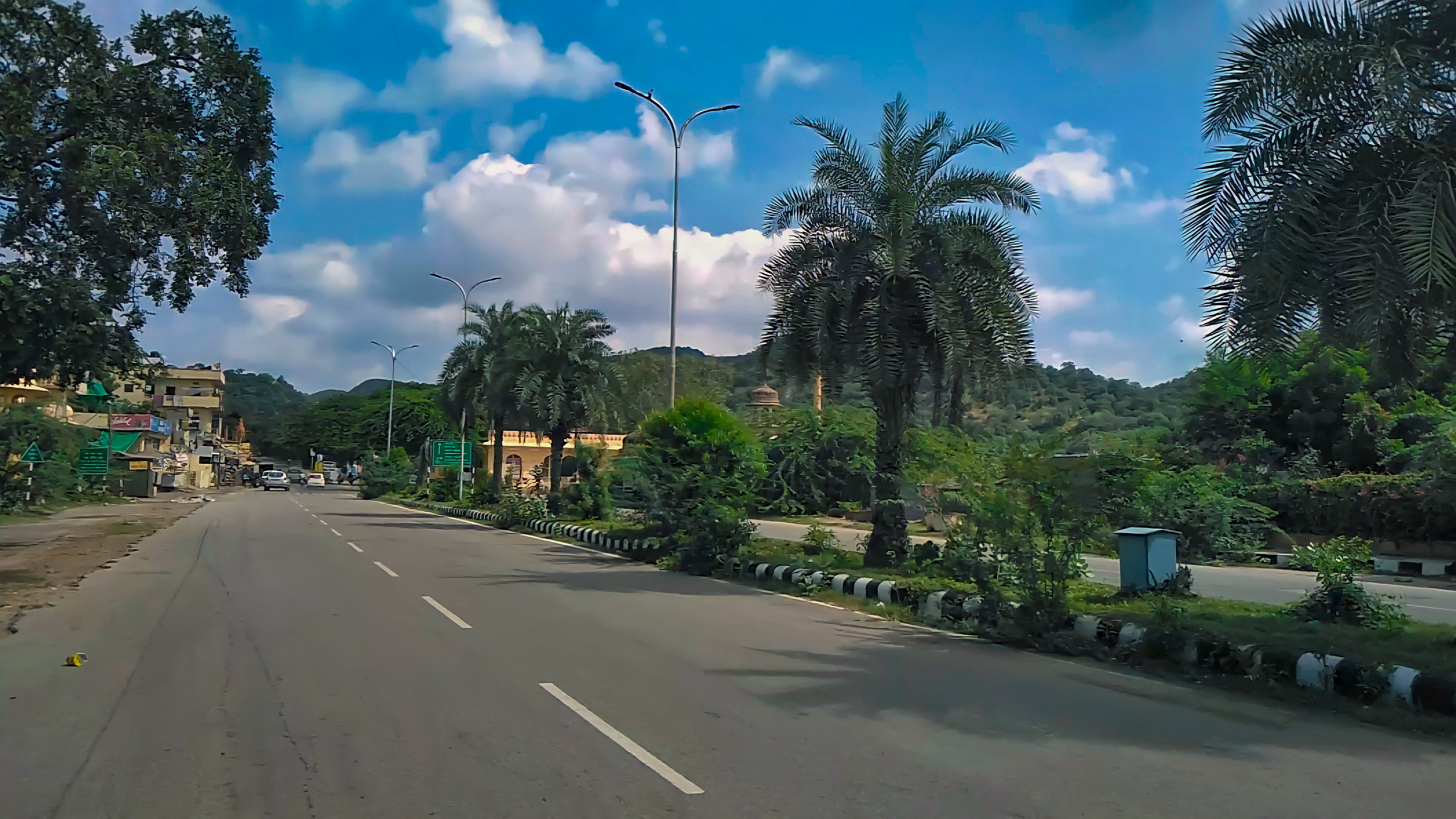
Way to Amer Fort (Amber Fort) Jaipur

Jaipur is located on National Highway No.48 connecting Delhi and Mumbai. National Highway 52 links Jaipur with Kota and National Highway 21 links Jaipur with Agra. RSRTC operates bus service to major cities in Rajasthan and other states of New Delhi, Uttar Pradesh, Haryana, Madhya Pradesh, Maharashtra, Punjab and Gujarat. City buses are operated by Jaipur City Transport Services Limited (JCTSL) of RSRTC. The service operates more than 400 regular and low-floor buses. Major bus depots are located at Vaishali Nagar, Vidyadhar Nagar, and Sanganer. Jaipur BRTS was approved by the government in August 2006. Jaipur BRTS is managed by JCSTL, a special-purpose vehicle formed by Jaipur Development Authority and Jaipur Nagar Nigam. In Phase I, two corridors have been proposed: a "North-South Corridor" from Sikar Road to Tonk Road and an "East-West Corridor" from Ajmer Road to Delhi Road. A section of the North-South Corridor from the bypass near Harmada to Pani Pech became operational in 2010. Jaipur Ring Road is a project of Jaipur Development Authority to reduce increasing traffic of Jaipur city which connects NH-21 (Agra Road), NH-48 (Ajmer Road), NH-52 (Tonk Road), and NH-52 (Malpura Road) having a length of 150 km. The 57 km out of 150 km long six-lane Jaipur Ring Road has been completed at Rs. 1217 crore. Bhawani Singh Road, which begins from Nehru Sahkar Bhawan and ends at the intersection where Birla Mandir is situated and hosts notable places like Rambagh Palace, the Golf Club, and Jaipur Development Authority Office falling on its path.

== Education ==
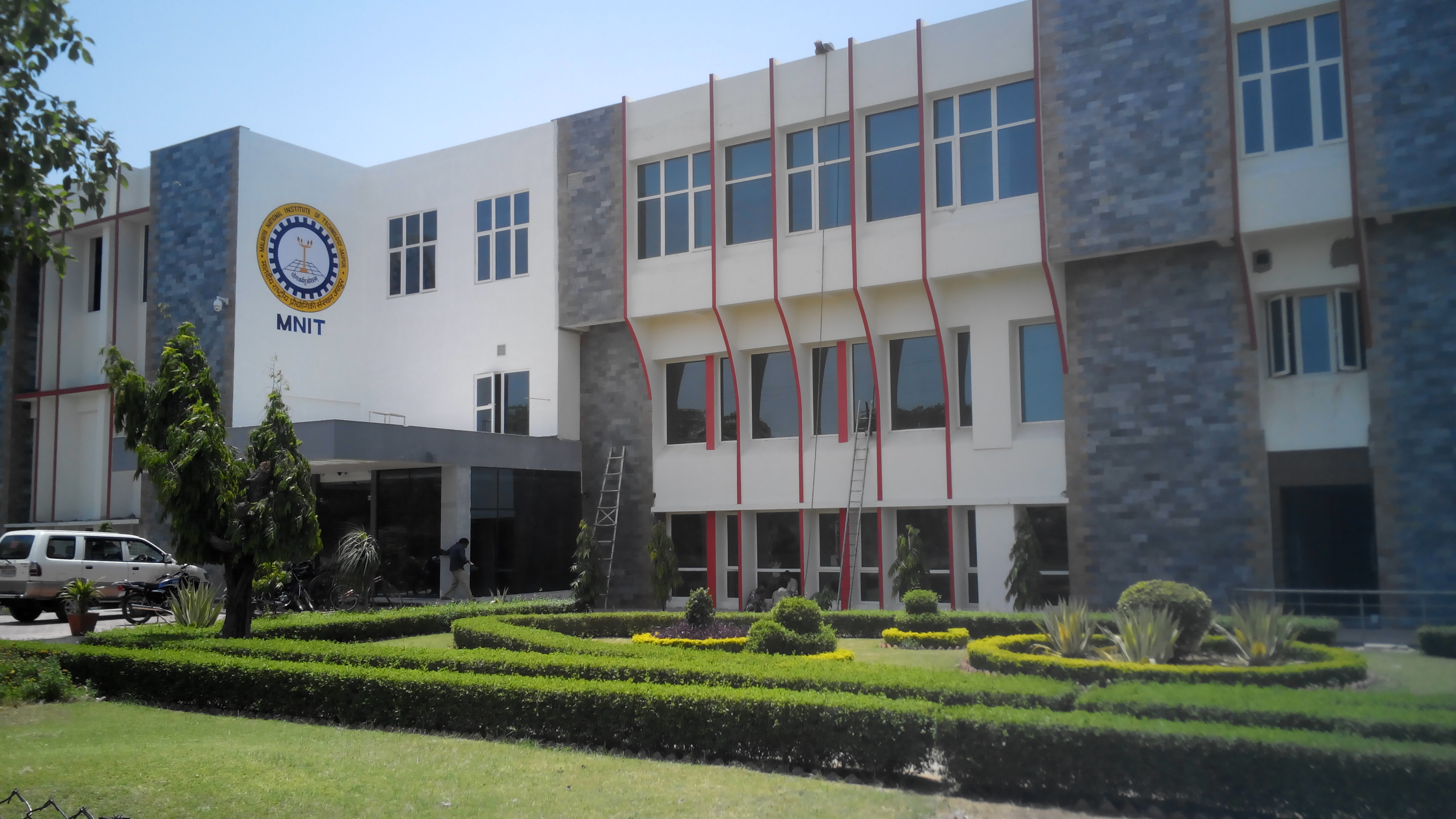
Malaviya National Institute of Technology, Jaipur

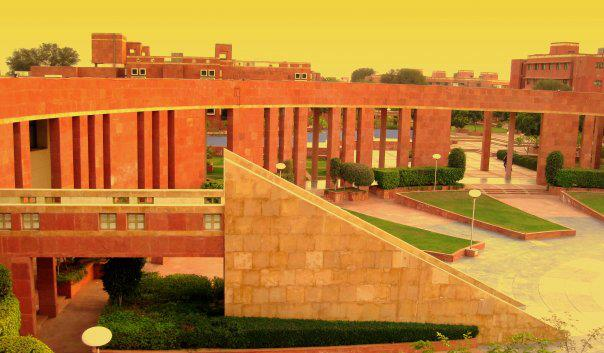
LNM Institute of Information Technology

The city had three colleges, including a Sanskrit college (1865) and a girls' school (1867) opened during the reign of the Maharaja Ram Singh II. Public and private schools in Jaipur are governed by the Central Board of Secondary Education or Board of Secondary Education, Rajasthan, International Board of education and follow a "10+2" plan. This plan entails eight years of primary education and four years of secondary education. The secondary school includes two years of upper secondary education, which is more specific and diverse than the two years of lower secondary education before it. Languages of instruction include English and Hindi. Notable institutions in the city are: University of Rajasthan, Rajasthan University of Health Sciences, ARCH Academy of Design, Dr. Bhimrao Ambedkar Law University, Rajasthan Sanskrit University, Haridev Joshi University of Journalism and Mass Communication, Suresh Gyan Vihar University, Malaviya National Institute of Technology, LNM Institute of Information Technology, National Institute of Ayurveda, Sawai Man Singh Medical College, Subodh College and Vedic Kanya College. Admission to Engineering colleges in Jaipur, many of which are affiliated to Rajasthan Technical University (Kota), is through the Rajasthan Engineering Admission Process. Some of the colleges that are affiliated to Rajasthan Technical University are Maharishi Arvind Institute of Engineering & Technology, Poornima College of Engineering, Arya Group of Colleges.

== Communication ==
Major telecommunication providers include Airtel, Jio, VI (Vodafone-Idea), and BSNL which are providing mobile telephony and there are also various internet service providers in the city. The government of Rajasthan has started free WiFi at various public places like Central Park, Jantar Mantar, among others. Rajasthan's first ISP, Data Ingenious Global Limited still providing a large number of broadband customers and email services in the entire Jaipur.

=== Media ===
Major daily newspapers in Jaipur include Amar Ujala, Rajasthan Patrika, Dainik Bhaskar, Indian Express, Dainik Navajyoti and The Times of India. The state-owned All India Radio is broadcast both on the medium wave and FM band in the city. Private FM stations include Radio Mirchi (98.3 MHz), Radio City (91.1 MHz), My FM (94.3 MHz), FM Tadka 95 FM (95.0 MHz), Mirchi Love (104.0 MHz), Red FM 93.5 (93.5 MHz) and Gyan Vani (105.6 MHz). The city has a community FM channel in FM Radio 7 (90.4 MHz) by India International School Institutional Network. The public broadcaster Doordarshan (Prasar Bharati) provides a regional channel in addition to the private broadcasters.

== Sports ==
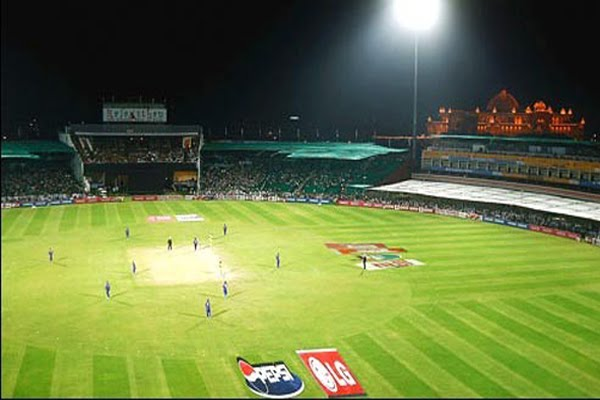
Sawai Mansingh Stadium

The main cricket stadium in the city, Sawai Mansingh Stadium, has a seating capacity of 30,000 and has hosted national and international cricket matches. It is also the home ground of IPL team Rajasthan Royals. Sawai Mansingh Indoor Stadium, Chaugan Stadium and Railway Cricket Ground are the other sporting arenas in the city. A new stadium has been proposed for Chonp Village with a seating capacity 75,000. It would be the third-largest cricket stadium in the world after the Narendra Modi Stadium and the Melbourne Cricket Ground. The city is represented in the IPL by Rajasthan Royals (2008–2016; 2018–present) and in Pro Kabaddi League by Jaipur Pink Panthers.

== In popular culture ==
Paul McCartney wrote and recorded the Jaipur tribute song "Riding into Jaipur" (4:08) on his 2001 studio album Driving Rain.

Jaipur is the setting for the film The Best Exotic Marigold Hotel and its sequel, The Second Best Exotic Marigold Hotel, which follow the adventures of a group of senior European immigrants who retire to Jaipur and in the process discover their true selves.

The opening song of the Mountain Goats' 2000 album The Coroner's Gambit, "Jaipur," describes the narrator's arrival at "the gates of the fabled pink city."

== Notable people ==
- Ila Arun
- Asrani, actor
- Smita Bansal, actress
- Daulat Mal Bhandari
- Vikrant Bhargava
- Vishwa Mohan Bhatt
- Apurvi Chandela
- Ajay Data, entrepreneur
- Gayatri Devi, royal
- Bhupendra Jadawat, actor
- Anshu Jain, banker
- Syed Akbar Jaipuri, poet
- Hasrat Jaipuri, poet and lyricist
- Mungtu Ram Jaipuria, industrialist and educationist
- Rajaram Jaipuria, industrialist and educationist
- Ravi Jaipuria, businessman
- Sitaram Jaipuria, politician
- Irrfan Khan, actor
- Habib Miyan, the oldest man in the world
- Aditya J Patwardhan, film producer and director
- Ravi Kumar Punia, soccer player
- Rohit Purohit, actor
- Jesse Randhawa
- Kamal Singh Saroha, businessman
- Man Singh II, royal
- Ashish Sharma
- Shubhi Sharma, actress
- Sunil Vaswani
- Hafiz Salahuddin Yusuf

== See also ==
- History of Jaipur
- List of districts of Rajasthan
- Outline of Rajasthan
- Largest Indian cities by GDP
