= Civil Lines (disambiguation) =

Civil Lines may refer to:

== Residential Area ==
Civil Lines is a number of residential areas built during the British Raj, present in several towns and cities of the Indian subcontinent.

- Civil Lines, Allahabad, India
- Civil Lines, Bareilly, India
- Civil Lines, Budaun, India
- Civil Lines, Delhi, India
  - Civil Lines (Delhi Metro), a station of Delhi Metro rail
- Civil Lines, Jaipur, India
  - Civil Lines metro station (Jaipur), India
  - Civil Lines (Rajasthan Assembly constituency)
- Civil Lines, Karachi, Pakistan
- Civil Lines, Moradabad, India

== Publications ==
- Civil Lines (magazine), a 1990s Indian magazine

== See also ==
- Civil Lines metro station (disambiguation)
