= Rupper Kalan =

Village in Rawalpindi District, Punjab, Pakistan

- Village
- Location in Pakistan
- Coordinates: 33.2668°N 72.8796°E
- Country: Pakistan
- Province: Punjab
- District: Rawalpindi District
- Tehsil: Rawalpindi Tehsil
- Time zone: UTC+5 (PST)

Rupper Kallan (روپڑ کلاں) is a village located in Rawalpindi District, Punjab, Pakistan. It is situated near Chak Beli Khan and falls under the jurisdiction of Rawalpindi Tehsil.

== Location and geography ==
Rupper Kallan is located south of the city of Rawalpindi, in the Pothohar region. It is accessible by road from Chak Beli Khan and nearby rural settlements. The area has a semi-arid climate with hot summers and mild winters.

Distances from Rupper Kalan
| Location | Distance (approx.) |
|---|---|
| Chak Beli Khan | 12 km |
| Rawalpindi | 50 km |
| Islamabad | 60 km |
| Chakwal | 45 km |

== Demographics ==
The residents of Rupper Kallan primarily speak Punjabi and Urdu. Sunni Islam is the predominant religion.

== Education and Facilities ==
The village has a government-run primary school. Basic services such as electricity supply are available, while more extensive facilities are available in Chak Beli Khan and Rawalpindi.

== Rupper Sharif Darbar ==
Rupper Kallan is home to the Rupper Sharif Darbar, a local Sufi shrine affiliated with the Naqshbandi spiritual order. The shrine was established by Shaikh Ahmad Ji Usmani, a disciple in the Naqshbandi lineage. It remains a local religious center, with custodianship continuing through his descendants.
