= Civil Lines metro station =

Civil Lines metro station may refer to these metro stations in India:

- Civil Lines metro station (Delhi)
- Civil Lines metro station (Jaipur)

== See also ==
- Civil Lines (disambiguation)
