= The Oberoi Rajvilas =

Hotel in Jaipur, India

- Hotel chain: Oberoi Hotels & Resorts

General information
- Location: Jaipur, India, Babaji Ka Modh, Goner Road; Jaipur, Rajasthan 302031
- Coordinates: 26.8761°N 75.8826°E
- Opening: 1997
- Owner: EIH Limited
- Operator: Oberoi Hotels & Resorts

Technical details
- Floor area: 32 acres

Other information
- Number of rooms: 71
- Number of restaurants: 3

Website
- Official website

The Oberoi Rajvilas, Jaipur is a luxury hotel and resort in Jaipur, Rajasthan, India. It was opened in 1997 and is operated by The Oberoi Group through EIH Limited. The property is set on a 32-acre site and was designed in a style inspired by traditional Rajput architecture. In 2024, the property was ranked number one globally in Travel + Leisure magazine's World's Best Awards.

== History ==
The Oberoi Rajvilas opened in 1997 during the expansion of The Oberoi Group under Prithvi Raj Singh Oberoi, who introduced the "Vilas" line of resorts. It was the first property developed under this portfolio.

== Operations ==
The Oberoi Rajvilas has 71 accommodation units comprising rooms, villas, and luxury tents. The tents are designed with reference to traditional caravan camps. Dining facilities at the resort include Surya Mahal, which offers international cuisine, and Raj Mahal, which focuses on Indian dishes, as well as the Rajwada Library Bar.

== Architecture ==
The Oberoi Rajvilas is designed in a style influenced by traditional Rajasthani architecture. The resort is spread across a 32-acre site and is laid out with a series of courtyards, gardens, and water features. The design of the hotel was inspired by the 19th-century Naila Fort. The property incorporates pink lime-plaster walls, Mughal arches, turrets, water channels and domed pavilions.

The buildings include elements associated with Rajput architecture, such as domed structures and the use of sandstone. The property incorporates an 18th-century Shiva temple and a restored 300-year-old haveli.

== Notable residents ==
Notable guests at the resort have included former United States President Bill Clinton, actors Brad Pitt and Angelina Jolie, model Naomi Campbell, and members of the British royal family, including the Duke and Duchess of Kent.

In March 2000, during a state visit to India, President Bill Clinton and his daughter Chelsea Clinton stayed at the resort's Kohinoor Villa. Security arrangements required the resort to be reserved for the presidential delegation, resulting in the cancellation of existing bookings, including those of foreign visitors.

== Awards and recognition ==
The hotel has appeared in Condé Nast Traveler's Readers' Choice Awards in multiple years, including 2017, 2018, 2019, 2022, 2023, 2024, and 2025. In October 2025, it received a one-key rating in the Michelin Guide's inaugural hotel selection for India.

In 2024, it was ranked first in the World's Best Awards published by Travel + Leisure. In the same year, the hotel was featured in the BBC Studios documentary series Grand Indian Hotel, which examines its operations. In 2013, the hotel was listed in Robb Report's "100 Hotels: Asia & The Pacific". In 2011, The Wall Street Journal ranked The Oberoi Rajvilas seventh in its list of India's 10 most expensive hotels.
