= Maidens Hotel, Delhi =

Hotel in New Delhi, India

Coordinates: 28.564448°N 77.226193°E

Maidens Hotel
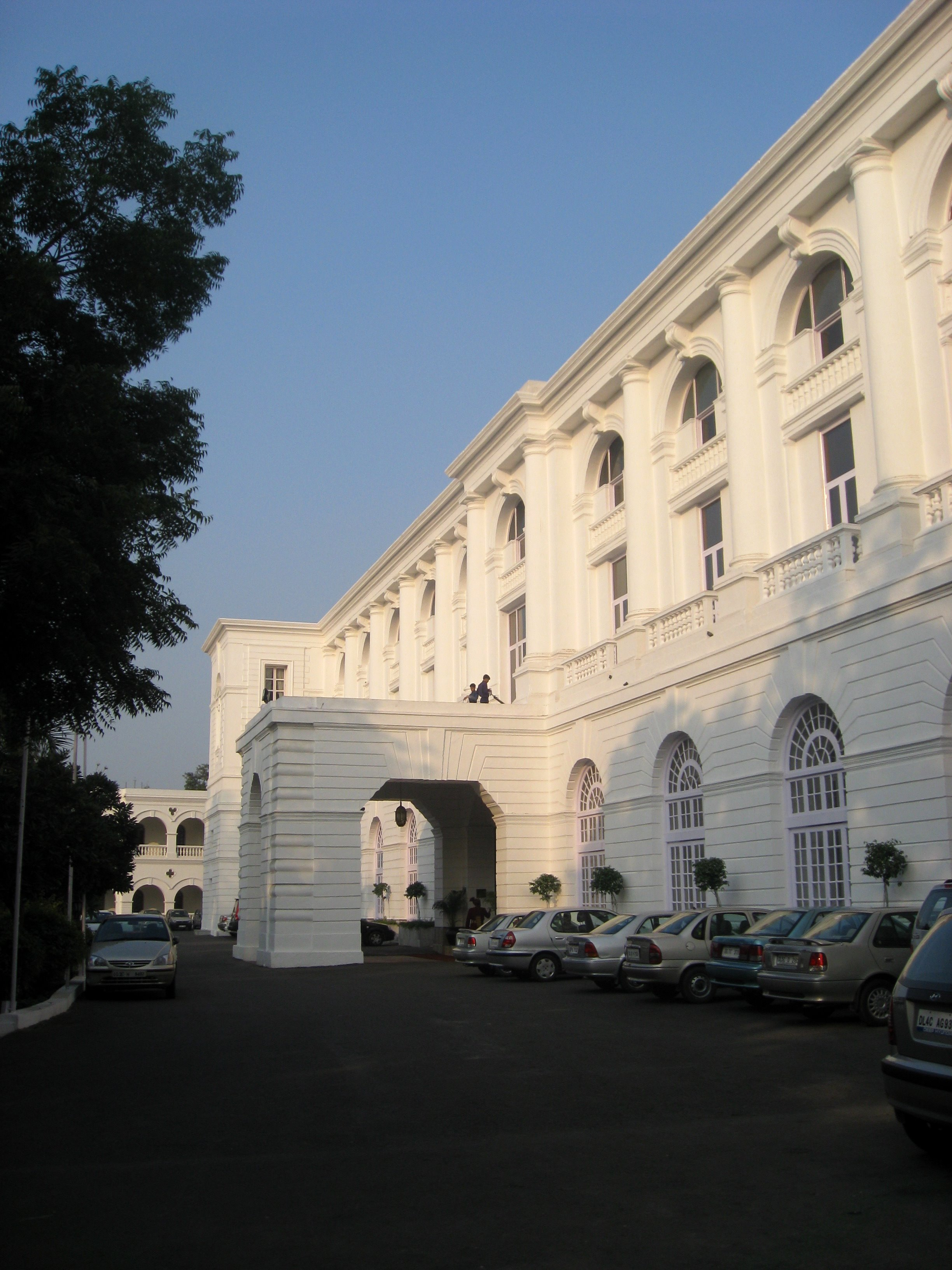
- Interactive map of the Maidens Hotel area
- Hotel chain: Oberoi Hotels & Resorts

General information
- Location: Civil Lines, Delhi
- Opening: 1903

Website
- www.maidenshotel.com

Maidens Hotel, Delhi, an Oberoi Group hotel, originally known as Maiden's Metropolitan Hotel, is a heritage hotel in the Civil Lines area of Delhi, India. It was opened in 1903 in its present location. Originally painted a striking red, the hotel’s exterior was later refreshed to a pearl‑white facade with lush jade‑toned meadows, reflecting its evolution from grand colonial landmark to modern heritage property. It has British Colonial architecture features like arched windows, classical columns, high‑ceilinged interiors and polished wooden floors.

== History ==
A 1908 travel handbook advertising the Maiden's Metropolitan Hotel in Delhi

The original hotel (Metropolitan Hotel) was jointly run by two Englishmen brothers, the Maiden brothers, from 1894 onwards, and in its present location by one of them, J. Maiden, from 1903 onwards. In the early 20th century, the hotel was widely considered to be the best hotel in Delhi. At the time of the 1903 Coronation Durbar held by Lord Curzon to celebrate the coronation of Edward VII as Emperor of India, the Metropolitan Hotel was the most sought after hotel accommodation in Delhi and the most expensive. The hotel was originally painted in Red in its early days.

== Architecture ==
Maidens Hotel exemplifies British Colonial heritage architecture and interiors, reflecting an old-world European charm. Its design is characterized by a pearl-white facade and lush jade toned Meadows. The building features a grand facade with arched windows and columns, complementing its beautifully landscaped lawn and palm trees. Inside, the hotel boasts high ceilings and retains a colonial ambiance. The rooms have a blend of old-style features and modern amenities like air conditioning. Some rooms are described as having polished wooden floors and traditional furnishings.

== See also ==
- Ludlow Castle, Delhi
- List of hotels in Delhi
