= Model Town (Delhi) =

Model Town, Delhi
- Neighborhood of Delhi
- Location in Delhi, India
- Coordinates: 28.7180°N 77.1916°E
- Country: India
- State: Delhi
- District: North West Delhi

Government
  - Body: North Delhi Municipal Corporation

Languages
  - Official: Hindi, English, Punjabi
- Time zone: UTC+5:30 (IST)
- Postal code: 110009
- Lok Sabha constituency: North Delhi
- Vidhan Sabha constituency: Model Town
- Civic agency: NDMC

Model Town is an upscale neighbourhood situated in North Delhi, India. It was built in the early 1950s by the DLF Group, then known as Delhi Land and Finance, and is one of the first privately developed neighborhoods in Delhi. Model Town is a large area and divided into blocks and sub-colonies. It is one of the three administrative divisions of the North Delhi district, along with Alipur and Narela.

== History ==
The Model Town site was initially part of the Delhi Town Planning Committee's preferred location for New Delhi in 1912. The land north of Shahjahanabad was favored for its continuity with the old city and its inclusion of the Civil Lines area. This region was also linked to the Delhi Durbars, where the coronation ceremonies of three British monarchs took place.

The site for New Delhi was moved to Raisina Hill, south of Shahjahanabad, due to land acquisition costs and the desire to create new symbolism for the city, distancing it from the old city.

By the 1940s, Model Town's aristocratic landowners partnered with DLF to develop their estate into a neighborhood, becoming one of the best planned areas before the 1962 master plan. This affluent residential area was Delhi's first elite neighborhood post-independence.

== Neighbourhood ==
The Imperial Town Planning Movement led to the creation of New Delhi, Model Town, and Civil Lines, promoting low-rise development with large plots, single-storey buildings, and a maximum ground coverage of 25%.

Model Town is divided into 3 sub-colonies; Model Town - I, Model Town - II & Model Town - III.

== Accessibility ==
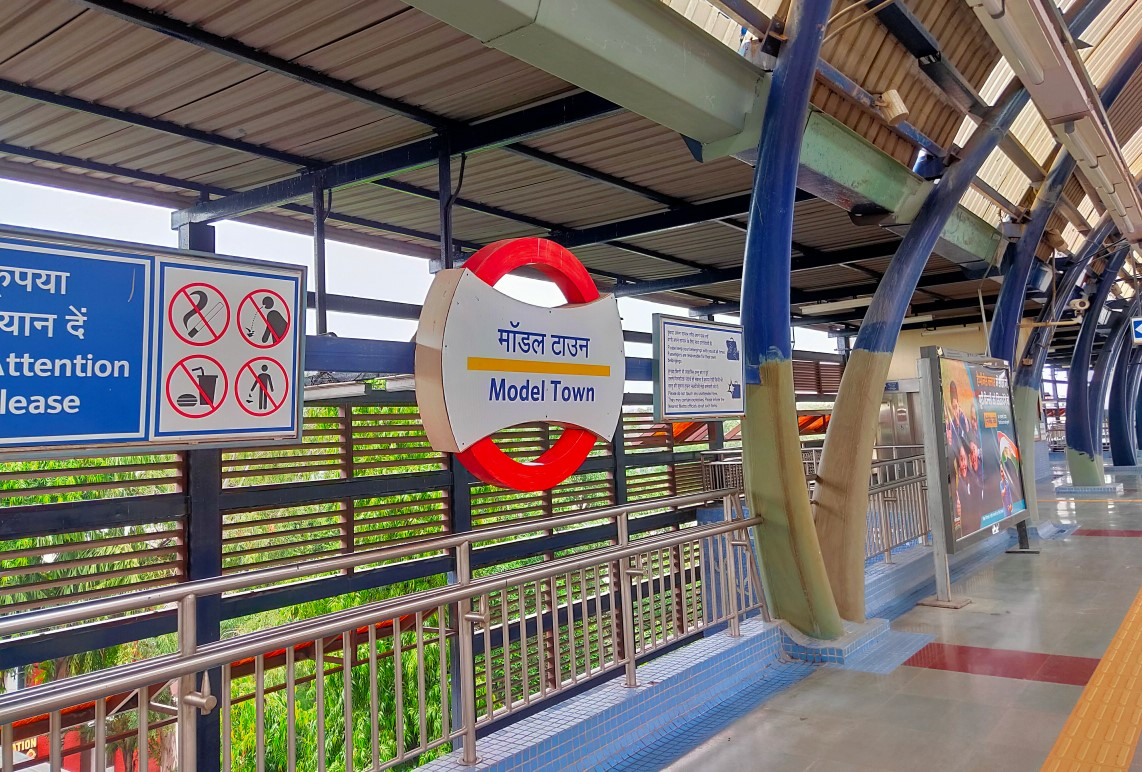
Model Town metro station

Model Town is well connected by the Ring Road, and there is now access to the Outer Ring Road as well. 2 Metro Stations (Model Town and Azad Pur) are within easy reach.

Model Town is relatively centrally located, not more than 8 km from the city centre. Nearby areas include Azadpur, Derawal Nagar, Mahendru Enclave, Civil Lines, Kingsway Camp, Kamla Nagar, DR. Mukherji Nagar, Shalimar Bagh, Timarpur, Hudson Lines, Gujranwala Town and the University of Delhi's north campus.

== Landmarks ==
Alpana Cinema (now closed) is situated near Model Town I Crossing which was not only one of the reputed Cinema Halls of Delhi but also a well-known landmark of the area. Chhatrasal Stadium is also situated opposite Model Town III in the area and was used for soccer matches during the Asian Games, held in Delhi, India in the 80s. Model Town is connected by the Delhi Metro on the Vishwavidyalaya route and has one stop Model Town metro station.

Its actual postal address is only Model Town 110009, however as it has 3 bus stops on the main road people use too often refer to the location of the stop as a reference landmark (e.g. near Model Town 1st stop) which is now often referred as Model Town 1 or 2 or 3.

Model Town 1 has a lake called Naini Lake in the middle of the locality with a boating facility and has a walking path around the lake for morning and evening walkers. This lake is maintained by the Delhi Tourism.

The Grand Trunk Road (originally built under the reign of Sher Shah Suri) is close to Model Town, and the historic Gurdwara Nanak Piao is located on this road. This Gurdwara Sahib is dedicated to the first Sikh Guru, Sri Guru Nanak Dev. The word "Piao" means to "offer liquid to drink" and refers to the offering of water to all the thirsty who visited this shrine.

The foundation of the new capital of British India, New Delhi, was laid at the nearby Coronation Park by King George V in December, 1911, making this area historically significant.
