= Bareilly Cantt railway station =

Railway station in Uttar Pradesh

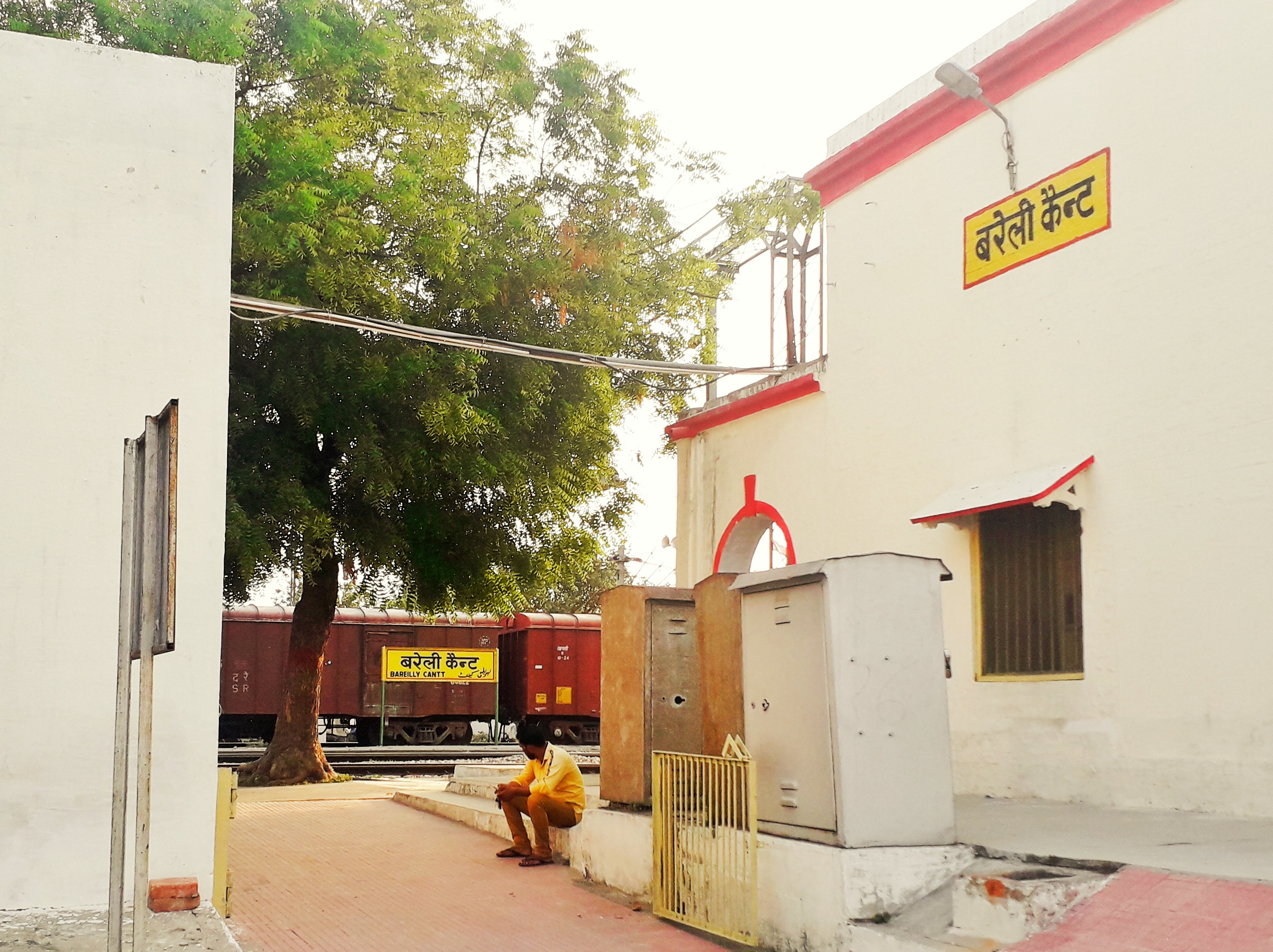
- Bareilly Cantt railway station

General information
- Location: Chanehti, Bareilly Cantt, Uttar Pradesh; India
- Coordinates: 28.3108585°N 79.4278031°E
- Elevation: 169 metres (554 ft)
- System: Indian Railways station
- Owner: Indian Railways
- Operator: Northern Railway
- Line: Lucknow–Moradabad line
- Platforms: 3
- Connections: Auto stand

Construction
- Structure type: Standard (on-ground station)
- Parking: No
- Cycle facilities: No

Other information
- Status: Functioning
- Station code: BRYC
- Zone(s): Northern Railway
- Division(s): Moradabad
Location
- Location within India Location within Uttar Pradesh

Bareilly Cantt railway station (station code: BRYC), previously known as Chanehti Railway station (station code: CHTI), is a railway station on the Lucknow–Moradabad line located in the city of Bareilly in Uttar Pradesh, India. It is under the administrative control of the Moradabad Division of the Northern Railway zone of the Indian Railways.

The station consists of three platforms, and is located in village Chanehti, near the southern fringes of Bareilly Cantt at a distance of 3 kilometres (1.9 mi) from Bareilly Junction and 5 kilometres (3.1 mi) from Bareilly city. It was previously known as Chanehti Railway station and was renamed as Bareilly Cantt railway station on 29 Sep 2016 following a decade long demand from a local group of Ex-servicemen. Three Passenger trains stop at the station.

== Gallery ==
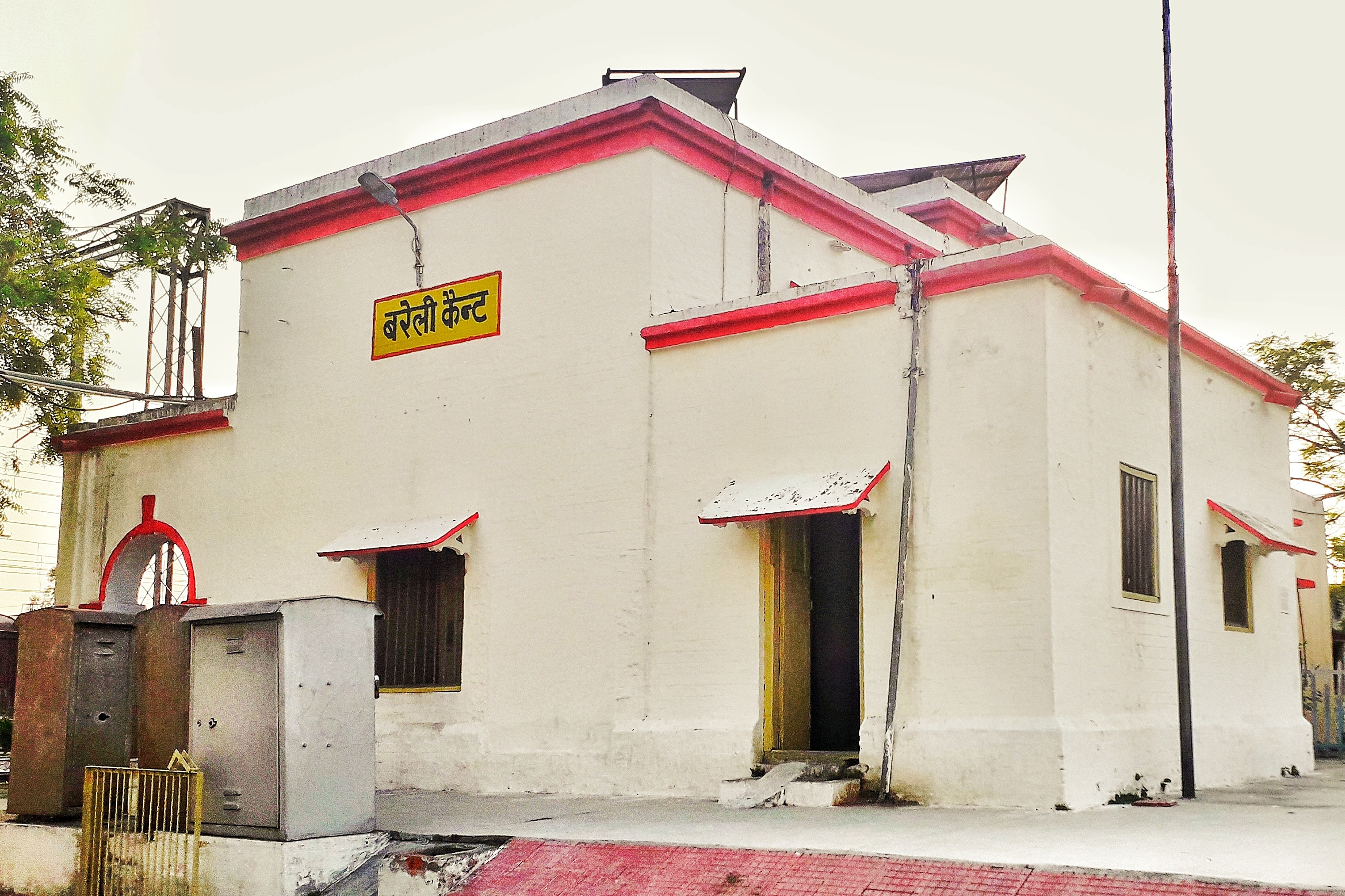

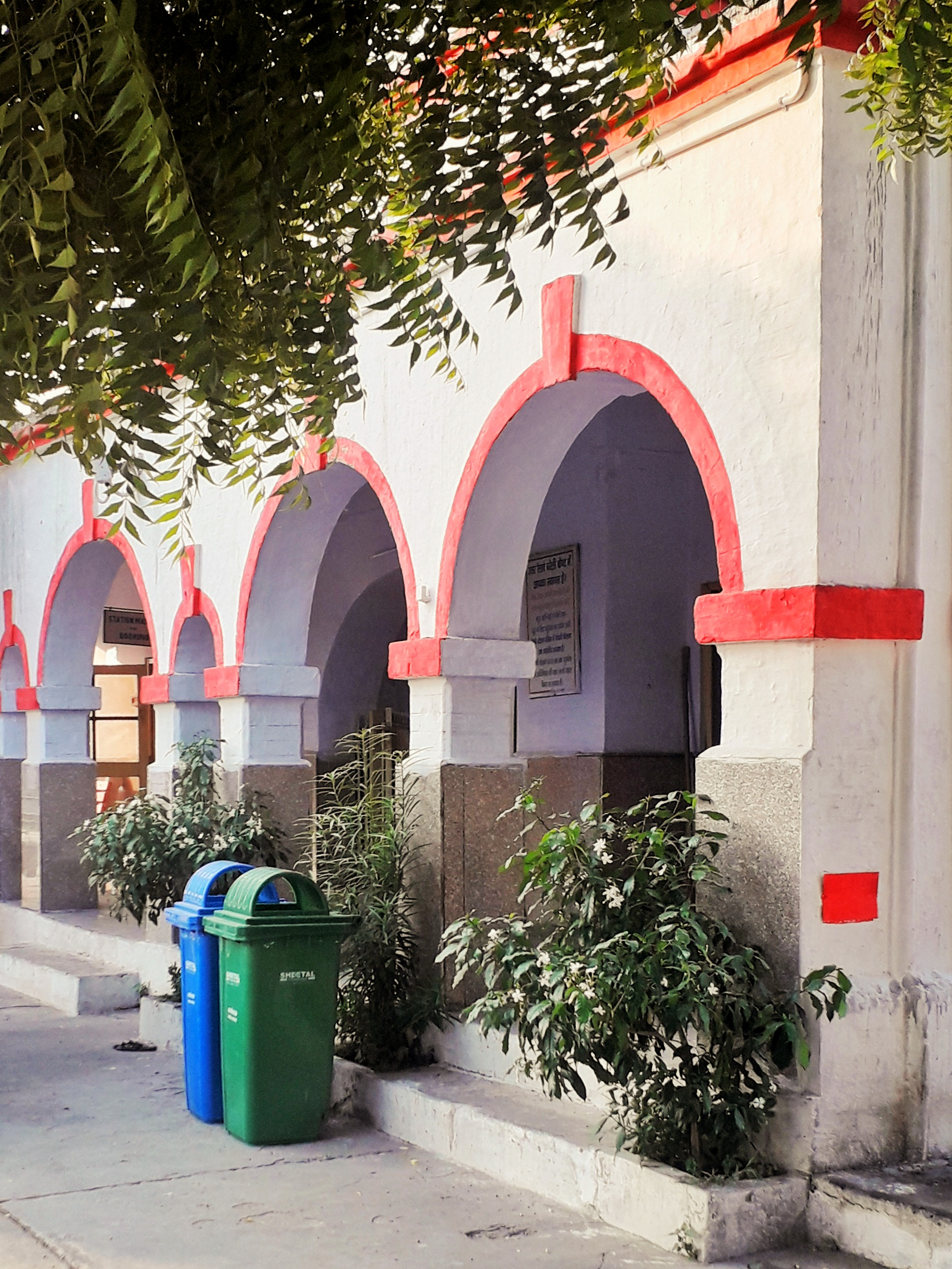

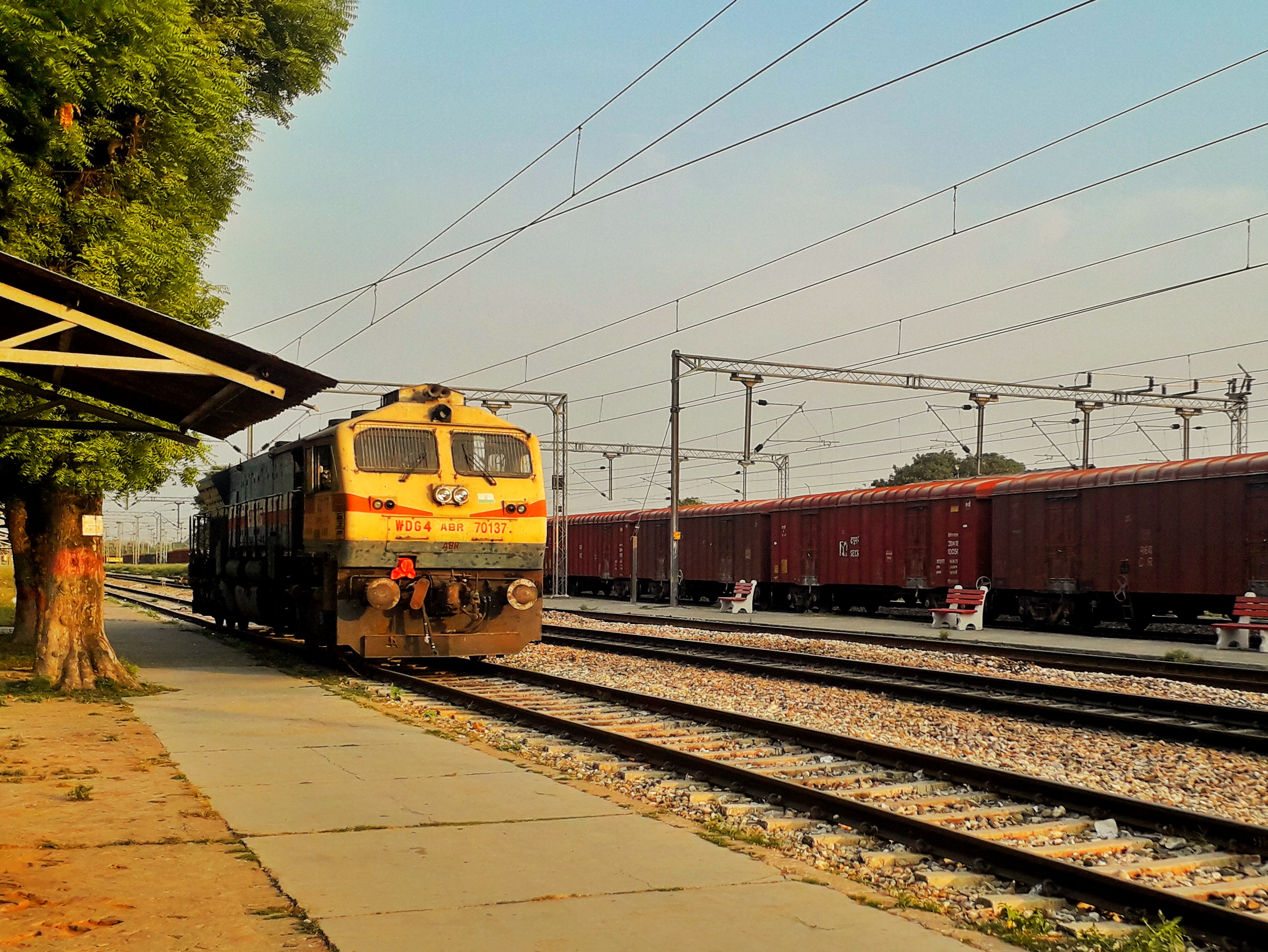
