= Sirohi House =

Coordinates: 28.683479°N 77.221940°E

Sirohi House is the former residence of the Maharao of Sirohi in Delhi. The house is located close to Civil Lines, Delhi.

The house is run today as a traveller inn and hotel.
