= Civil Lines, Delhi =

Civil Lines
- Neighborhood
- Location in Delhi, India
- Coordinates: 28.679368°N 77.226076°E
- Country: India
- State: Delhi
- District: North Delhi

Languages
  - Official: Hindi, English
- Time zone: UTC+5:30 (IST)
- PIN: 110 054
- Lok Sabha constituency: North Delhi
- Civic agency: Municipal Corporation of Delhi

The Civil Lines is a historical residential area and one of the three subdivisions of the North Delhi district in India. It is also one of the 12 zones under the Municipal Corporation of Delhi. During the colonial rule, it served as the hub for British colonial officials and senior administrators. The area was home to European-style hotels and residences until New Delhi was established in 1911.

== History ==
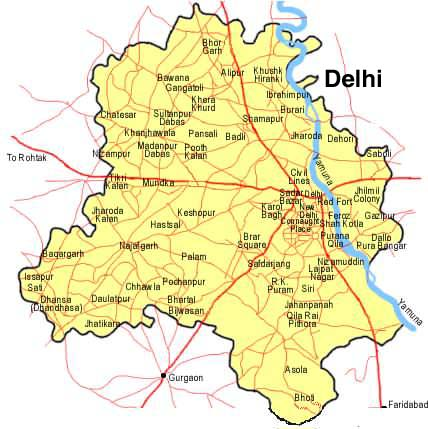
Map of Delhi denoting the location of Civil Lines

The name Civil Lines is a relic of the British Raj, when the city of Delhi was demarcated into distinct areas for the British military and civilian buildings and structures. The Civil Lines were designated for senior British civilian officers, while the military quarters were located in a separate area, reflecting the colonial administration's need for organised spaces for different functions.

The term Civil Lines refers to areas where civilians lived during the British Raj. One notable monument from this era is the Metcalfe House. This building was central to the administration and governance of the then-nascent imperial possessions of the British Empire in India, housing the offices of nineteen British Governor Generals (Viceroys) from Charles Hardinge to Lord Irwin, who governed from the Old Secretariat on Alipore Road. The residence of the Viceroys was located at a prestigious bungalow at 1 Alipore Road, which was vacated in 1930 to relocate the official residence to a palatial complex on Raisina Hill in Lutyens' Delhi, known as the Viceroy's House. The bungalow at 1 Alipore Road now houses Indraprastha College for Women, a constituent of the University of Delhi.

After 1931, the Old Secretariat served as the office for the British Indian Army, the Post Master General, and the adjoining Army Press. Following India's independence, it became the seat of Delhi's Metropolitan Council, and is now home to various Central Government offices, including the Publications Department, along with offices of the Government of Delhi. The Viceroy's House, now called the Rashtrapati Bhawan, became the official residence of India's presidents in the republican era. The offices of the Old Secretariat were relocated in 1931 to the New Secretariat Building near the Viceroy's House, which is now known as the Central Secretariat.

One of Delhi's earliest modern hotels, Maidens Hotel, was built in 1903 in the Civil Lines, an area known for its European-style hotels where British officers stayed. Other notable hotels in the area included Swiss Hotel and Hotel Cecil, operated by the Robert Hotz family, which also owned Wildflower Hall and the Cecil Hotel in Shimla. Hotel Cecil was eventually demolished, and St. Xavier's School now stands on its site.

Raj Niwas, the official residence of the Lieutenant Governor of Delhi, who serves as the constitutional head of the National Capital Territory of Delhi, is located at Raj Niwas Marg in Civil Lines. The official residence of the Chief Minister of Delhi, and other union territory government officials, are also located within Civil Lines. A children's home run by Mother Teresa's Missionaries of Charity lies north of the 18th century Mughal-era Qudsia Bagh in Civil Lines.

== Surrounding areas ==
- Delhi University, North Campus
- Mukherjee Nagar
- Kingsway Camp: the main street of G.T.B. Nagar
- Timarpur: residential bungalows and multi-story apartment blocks for employees of the Central Government and the Government of Delhi
- Radio Colony: a housing colony for employees of All India Radio
- Model Town: an affluent neighbourhood comprising a popular shopping district

== Transport ==
The Civil Lines station on the Yellow Line of the Delhi Metro network services the area. This residential locality is also conveniently close to the Kashmere Gate metro station, which functions as an interchange for three metro lines.

== See also ==
- Civil Lines, Allahabad
- Civil Lines (magazine)
- Civil Lines, Rawalpindi
- Civil Lines, Faisalabad
