= Bareilly Cantonment =

- Cantonment
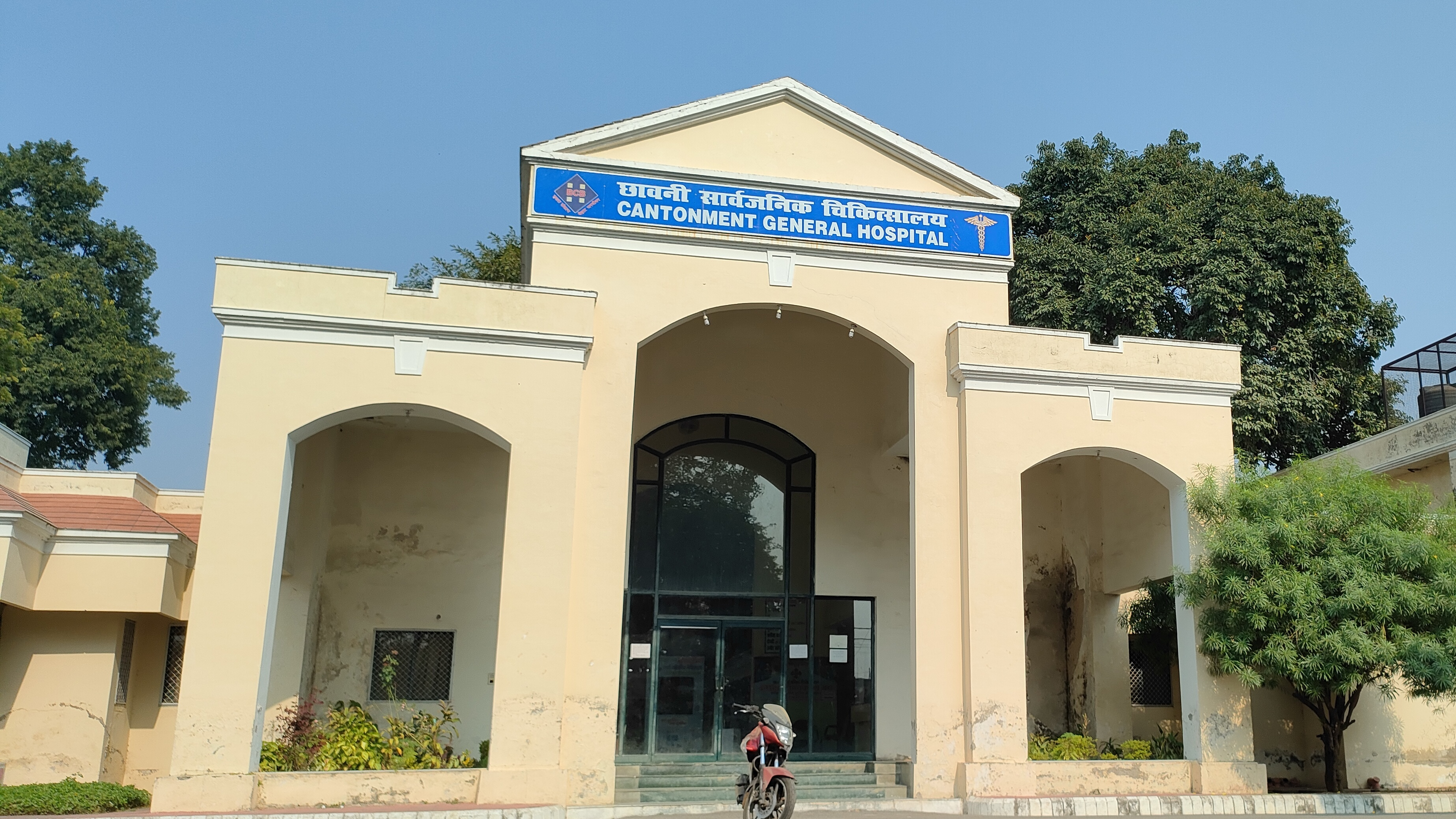
- Cantonment General Hospital, Bareilly Cantt

- Location in Uttar Pradesh, India
- Coordinates: 28.364°N 79.415°E
- Country: India
- State: Uttar Pradesh
- District: Bareilly district
- Established: 1811
- Founder: British Indian Army

Government
  - Type: Municipal
  - Body: Indian Army

Area
  - Total: 17.12 km^{2} (6.61 sq mi)

Population (2011)
  - Total: 30,003
  - Density: 1,753/km^{2} (4,539/sq mi)

Languages
  - Official: Hindi, Urdu
- Time zone: UTC+5:30 (IST)
- Vehicle registration: UP 25
- Website: bareilly.cantt.gov.in

Bareilly Cantonment is a cantonment town located in the Bareilly district of the north Indian state of Uttar Pradesh.

== History ==
The city of Bareilly, along with the entire Rohilkhand region, came under the suzerainty of the British East India Company in 1801. The Bareilly Cantonment was established by the company in 1811, when a small fort was constructed to the south of the city, and a few years later, the cantonment area contained much more buildings than in the entire city.

The city of Bareilly played a major role in the Indian Rebellion of 1857, and as a result, the cantonment saw major damages. When Bareilly was recaptured by the British in 1858, regular British troops were deployed in the cantonment area. The cantonment at that time used to be mainly divided into three parts; The Indian Infantry lines were in the eastern part, British Infantry lines and an Indian battalion were in the middle part, while the Artillery lines were stationed in the western part of the cantonment.

== Geography ==
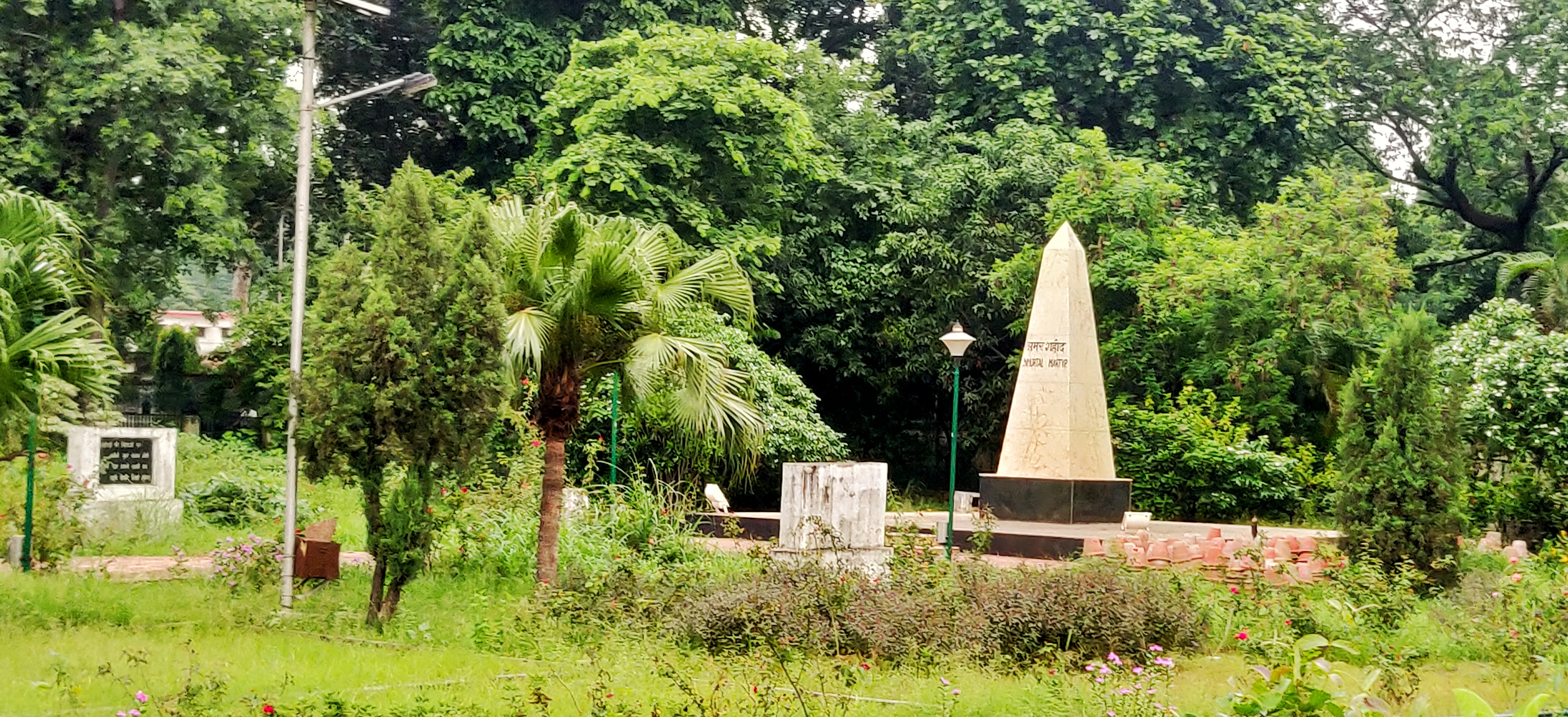
Phool Bagh, Bareilly Cantt

The Bareilly Cantonment is spread over an area of 17.12 square kilometres (6.61 mi^{2}). It is surrounded on all sides by Bareilly city and is located to the south of the city centre. The neighbourhood of Civil Lines lies to its north, Kandherpur, Chanehti and Thiriya Nizamat Khan to its south and Nakatiya and Bhartaul lie to its east while a Railway Line separates it from the neighborhood of Subhash Nagar on the west. Several green areas are located in the Cantonment including the Phool Bagh Garden and The Army Ecological Park & Training Area (AEPTA), which also houses a Golf course.

== Demographics ==
Historical population
Year	Pop.	±%
1931	9,852	—
1941	12,162	+23.4%
1951	13,404	+10.2%
1961	13,205	−1.5%
1971	18,270	+38.4%
1981	25,957	+42.1%
1991	26,689	+2.8%
2001	28,038	+5.1%
2011	30,003	+7.0%
Source: District Census Handbook Bareilly

As of 2011 India census, Bareilly Cantonment had a population of 30,003. Males constitute 59.1% of the population and females 40.9%. Bareilly Cantonment has an average literacy rate of 87.91%, higher than the national average of 59.5%; with 92.54% of the males and 81.09% of females literate. 10.45% of the population is under 6 years of age.

== Major Units / Formations ==
- Jat Regimental Centre (JRC)
- Headquarters Uttar Bharat Area
- Headquarters 6 Mountain Division
- Junior Leaders Academy (JLA)

== Transport ==
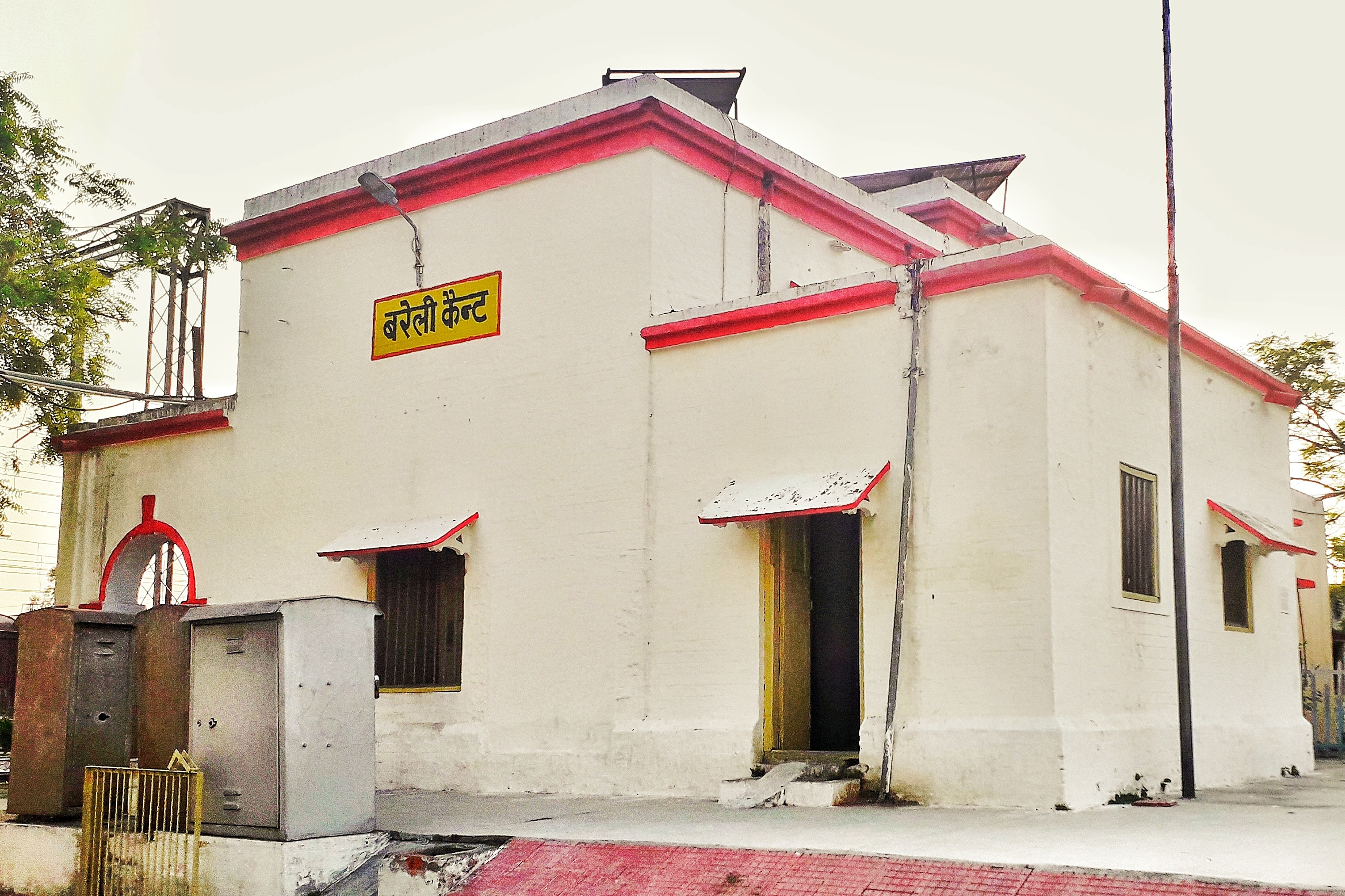
Bareilly Cantt railway station

The Bareilly Cantonment is located at a distance of 250 kilometres (160 mi) from Delhi and Lucknow, 220 kilometres (140 mi) from Agra and 145 kilometres (90 mi) from Nainital. The Bareilly Junction railway station (station code: BE) is located near the western limits of the Cantonment, while the Chanehti Railway Station (station code: CHTI) is located to its south. The Cantonment sometimes lends its name to the Chanehti station, which is also called the Bareilly Cantt Station. The Bareilly Satellite bus station is located near the eastern limits of the Cantonment.
