= Papin Dam =

- Country: Pakistan
- Location: Chak Beli Khan, Rawalpindi District, Punjab
- Status: underconstruction
- Construction began: July, 2009
- Opening date: 2023
- Construction cost: Rs. 8,609 Million
- Operator: WAPDA

Dam and spillways
- Type of dam: Concrete Gravity

Papin Dam is a proposed dam located in Papin village of Chak Beli Khan in Rawalpindi District, Punjab, Pakistan. The dam is located on a tributary of Soan River.

It will help alleviate the problem of water scarcity in Chak Beli Khan and its surrounding areas.
