= Vidhan Sabha metro station =

Metro station in Delhi, India

Vidhan Sabha

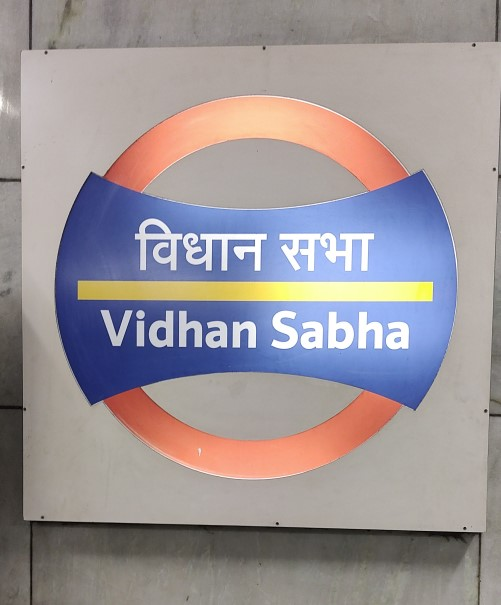

General information
- Location: Mahatma Gandhi Rd, Khyber Pass, Civil Lines, New Delhi, 110054
- Coordinates: 28°41′16″N 77°13′18″E
- System: Delhi Metro station
- Owner: Delhi Metro
- Line: Yellow Line
- Platforms: Side platform; Platform-1 → Millennium City Centre Gurugram; Platform-2 → Samaypur Badli
- Tracks: 2

Construction
- Structure type: Underground
- Platform levels: 2
- Accessible: Yes

Other information
- Station code: VS

History
- Opened: 20 December 2004; 21 years ago
- Electrified: 25 kV 50 Hz AC through overhead catenary

Passengers
- 2015: 171,181; 5522 Daily Average

Services
| Preceding station | Delhi Metro | Following station |
|---|---|---|
| Vishwavidyalaya towards Samaypur Badli | Yellow Line | Civil Lines towards Millennium City Centre Gurugram |
Route map
Location

The Vidhan Sabha metro station is located on the Yellow Line of the Delhi Metro. It services the area around Delhi Legislative Assembly (Vidhan Sabha), and Majnu Ka Tilla, which is 1.5 km away.

== Station layout ==
| G | Street Level | Exit/Entrance |
| L1 | Concourse | Fare control, station agent, Metro Card vending machines, crossover |
| L2 | Side platform | Doors will open on the left |
| L2 | Platform 1 Southbound | Towards → Millennium City Centre Gurugram; Next Station: Civil Lines |
| L2 | Platform 2 Northbound | Towards ← Samaypur Badli; Next Station: Vishwavidyalaya |
| L2 | Side platform | Doors will open on the left |
| L2 |

== See also ==
- List of Delhi Metro stations
- Transport in Delhi
- Delhi Metro Rail Corporation
- Delhi Suburban Railway
- Delhi Transport Corporation
- North Delhi
- National Capital Region (India)
- List of rapid transit systems
- List of metro systems
