= Kandherpur =

Coordinates: 28.30681°N 79.42117°E

Kandherpur is a village in Bareilly district in the state of Uttar Pradesh, India. This village is near Bisharatganj town.
