= Basharatganj railway station =

Railway station in Uttar Pradesh

- Indian Railways logo

General information
- Location: Bisharatganj, Bareilly, Uttar Pradesh; India
- Coordinates: 28.1539306°N 79.2240812°E
- Elevation: 167 metres (548 ft)
- System: Indian Railways station
- Owner: Indian Railways
- Operator: Northern Railway
- Line: Lucknow–Moradabad line
- Platforms: 1
- Connections: Auto stand

Construction
- Structure type: Standard (on-ground station)

Other information
- Station code: BTG
- Zone(s): Northern Railway
- Division(s): Moradabad
Location
- Location within Uttar Pradesh Location within India

Basharatganj railway station (station code: BTG) is a railway station on the Chandausi loop of the Lucknow–Moradabad line. It is located in the town of Bisharatganj in Bareilly, Uttar Pradesh, India. The station is under the administrative control of the Moradabad Division of the Northern Railway zone of the Indian Railways.

The station consists of one platform, and is located at a distance of 15 kilometres (9.3 mi) from Bareilly Junction. Six trains (Five Passenger / One Express) stop at the station.
