= Thiriya Nizamat Khan =

Thiriya Nizawat Khan Thiriya Nizawat Khan
- Town
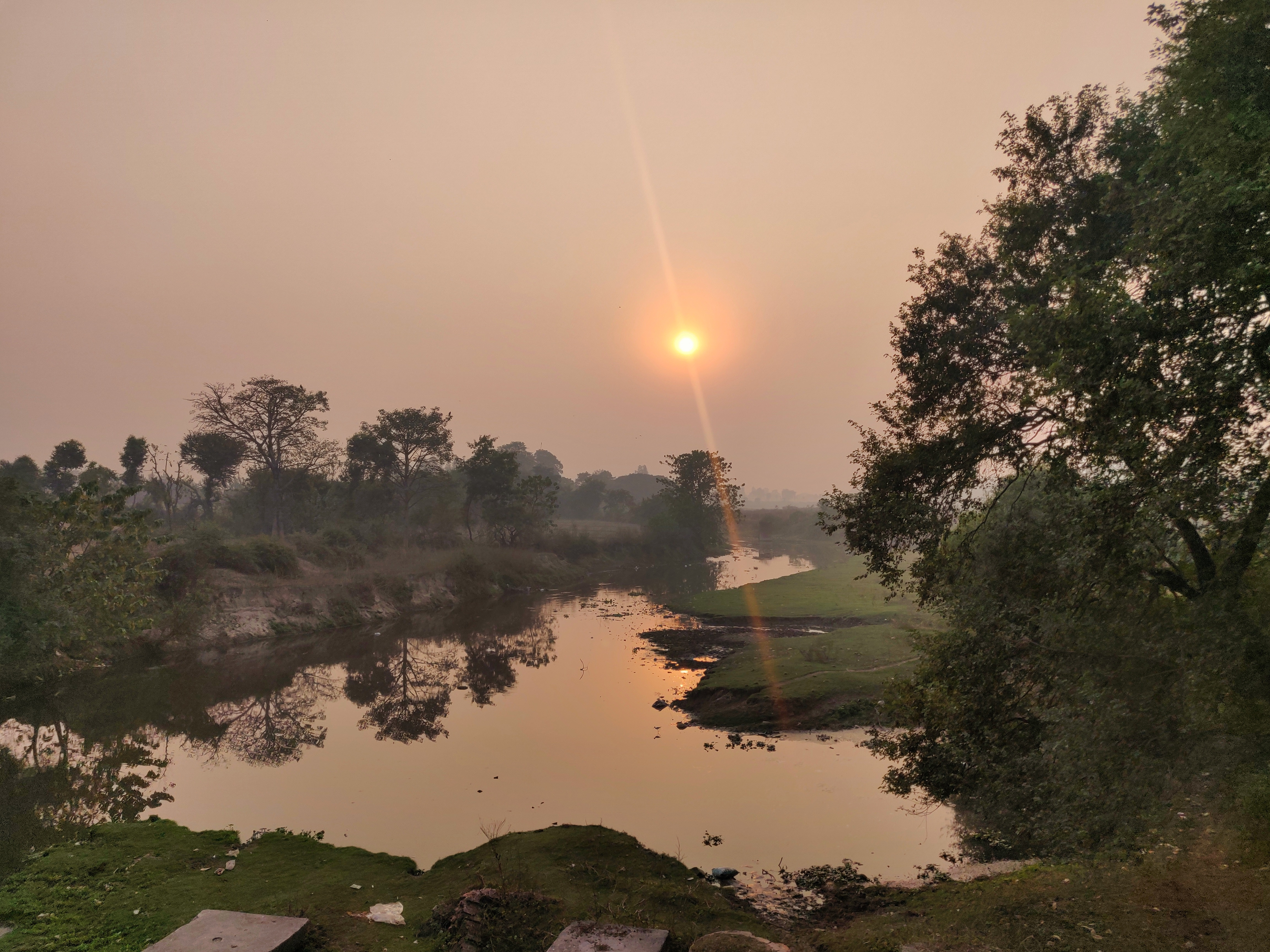
- Nakatiya river between Thiriya and Bareilly Cantt

- Location in Uttar Pradesh, India
- Coordinates: 28.315073°N 79.45771°E
- Country: India
- State: Uttar Pradesh
- District: Bareilly
- Elevation: 230 m (750 ft)

Population (2001)
  - Total: 23,184

Languages
  - Official: Hindi
- Time zone: UTC+5:30 (IST)
- Postal code: 243123

Thiriya Nizawat Khan is a town and a nagar panchayat in Bareilly district in the Indian state of Uttar Pradesh.

As of 2011 India census, Thiriya Nizamat Khan had a population of 23,184. Nowadays Thirya population approx 70000. Males constitute 51.65% of the population and females 48.34%. Thiriya Nizamat Khan has an average literacy rate of 43.68%, lower than the national average of 74.04%: male literacy is 49.38%, and female literacy is 37.58%. In Thiriya Nizamat Khan, 12.64% of the population is under 6 years of age.

The population of Thiriya Nizamat Khan is mainly Muslims that hailed from Rajput Muslim community. The people of Thiriya Nizamat Khan belong to Bhatner district, now Hanumangarh district of Rajasthan. Their close relatives are in Kakrala Badaun.

Current Chairperson is Imran Ali Khan.
