= Mohan Singh Oberoi =

Indian hotelier (1898-2002)

Rai Bahadur Mohan Singh Oberoi
- Born: 15 August 1898; Bhaun, Jhelum District, Punjab Province, British India (present-day Chakwal District, Punjab, Pakistan)
- Died: 3 May 2002 (aged 103); Delhi, India
- Education: Dayanand Anglo Vedic School, Rawalpindi
- Occupations: Businessman; Politician
- Known for: Founder of Oberoi Hotels & Resorts
- Spouse: Ishran Devi
- Children: 5, including Prithvi Raj Singh Oberoi
- Awards: Padma Bhushan

Member of Parliament, Rajya Sabha
- In office 1962–1978 and 1972–1978

Member of Parliament, Lok Sabha
- In office 1968–1971
- Preceded by: Basant Narain Singh
- Constituency: Hazaribagh

Personal details
- Party: Jharkhand Party

Rai Bahadur Mohan Singh Oberoi (15 August 1898 – 3 May 2002) was an Indian businessman and politician. Oberoi was the founder and chairman of Oberoi Hotels & Resorts, India's second-largest hotel company, with 31 hotels in India, Egypt, Indonesia, UAE, Mauritius and Saudi Arabia. Oberoi was also active in politics and was a member of both houses of the Parliament of India during his political career.

In his obituary, the Times of India said that he was acknowledged for putting the Indian hotel industry on the global map by successfully establishing hotel brands like Oberoi and Trident worldwide.

== Early life ==
Oberoi was born in a Punjabi Khatri Sikh family in Bhaun, a minor village of Jhelum District (now Chakwal District), Punjab, British India. When he was six months old, his father, a contractor in Peshawar, died, leaving his mother with few resources.

After attending schools in his village and nearby Rawalpindi, he passed the Intermediate College Examination in Lahore, but was unable to continue attending classes because of lack of finances. During his time studying in Lahore Law College, Oberoi lived with his uncle, a devout Sikh, who asked him to leave when Oberoi shaved hair on his chin. He later moved to Shimla.

== Career ==
=== Early career and struggle ===
In 1922, Oberoi got a job at The Cecil Hotel in Shimla. to escape from the epidemic of plague and as front desk clerk, at a salary of Rs.50 per month. He was a quick learner and took many additional responsibilities. The manager of The Cecil, Ernest Clarke and his wife Gertrude took a great liking to the honesty of a hardworking young Oberoi.

Clarke and his wife decided to hand over the responsibility of managing Hotel Carlton now renamed as Clarkes to Oberoi. It was here, at Clarkes Hotel, that he gained firsthand experience in all aspects of operating a hotel. During their six months absence, Oberoi doubled up the occupancy to eighty percent which gave them enough reason to offer the hotel on a decided amount to Oberoi as they wanted to return to England.

=== Business career ===
Early in his business career, Oberoi nearly faced financial ruin as he used his then-current properties as collateral to acquire The Grand Hotel's lease, in Kolkata, and later discovered the hotel had contaminated water issues. Later, Oberoi over time acquired shares of Associated Hotels of India (AHI), a group that owned variously hotels including the Cecil and Corstophans in Shimla, Maidens and The Imperial in Delhi, and other properties in Lahore, Murree, Rawalpindi, and Peshawar. In 1943, he managed to gain a controlling stake in AHI. However, Oberoi later lost control of The Imperial in a lease battle.

He managed to fund his acquisition of AHI and avoid financial ruin from his earlier The Grand Hotel acquisition through strategically offering the British quartermaster general, during World War II, affordable rates to accommodate troops passing through Calcutta on their way to the Burma front. The influx of troops brought substantial revenue. He would charge the British soldiers a double rate for the women they sneaked in.

After India became independent in 1947, Oberoi built additional hotels, while expanding his base holdings. In 1948, he established East India Hotels, now known as EIH. In April 1955, he was elected President of the Federation of Hotel and Restaurant Associations of India, and in 1960 was named President of Honour of the Federation for life. In 1965, in partnership with international hotel chains, he opened the Oberoi Intercontinental in Delhi. In 1973, Oberoi founded the Oberoi Sheraton in Mumbai.

=== Political career ===
He participated in legislative politics by winning elections to the Rajya Sabha for two terms, from April 1962 to March 1968 and from April 1972 to April 1978. He was elected to the fourth Lok Sabha in April 1968 as a candidate of the Jharkhand Party from the Hazaribagh Lok Sabha constituency, and remained a Member of Parliament, Lok Sabha till December 1972.

== Oberoi Group ==
The Oberoi Group, founded in 1934, employed about 12,000 people worldwide and owned and managed about thirty hotels and five luxury cruisers as of 2012. Oberoi Amarvilas, Agra, ranks amongst the top ten hotel spas Asia-Pacific, Africa, and the Middle East of the Travel + Leisure magazine, and ranked third in Best Hotels in Asia in 2007. Other activities include airline catering, management of restaurants and airport bars, travel and tour services, car rental, project management and corporate air charters. The Group has a number of hotels worldwide, latest hotel additions being in Singapore, Saudi Arabia, Sri Lanka, Nepal, Egypt and Africa.

Oberoi was the first to employ women in the hospitality sector. In 1966, he also established The Oberoi Centre for Learning and Development, which is now regarded as one of Asia's top institutions for hospitality education.

== Honours and awards ==
Throughout his later life Oberoi received numerous honours and awards from the Indian government and other organizations. Oberoi was presented with the title Rai Bahadur (pater familiae) by the British Raj government in 1943. He was awarded the Padma Bhushan, one of India's highest civilian awards, in 2001.

=== Centenarian ===
Almost all publications indicated Oberoi's year of birth as 1898 and his age at death as 103. In his own autobiographical sketch – How M S Oberoi became India's greatest hotelier, however, he gave 1900 as his official birth year, a fact attesting to his having lived to 101. However, The New York Times obituary, the date is given as 1898 and the following was written: "He was 103, although for years he said he was born in 1900 because he did not want to be seen as dating from the 19th century."

== Personal life and family ==
Oberoi married Ishran Devi in 1920, the daughter of Shri Ushnak Rai belonging to his village. They had two sons, Tilak Raj and Prithvi Raj Singh, and 3 daughters, Swaraj, Rajrani and Prem. Oberoi died on 3 May 2002, at the age of 103. Tilak Raj died in 1984 and Prithvi Raj Singh succeeded Oberoi as the Chairman of EHI in 2002 after Oberoi died.

Oberoi's nephew Brij Raj Oberoi, nicknamed "Diamond Oberoi" by Oberoi, also ventured into the hospitality industry, operating several Heritage hotels in the Himalayas.
