= Chak Beli Khan =

Union Council and Town in Rawalpindi, Punjab Pakistan

Chak Beli Khan چک بیلی خان
- Union Council and Town
- Location within Punjab, Pakistan Location within Pakistan
- Coordinates: 33.23601°N 72.9121°E
- Country: Pakistan
- Tehsil: Rawalpindi
- District: Rawalpindi
- Province: (Punjab, Pakistan) Punjab
- Union Council: No. 100 (Rawalpindi)

Government
  - Type: Union Council
- Elevation: 482 m (1,581 ft)

Population (2017)
  - Town (Chak Beli Khan): 7,431
  - UC Chak Beli Khan: 25,067

Society
  - Languages: Punjabi, Pothwari, Urdu, Pashto (rarely)
- Time zone: UTC+5 (PST)
- Postal Code: 47600
- Calling code: 051

Chak Beli Khan (Urdu: چک بیلی خان) is a town and union council of Rawalpindi District, Punjab, Pakistan central to a large population. It is located in the Pothohar Plateau near the Soan River and the Jabba river. It has a large marketplace. It is one of the large towns in Rawalpindi District.

Chak Beli Khan is the commercial hub of all the surrounding areas which includes more than 110 villages. Chak Beli Khan is business center of area belongs to PP10 (Rawalpindi), as well as the largest area in terms of population as per the 2017 census. It contains all the basic necessities of life.

== Location and geography ==
Chak Beli Khan is located in the Pothohar Plateau near the Soan River.

Distance from nearby places
Order	Name	Distance(KM)	Road name	Travel Time
1	Rawalpindi	49	Adyala Road	1 hr 19 min
2	Rawalpindi	56	Chak Beli Rawat Road	1 hr 10 min
3	Islamabad	76	Chak Beli Rawat Road	1 hr 23 min
4	Chakwal	43	Chakwal Road	48 min
5	New Islamabad International Airport	65	Motorway(Chakri Interchange)	1 hr 7 min

== Education ==
There are a number of government educational institutions being developed in the town, such as

- Govt. Elementary School Chak Beli Khan for boys.
- Govt. High School Chak Beli Khan for boys.
- Govt. Degree College Chak Beli Khan for boys.
- Govt. Girls Primary School Chak Beli Khan for girls.
- Govt. Elementary School Chak Beli Khan for girls.
- Govt. Girls Higher Secondary School Chak Beli Khan.
- Govt. Associate Degree College Chak Beli Khan for girls.

Some private English Medium schools are also there in the town. Students from nearby villages come and study in these schools.

== Health Facilities ==
Chak Beli Khan has one main Govt. Primary Healthcare Center. Private clinics and healthcare units are also working in the town. Lady health workers are also working with other Govt. Basic Health Units in the area.

=== Major projects related to health ===
- Jorian Hospital Chak Beli Khan: There was no major hospital in Chak Beli Khan for a long time but now a government hospital is being built in Jorian Chak Beli Khan which will have 100 beds. There is some work left in the building. Once the building is completed, its finishing work will begin.
- Shaykh-Ul-Alam Hospital Chak Beli Khan: private hospital where construction started on 7 January 2022.

== Telecommunication ==
The PTCL provides the main network of landline telephone. Many ISPs and all major mobile phone, Wireless companies operating in Pakistan provide service in Chak Beli Khan.

== Dams ==
There are two main proposed dams by Government of Punjab in Chak Beli Khan.

- Mahuta Chak Beli Dam (Under Construction)
- Papin Dam (Proposed)

== Oil and Gas Resources ==
Chak Beli Khan has oil and gas reserves. Oil and gas fields are drilled at Pindori Chak Beli Khan and a good amount of oil and gas is extracted, yet the people of Chak Beli Khan remained without gas for many years, but now gas was provided to the people of Chak Beli Khan.
