= The Postcard Hotel =

Indian luxury hotel chain

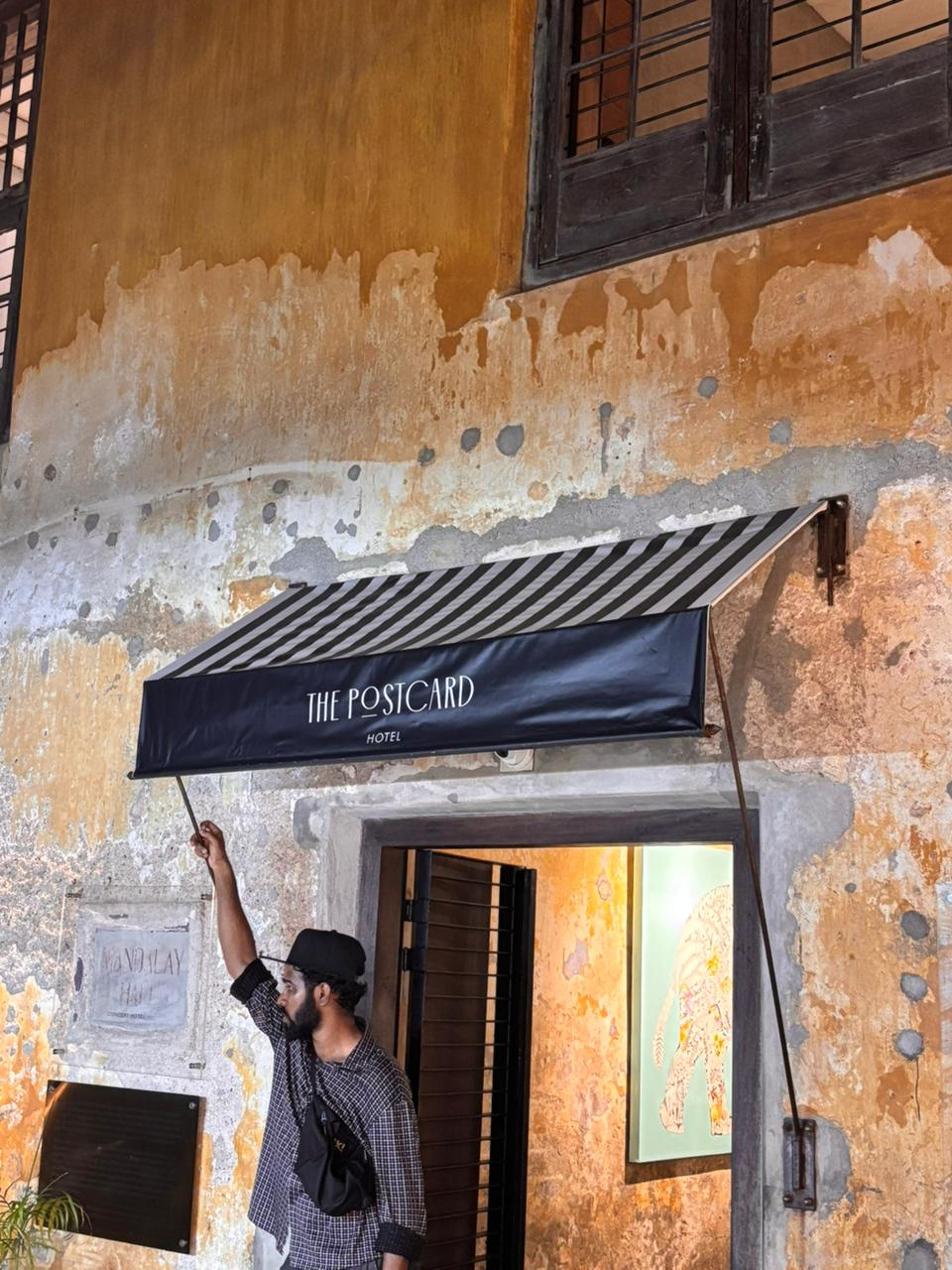
- Entrance of The Postcard Mandalay Hall in Kochi
- Industry: Hospitality
- Founded: 2018
- Founder: Kapil Chopra
- Area served: India; Sri Lanka; Bhutan
- Website: www.postcardresorts.com

Postcard Hotel and Resorts, also known as The Postcard Hotel, is an Indian chain of luxury hotels and resorts. It was launched by Kapil Chopra in 2018 with three hotels in Goa. Its hotels are known for their unconventional approach with relaxed check-in and check-out timings and lack of buffet spreads. In 2019, it opened a hotel each in Sri Lanka and Bhutan.

The chain was seed-funded by UAE-based investment group Small Ventures. It employs less than 300 employees across its nine properties. In 2022, a few of its hotels were felicitated at the World Travel Awards.

== See also ==
- Aman Resorts
- The Oberoi Group
