= Guru Tegh Bahadur Nagar metro station =

Metro station in Delhi, India

Guru Tegh Bahadur Nagar

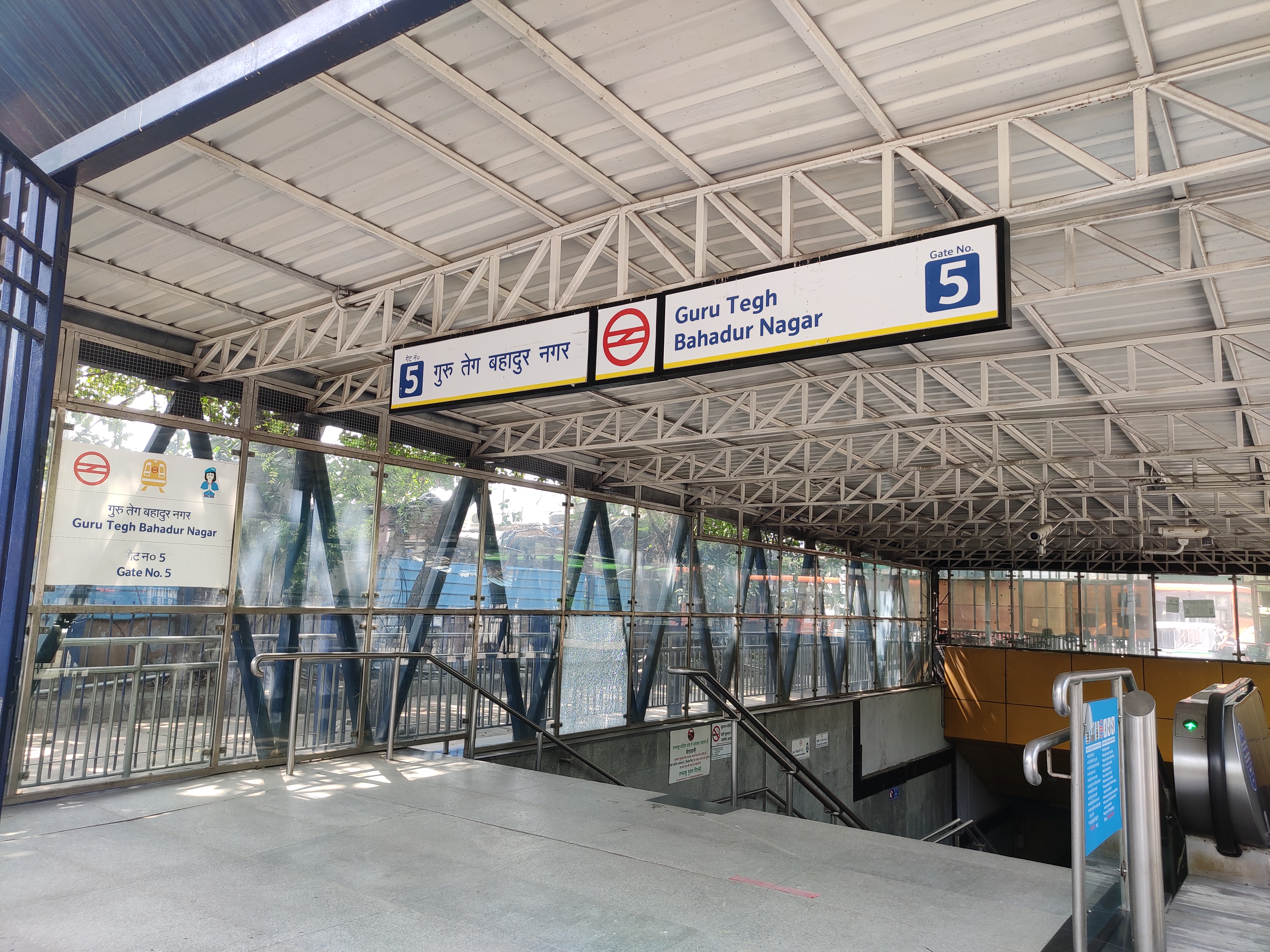

General information
- Location: 65, Ring Road, Guru Tegh Bahadur Nagar, North West Delhi, 110009; India
- Coordinates: 28°41′54″N 77°12′25″E
- System: Delhi Metro station
- Owner: Delhi Metro
- Line: Yellow Line
- Platforms: Side platform; Platform-1 → Millennium City Centre Gurugram; Platform-2 → Samaypur Badli
- Tracks: 2

Construction
- Structure type: Underground
- Platform levels: 2
- Parking: Available
- Accessible: Yes

Other information
- Station code: GTBR

History
- Opened: 4 February 2009; 17 years ago
- Electrified: 25 kV 50 Hz AC through overhead catenary

Passengers
- Jan 2015: 1,235,147; 39,843 Daily Average

Services
Preceding station	Delhi Metro	Following station
Model Town towards Samaypur Badli	Yellow Line	Vishwavidyalaya towards Millennium City Centre Gurugram
Route map
Location

Guru Tegh Bahadur Nagar (GTB Nagar) is a metro station located on the Yellow Line of the Delhi Metro.

The station serves the area of Guru Tegh Bahadur Nagar, Delhi (also known as Kingsway Camp) and other adjoining localities. It is the last underground station on the northern end of the Yellow Line.

Guru Tegh Bahadur Nagar was earlier known by its abbreviated name, GTB Nagar, until June 2019, when it was renamed to its current full name.

== Station layout ==
G	Street Level	Exit/Entrance
L1	Concourse	Fare control, station agent, Metro Card vending machines, crossover
L2	Side platform | Doors will open on the left
L2	Platform 1 Southbound	Towards → Millennium City Centre Gurugram; Next Station: Vishwavidyalaya
L2	Platform 2 Northbound	Towards ← Samaypur Badli; Next Station: Model Town
L2	Side platform | Doors will open on the left
L2

== Entry/exit ==
Guru Tegh Bahadur Nagar metro station entry/exits
Gate No-1	Gate No-2	Gate No-3	Gate No-4	Gate No-5
Outram Lines	Batra Cinema	Hudson Lane	Kingsway Camp Chowk	New Police Line

== See also ==
- List of Delhi Metro stations
- Transport in Delhi
- Delhi Metro Rail Corporation
- Delhi Suburban Railway
- Delhi Transport Corporation
- North Delhi
- National Capital Region (India)
- List of rapid transit systems
- List of metro systems
