= Vishwavidyalaya metro station (Delhi) =

Metro station in Delhi, India

Vishwavidyalaya

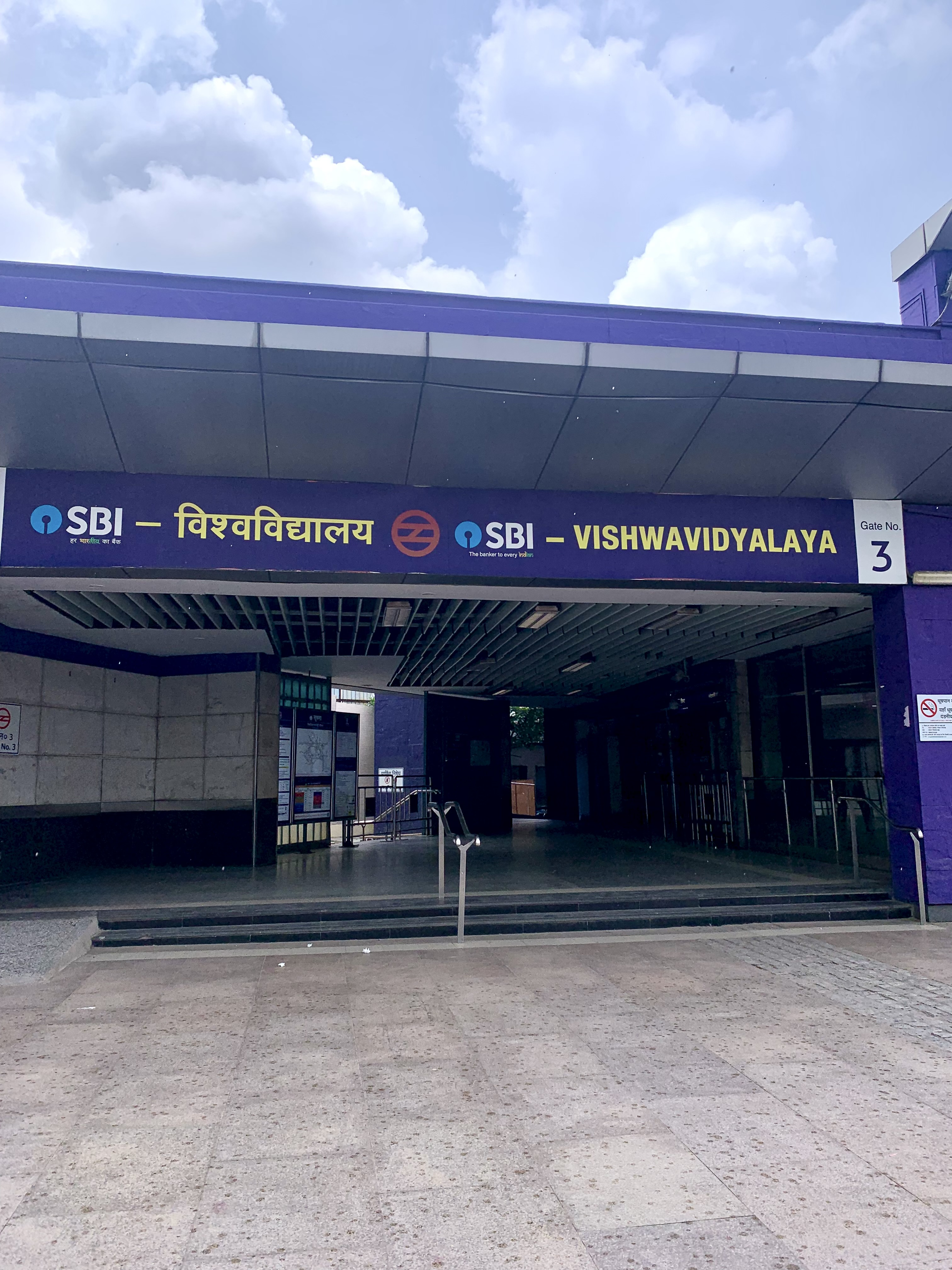
- Gate 3 of Vishwavidyalaya metro station

General information
- Location: The Mall Rd, New Delhi, 110007; India
- Coordinates: 28°41′41″N 77°12′53″E
- System: Delhi Metro station
- Owner: Delhi Metro
- Line: Yellow Line
- Platforms: Side platform; Platform-1 → Millennium City Centre Gurugram; Platform-2 → Samaypur Badli
- Tracks: 2

Construction
- Structure type: Underground
- Platform levels: 2
- Parking: Available
- Accessible: Yes

Other information
- Station code: VW

History
- Opened: 20 December 2004; 21 years ago
- Electrified: 25 kV 50 Hz AC through overhead catenary

Passengers
- 2015: 757,865; 24,447 Daily Average

Services
Preceding station	Delhi Metro	Following station
Guru Tegh Bahadur Nagar towards Samaypur Badli	Yellow Line	Vidhan Sabha towards Millennium City Centre Gurugram
Route map
Location

Vishwavidyalaya is a metro station located on the Yellow Line of the Delhi Metro. The station serves the North Campus of the University of Delhi and the Delhi University Stadium. Besides Samaypur Badli, it is also the alternate northern terminus for the Yellow Line along with Kashmere Gate, and is connected to the at-grade Khyber Pass Depot.

== Station layout ==
G	Street Level	Exit/Entrance
L1	Concourse	Fare control, station agent, Metro Card vending machines, crossover
L2	Side platform | Doors will open on the left
L2	Platform 1 Southbound	Towards → Millennium City Centre Gurugram; Next Station: Vidhan Sabha
L2	Platform 2 Northbound	Towards ← Samaypur Badli; Next Station: Guru Tegh Bahadur Nagar
L2	Side platform | Doors will open on the left
L2

== Entry/exit ==
Vishwavidyalaya metro station entry/exits
Gate No-1	Gate No-2	Gate No-3	Gate No-4
Riviera Apartments	Mall Road	Cavalry Lane	Chhatra Marg, University Campus, Khalsa College

== See also ==
- List of Delhi Metro stations
- Transport in Delhi
- Delhi Metro Rail Corporation
- Delhi Suburban Railway
- Delhi Transport Corporation
- North Delhi
- National Capital Region (India)
- List of rapid transit systems
- List of metro systems
