= Gurdwara Nanak Piao =

Coordinates: 28.69°N 77.19°E

- Interactive map of the Gurdwara Nanak Piao area

General information
- Architectural style: Sikh architecture
- Location: 5-A, Bhama Shah Marg, near Nanak Piao Gurudwara, Daulat Ram Dharamvir Axles, Model Town, Model Town, Delhi, 110009, India

Gurdwara Nanak Piao is a historical Gurudwara located in North West Delhi in India. This gurdwara sahib is dedicated to the first Sikh Guru, Sri Guru Nanak Dev Ji.

== History ==
Gurdwara Nanak Piao was built at the site, in the garden where Guru Nanak Dev camped when he visited Delhi in 1505 during the reign of Sultan Sikandar Lodi. It is on Rana Pratap Road (also known as Grand Trunk Road or GT Road). It is said that people flocked to the revered prophet and offered him and Bhai Mardana precious gifts and offerings. Guru Nanak Dev Ji used to distribute all these offerings to the poor and needy. Besides this, he offered food and water to the hungry and thirsty, hence the shrine's name. The word "Piao" means to "offer liquid to drink" and refers to the offering of water to all the thirsty who visited this shrine.

Even today, the well used by Guru Nanak is preserved, and visitors can still see the site from which he served water at the shrine. Over time, Gurdwara Nanak Piao has come to be regarded as a sacred and historically significant place of worship.

Guru Nanak Dev is remembered as a proponent of peace, brotherhood, non-violence, and harmony. His teachings had a profound and uplifting impact on those who sought his spiritual guidance.The garden surrounding the Gurdwara became a place of pilgrimage for the people from all over Delhi. This is where they received the message of spiritual deliverance.

== History ==
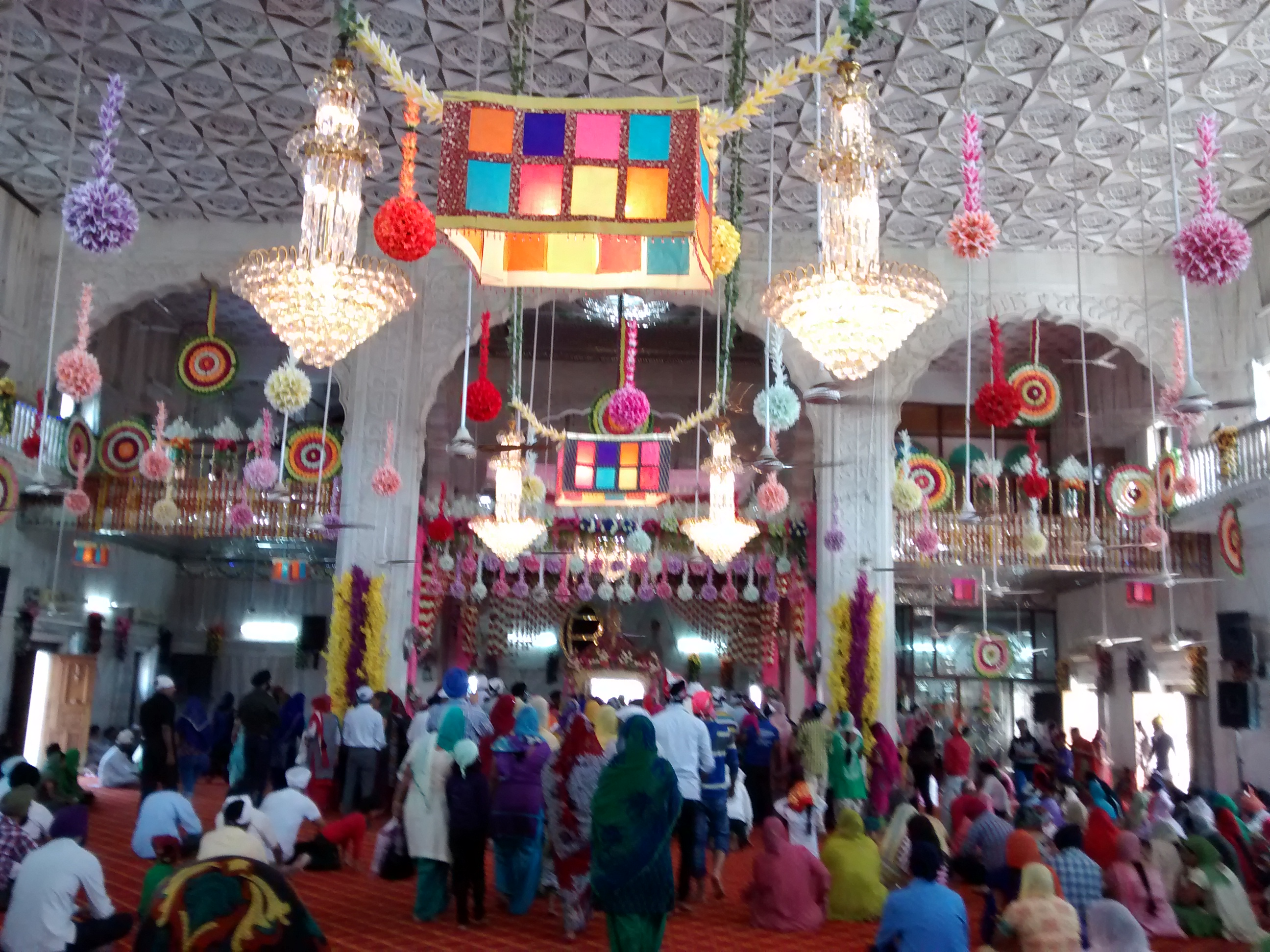
Main Hall of Gurudwara Nanak Piao Sahib decorated on the occasion of Guru Nanak Dev's Parkash Purab.

A story goes that during his stay in Delhi, rumors spread that Guru Nanak by the grace of God had revived a dead elephant. Emperor Sikander Shah Lodi learned of this holy man who had won the admiration of all the Hindu and Muslim divines of Delhi and had brought a dead elephant to life. It is said that when one of his favorite imperial elephants died, he sent for the Guru and requested him to revive his elephant too. But the Guru refused to oblige him. Consequently, the Guru was immediately imprisoned. In the prison, his deep compassion for the suffering of prisoners had a great moral and spiritual influence on the prison officials. They informed the Emperor that Guru Nanak was not an idolater and that as a saint he was greatly respected by all the people including Hindus and Muslims.

A strange thing happened during the imprisonment of Guru Nanak. A great earthquake shook the capital on 3 July 1505. According to a chronicler, "the mountains were overturned and lofty edifices were dashed to the ground. The living thought the day of judgment had come and for dead the day of resurrection". Many thought that the new Faqir Nanak who the Emperor had imprisoned had cursed the Emperor and the empire. This or some other equally strong influence like the intervention of the Chisti Sufi saints changed the mind of the Emperor and he ordered the release of Guru Nanak. At his request, many other prisoners were released with the Guru.
