= The Oberoi Group =

Indian luxury hotel group

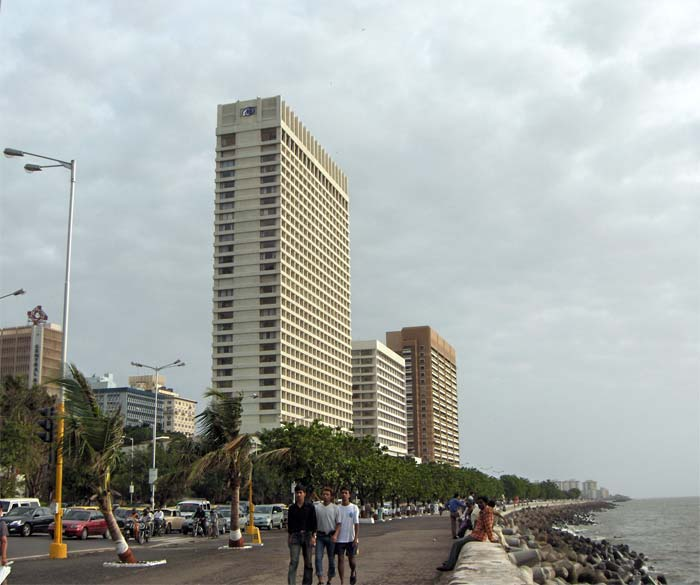
- An Oberoi Hotel in Mumbai
- Type: Private
- Industry: Hospitality industry
- Founded: 1934; 92 years ago
- Founder: Mohan Singh Oberoi
- Headquarters: New Delhi, India
- Number of locations: 32 (2017)
- Area served: Worldwide
- Key people: Arjun Singh Oberoi (Executive Chairman); Vikramjit Singh Oberoi (MD & CEO)
- Products: Hotels and resorts
- Owner: East India Hotels Limited (32.1%)
- Number of employees: 13,000 (2017)
- Website: www.oberoigroup.com

The Oberoi Group is a luxury hotel group with its head office in New Delhi, India. Founded in 1934, the company owns and operates 32 luxury hotels and two river cruise ships in 7 countries, primarily under its Oberoi Hotels & Resorts and Trident brands. The group also operates The Oberoi Centre of Learning and Development, which is regarded as one of Asia's top institutions for hospitality education.

== History ==
The foundations of The Oberoi Group date back to 1934 when Rai Bahadur Mohan Singh Oberoi, the founder of the group, bought two properties: the Maidens in Delhi and the Clarkes in Shimla.

In the following years Oberoi, assisted by his two sons, Tilak Raj Singh Oberoi and Prithvi Raj Singh Oberoi, continued the expansion of their group with properties both in India and abroad.

== Ownership ==
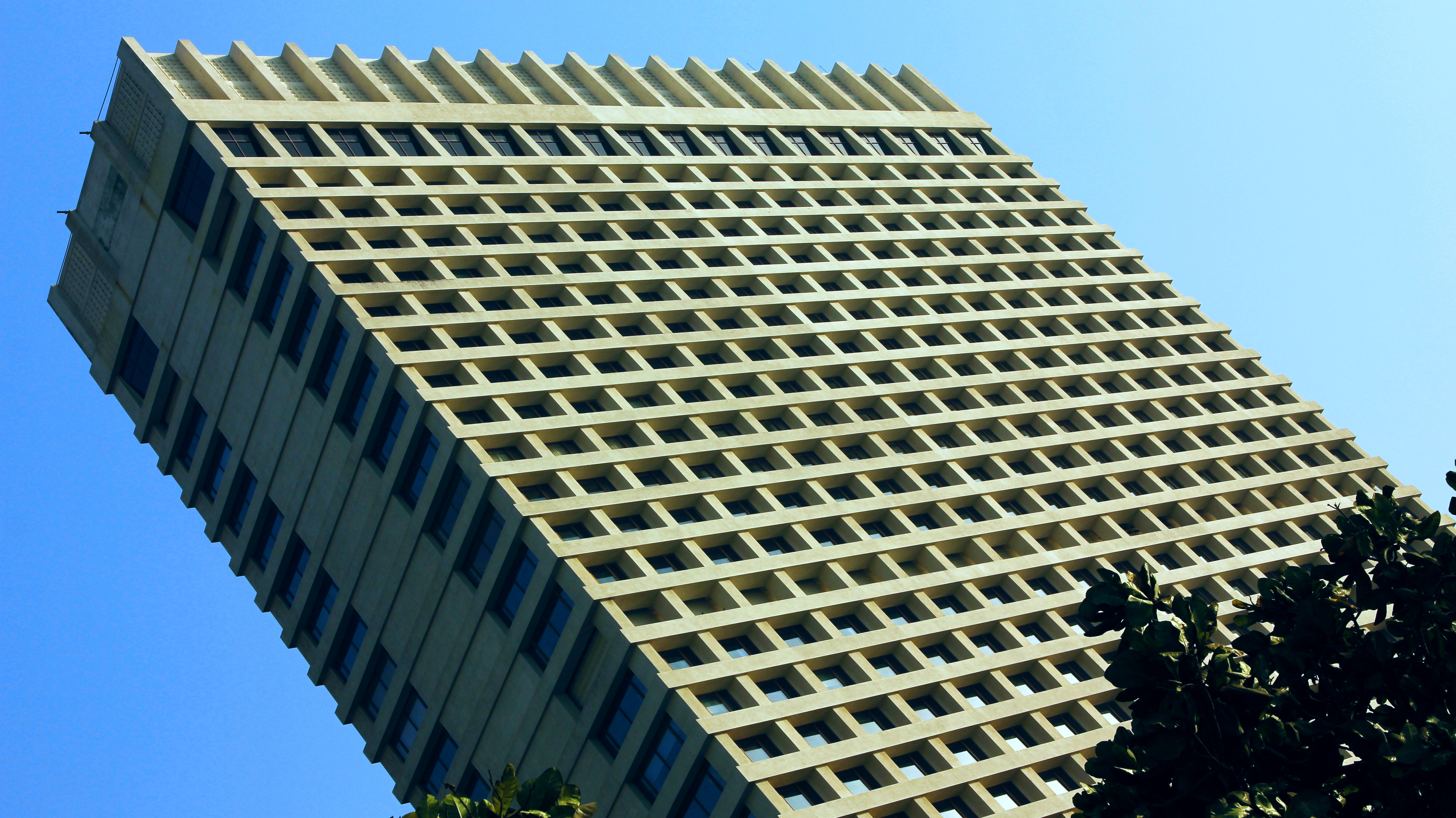
Trident, Nariman Point, Mumbai

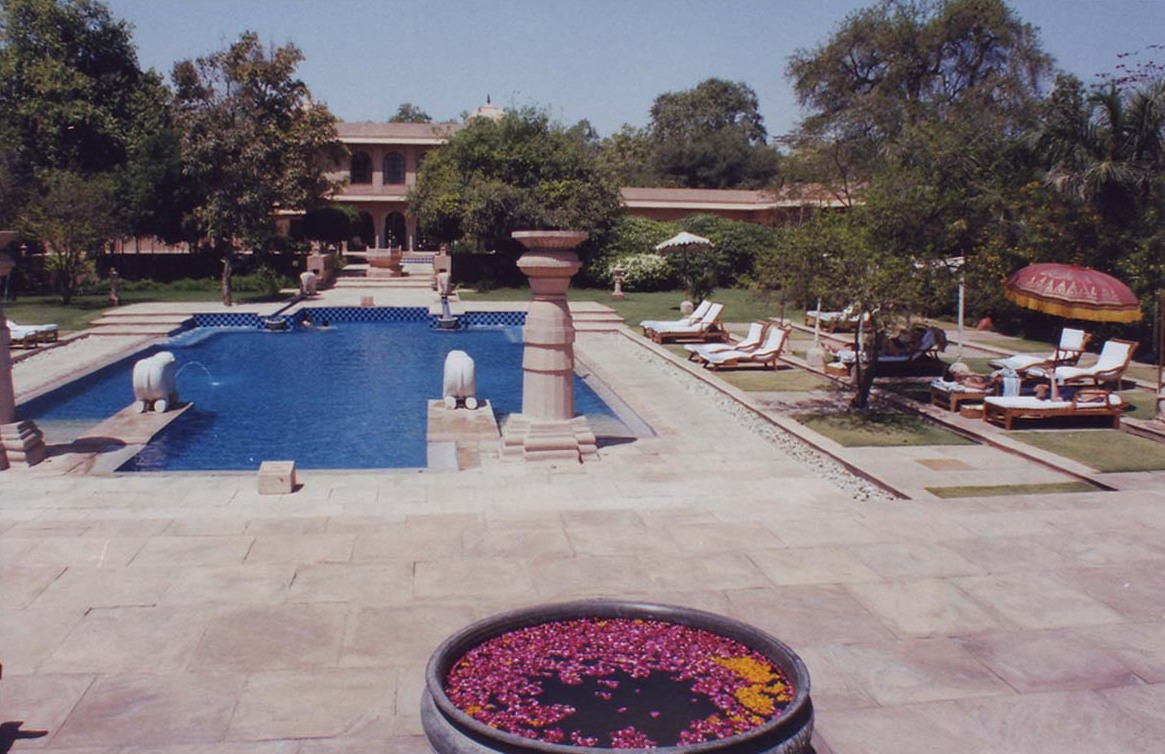
Oberoi Rajvilas, Jaipur

The two major holding companies of The Oberoi Group are EIH Ltd and EIH Associated Hotels (formerly East India Hotels). Arjun Singh Oberoi is the current chairman of The Oberoi Group and Vikramjit Singh Oberoi the managing director and CEO.

The Oberoi family is the majority shareholder in EIH Ltd with a 32.11% stake. Conglomerate ITC Limited owns approximately a 14.98% stake in EIH Ltd. To ward off pressures from ITC Ltd. whose ownership stands precariously close to the automatic open offer trigger at 15%, the Oberoi family divested a 14.12% stake in EIH Ltd. to Mukesh Ambani-led Reliance Industries Investment and Holding Pvt Ltd. The stake sale happened on 30 August 2010 for ₹10.21 billion (equivalent to ₹25 billion or US$260 million in 2026) valuing EIH Ltd. at an enterprise value of ₹72 billion (equivalent to ₹180 billion or US$1.8 billion in 2026). Recently the stake of Reliance further raised from ITC and it stood at 20% overall for Reliance Industries.

== Properties ==
The company currently manages 32 hotels under the luxury brand Oberoi Hotels & Resorts, with a further 10 five-star properties under the Trident Hotels brand. The group also operates the Clarkes Hotel in Shimla and the Maidens Hotel, Delhi. However, these two properties are not held under the Trident or under the Oberoi brand. The Clarkes Hotel, after remaining temporarily shut following its lawns caving in because of construction in the eco-sensitive vicinity, reopened on 16 September 2012.

== See also ==
- Taj Hotels
- The Postcard Hotel
