= Civil Lines, Bareilly =

Civil Lines
- Neighbourhood
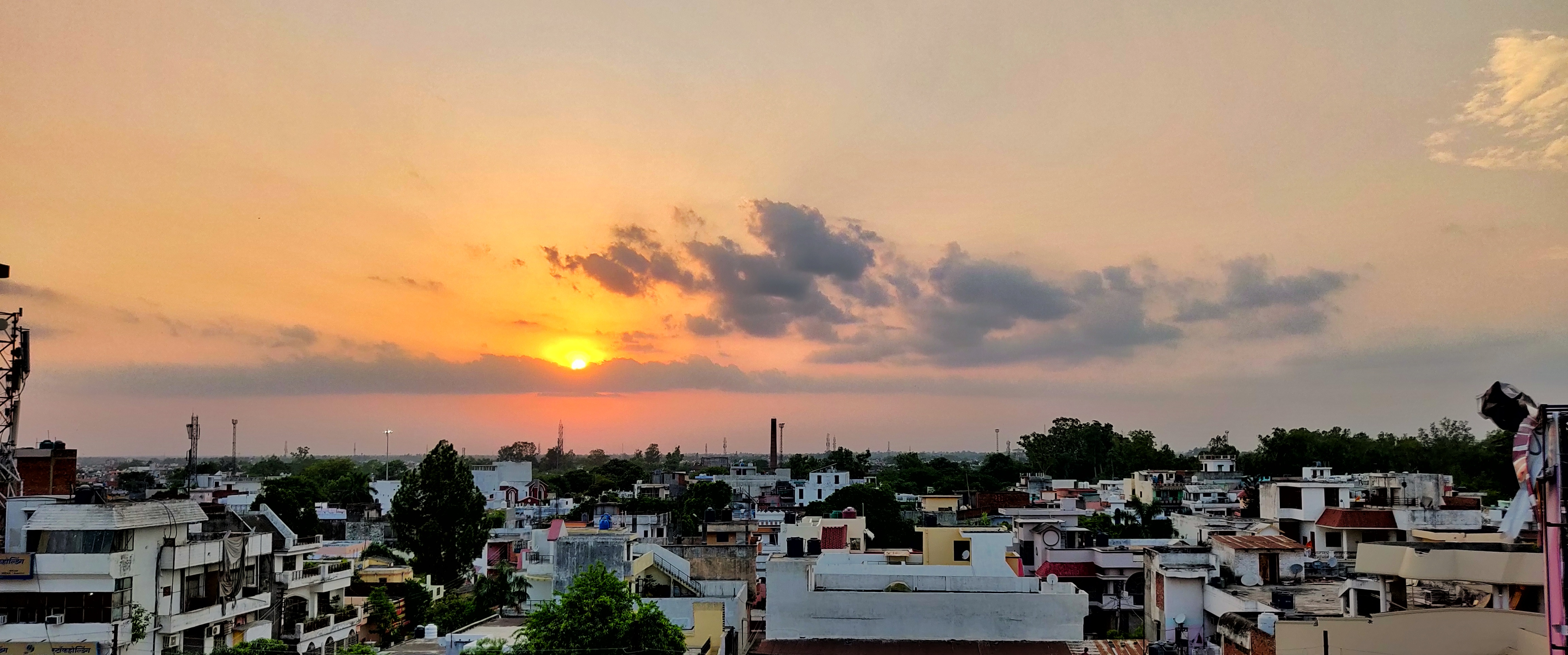
- Skyline of Civil Lines, Bareilly

- Location in Uttar Pradesh, India
- Coordinates: 28.339817°N 79.422483°E
- Country: India
- State: Uttar Pradesh
- District: Bareilly district, Uttar Pradesh
- Metro: Bareilly, Uttar Pradesh

Government
  - Body: Bareilly Municipal Corporation

Languages
  - Official: Hindi
- Time zone: UTC+5:30 (IST)
- Lok Sabha constituency: Bareilly (Lok Sabha constituency), Uttar Pradesh
- Vidhan Sabha constituency: Bareilly City, Bareilly division, Uttar Pradesh
- Civic agency: Bareilly Municipal Corporation

Civil Lines is a Civil Lines commercial street located near the town centre in Bareilly, Uttar Pradesh, India. It is located centrally in the city of Bareilly.

The name Civil Lines comes from the time of the British Raj, when the city of Delhi was organized into separate areas where the British Military and Civilian buildings were located. Areas where civilians lived were demarcated as Civil Lines. Later most of the prominent North Indian cities, including Bareilly, adopted this name for their commercial areas.

The civil lines of Bareilly was settled between the old city and the cantonment in the late nineteenth century; only British officers used to live in the area then. Apart from the cantonment, the police lines and the railway station were also located to the south of the civil lines, While the district prison was to its west and the circuit house was situated to its north-east, where several upper class bungalows were built. A few years later, the Company Garden (now Gandhi Udyan) was constructed towards its east.

After independence, the civil lines started expanding in the northeast direction, and it was at this time, that a residential colony named Rampur Garden started to settle on this side. Most of the government offices in Bareilly are located in the Civil Lines or Rampur Garden.
