= Civil Lines, Budaun =

Civil Lines
- Neighbourhood
- Interactive map of Civil Lines
- Coordinates: 28°1′52″N 79°7′56″E
- Country: India
- State: Uttar Pradesh
- District: Budaun
- City: Budaun

Government
  - Type: Mayor Council
  - Body: Municipal Corporation of Budaun

Population (2016 (estimated))
  - Total: 74,887

Languages
- Time zone: UTC+5:30 (IST)
- PIN: 243601
- Vehicle registration: UP 24

Civil Lines is a residential neighbourhood in Budaun, India. It is one of the various Civil Lines neighbourhoods developed by the British Raj for the senior officers in British India. The Budaun Club is also situated in this neighbourhood. Though a residential neighbourhood, commercial buildings can also be seen in the area. The area also has numerous schools, hospitals and shopping areas. The income tax department building is also located in the neighbourhood. It was founded in 1853 when Budaun city was made the headquarter of district replacing Sahaswan.

== Location ==
Its on the south side of the city, which was even the southern end of the city but now it has population covering it on every side. Old Bypass passes through Civil Lines, and State Highway 43 also passes through it. Railway Station and Old Bus stand is in Civil Lines only. The iconic Indra Chowk is also here. There are many colonies under Civil Lines, and other major landmarks too.
