= Rawalpindi Tehsil =

Administrative division in Rawalpindi District

Rawalpindi راولپنڈی
- Tehsil
- Country: Pakistan
- Province: Punjab
- District: Rawalpindi

Population (2023 Pakistani census)
  - Tehsil: 3,744,590
  - Urban: N/A
  - Rural: N/A
- Time zone: UTC+5 (PST)

Rawalpindi is a tehsil – an administrative subdivision – of Rawalpindi District in the western part of the Punjab province, Pakistan. It contains the district capital – the city of Rawalpindi.

Population of Rawalpindi Tehsil per 2023 Pakistani census is 3,744,590.

== History ==
=== Ancient history ===
Archaeological remains found on the site of the city of Rawalpindi date the establishment of settlements there to ancient times. There are ruins of a Buddhist settlement contemporary to the more celebrated ruins at nearby Taxila. It is widely believed that a Hun raid destroyed the first city. After the Battle of Balakot, the forces of Maharaja Ranjit Singh, mainly the Gheba tribe, settled in Attock and Rawalpindi.

=== Ghakkar rule ===
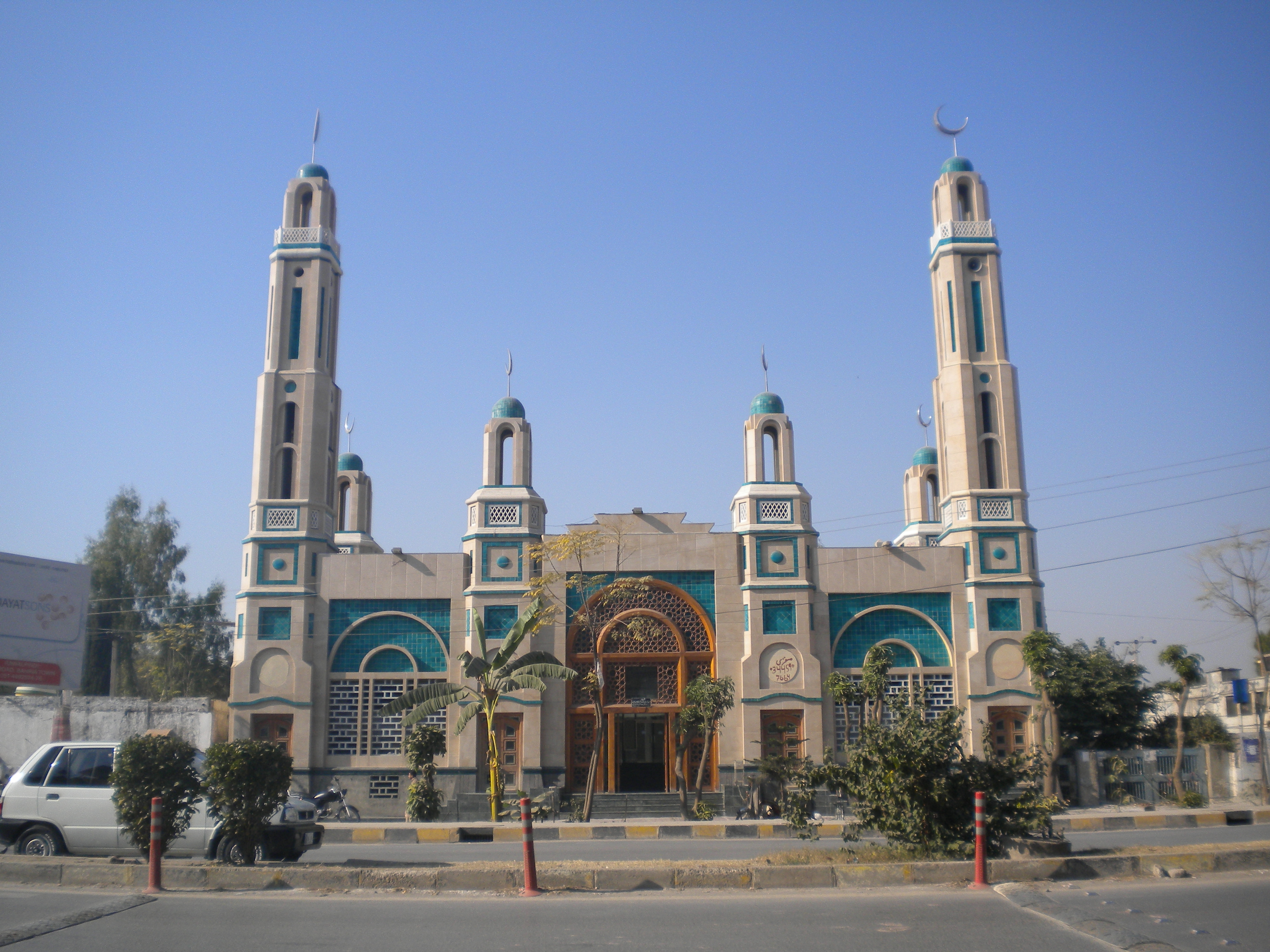

The Muslim ruler Mahmud of Ghazni (979-1030 AD) gifted the ruined city to a Ghakkar chief, Kai Gohar. Because it was vulnerable to invaders, the town remained deserted until another Ghakhar chief, Jahandad Khan, restored it and named it Rawalpindi (after the village Rawal).

=== Sikh rule ===
Rawalpindi remained under the rule of Ghakkars until Muqarrab Khan Gakhar, the last Ghakhar ruler, was defeated by Sikhs in 1765. Under Sikh rule, traders were invited to settle in Rawalpindi. A thriving trade was established, but during the nineteenth century, the Sikhs lost the city to the British, who established a cantonment south of the old city of Rawalpindi.

=== British rule ===
In 1879, the Punjab Northern Railway zone was extended to Rawalpindi. The train service was formally inaugurated on 1 January 1886. It housed the headquarters of Northern Command of the British Indian Army until 1947 and thereafter the headquarters of the Pakistan Army.

The tehsil was described in the Imperial Gazetteer of India as follows:

"North-western Tehsil of Rawalpindi District, Punjab, lying between 33°19' and 33°50' N. and 72°34' and 73°23' E., with an area of 764 square miles (1,980 km^{2}). The population in 1901 was 261,101, compared with 243,141 in 1891. The tahsil contains the town and cantonment of RAWALPINDI (population, 87,688), the headquarters; and 448 villages. The land revenue and cesses in 1903-4 amounted to 2.6 lakhs. MANIKIALA and SHAHDHERI are places of great archaeological interest. The Sohan river, which crosses the tahsil from east to west, divides it into two distinct portions. To the north lie the rich plains round Rawalpindi town, sloping up to the outlying spurs of the Himalayas, which form the northern boundary of the tahsil. To the south the country is cut up by torrent beds and ravines into little plateaux, which vary in soil and character, but resemble each other in difficulty of access".

Over the years, Rawalpindi has retained its traditional culture, though it has been extensively modernized since the creation of Pakistan in 1947. It is twinned with Islamabad, Pakistan's new capital.

== The old city and Rawalpindi bazaars ==
The bazaars of the old city are famous for quaint old shops in Saddar Bazaar, Moti Bazaar, Raja Bazaar and Kashmiri Bazaar. Rawalpindi Sarafa Bazaar is famous for beaten gold and silver jewellery, brass and copper-ware.

Rawalpindi has long been a major market for exports from Kashmir and the North-West Frontier Province. The bazaars specialize in handicrafts such as inlaid sheesham and walnut furniture, Kashmiri silver, shawls and jackets, embroidered and woollen kurtas and household linen, potohar shoes and chappals, cane baskets and furniture, walking sticks, and hand-woven Kashmiri and Bokhara carpets.

== Public Facilitation Center ==
- e-Khidmat Center Rawalpindi is located near District Courts Rawalpindi, was established in 2014, and delivered 16 services initially.

== Parks and gardens ==
- Ayub National Park is located beyond the old Presidency on Grand Trunk (G.T.) Road. It covers an area of about 2,300 acres (9.3 km^{2}) and has a play area, lake with boating facility, an aquarium, a garden-restaurant and an open-air theatre. The Army Heritage Foundation has built many more facilities including a football stadium, a hockey stadium, motocross racing track and AHF museum.
- Liaquat National Bagh, sometimes known as Liaquat Bagh and formerly Municipal Park, is of historical interest. The first prime minister of Pakistan, Liaquat Ali Khan, was assassinated here in 1951.
- Situated near Ayub National Park, Rawalpindi Golf Course was completed in 1926 by Rawalpindi Golf Club, one of the oldest golf clubs of Pakistan. The facility was initially developed as a nine-hole course. After several phases of development, it is now a 27-hole course. From the clubhouse, there is a panoramic view of Faisal Mosque, the twin cities of Islamabad and Rawalpindi, and the course itself. Major golf tournaments are regularly held here.
- Rawalpindi Public Park (well known as Nawaz Sharif ParK) is located on Murree Road near Shamsabad. The Park was opened in 1991. It has a play area for children, lawns, fountains and flower beds. A cricket stadium was built in 1992 opposite the Public Park. The 1996 World Cup cricket matches were held on this cricket ground.
- 502 Park (well known as Zia Shaheed Park named after General Muhammad Zia-Ul-Haq, former president and Chief of Army Staff) is located on Defence Road segment of Adyala Road in Chaklala Cantt. It was basically built as a testing ground for military vehicles repaired in the adjacent 502 Central Workshop and continues to be used for the purpose in addition to recreational facilities including a small lake with boating facility, a lake view restaurant, a mini zoo, jogging track, playing area and skating court for children.

== Sports venues and stadiums ==
- Rawalpindi Cricket Stadium
- Shoaib Akhtar Stadium
- KRL Cricket Stadium
- Army Hockey Stadium
- Army Football Stadium
- Municipal Football Stadium, Satellite Town
- Jinnah Park, near Kachari Chowk, Civil Lines
- Romi Park, Peshawar Road
