= Prithvi Raj Singh Oberoi =

Indian hotelier (1929–2023)

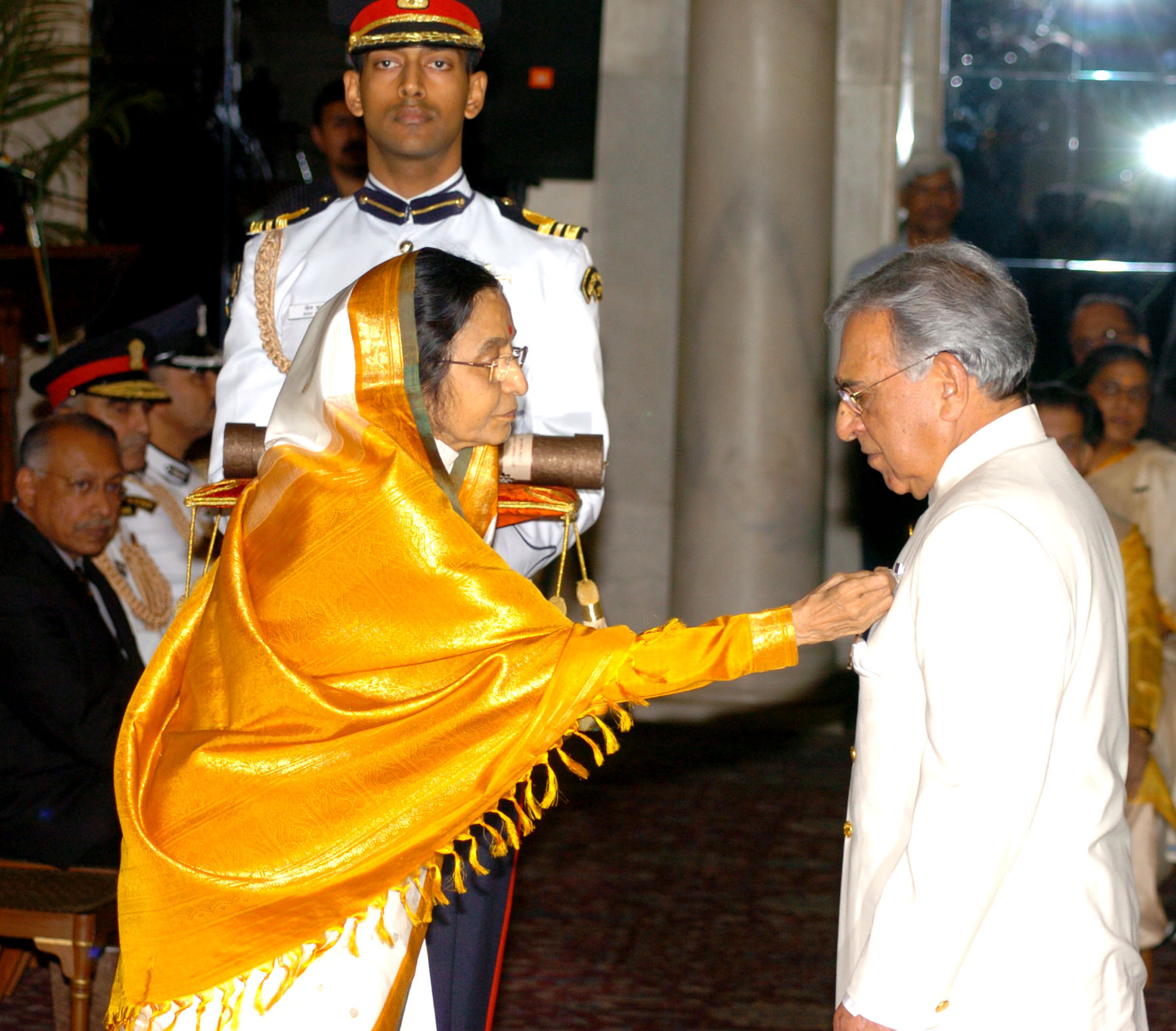
- President Pratibha Patil presenting the Padma Vibhushan to Oberoi in 2008
- Born: 3 February 1929; British India
- Died: 14 November 2023 (aged 94); Delhi, India
- Education: St. Paul's School, Darjeeling
- Occupation: Businessman
- Children: 3
- Parent: Mohan Singh Oberoi (father)
- Awards: Padma Vibushan in 2008

Prithvi Raj Singh Oberoi (3 February 1929 – 14 November 2023), also called Biki Oberoi, was an Indian hotelier. He was the executive chairman of the third-largest hospitality chain in India, The Oberoi Group, which runs a chain of luxury hotels under the Oberoi Hotels & Resorts and Trident brands.

In 2008, the Government of India awarded Oberoi the Padma Vibushan, India's second-highest civilian honour, in recognition of his exceptional service to the country. Popularly known as "Biki", in 2002 he took over as the chairman of EIH Limited after the death of Mohan Singh Oberoi, his father and the founding chairman of The Oberoi Group, and remained CEO of EIH Ltd until 2013.

== Early life ==
Prithvi Raj Singh Oberoi was born on 3 February 1929. His father was businessman Mohan Singh Oberoi. Oberoi was one of 5 siblings, including an older brother, Tilak Raj.

He was educated at St. Paul's School, Darjeeling, India, and later in the United Kingdom and Lausanne, Switzerland, where he graduated with a degree in hotel management. Oberoi's father, Mohan Singh, told him to travel the world and stay at leading hotels to understand luxury hospitality, and Oberoi stated that he did not have to work until he was past the age of 30.

== Career ==
Oberoi joined his father's hotels group company, EIH, in 1961. Oberoi and his brother Tilak Raj worked together; however Tilak Raj died in 1984. In 1967, he established The Oberoi Centre of Learning and Development in Delhi. He also founded the Oberoi Group's Vilas brand of hotels, beginning with Amarvilas in Agra and Udaivilas in Udaipur. Oberoi's management of his business was different from his father, Mohan Singh, and focused particularly on food, hiring foreign chefs and investing in new restaurants. After the terrorists attacked his Trident Hotel in Mumbai during the 2008 Mumbai attacks, Oberoi swiftly managed to repair and reopen his hotel.

He also served as a director of Jet Airways (India) Limited from 29 March 2004 onwards.

== Honours and awards ==
In 2008, Oberoi was awarded the Padma Vibhushan by the Indian government. Business India awarded him the Businessman of the Year title in 2008 and in 2010, he was presented with the 2010 Corporate Hotelier of the World award by Hotels magazine. In 2013, he was conferred the Lifetime Achievement Award for Management by the All India Management Association and in 2015, he was voted as one of CNBC TV18's Top 15 Indian Business Icons. In June 2022, Oberoi was recognized by the International Hospitality Institute as one of the 100 most powerful people in global hospitality. At the Ernst & Young Entrepreneur of the Year Award, Oberoi was awarded the Lifetime Achievement Award.

== Personal life and family ==
Oberoi was married twice and his second wife was Mirjana Jojic Oberoi. He had a son, Vikram Singh Oberoi, and two daughters, Natasha Oberoi and Anastasia Oberoi. At 89, he continued to live at the Oberoi Farm, his house and office on the outskirts of Delhi. He also had a residence in a village outside Jaipur, Rajasthan. Oberoi died in the early morning of 14 November 2023, at the age of 94.

Vikram succeeded his father as head of the Oberoi Group. After his death, an inheritance dispute occurred between his youngest daughter Anastasia, the daughter of Mirjana Jojic, and his other family members including his two older children and his nephew Arjun, the son of his brother Tilak Raj. The succession battle was caused by two conflicting wills of Oberoi's. In September 2024, the Delhi High Court issued an interim order favoring Anastasia. The order prohibits the transfer of shares in any of the Oberoi Group companies. The Delhi High Court protected Anastasia and her mother’s rights to their family home.
