= Model Town metro station, Delhi =

Metro station in Delhi, India

Model Town

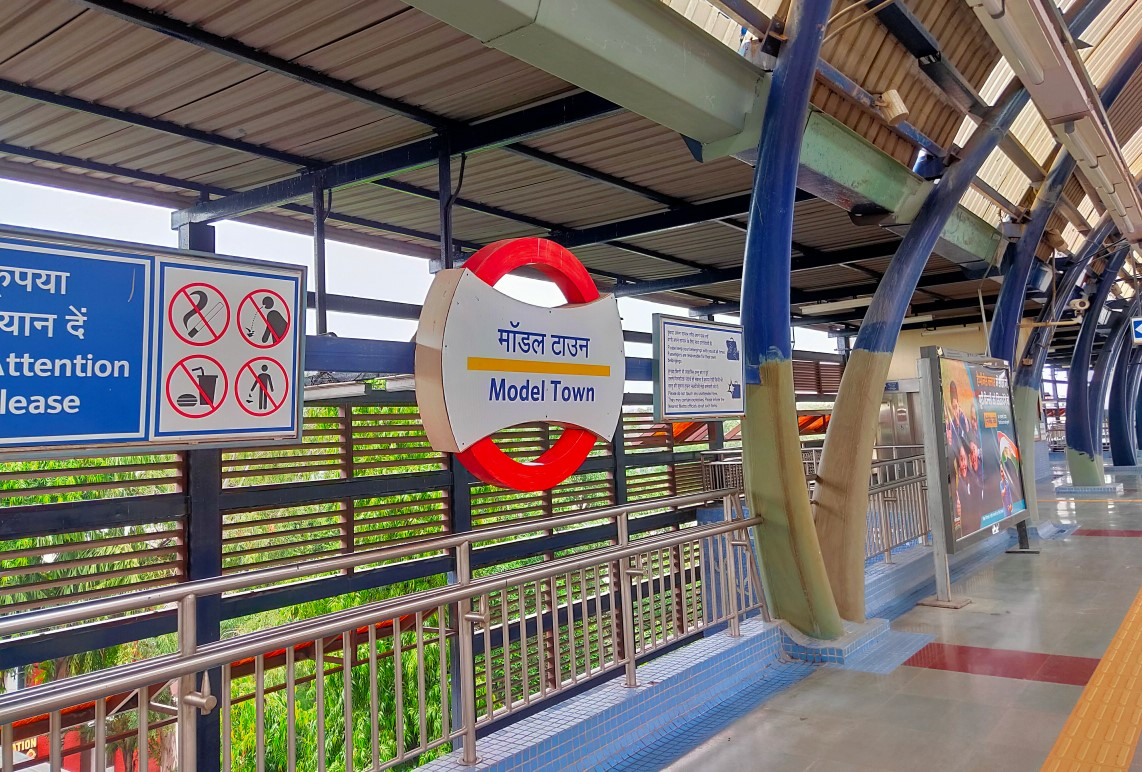

General information
- Location: Mahatma Gandhi Rd, Block B, Model Town Phase I, Model Town, New Delhi, Delhi 110054; India
- Coordinates: 28°42′10″N 77°11′38″E
- System: Delhi Metro station
- Owner: Delhi Metro
- Line: Yellow Line
- Platforms: Side platform; Platform-1 → Millennium City Centre Gurugram; Platform-2 → Samaypur Badli
- Tracks: 2

Construction
- Structure type: Elevated
- Platform levels: 2
- Accessible: Yes

Other information
- Station code: MDTW

History
- Opened: 4 February 2009; 17 years ago
- Electrified: 25 kV 50 Hz AC through overhead catenary

Passengers
- Jan 2015: 234,056; 7,550 Daily Average

Services
Preceding station	Delhi Metro	Following station
Azadpur towards Samaypur Badli	Yellow Line	Guru Tegh Bahadur Nagar towards Millennium City Centre Gurugram
Route map
Location

The Model Town metro station is located on the Yellow Line of the Delhi Metro.

== Station layout ==
L2	Side platform | Doors will open on the left
L2	Platform 1 Southbound	Towards → Millennium City Centre Gurugram; Next Station: Guru Tegh Bahadur Nagar
L2	Platform 2 Northbound	Towards ← Samaypur Badli; Next Station: Azadpur Change at the next station for Pink Line
L2	Side platform | Doors will open on the left
L1	Concourse	Fare control, station agent, Metro Card vending machines, crossover
G	Street Level	Exit/Entrance

== Connections ==
Delhi Transport Corporation bus routes number 78STL, 100, 100A, 100EXT, 101A, 101B, 101EXT, 103, 112, 113, 114, 120, 120A, 120B, 123, 124, 134, 135, 137, 140, 169, 169SPL, 171, 173, 191, 193, 195, 235, 259, 333, 341, 402, 402CL, 883, 901, 901CL, 921, 921CL, 921E, 921EXT, 971, 971A, 971B, 982, 982LSTL, TMS(-) and TMS- Lajpat Nagar/ Punjabi Bagh/ Azadpur serves the station.

== See also ==
- List of Delhi Metro stations
- Transport in Delhi
- Delhi Metro Rail Corporation
- Delhi Suburban Railway
- Delhi Transport Corporation
- North Delhi
- National Capital Region (India)
- List of rapid transit systems
- List of metro systems
