= Bisharatganj =

Basharatganj Vishratganj
- Town
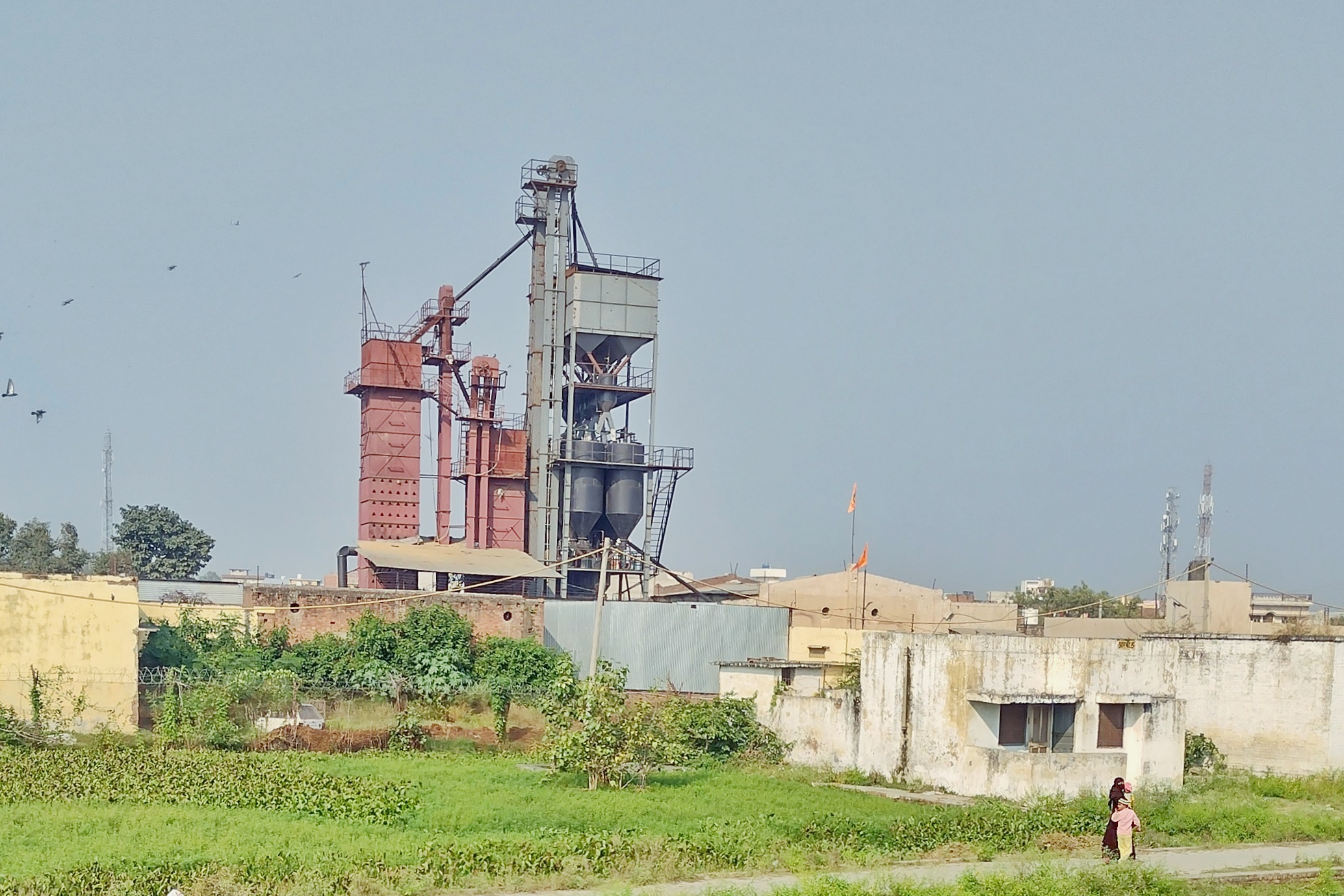
- Basharatganj view from railway station

- Location in Uttar Pradesh, India
- Coordinates: 28°18′35″N 79°16′01″E
- Country: India
- State: Uttar Pradesh
- District: Bareilly
- Founder: Nawab Meer Basharat Ali
- Elevation: 450 m (1,480 ft)

Population (2001)
  - Total: 12,980

Languages
  - Official: Hindi
- Time zone: UTC+5:30 (IST)

Basharatganj is a town and a nagar panchayat in Bareilly district in the state of Uttar Pradesh, India.

== Demographics ==
As of the 2011 Indian census, Bisharatganj had a population of 15,975. Males constituted 52% of the population and females 48%. Bisharatganj had an average literacy rate of 76%, higher than the national average of 59.5%; with male literacy of 85% and female literacy of 70%. 22% of the population is under 6 years of age.

== Transport ==
The town is served by the Basharatganj railway station.
