= Civil Lines metro station (Delhi) =

Metro station in Delhi, India

Civil Lines

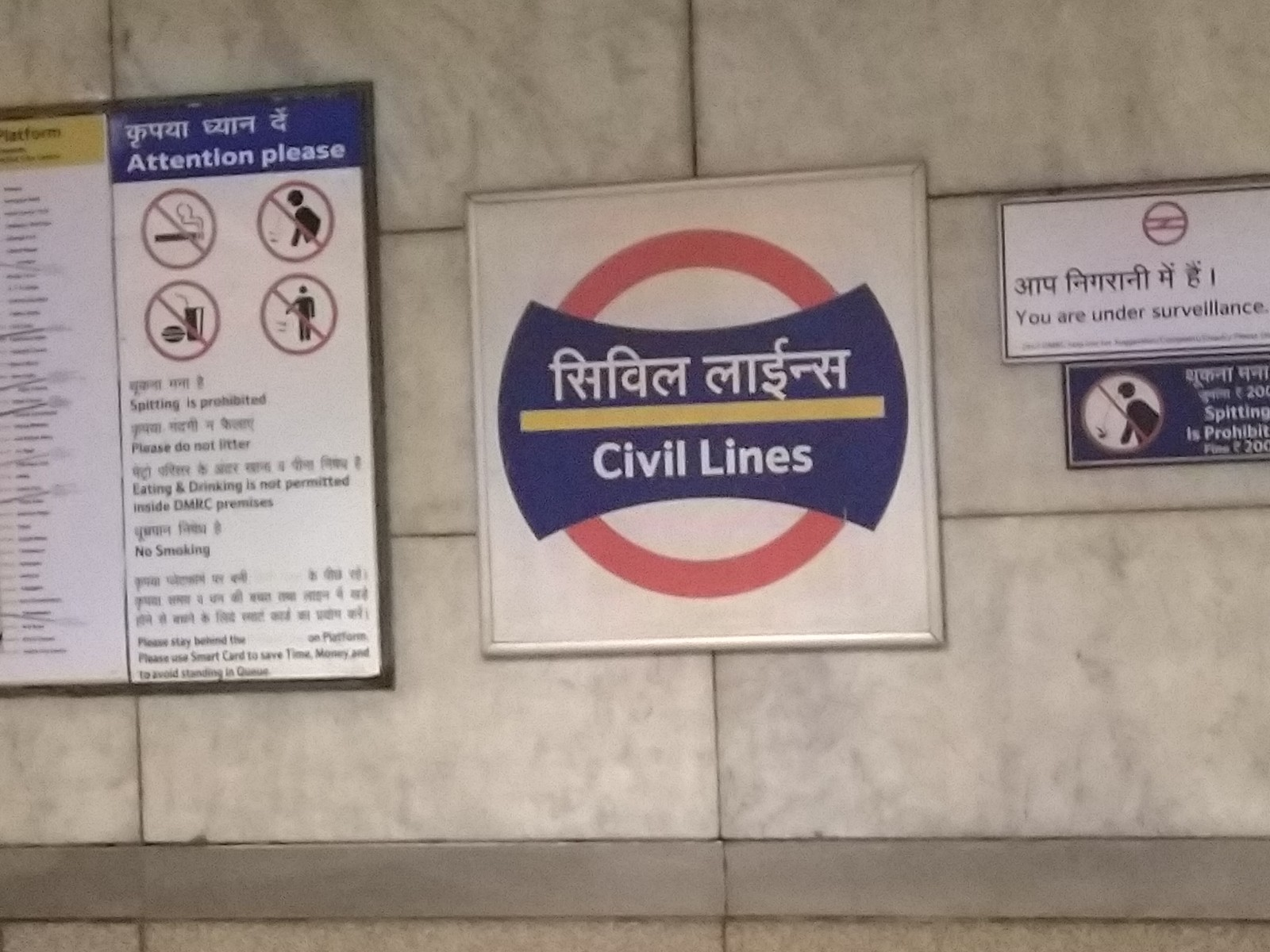

General information
- Location: Sham Nath Marg, Railway Colony, Civil Lines, New Delhi, 110054; India
- Coordinates: 28°40′37″N 77°13′30″E
- System: Delhi Metro station
- Owner: Delhi Metro
- Line: Yellow Line
- Platforms: Side platform; Platform-1 → Millennium City Centre Gurugram; Platform-2 → Samaypur Badli
- Tracks: 2

Construction
- Structure type: Underground
- Platform levels: 2
- Accessible: Yes

Other information
- Station code: CL

History
- Opened: 20 December 2004; 21 years ago
- Electrified: 25 kV 50 Hz AC through overhead catenary

Passengers
- 2015: 217,302; 7010 Daily Average

Services
Preceding station	Delhi Metro	Following station
Vidhan Sabha towards Samaypur Badli	Yellow Line	Kashmere Gate towards Millennium City Centre Gurugram
Route map
Location

The Civil Lines metro station is located on the Yellow Line of the Delhi Metro in the Civil Lines area of Delhi.

== Station layout ==
G	Street Level	Exit/Entrance
L1	Concourse	Fare control, station agent, Metro Card vending machines, crossover
L2	Side platform | Doors will open on the left
L2	Platform 1 Southbound	Towards → Millennium City Centre Gurugram; Next Station: Kashmere Gate Change at the next station for Violet Line or Red Line
L2	Platform 2 Northbound	Towards ← Samaypur Badli; Next Station: Vidhan Sabha
L2	Side platform | Doors will open on the left
L2

== Facilities ==
There are ATMs at Civil Lines metro station, along with a cafe and public bathrooms.

== Entry/Exits ==
Gate Number : 1

Sant Parmanand Hospital

Gate Number : 2

IP College

Gate Number : 3

Oberoi Maidens Hotel

== Connections ==
To HUDA city centre and Kashmiri gate

== See also ==
- List of Delhi Metro stations
- Transport in Delhi
- Delhi Metro Rail Corporation
- Delhi Suburban Railway
- Delhi Transport Corporation
- North Delhi
- National Capital Region (India)
- List of rapid transit systems
- List of metro systems
