= Civil Lines, Rawalpindi =

Civil Lines
- Neighbourhood
- Country: Pakistan
- Province: Punjab (Pakistan)
- District: Rawalpindi
- Time zone: UTC+5 (PST)

Civil Lines is a neighbourhood locality in Rawalpindi, Punjab. It was built by the British Raj for the civil officers.
