= Civil Lines =

Civil Lines, historically known as White Town, were residential neighborhoods developed during the British Raj for senior civilian officers, such as the Divisional Commissioner and District Magistrate. These townships were established across the Indian subcontinent and were specifically allotted to British colonial officials and administrative personnel in the respective regions. The areas were usually more spacious, well-planned, and better maintained, reflecting the status and administrative role of the officers who resided there. The term "Civil Lines" was used to distinguish the residential spaces for colonial officers from the "Native" areas, where the local population lived.

Civil Lines are distinct from forts and cantonments, which were expressly military establishments.

== In India ==
- Civil Lines, Prayagraj
- Civil Lines, Bareilly
- Civil Lines, Budaun
- Civil Lines, Delhi
- Civil Lines, Jabalpur
- Civil Lines, Jaipur
- Civil Lines, Jhansi
- Civil Lines, Kanpur
- Civil Lines, Moradabad
- Civil Lines, Nagpur
- Civil Lines, Roorkee
- Civil Lines, Raipur

== In Pakistan ==
- Civil Lines, Faisalabad
- Civil Lines, Karachi
- Civil Lines, Lahore
- Civil Lines, Gujranwala
- Civil Lines, Rawalpindi
