= Ram Nagar metro station =

Jaipur Metro's Pink Line metro station

Ram Nagar
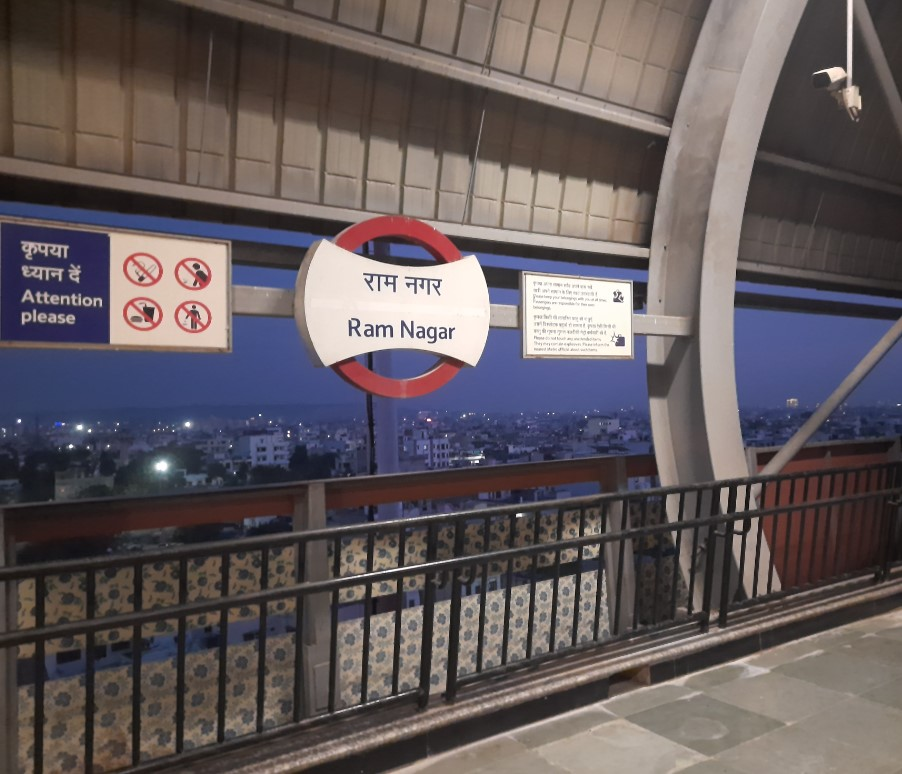

General information
- Location: Hawa Sadak Rd, Ramnagar Extension, Sodala, Jaipur, Rajasthan 302019
- Coordinates: 26°54′07″N 75°46′29″E
- System: Jaipur Metro station
- Owner: Jaipur Metro
- Operator: Jaipur Metro Rail Corporation (JMRC)
- Line: Pink Line
- Platforms: Side platform Platform-1 → Badi Chaupar; Platform-2 → Mansarovar
- Tracks: 2

Construction
- Structure type: Elevated, Double track
- Platform levels: 2
- Accessible: Yes

Other information
- Station code: RMNR

History
- Opened: June 3, 2015; 11 years ago
- Electrified: 25 kV 50 Hz AC through overhead catenary

Services
| Preceding station | Jaipur Metro | Following station |
|---|---|---|
| Shyam Nagar towards Mansarovar | Pink Line | Civil Lines towards Badi Chaupar |
Route map
Location

Ram Nagar is an elevated metro station on the East-West Corridor of the Pink Line of Jaipur Metro in Jaipur, India. This station was opened on 3 June 2015, which serves the Ram Nagar colony.

== Station layout ==
| G | Street Level | Exit/Entrance |
| L1 | Mezzanine | Fare control, station agent, Metro Card vending machines, crossover |
| L2 | Side platform | Doors will open on the left |
| L2 | Platform 1 Eastbound | Towards → Badi Chaupar; Next Station: Civil Lines |
| L2 | Platform 2 Westbound | Towards ← Mansarovar; Next Station: Shyam Nagar |
| L2 | Side platform | Doors will open on the left |
| L2 |

== See also ==
- Jaipur Metro
- Blue
- List of Jaipur Metro stations
- Jaipur BRTS
- List of rapid transit systems in India
- List of Metro Systems
- Rajasthan State Road Transport Corporation
