= Railway Station metro station =

Jaipur Metro's Pink Line metro station

Railway Station
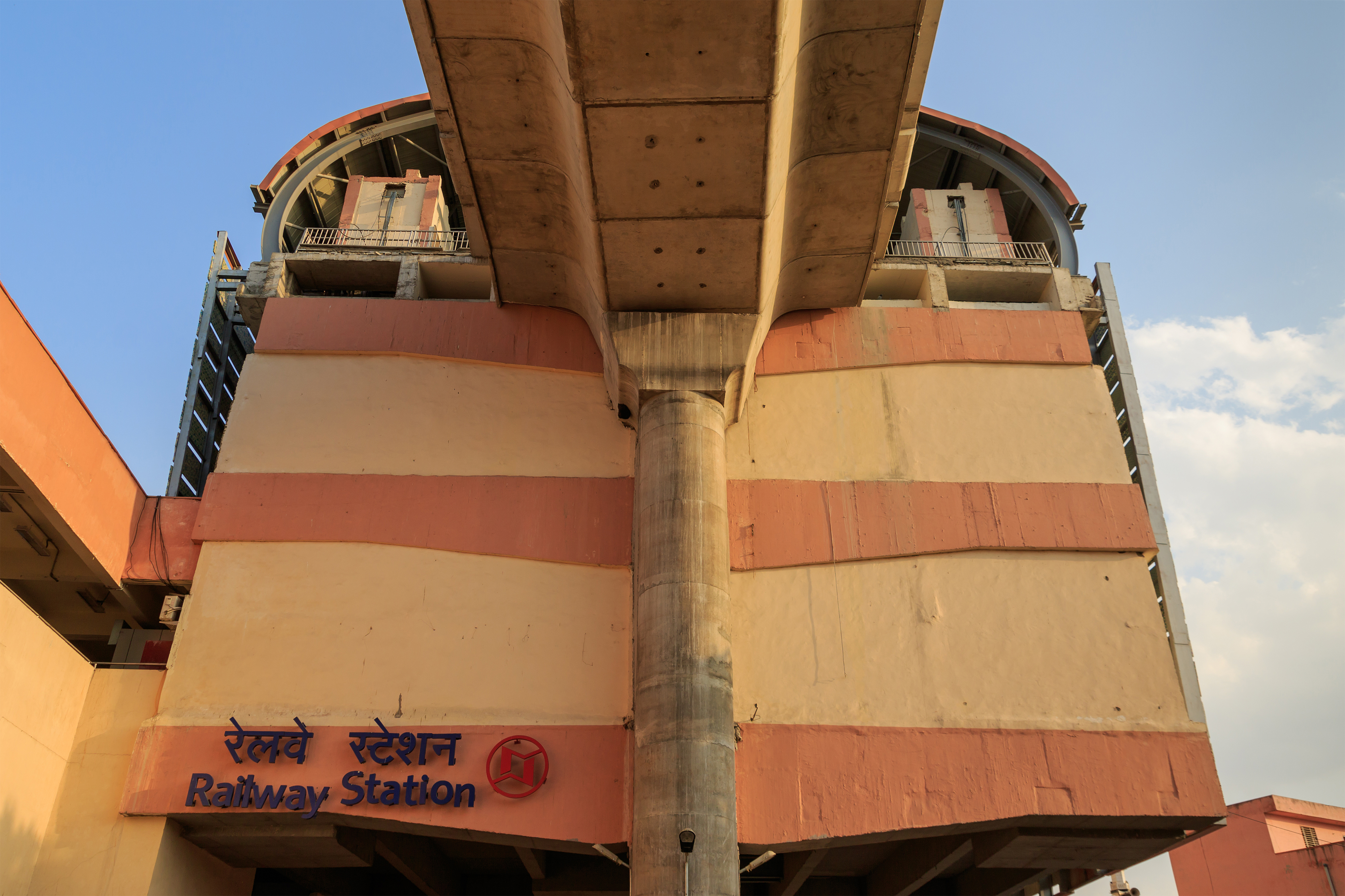

General information
- Location: Hasanpura Rd, Gopalbari, Jaipur, Rajasthan 302016; India
- Coordinates: 26°55′07″N 75°47′24″E
- System: Jaipur Metro station
- Owner: Jaipur Metro
- Operator: Jaipur Metro Rail Corporation (JMRC)
- Line: Pink Line
- Platforms: Side platform Platform-1 → Badi Chaupar; Platform-2 → Mansarovar
- Tracks: 2
- Connections: Jaipur Junction

Construction
- Structure type: Elevated, Double track
- Platform levels: 2
- Accessible: Yes

Other information
- Station code: MRSN

History
- Opened: June 3, 2015; 11 years ago
- Electrified: 25 kV 50 Hz AC through overhead catenary

Services
Preceding station	Jaipur Metro	Following station
Civil Lines towards Mansarovar	Pink Line	Sindhi Camp towards Badi Chaupar
Route map
Location

Railway Station is an elevated metro station on the East-West Corridor of the Pink Line of Jaipur Metro in Jaipur, India. This station was opened on 3 June 2015, which connects the main Jaipur Junction railway station.

== Station layout ==
G	Street Level	Exit/Entrance
L1	Mezzanine	Fare control, station agent, Metro Card vending machines, crossover
L2	Side platform | Doors will open on the left
L2	Platform 1 Eastbound	Towards → Badi Chaupar; Next Station: Utkarsh Sindhi Camp
L2	Platform 2 Westbound	Towards ← Mansarovar; Next Station: Civil Lines
L2	Side platform | Doors will open on the left
L2

== Connections ==
Jaipur Junction railway station

== See also ==
- Blue
- List of Jaipur Metro stations
- Jaipur BRTS
- List of rapid transit systems in India
- List of Metro Systems
- Rajasthan State Road Transport Corporation
