= New Aatish Market metro station =

Jaipur Metro's Pink Line metro station

New Aatish Market
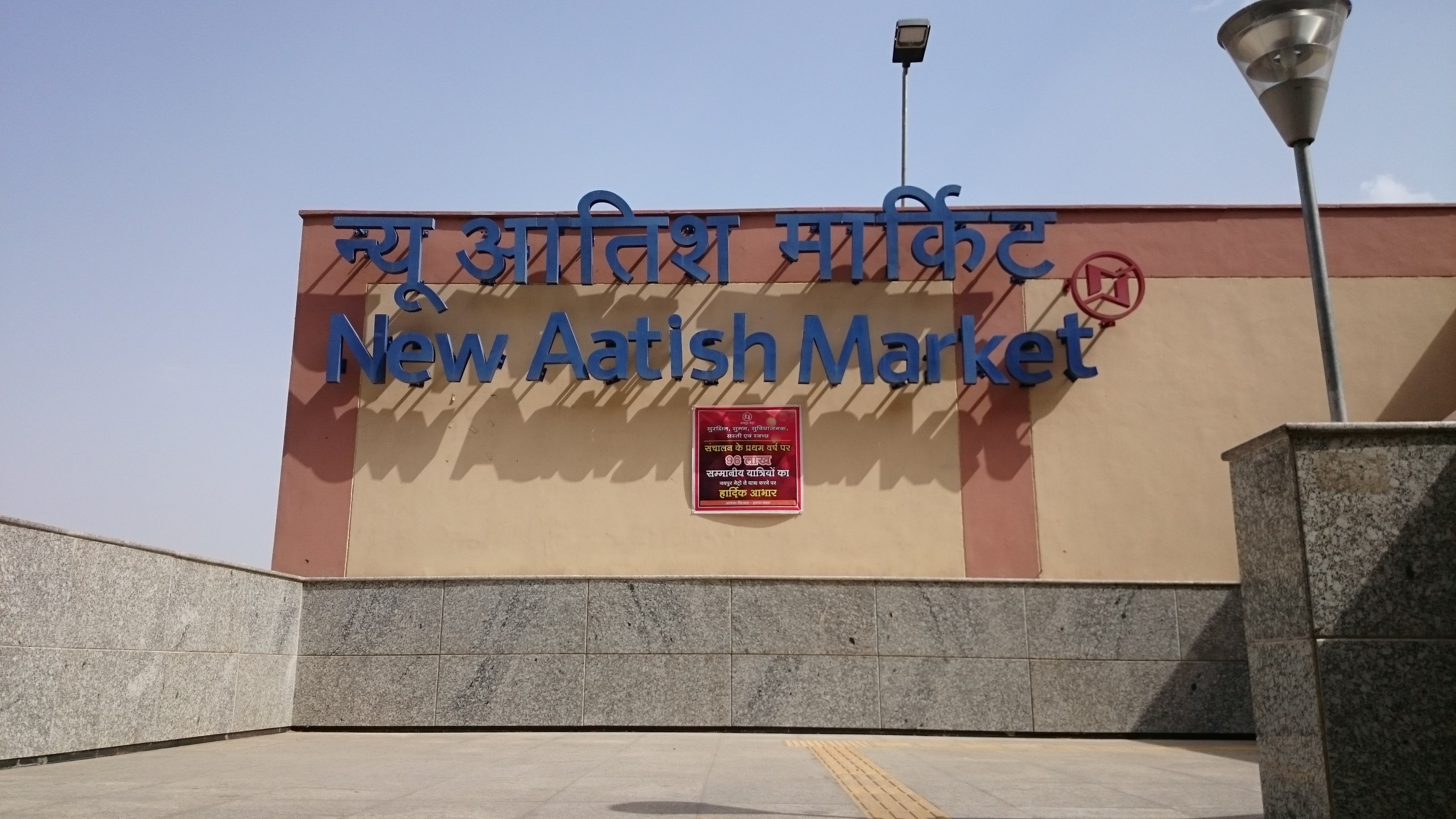

General information
- Location: New Sanganer Road, Jaipur Rajasthan 302019
- Coordinates: 26°52′49″N 75°45′53″E
- System: Jaipur Metro station
- Owner: Jaipur Metro
- Operator: Jaipur Metro Rail Corporation (JMRC)
- Line: Pink Line
- Platforms: Side platform Platform-1 → Badi Chaupar; Platform-2 → Mansarovar
- Tracks: 2

Construction
- Structure type: Elevated, Double track
- Platform levels: 2
- Accessible: Yes

Other information
- Station code: NAMT

History
- Opened: June 3, 2015; 11 years ago
- Electrified: 25 kV 50 Hz AC through overhead catenary

Services
Preceding station	Jaipur Metro	Following station
Mansarovar Terminus	Pink Line	Vivek Vihar towards Badi Chaupar
Route map
Location

New Aatish Market is an elevated metro station on the East-West Corridor of the Pink Line of Jaipur Metro in Jaipur, India. This station was opened on 3 June 2015, which serves the New Aatish Market colony.

== Station layout ==
G	Street Level	Exit/Entrance
L1	Mezzanine	Fare control, station agent, Metro Card vending machines, crossover
L2	Side platform | Doors will open on the left
L2	Platform 1 Eastbound	Towards → Badi Chaupar; Next Station: Vivek Vihar
L2	Platform 2 Westbound	Towards ← Mansarovar
L2	Side platform | Doors will open on the left
L2

== See also ==
- Orange Line (Jaipur Metro)
- List of Jaipur Metro stations
- Jaipur BRTS
- Rapid transit in India
- List of Metro Systems
- Rajasthan State Road Transport Corporation
