= Chhoti Chaupar metro station =

Jaipur Metro's Pink Line metro station

Chhoti Chaupar
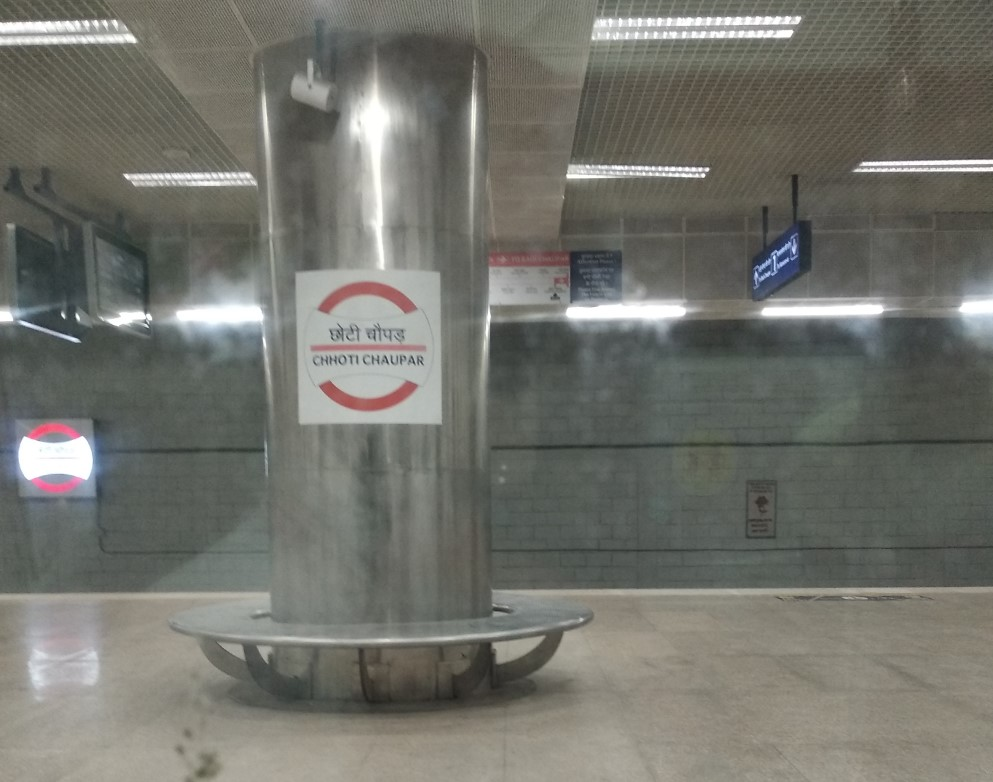

General information
- Location: Chhoti Chaupar, Jaipur
- Coordinates: 26.924720°N 75.818456°E
- System: Jaipur Metro station
- Owner: Jaipur Metro
- Operator: Jaipur Metro Rail Corporation (JMRC)
- Line: Pink Line
- Platforms: Island platform Platform-1 → Badi Chaupar; Platform-2 → Mansarovar
- Tracks: 2

Construction
- Structure type: Underground, Double track
- Platform levels: 2

Other information
- Station code: CTCP

History
- Opened: September 23, 2020; 5 years ago
- Electrified: 25 kV 50 Hz AC through overhead catenary

Services
Preceding station	Jaipur Metro	Following station
Chandpole towards Mansarovar	Pink Line	Badi Chaupar Terminus
Route map
Location

Chhoti Chaupar is an underground metro station on the East-West Corridor of the Pink Line of Jaipur Metro in Jaipur, India. This station was opened on 23 September 2020.

== Station layout ==
G	Street level	Exit/ Entrance
M	Mezzanine	Fare control, station agent, Ticket/token, shops
P	Platform 1 Eastbound	Towards → Badi Chaupar
P	Island platform | Doors will open on the right
P	Platform 2 Westbound	Towards ← Mansarovar; Next Station: Chandpole

== See also ==
- Jaipur Metro
- Blue
- List of Jaipur Metro stations
- Jaipur BRTS
- List of rapid transit systems in India
- List of Metro Systems
- Rajasthan State Road Transport Corporation
