= Pink Line (Jaipur Metro) =

Metro line in Jaipur, India

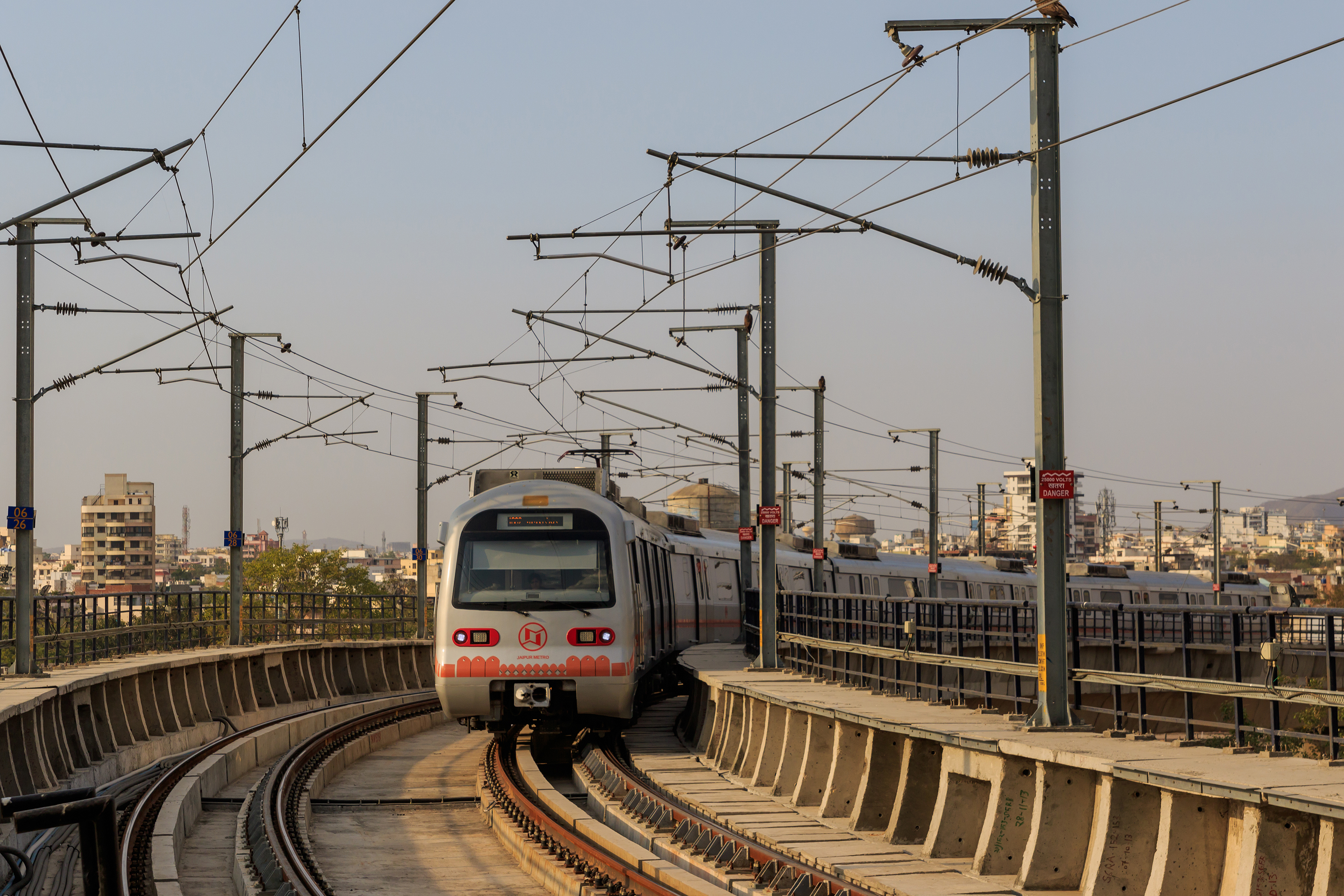

Overview
- Owner: Jaipur Metro Rail Corporation LTD.
- Locale: Jaipur, Rajasthan, India
- Termini: Mansarovar (West); Badi Chaupar (East)
- Stations: 11

Service
- Type: Rapid Transit
- System: Jaipur Metro
- Operator: JMRC
- Daily ridership: 37,000 (March 2023)

History
- Opened: 3 June 2015; 11 years ago

Technical
- Line length: 11.97 km (7.44 mi)
- Number of tracks: 2
- Character: Elevated & Underground
- Track gauge: 1,435 mm (4 ft 8 1/2 in) standard gauge
- Electrification: 25 kV 50 Hz AC from overhead catenary
- Operating speed: 80 km/h (50 mph)

The Pink Line of the Jaipur Metro is part of the rapid transit system in the city of Jaipur, India. It is also called East-West Corridor of Jaipur. It consists of 11 metro stations from Mansarovar in the West to Badi Chaupar in the East. The line with a length of 11.97 kilometers (7.44 mi) is mostly elevated and partially underground and has been laid to connect the oldest part of Jaipur to rest of it.

This is the Metro line that got flagged off on 3 June 2015, and has been named as Pink Line, as the line passes through the Pink City.

The Pink line has planned interchange with the Orange Line of the Jaipur Metro. it also connects Mansarovar, the Largest Colony of Asia with the Jaipur Junction railway station of the Indian Railways, Sindhi Camp Bus Stand, Heritage Sites like Hawa Mahal, Town Hall, Jantar Mantar, City Palace etc.

== Extentions ==
=== Phase-I B extension ===
Under Phase-I B, the Pink Line was extended further East from Chandpole station by 2.349 km. Two additional stations got built to extend the line to Badi Chaupar. The stations on this extension are:
1) Chhoti Chaupar
2) Badi Chaupar.

The construction of the extension was delayed following the discovery of an ancient stepwell.

=== Phase-I C extension ===
For Phase 1C, Jaipur Metro Rail Corporation (JMRC) plans to extend the Pink Line from Badi Chaupar to Transport Nagar. For the same, the corporation has prepared a detailed project report (DPR) of Phase 1C by taking public suggestions. According to the DPR, the estimated project cost will be Rs 856 crore, including cost of land and taxes, The total length of the project will be 2.85km (2.26km Underground and 0.59km Elevated). This project was expected to be completed till March 2025 however it has since missed the deadline. Once constructed, the estimated ridership between the entire stretch, Mansarovar to Transport Nagar, will be over 1.38 lakh till 2031. The stations on this extension are:
1) Badi Chaupar
2) Ramganj Chaupar
3) Transport Nagar

== History ==
The following dates represent the dates the section opened to the public, not the private inauguration.

History
Name	Extension date	Termini		Length	Stations
Phase-I A	3 June 2015	Mansarovar	Chandpole	9.63 kilometers (5.98 mi)	9
Phase-I B	23 September 2020	Chandpole	Badi Chaupar	2.34 kilometers (1.45 mi)	2
Total		Mansarovar	Badi Chaupar	11.97 kilometers (7.44 mi)	11

== List of stations ==
Pink Line
#	Station Name		Inter-station Distance (in km)	Opening	Connections	Layout	Coordinates
#	English	Hindi	Inter-station Distance (in km)	Opening	Connections	Layout	Coordinates
1	Ajmer Road Chauraha	अजमेर रोड चौराहा		Under Construction	None	Elevated	
2	Mansarovar	मानसरोवर	0	June 3, 2015	None	Elevated	26°52′46″N 75°45′00″E
3	New Aatish Market	न्यू आतिश मार्केट	1.454	June 3, 2015	None	Elevated	26°52′49″N 75°45′53″E
4	Vivek Vihar	विवेक विहार	1.105	June 3, 2015	None	Elevated	26°53′20″N 75°46′07″E
5	Shyam Nagar	श्याम नगर	0.881	June 3, 2015	None	Elevated	26°53′48″N 75°46′14″E
6	Ram Nagar	राम नगर	0.747	June 3, 2015	None	Elevated	26°54′07″N 75°46′29″E
7	Civil Lines	सिविल लाइन्स	1.086	June 3, 2015	None	Elevated	26°54′35″N 75°46′53″E
8	Railway Station	रेलवे स्टेशन	1.583	June 3, 2015	Jaipur Junction	Elevated	26°55′07″N 75°47′24″E
9	Khasa Kothi	ख़ासा कोठी		Planned	Orange Line (Approved)	Elevated	
10	Sindhi Camp	सिन्धी कैंप	1.338	June 3, 2015	Sindhi Camp	Elevated	26°55′21″N 75°47′59″E
11	Chandpole	चाँदपोल	0.786	June 3, 2015	None	Underground	26°55′35″N 75°48′27″E
12	Chhoti Chaupar	छोटी चौपड़	1.221	September 23, 2020	None	Underground	26°55′29″N 75°49′06″E
13	Badi Chaupar	बड़ी चौपड़	0.853	September 23, 2020	None	Underground	26°55′23″N 75°49′37″E
14	Galtaji Gate	गलताजी गेट	TBD	Under Construction	None	Underground	
15	Transport Nagar	ट्रांसपोर्ट नगर	TBD	Under Construction	None	Elevated	

== See also ==
- Jaipur Metro
- Orange Line
- List of Jaipur Metro stations
- Jaipur BRTS
- List of rapid transit systems in India
- List of Metro Systems
