= Hawa Mahal =

Palace in Jaipur, Rajasthan, India

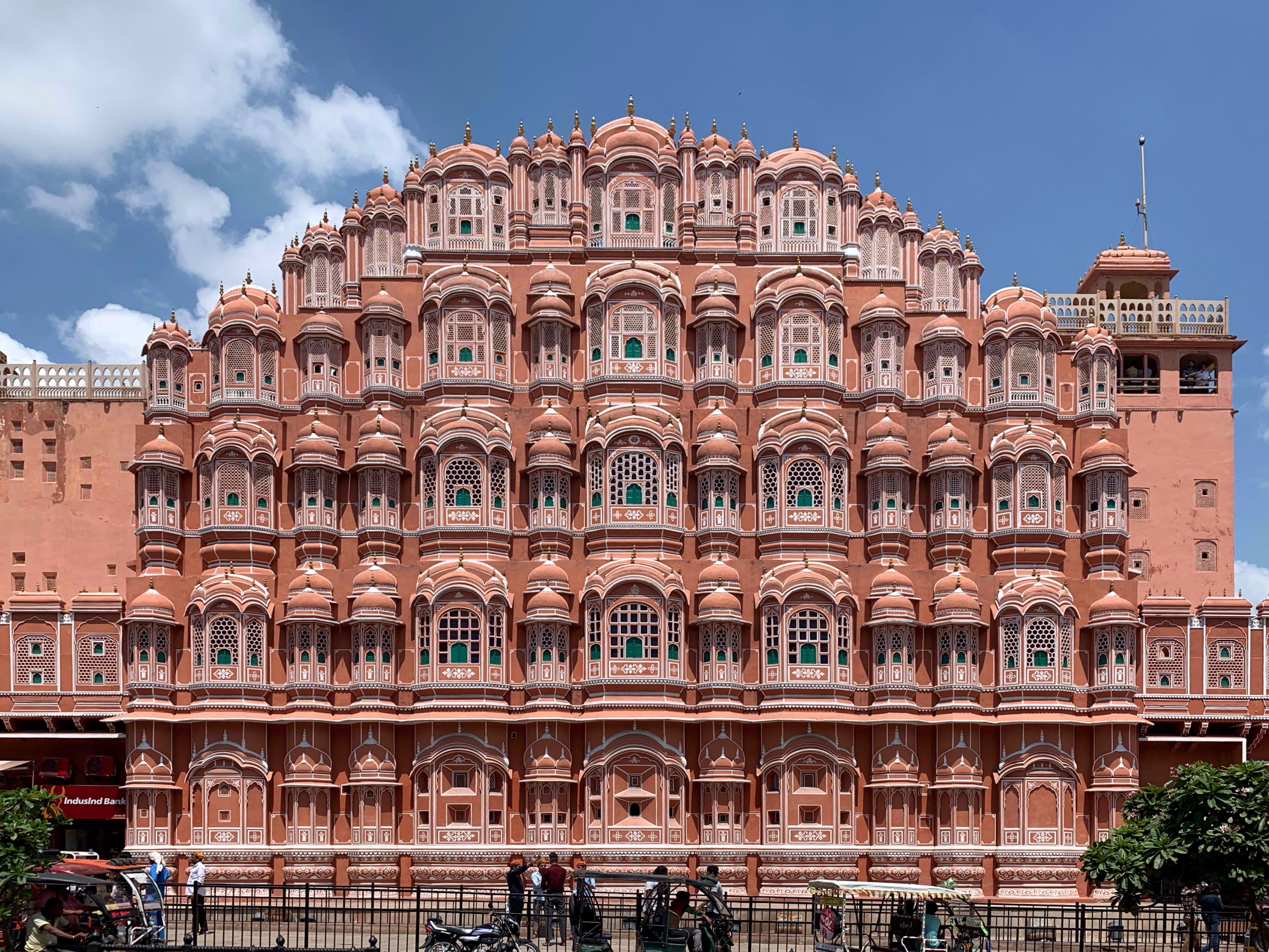
- Eastern façade of the Hawa Mahal, 2022

- Location within Jaipur Location within Rajasthan Location within India
- Alternative names: Palace of the Winds, Palace of the Breeze

General information
- Architectural style: Hindu Rajput Architecture
- Location: Jaipur, Rajasthan, India
- Coordinates: 26.9239°N 75.8267°E
- Completed: 1799; 227 years ago

Technical details
- Structural system: Red, yellow, black, rainbow and pink sandstone

Design and construction
- Architect: Lal Chand Ustad
- Main contractor: Pratap Singh of Jaipur

Other information
- Public transit: Pink Line; Badi Chaupar

The Hawa Mahal is a palace in the city of Jaipur, Rajasthan, India. Built from red and pink sandstone, it is on the edge of the City Palace, Jaipur, and extends to the Zenana, or women's chambers.

Hawa Mahal, also known as the "Palace of Winds", was built in 1799 by Maharaja Sawai Pratap Singh. The palace is known for its honeycomb-like façade, featuring numerous small windows and balconies.

Hawa Mahal derives its name from its 953 windows, known as jharokhas, which are arranged in a honeycomb-like pattern. These openings facilitate natural ventilation, helping to keep the interior of the palace cool during the summers. The structure was built in 1799 by the Rajput Emperor Maharaja Sawai Pratap Singh, grandson of Maharaja Sawai Jai Singh, the founder of the city of Jaipur of Rajasthan. He was so inspired by the unique structure of Khetri Mahal that he built this grand and historical palace.

It was designed by Lal Chand Ustad. Its five-floor exterior is akin to a honeycomb with its 953 small windows called Jharokhas decorated with intricate latticework. The original intent of the lattice design was to allow royal ladies to observe everyday life and festivals celebrated in the street below without being seen. This architectural feature also allowed cool air from the Venturi effect to pass through, thus making the whole area more pleasant during the high temperatures in summer. Many people see the Hawa Mahal from the street view and think it is the front of the palace, but it is the back.

In 2006, renovation works on the Mahal were undertaken, after a gap of 50 years, to give a facelift to the monument at an estimated cost of Rs 4.568 million. The corporate sector lent a hand to preserve the historical monuments of Jaipur and the Unit Trust of India has adopted Hawa Mahal to maintain it. The palace is an extended part of a huge complex. The stone-carved screens, small casements, and arched roofs are some of the features of this popular tourist spot. The monument also has delicately modelled hanging cornices.

== Name ==
Hawa Mahal (هوا محل) translates directly from Persian as 'wind palace'.

== Architecture ==
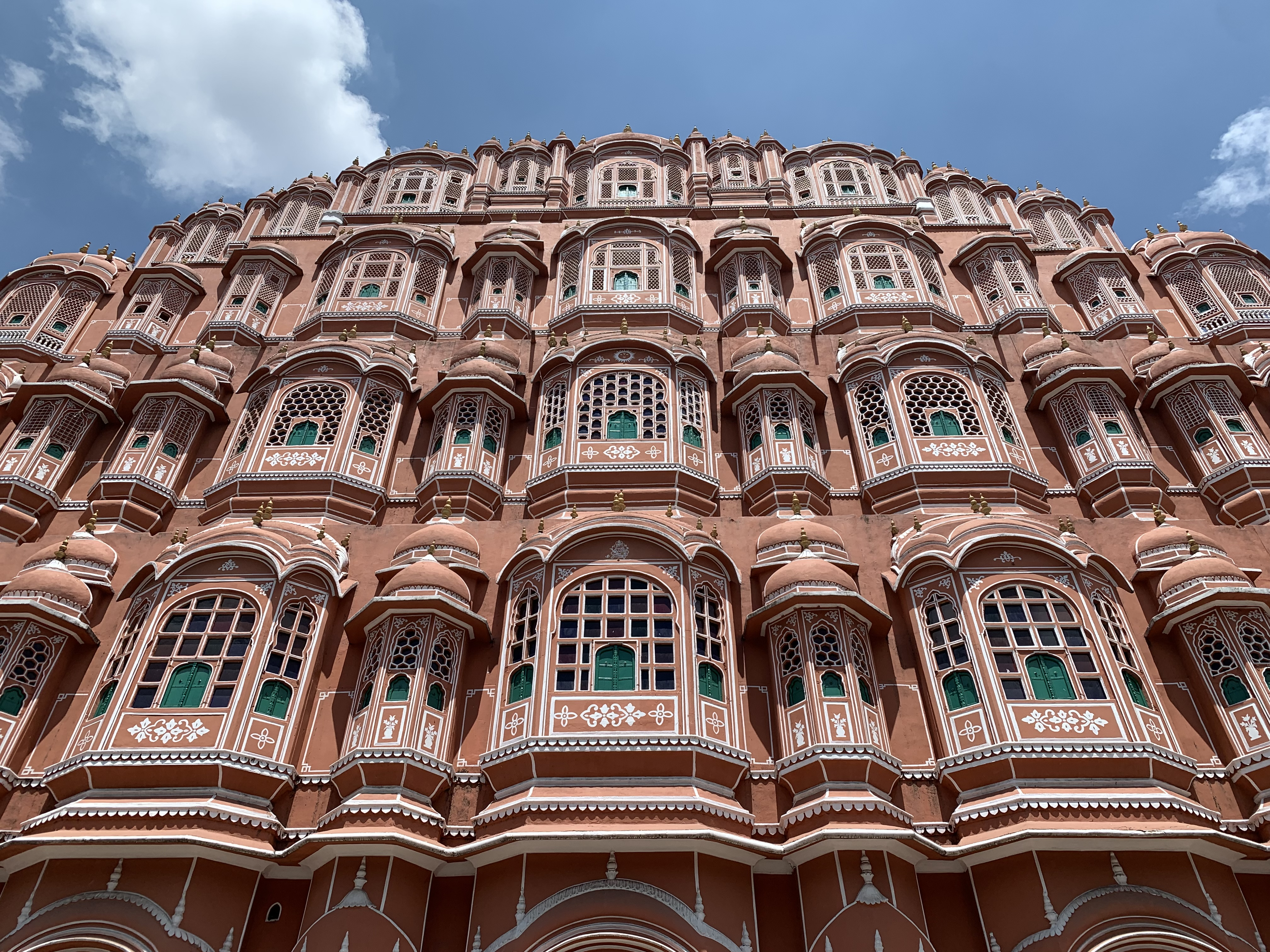
Details of the eastern façade

This palace is a five-storey pyramidal shaped monument that rises to about 50 feet (15 m). The top three floors of the structure have the width of a single room, while the first and second floors have patios in front of them. The front elevation, as seen from the street, is like a honeycomb with small portholes. Each porthole has miniature windows and carved sandstone grills, finials and domes. It gives the appearance of a mass of semi-octagonal bays, giving the monument its unique façade. The inner face on the back side of the building consists of chambers built with pillars and corridors with minimal ornamentation, and reach up to the top floor. The interior of the palace has been described as "having rooms of different coloured marbles, relieved by inlaid panels or gilding, while fountains adorn the centre of the courtyard".

Lal Chand Ustad was the architect. Built-in red and pink coloured sandstone, in keeping with the décor of the other monuments in the city, its colour is a full testimony to the epithet of "Pink City" given to Jaipur. Its façade with 953 niches with intricately carved jharokhas (some are made of wood) is a stark contrast to the plain-looking rear side of the structure. Its cultural and architectural heritage is a reflection of a fusion of Hindu Rajput architecture and Islamic Mughal architecture; the Rajput style is seen in the form of domed canopies, fluted pillars, lotus, and floral patterns, and the Islamic style is evident in its stone inlay filigree work and arches (as distinguished from its similarity with the Panch Mahal at Fatehpur Sikri).

The entry to the Hawa Mahal from the city palace side is through an imperial door. It opens into a large courtyard, which has double-storeyed buildings on three sides, with the Hawa Mahal enclosing it on the east side. An archaeological museum is also housed in this courtyard.

Hawa Mahal was also known as the chef-d'œuvre of Maharaja Jai Singh as it was his favourite resort because of the elegance and built-in interior of the Mahal. The cooling effect in the chambers, provided by the breeze passing through the small windows of the façade, was enhanced by the fountains provided at the centre of each of the chambers.

The top two floors of the Hawa Mahal are accessible only through ramps. The Mahal is maintained by the archaeological department of the Government of Rajasthan.

== Gallery ==
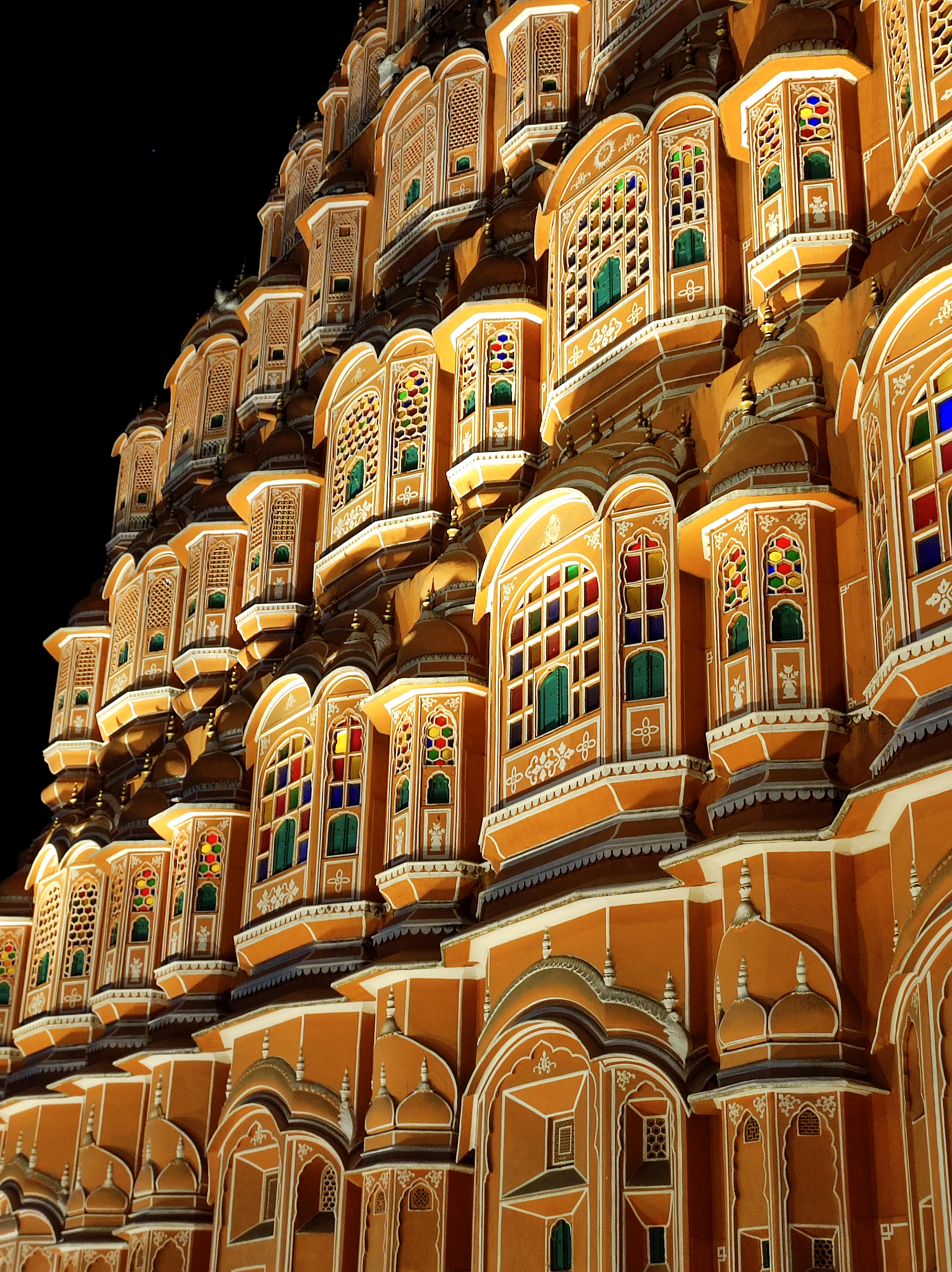
Night view of a section of the Hawa Mahal, illuminated against the night sky, with Mars visible above the building.

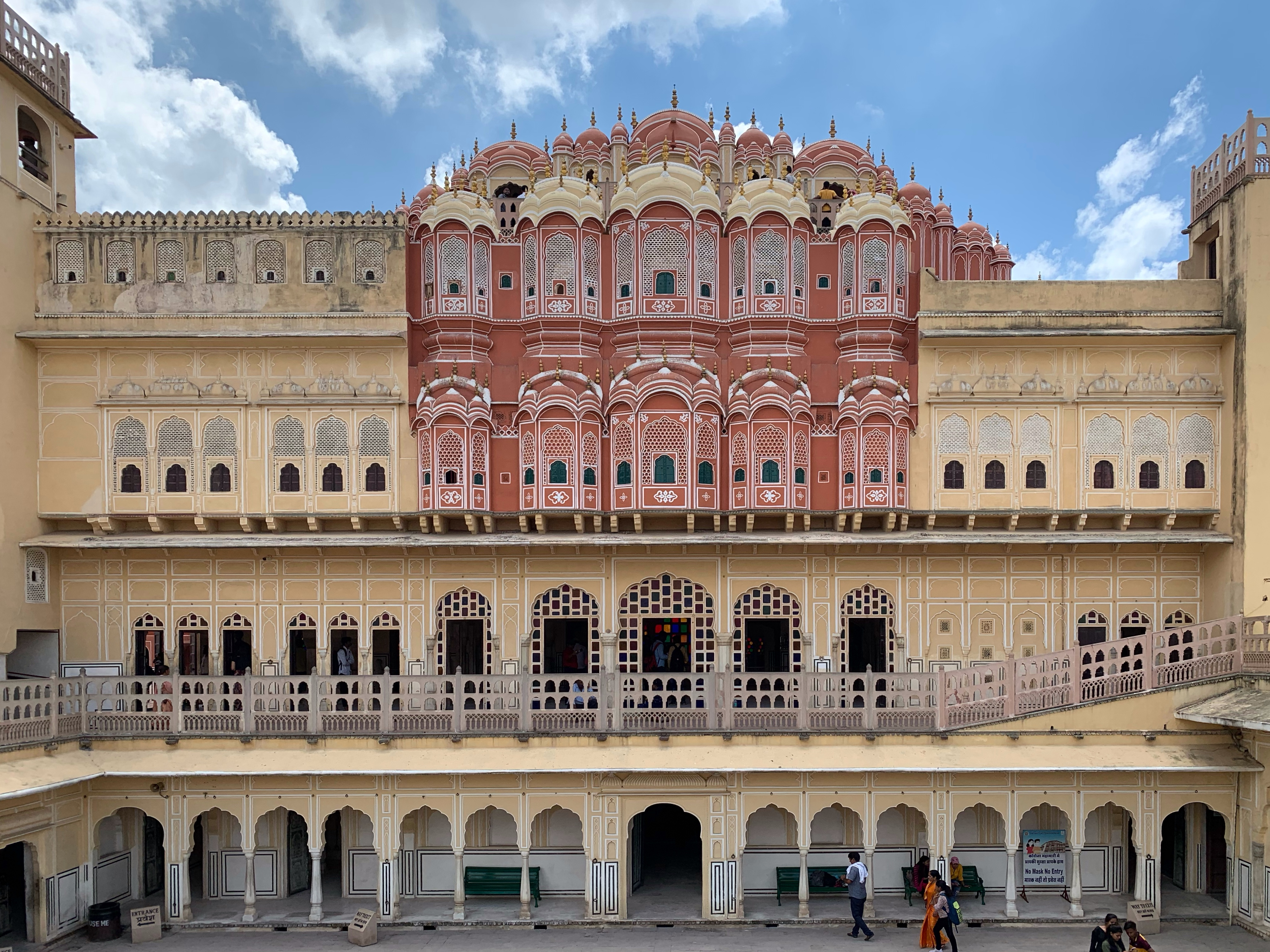
The posterior of the famous façade from inside of the Hawa Mahal

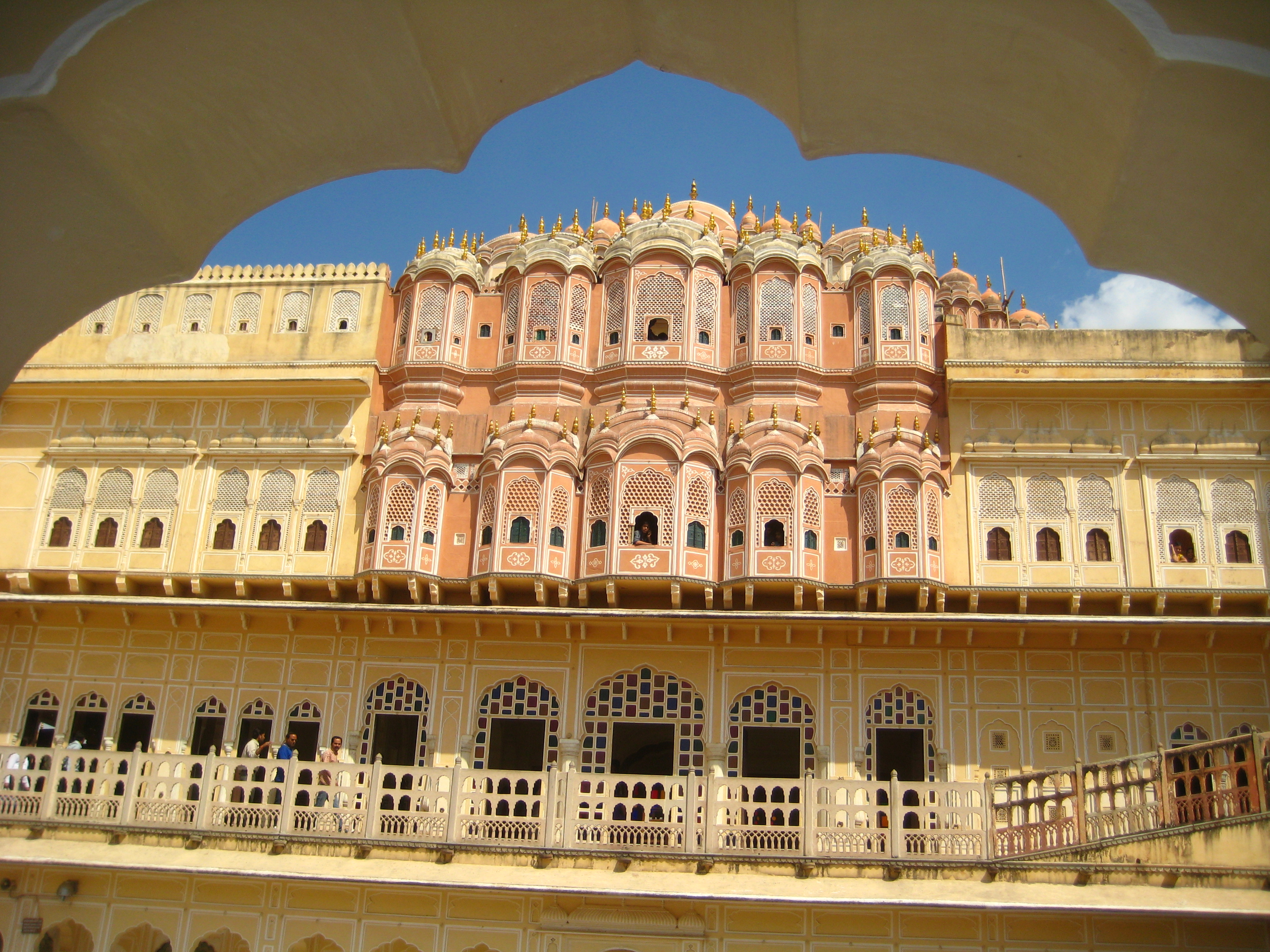
Rear view with the two most ornate top stories

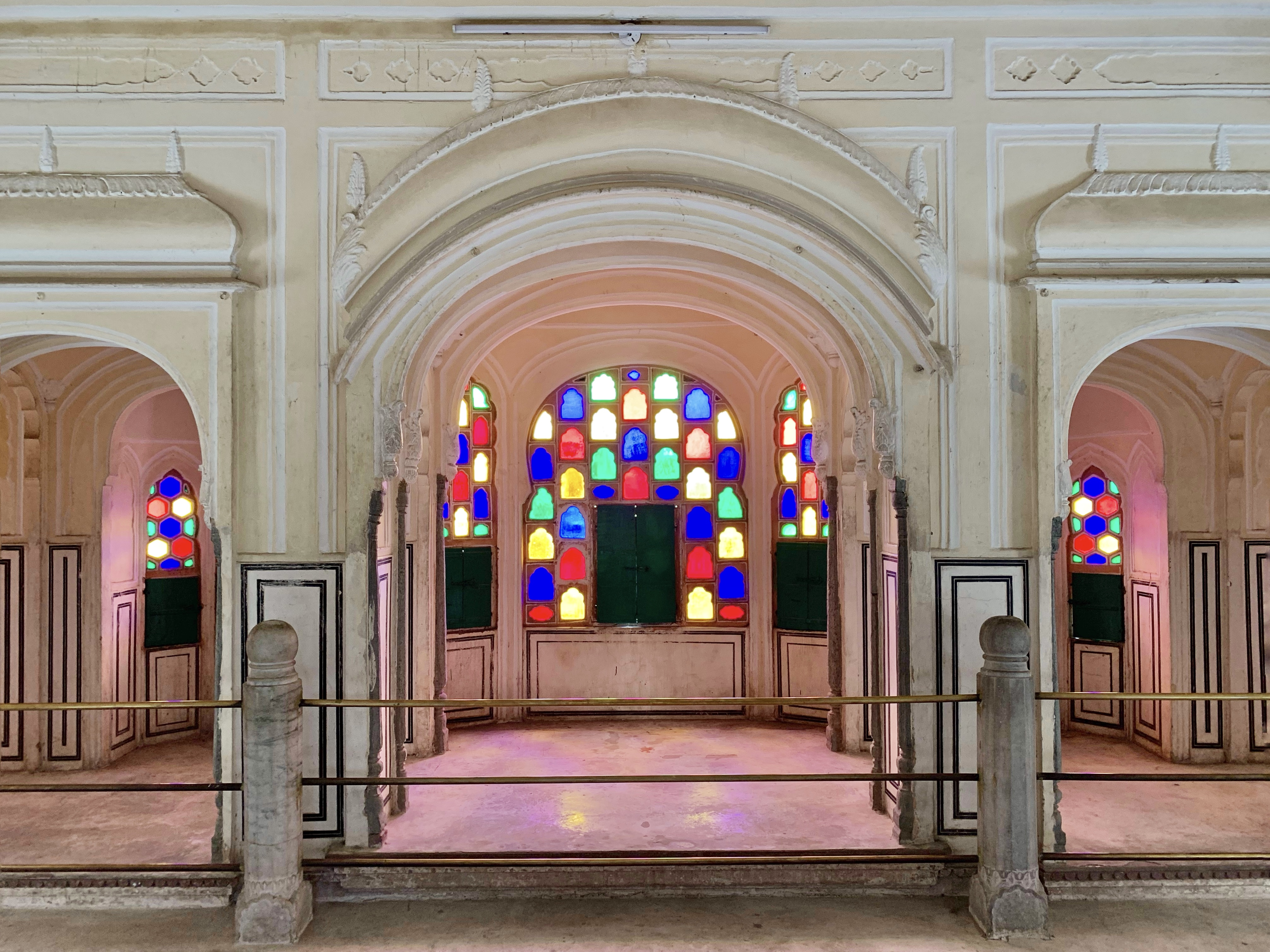
Coloured glasswork. When the sunlight enters, the entire chamber fills with the spectrum of various colours.

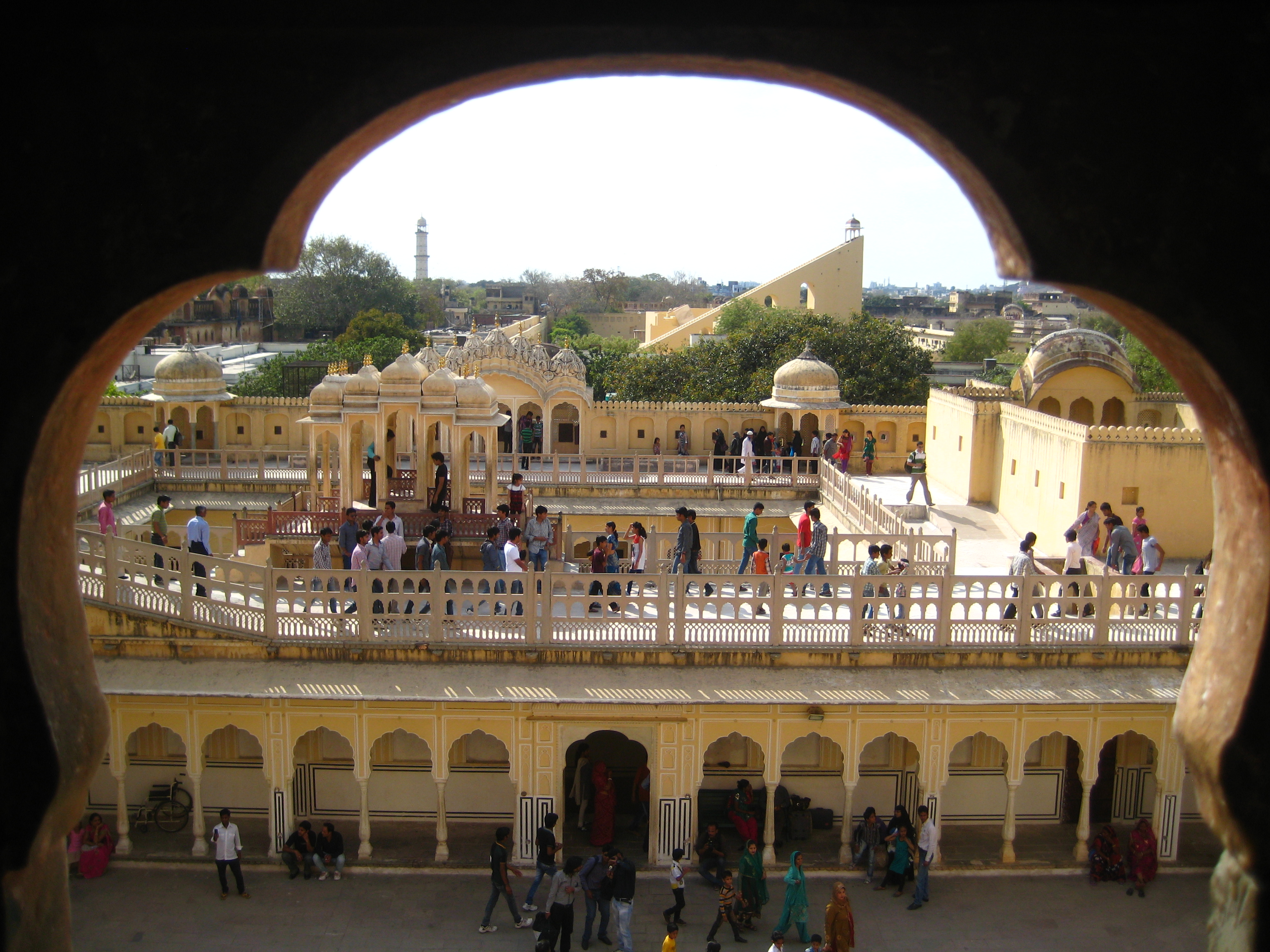
View from the back part towards Samrat Yantra of Jantar Mantar in this photo at the top right corner in the form of an inclined wall. Isarlat is also visible in this photo at left top corner as a large tower.

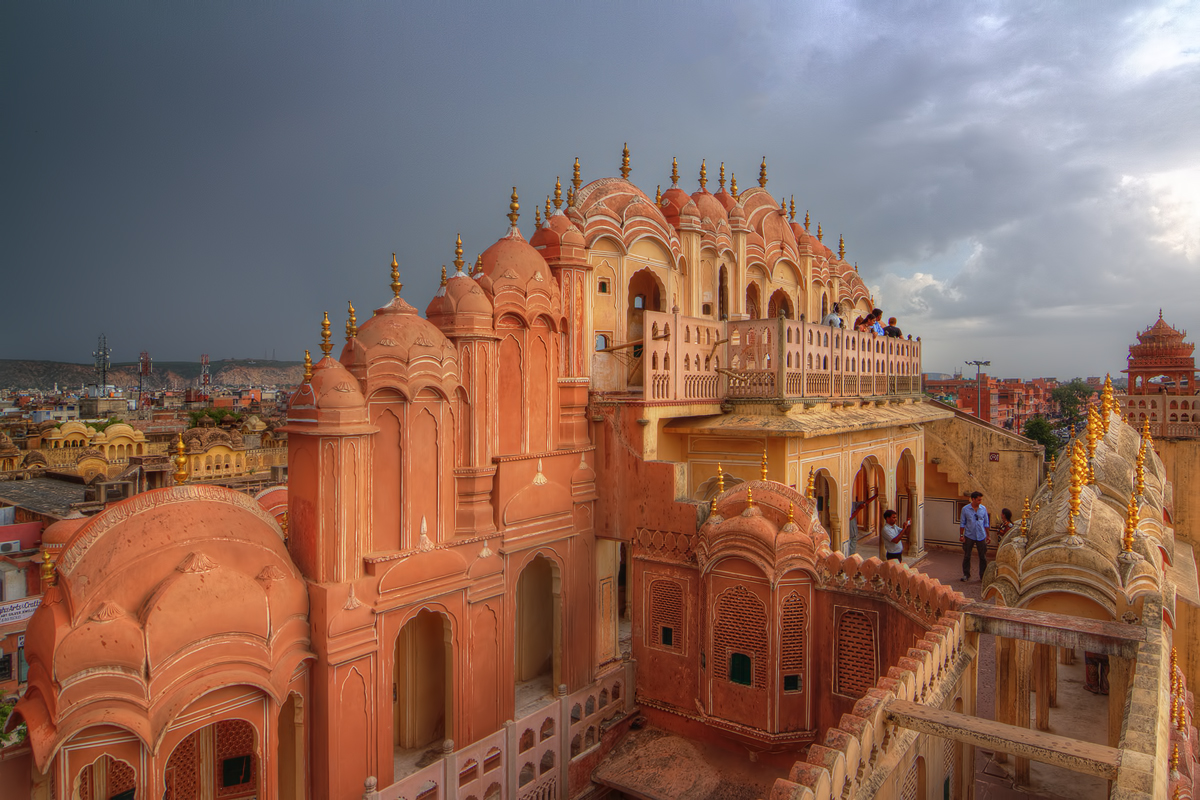
Top eastern side on a stormy afternoon

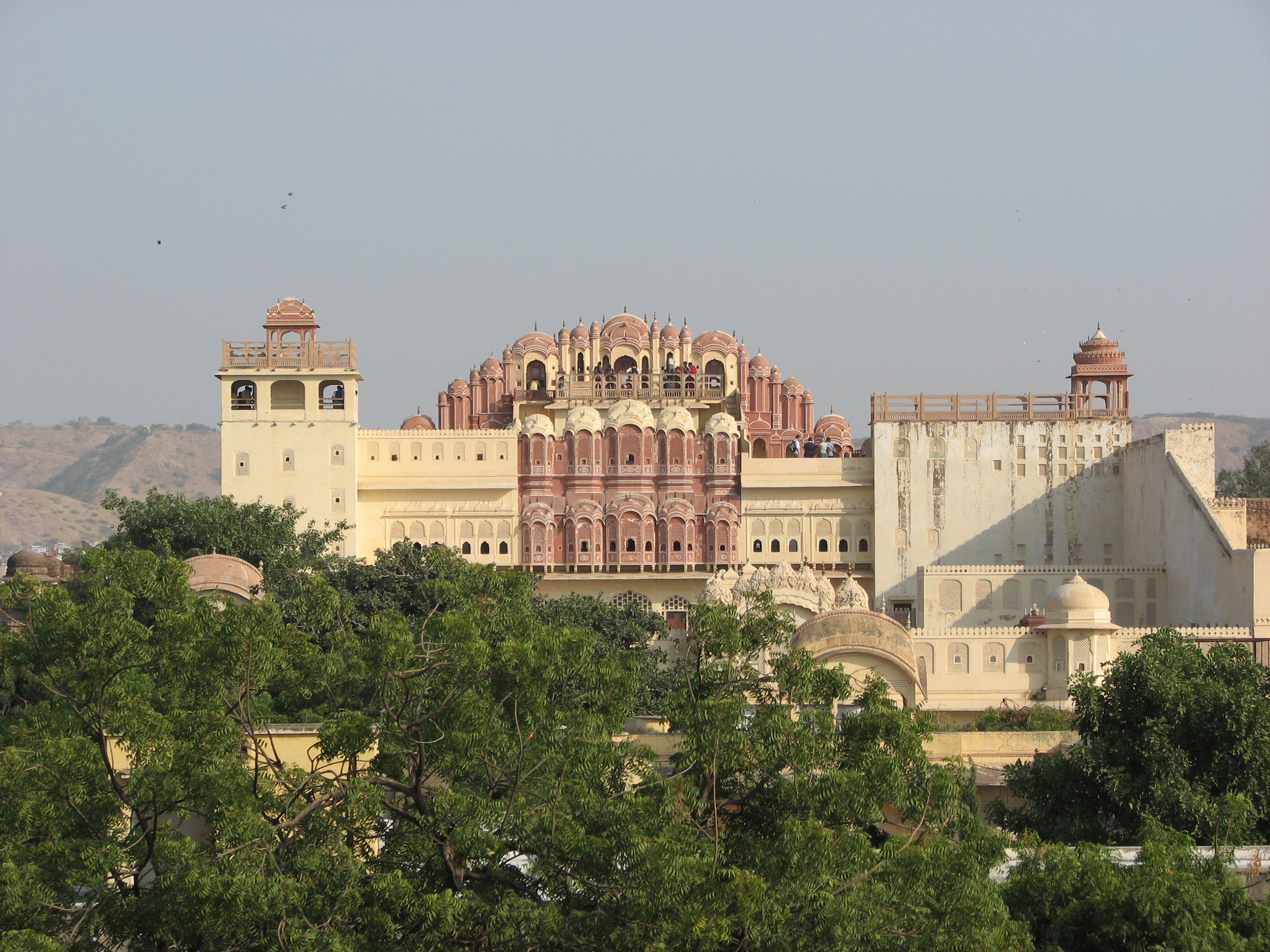
Rear view of the Hawa Mahal

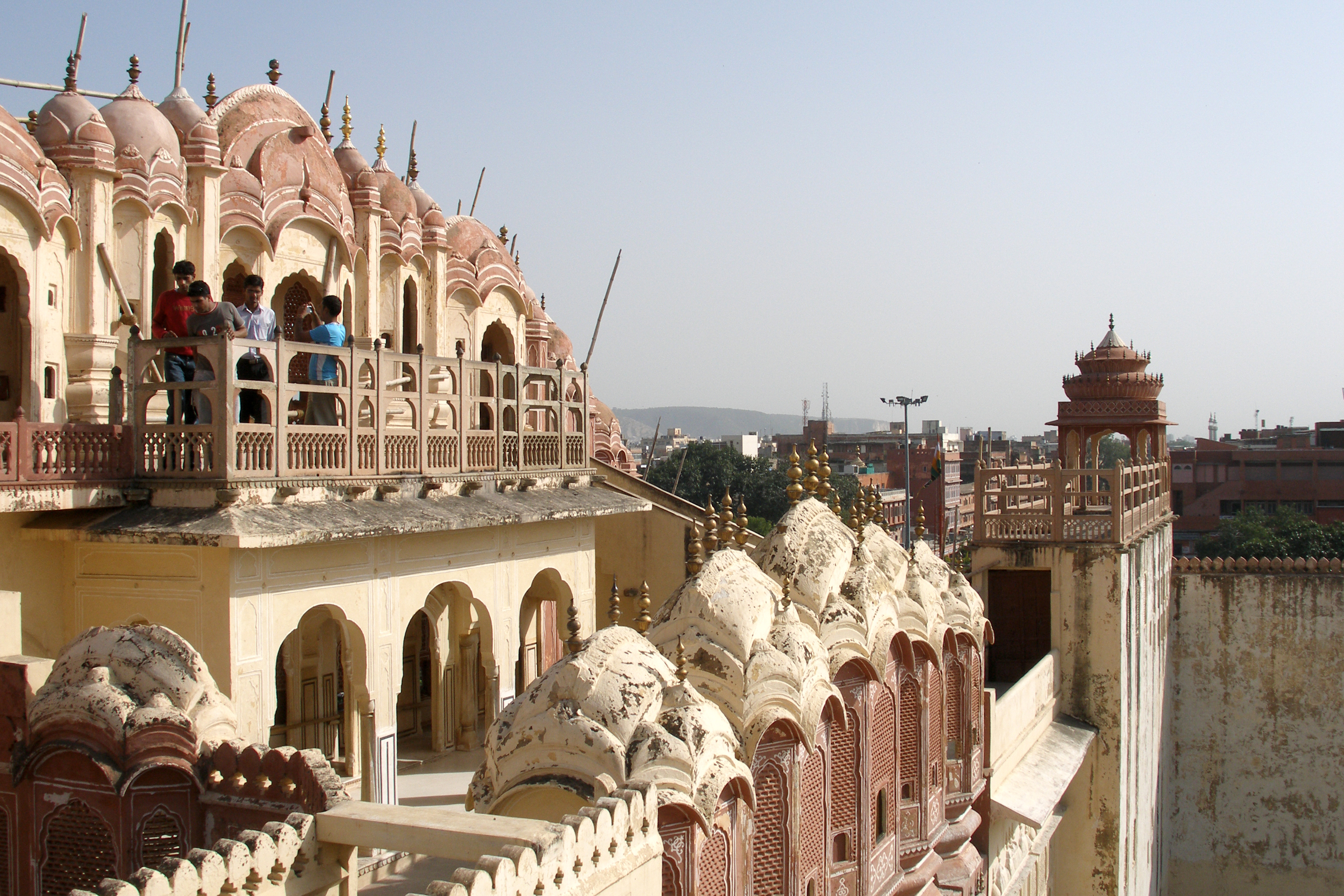
Details of eastern wall

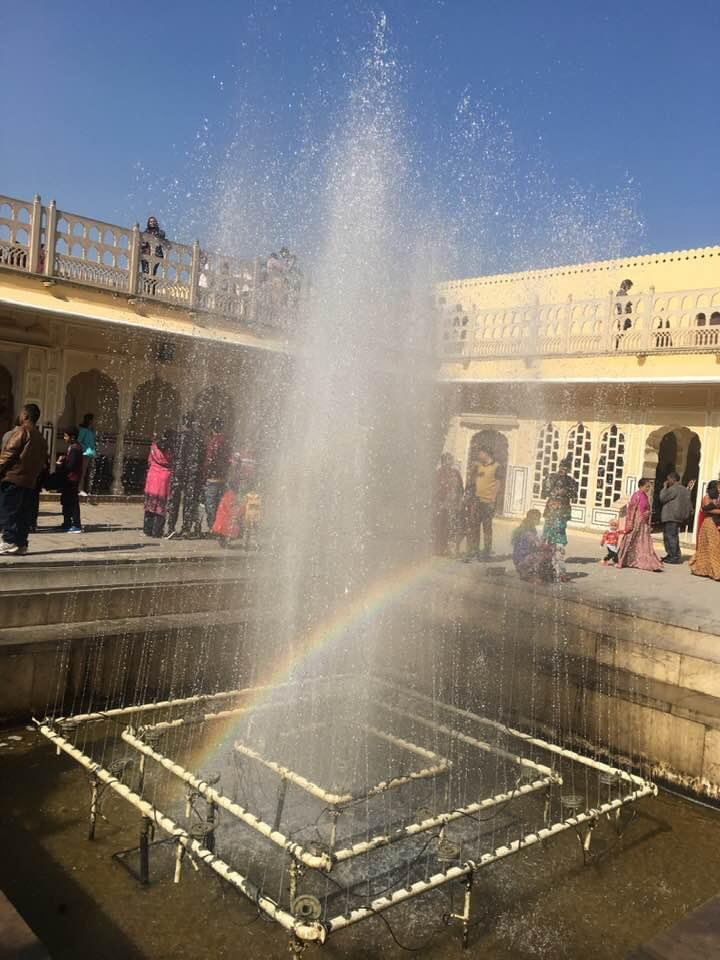
Fountain inside Hawa Mahal

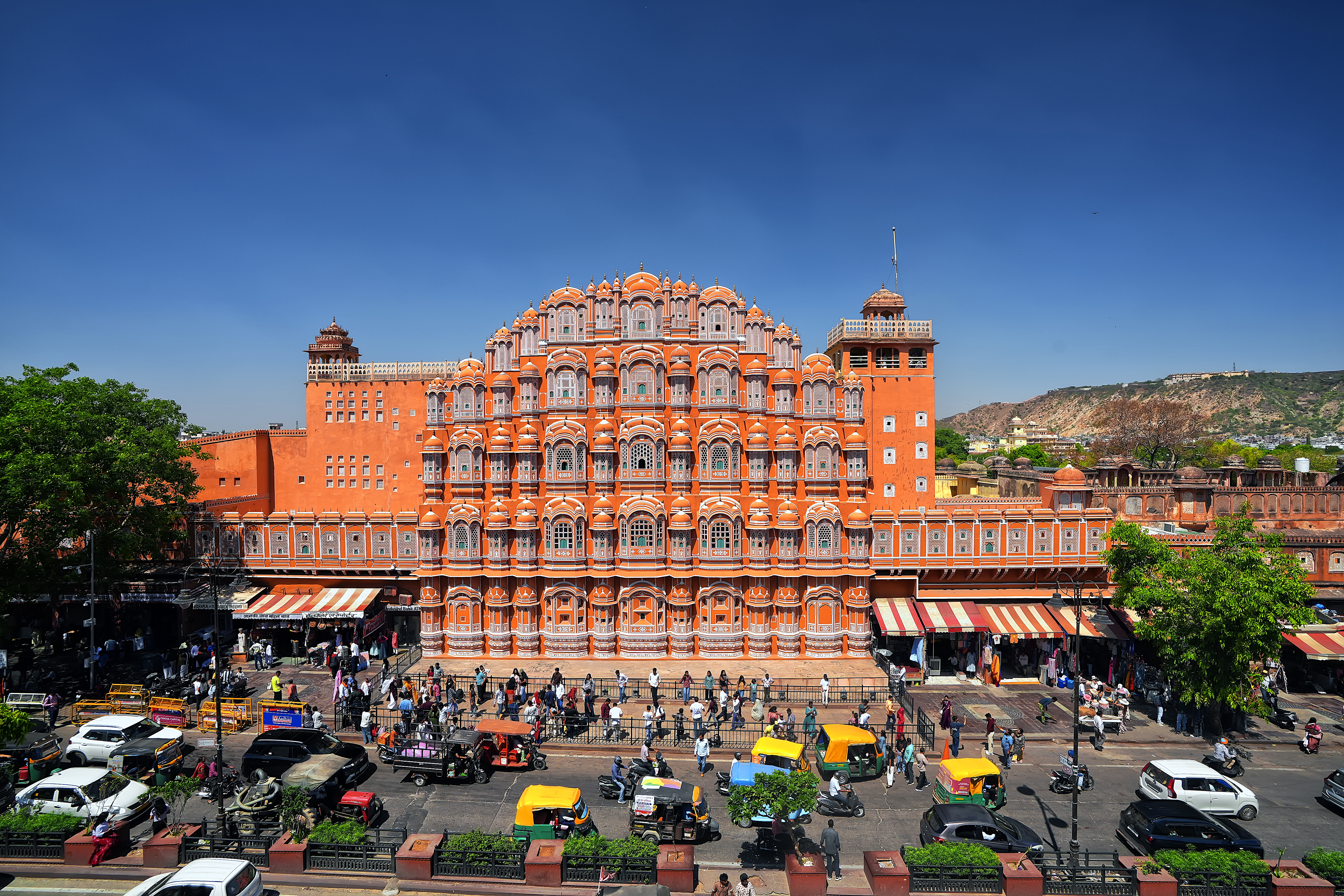
The Hawa Mahal in 2026

== See also ==
- Rajasthan
- Rajput architecture
