= List of Jaipur Metro stations =

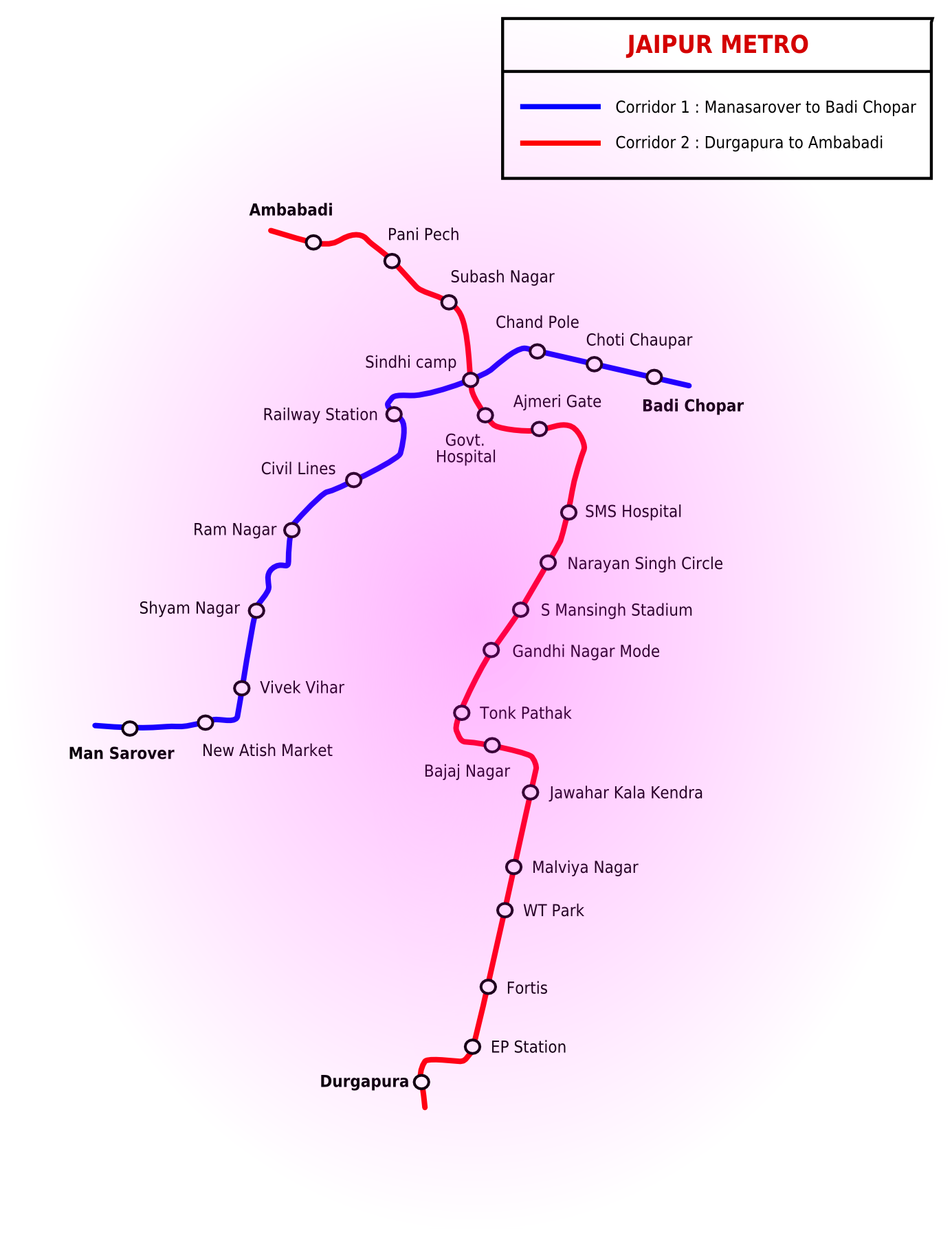
Map of Jaipur Metro

This is a list of all stations of the Jaipur Metro, a rapid transit system serving Jaipur of India.

Jaipur Metro is the sixth transit system in India, after Kolkata Metro, Delhi Metro, Namma Metro, Rapid Metro Gurgaon, and Mumbai Metro. It is built and operated by the Jaipur Metro Rail Corporation Limited (JMRC). Its first and currently only section opened on June 3, 2015, with the Pink Line. As of September 2020, Jaipur Metro had 11 metro stations, with a total route length of 11.68 kilometres (7.26 mi).

== Metro stations ==
†	Terminal station
*	Future transfer station
††	Transfer station to Indian Railways

Station name		Line	Opened	Layout	Notes	Refs
English	Rajasthani	Line	Opened	Layout	Notes	Refs
Badi Chaupar†	बड़ी चौपड़	Pink Line	23 September 2020	Underground	None	
Chandpole	चांदपोल	Pink Line	3 June 2015	Underground	None	
Chhoti Chaupar	छोटी चौपड़	Pink Line	23 September 2020	Underground	None	
Civil Lines	सिविल लाइन्स	Pink Line	3 June 2015	Elevated	None	
Mansarovar†	मानसरोवर	Pink Line	3 June 2015	Elevated	None	
New Aatish Market	नया आतिश मार्केट	Pink Line	3 June 2015	Elevated	None	
Railway Station††	रेलवे स्टेशन	Pink Line	3 June 2015	Elevated	Transfer to Jaipur Junction railway station	
Ram Nagar	राम नगर	Pink Line	3 June 2015	Elevated	None	
Sindhi Camp*	सिन्धी कैंप	Pink Line	3 June 2015	Elevated	None	
Shyam Nagar	श्याम नगर	Pink Line	3 June 2015	Elevated	None	
Vivek Vihar	विवेक विहार	Pink Line	3 June 2015	Elevated	None	

== Statistics ==
Total number of metro stations	11
Number of interchange stations	0
Number of elevated stations	8
Number of underground stations	3
Number of stations at-grade	0

== See also ==
- List of Ahmedabad Metro stations
- List of Chennai Metro stations
- List of Coimbatore Metro stations
- List of Delhi Metro stations
- List of Hyderabad Metro stations
- List of Kochi Metro stations
- List of Kolkata Metro stations
- List of Lucknow Metro stations
- List of Madurai Metro stations
- List of Mumbai Metro stations
- List of Noida Metro stations
- List of Nagpur Metro stations
- List of Namma Metro stations
- List of Navi Mumbai Metro Stations
- List of Pune Metro stations
- List of Surat Metro stations
