= Sindhi Camp =

Bus terminal in Jaipur, India

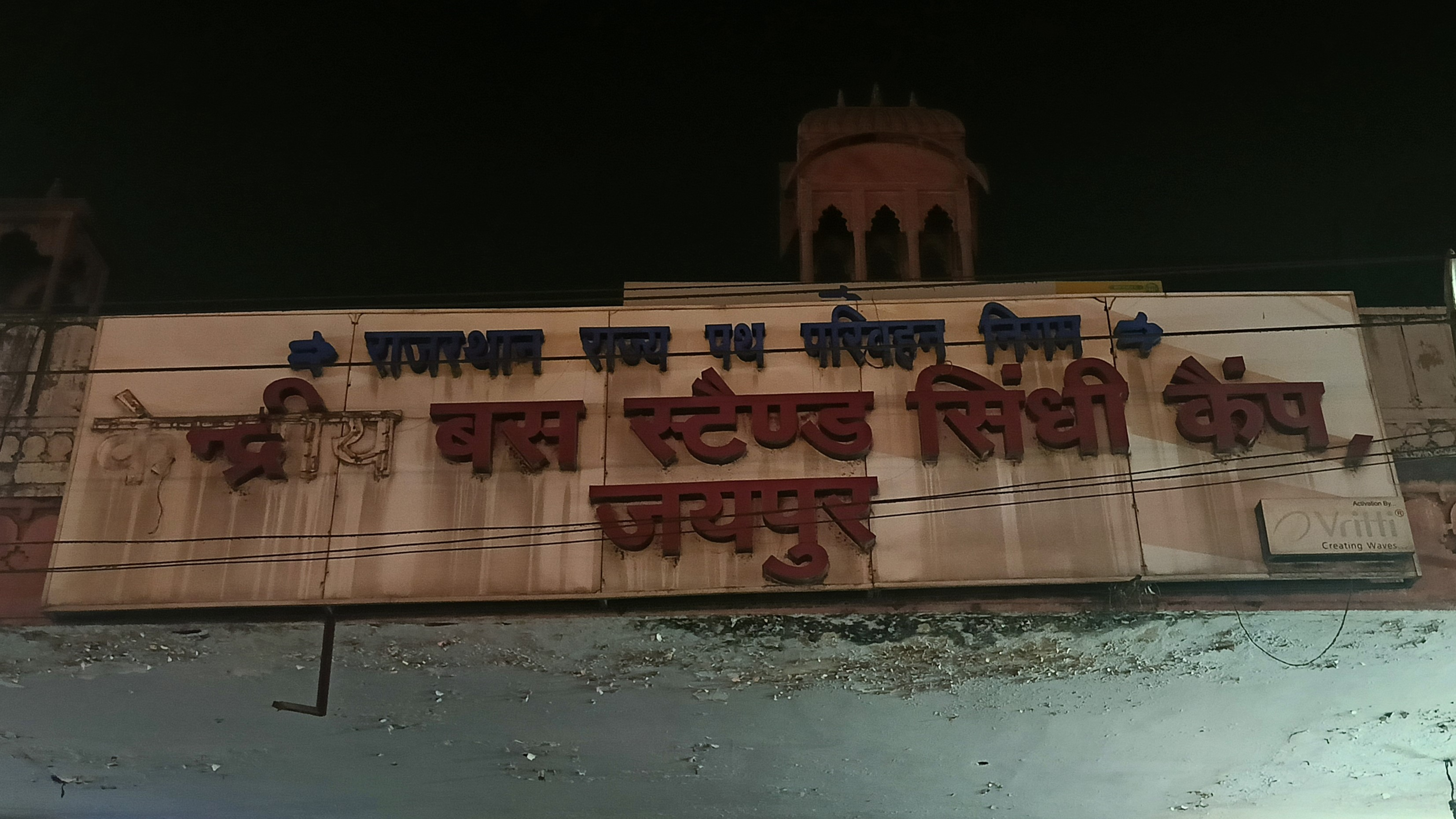
Sign board at Sindhi Camp

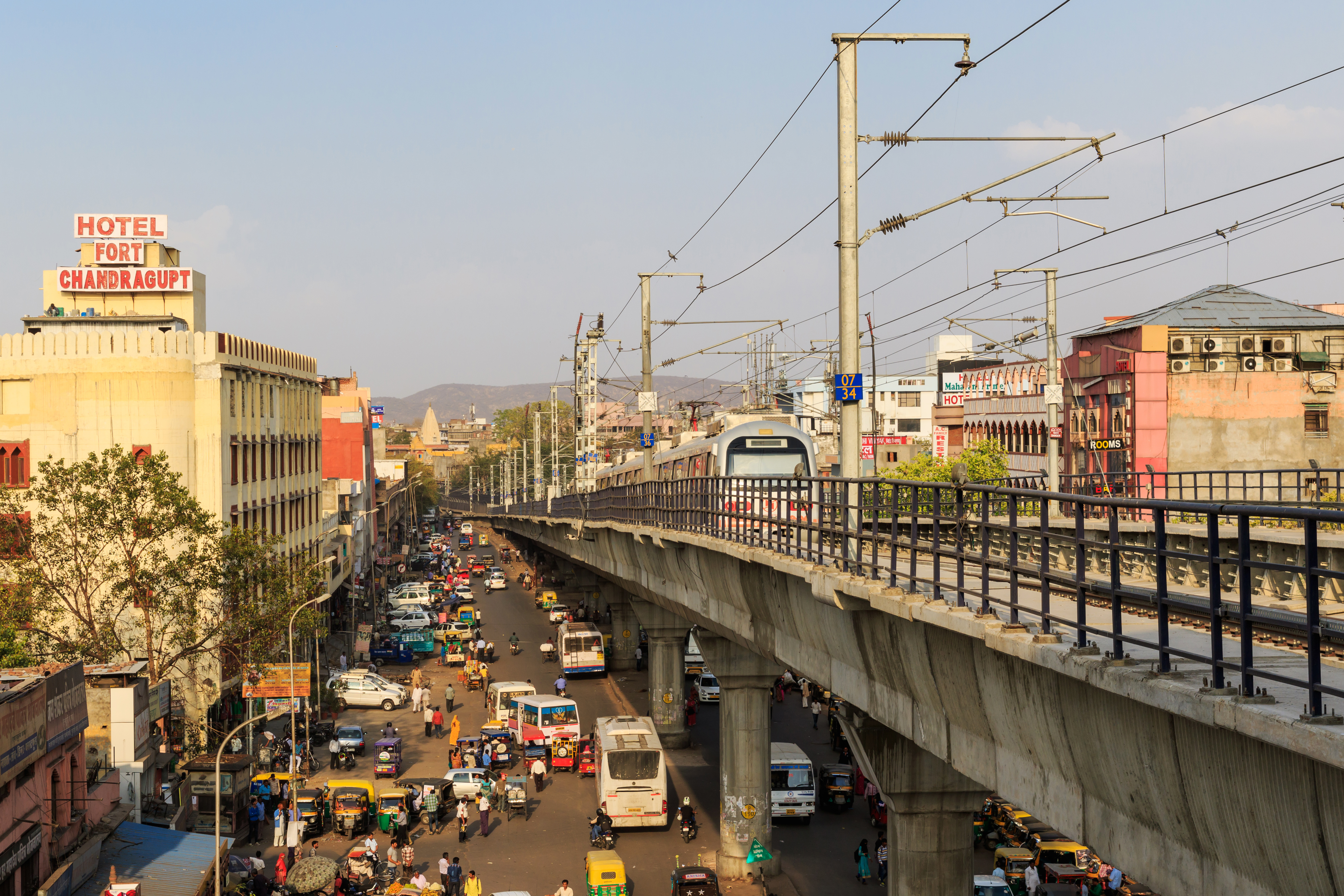
View from the Sindhi Camp metro station

Sindhi Camp is the inter-state bus terminal of Jaipur city in India. It is located along Station Road in Jaipur. It is Central Bus stand for Rajasthan State Road Transport Corporation (RSRTC). Buses are available for Rajasthan, Delhi, Haryana, Uttar Pradesh, Uttarakhand, Gujarat, Tonk, Malpura, Banswara, Bhilwara, Kota, Baran, Jhalawar, and various other locations.
