= Badi Chaupar =

Public square in Jaipur, India

Coordinates: 26.9239846°N 75.8271381°E

Badi Chaupar बड़ी चौपड़ Manak Chowk
- Public square
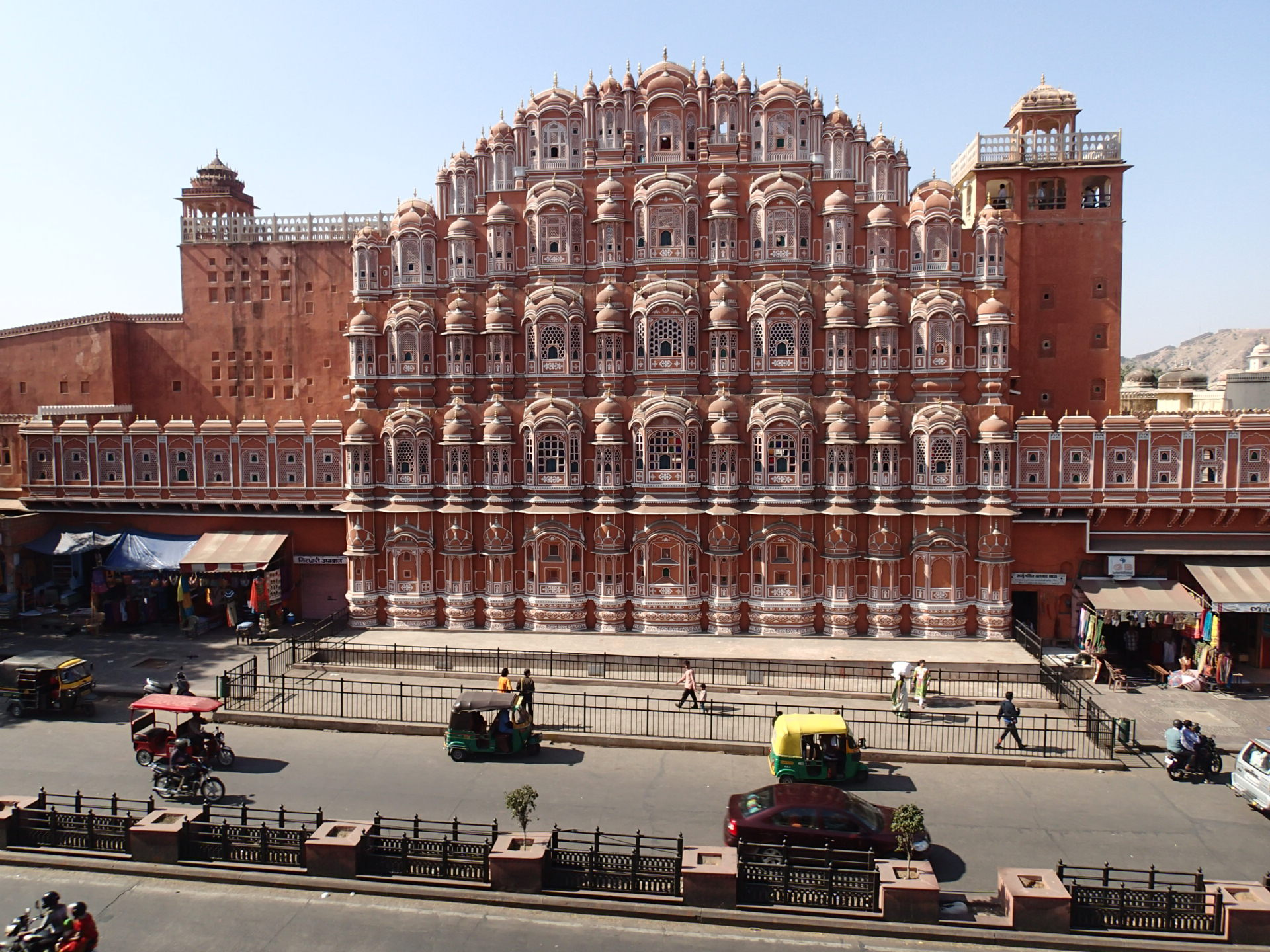
- Interactive map of Badi Chaupar
- Country: India
- State: Rajasthan
- City: Jaipur

Badi Chaupar (literally "Large Square"), also known as Manak Chowk, is a public square in Jaipur, India. It is one of the two major squares constructed by the King of Amer. The Badi Chaupar metro station is located in this area . Proposed Badi Chaupar at jaipur after Metro Construction.

Chhoti Chaupar ("small square"), also known as Amber Chowk, is another major square located nearby. Tripolia Bazar, the central bazaar (market) of Jaipur, is located between these two squares. The Badi Chaupar area is a hub of artisans, jewelers and craftsmen.
