= Mansarovar metro station =

Jaipur Metro's Pink Line terminal metro station

Mansarovar

General information
- Location: Padmavti Colony, Nirman Nagar, Jaipur, Rajasthan 302019
- Coordinates: 26°52′46″N 75°45′00″E
- System: Jaipur Metro station
- Owner: Jaipur Metro
- Operator: Jaipur Metro Rail Corporation (JMRC)
- Line: Pink Line
- Platforms: Side platform Platform-1 → Badi Chaupar; Platform-2 → Train Terminates Here
- Tracks: 2

Construction
- Structure type: Elevated, Double track
- Platform levels: 2
- Accessible: Yes

Other information
- Station code: MSOR

History
- Opened: June 3, 2015; 11 years ago
- Electrified: 25 kV 50 Hz AC through overhead catenary
- Former names: Mansarovar

Services
Preceding station	Jaipur Metro	Following station
Terminus	Pink Line	New Aatish Market towards Badi Chaupar
Route map
Location

Mansarovar is an elevated western terminal metro station on the East-West Corridor of the Pink Line of Jaipur Metro in Jaipur, India. The station was opened on 3 June 2015 and serves the Mansarovar colony..

== Station layout ==
G	Street Level	Exit/Entrance
L1	Mezzanine	Fare control, station agent, Metro Card vending machines, crossover
L2	Side platform | Doors will open on the left
L2	Platform 1 Eastbound	Towards → Badi Chaupar; Next Station: New Aatish Market
L2	Platform 2 Westbound	Towards ← Train Terminates Here
L2	Side platform | Doors will open on the left
L2

== See also ==
- Jaipur Metro
- Blue
- List of Jaipur Metro stations
- Jaipur BRTS
- List of rapid transit systems in India
- List of Metro Systems
- Rajasthan State Road Transport Corporation
