= Badi Chaupar metro station =

Jaipur Metro's Pink Line terminal metro station

Badi Chaupar
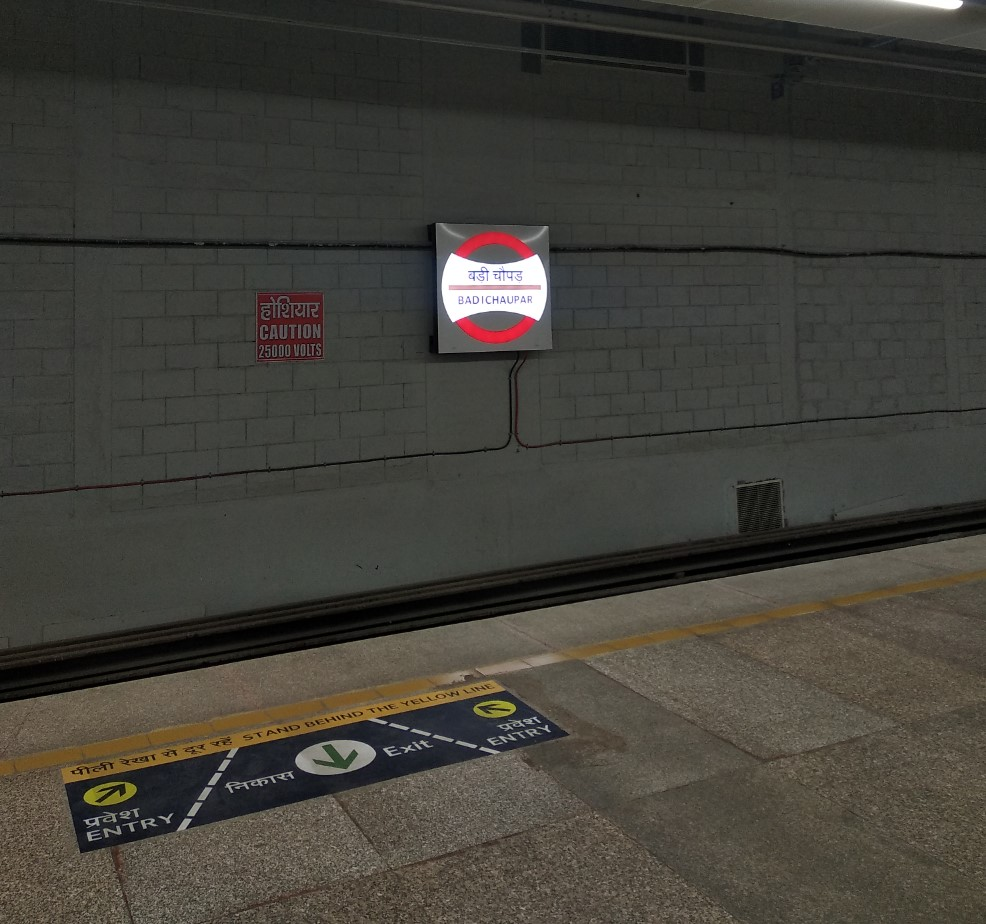

General information
- Location: Badi Chaupar, Jaipur
- Coordinates: 26.922960°N 75.826814°E
- System: Jaipur Metro station
- Owner: Jaipur Metro
- Operator: Jaipur Metro Rail Corporation (JMRC)
- Line: Pink Line
- Platforms: Island platform Platform-1 → Train Terminates Here; Platform-2 → Mansarovar
- Tracks: 2

Construction
- Structure type: Underground, Double track
- Platform levels: 2

Other information
- Station code: BICP

History
- Opened: September 23, 2020; 5 years ago
- Electrified: 25 kV 50 Hz AC through overhead catenary

Services
Preceding station	Jaipur Metro	Following station
Chhoti Chaupar towards Mansarovar	Pink Line	Terminus
Route map
Location

Badi Chaupar is an underground eastern terminal metro station on the East-West Corridor of the Pink Line of Jaipur Metro in Jaipur, India. This station was opened on 23 September 2020.

== Station layout ==
G	Street level	Exit/ Entrance
M	Mezzanine	Fare control, station agent, Ticket/token, shops
P	Platform 1 Eastbound	Towards → Train Terminates Here
P	Island platform | Doors will open on the right
P	Platform 2 Westbound	Towards ← Mansarovar; Next Station: Chhoti Chaupar

== See also ==
- Jaipur Metro
- Blue
- List of Jaipur Metro stations
- Jaipur BRTS
- List of rapid transit systems in India
- List of Metro Systems
- Rajasthan State Road Transport Corporation
