= Jaipur Metro =

Rapid transit system in the city of Jaipur, Rajasthan, India

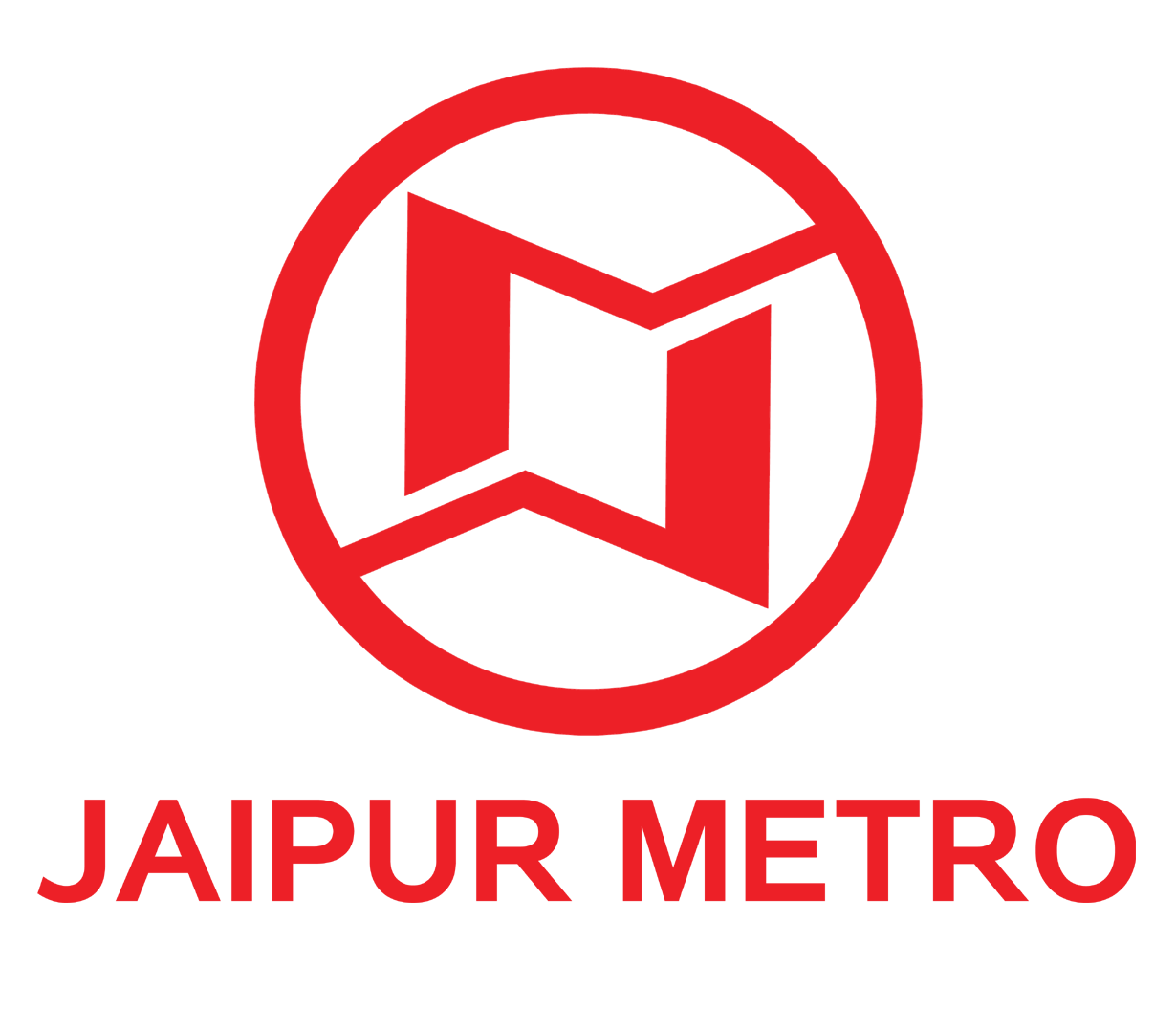

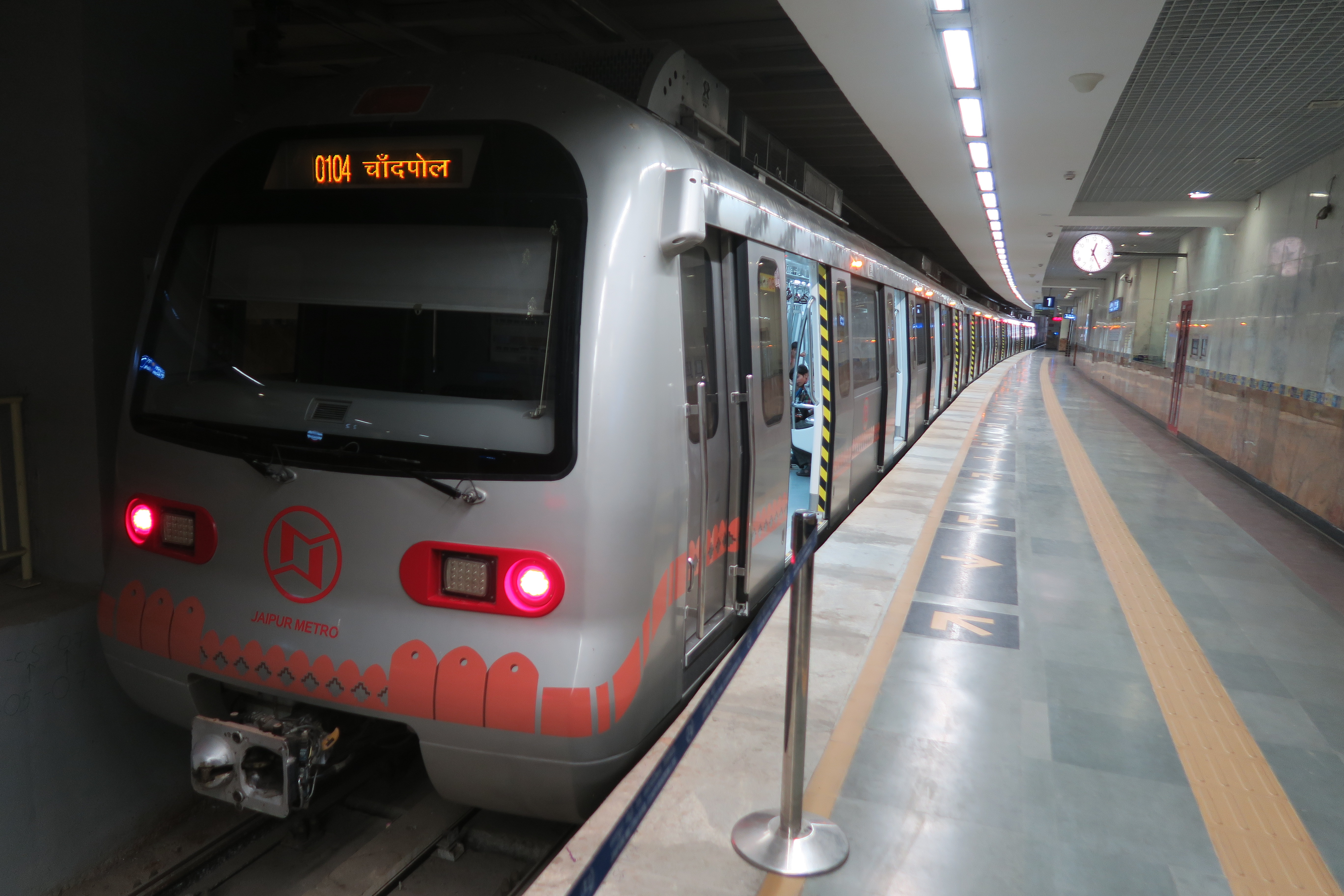
- Jaipur Metro Pink line at Chandpole station

Overview
- Owner: Jaipur Metro Rail Corporation Limited (JMRC)
- Locale: Jaipur, Rajasthan, India
- Transit type: Rapid Transit
- Number of lines: 1 (operational); 1 (planned)
- Line number: Operational: Pink Line; Approved: Orange Line
- Number of stations: 11
- Daily ridership: 55,068 (July 2024)
- Chief executive: Nihal Chand Goel, Chairman & MD
- Headquarters: Khanij Bhavan, C-Scheme, Jaipur
- Website: Jaipur Metro

Operation
- Began operation: 3 June 2015; 11 years ago
- Operator: Jaipur Metro Rail Corporation (JMRC)
- Train length: 4 coaches
- Headway: 10 minutes (peak); 15 minutes (off-peak)

Technical
- System length: 11.97 km (7.44 mi)
- Track gauge: 1,435 mm (4 ft 8 1/2 in) standard gauge
- Electrification: 25 kV 50 Hz AC from overhead catenary
- Average speed: 32 km/h (20 mph)
- Top speed: 80 km/h (50 mph)
System map
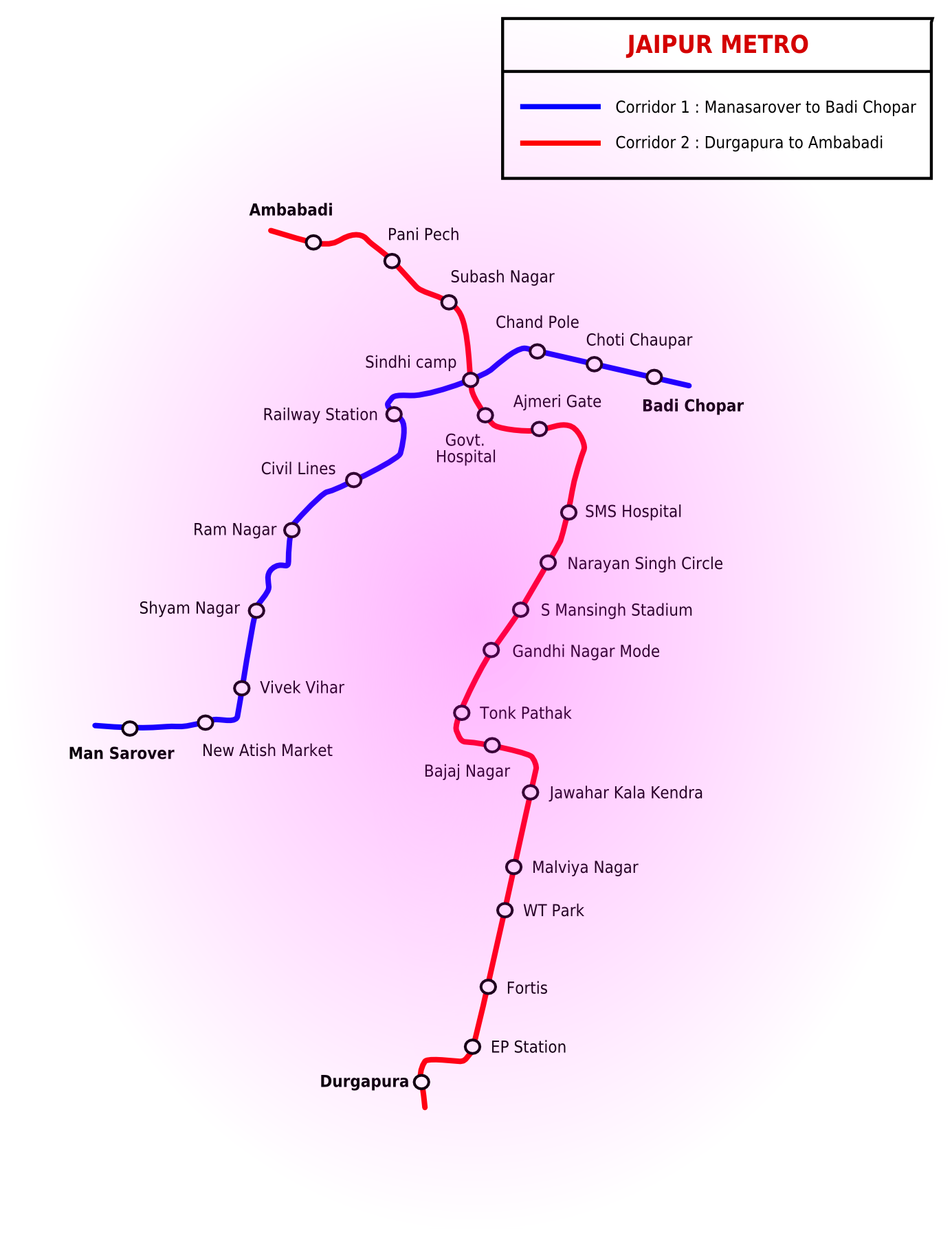

The Jaipur Metro is a rapid transit system in the city of Jaipur, Rajasthan, India. Construction on the mostly elevated part of the first line, called Phase 1A, comprising 9.63 kilometres (5.984 mi) of route from Mansarovar to Chandpole Bazaar, started in November 2010, and was completed in 2014. The Jaipur Metro began commercial service between Chandpole and Mansarovar on 3 June 2015. The Jaipur Metro is the first metro in India to run on triple-storey elevated road and metro track. Phase 1-B, from Chandpole to Badi Chaupar, began operation on 23 September 2020.

== History ==
=== JMRC Ltd. ===
The Jaipur Metro Rail Corporation Ltd., abbreviated to JMRC, is a state-owned company that operates the Jaipur Metro. The Jaipur Metro Rail Corporation Ltd. was created on 1 January 2010. Among the Rapid Transit systems of India, it has been recorded fastest to conduct of trial run after starting construction, when it commenced trial runs in Jaipur on 18 September 2013 flagged off by the then Chief Minister of Rajasthan Shri Ashok Gehlot.

== Construction Phases ==
Physical construction work on the Jaipur Metro started on 24 February 2011. JMRC consulted the DMRC on rapid transit operation and construction techniques.

The first line of the Jaipur Metro was opened to public by Vasundhara Raje, the Chief Minister of Rajasthan, on 3 June 2015, and thus, it became the sixth rapid transit system in India. Phase 1-B of the project started operating on 23 September 2020.

The Jaipur Metro is being built in 2 phases. Phase 1 consists of the Pink Line and Phase 2 consists of the Orange Line. Currently, the Orange Line is being planned. The implementation of Phase 1A of the project (Mansarover to Chandpole having the length of about 9.63 km (5.984 mi)) including the civil works, permanent way, depot and traction and power supply, etc. was being managed by DMRC. Phase I-A completed 9 stations and 9.63 kilometres (5.984 mi) of route length, of which 0.95 kilometres (0.590 mi) is underground and 9.13 kilometres (5.673 mi) is elevated.

The remainder of the first line, Phase 1-B [2.34 kilometres (1.454 mi), 2 stations], got completed by 23 September 2020. Phase 2 (23.099 kilometres (14.353 mi), 20 stations) is planned to be completed by 2021. With the completion of Phases 1 and 2, the network will span a 35.078 kilometres (21.796 mi) and 31 stations.

=== Phase 1 ===
Phase 1 of the Jaipur Metro project comprises the East–West Corridor between Mansarovar and Badi Chaupar, with a total planned length of 12.07 km. The project was divided into two sections: Phase 1A, from Mansarovar to Chandpole, and Phase 1B, from Chandpole to Badi Chaupar. The corridor was developed by Jaipur Metro Rail Corporation (JMRC), with Delhi Metro Rail Corporation (DMRC) responsible for implementing Phase 1A. The corridor is being further extended through Phase 1C, from Badi Chaupar to Transport Nagar, covering approximately 2.85 km, and Phase 1D, from Mansarovar to Ajmer Road Chauraha, covering approximately 1.35 km. Both extensions are under construction and are intended to improve connectivity across the eastern and western parts of Jaipur. The project is being developed by Jaipur Metro Rail Corporation (JMRC), with Delhi Metro Rail Corporation (DMRC) responsible for implementing Phase 1A and serving as general consultant for Phases 1C and 1D.

==== Phase 1A ====
Construction of Phase 1A began on 13 November 2010. The 9.63 km corridor between Mansarovar and Chandpole comprises 9.13 km of elevated track and 0.50 km of underground track, with eight elevated stations and one underground station. DMRC undertook the construction and associated technical consultancy work under an agreement with JMRC.

The first trial run was conducted on 18 September 2013, when then Chief Minister Ashok Gehlot flagged off a metro train from Mansarovar station. The initial trial covered approximately four kilometres between Mansarovar and Shyam Nagar.

Following testing and safety clearance from the Commissioner of Metro Rail Safety in May 2015, Phase 1A was inaugurated by Chief Minister Vasundhara Raje on 3 June 2015, marking the commencement of commercial metro operations in Jaipur.

Line	Stations	Length (km)	Terminals		No. of interchanges planned
Pink Line	9	9.630	Mansarovar	Chandpole	0

==== Phase 1B ====
The Pink Line was realized with the completion of Phase 1B (2.34 kilometres (1.454 mi), 2 stations), which got completed in September 2020. The tunnel excavation work between Chandpole and Badi Chaupar completed in August 2017, civil work to complete by October 2019. Trial running completed in January 2020. On 23 September 2020 it has been opened to public. It now completes the Pink Line. Details of the line are:

Line	Stations	Length (km)	Terminals		No. of interchanges planned
Pink Line extension	2	2.349	Chandpole	Badi Chaupar	0

==== Phase 1C ====
Phase 1C is an under-construction eastern extension of the Jaipur Metro Pink Line from Badi Chaupar to Transport Nagar. The revised corridor is approximately 3.80 km long and will extend the existing east–west metro line through the historic Walled City of Jaipur towards Delhi Road and Transport Nagar. The extension comprises underground and elevated sections, with two proposed stations: an underground station at Galta Gate and an elevated terminus at Transport Nagar. The project is intended to improve metro connectivity in eastern Jaipur and provide an extension of the existing Pink Line beyond Badi Chaupar.

Initial construction work on Phase 1C commenced in May 2024, when Afcons Infrastructure began underground construction activities under Package UG-03. The original project alignment included an underground station at Ramganj Chaupar and an elevated station at Transport Nagar. The construction works included twin underground tunnels beneath the older parts of Jaipur, along with an elevated viaduct and associated station infrastructure. The underground section was designed to allow the Pink Line to pass beneath densely developed areas of the Walled City.

In June 2026, Jaipur Metro Rail Corporation (JMRC) announced a revision to the proposed alignment, replacing the previously planned Ramganj Chaupar station with an underground station near the Galtaji crossing on Delhi Road. Under the revised plan, the corridor will remain underground from Badi Chaupar through the Walled City before transitioning to an elevated alignment beyond Galta Gate and continuing towards Transport Nagar. JMRC stated that the revision was intended to reduce surface-level construction within the historic Walled City, which forms part of a UNESCO World Heritage Site.

On 10 October 2026, underground tunnelling operations began at Galta Gate with the launch of the tunnel boring machine (TBM) Pratap. The launch was attended by Rajasthan Chief Secretary V. Srinivas. The tunnelling works form part of the underground section connecting Galta Gate with Badi Chaupar, passing beneath the historic Walled City. The construction programme also includes the underground Galta Gate station, the transition to the elevated corridor and the elevated Transport Nagar station.

The revised project has been reported to have an estimated cost of approximately ₹1,511 crore, with completion targeted for July 2028. Once completed, the extension will connect Transport Nagar and Galta Gate with the existing Pink Line stations, including Badi Chaupar, Chandpole, Sindhi Camp, Railway Station and Mansarovar, without requiring a transfer between metro lines.

Line	Stations	Length (km)	Terminals		No. of interchanges planned
Pink Line extension	2	3.412	Badi Chaupar	Transport Nagar	0

==== Phase 1D ====
Phase 1D is an under-construction western extension of the Jaipur Metro Pink Line from Mansarovar to Ajmer Road Chauraha (200 Feet Bypass). The extension is approximately 1.312 km long and consists of an entirely elevated corridor with one new station at Ajmer Road Chauraha. The project also includes a 0.357 km loop line and associated railway infrastructure. The extension is intended to improve public transport connectivity in western Jaipur and extend metro services beyond the existing Mansarovar terminus.

The project was approved at an estimated cost of ₹204.81 crore, with Jaipur Metro Rail Corporation (JMRC) responsible for its implementation on behalf of the Jaipur Development Authority (JDA). The construction contract commenced on 5 December 2023, preceding the start of major site works.

The foundation stone for the extension was laid on 15 March 2024. Construction activities were underway later that month, including site preparation and work along the existing metro corridor near Mansarovar. The project involves the construction of an elevated viaduct, station platforms, supporting structures, track infrastructure and associated facilities required for passenger operations.

Once completed, Phase 1D will extend the operational Pink Line westward from Mansarovar to Ajmer Road Chauraha, providing an additional station and improving access to the Ajmer Road corridor. The extension forms part of Jaipur Metro's wider expansion programme, which also includes Phase 1C between Badi Chaupar and Transport Nagar.

Line	Stations	Length (km)	Terminals		No. of interchanges planned
Pink Line extension	1	1.312	Mansarovar	Ajmer Road	0

Phase 1 network (including Ph 1A/B/C/D)
Line No.	Line Name	Terminals		Stations	Length	Opening Date
1	Pink Line	Mansarovar	Chandpole	9	9.63 km (5.98 mi)	June 3, 2015
1	Pink Line	Chandpole	Badi Chaupar	2	2.35 km (1.46 mi)	September 23, 2020
1	Pink Line	Badi Chaupar	Transport Nagar	2	3.41 km (2.12 mi)	April 2028
1	Pink Line	Mansarovar	Ajmer Road Chauraha	1	1.35 km (0.84 mi)	June 2027
Total				14	16.74 km (10.40 mi)	

=== Phase 2 ===
Phase 2 of the Jaipur Metro project comprises the Orange Line, a planned north–south corridor connecting Prahladpura and Todi Mod. On 8 April 2026, the Union Cabinet approved the approximately 42.8 km corridor, comprising 36 stations, at an estimated cost of ₹13,037.66 crore. The project is being implemented by Rajasthan Metro Rail Corporation Limited (RMRCL), with completion targeted for September 2031.

The Orange Line is planned to interchange with the existing Pink Line at Khasa Kothi. The interchange project includes the construction of a new elevated Khasa Kothi station on the Pink Line, modifications to the existing elevated viaduct, and a separate elevated station on the Orange Line. A foot overbridge is planned to connect the two stations, allowing passengers to transfer between the lines.

Phase 2 network
No.	Line name	Terminals		Stations	Length (km)	Status	Opening date
1	Pink Line	Khasa Kothi	Khasa Kothi	1	0	Under Construction	September 2031
2	Orange Line	Prahladpura	Todi Mod	36	42.8 km (26.6 mi)	Under Construction	September 2031
Total				37	42.8 km (26.6 mi)		

== Lines ==
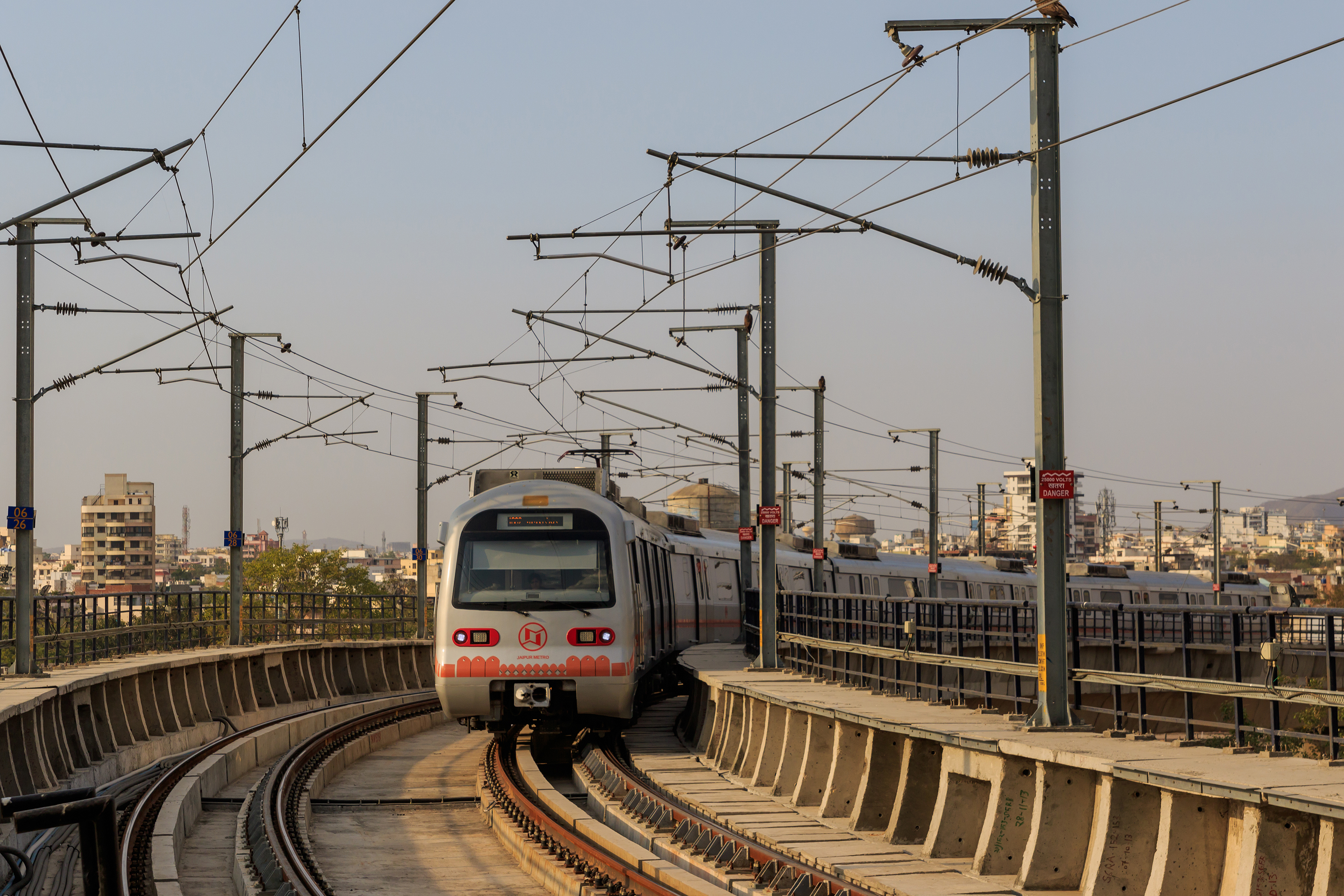
Jaipur Metro Track

=== Pink Line ===
The Pink Line is the first and currently the only operational line of Jaipur Metro, running east–west between Mansarovar and Badi Chaupar. The line is approximately 12 km long and serves 11 stations, comprising eight elevated and three underground stations. The initial section between Mansarovar and Chandpole commenced operations on 3 June 2015, while the underground extension from Chandpole to Badi Chaupar opened on 23 September 2020. The corridor connects residential and commercial areas with Jaipur's historic walled city.

=== Orange Line ===
The Orange Line is an under-construction north–south corridor of Jaipur Metro, planned to connect Prahladpura in the south with Todi Mod in the north. The 41 km line was approved by the Union Cabinet on 8 April 2026, with 36 stations, including 34 elevated and two underground stations. The corridor will serve major destinations including Jaipur International Airport, Sitapura Industrial Area, SMS Hospital, Ambabari and Vidhyadhar Nagar. It will also provide an interchange with the existing Pink Line at Khasa Kothi. The project is being implemented by Rajasthan Metro Rail Corporation Limited.

== Network ==
As of September 2020, with the completion and the beginning of operations of Phase 1, the Jaipur Metro network comprises 1 line, serving 11 metro stations and operating on a total route length of 9.63 kilometres (5.98 mi).

Jaipur Metro
Line	First operational	Last extension	Stations	Length (km)	Termini		Rolling stock	Track gauge (mm)	Power
Pink Line	3 June 2015	23 September 2020	11	11.97	Mansarovar	Badi Chaupar	10 trains	1435	25 kV OHE
	Total		11	11.97					

== Finances ==
Estimated cost of the east–west corridor of the Jaipur Metro is ₹3,149 crore (US$340 million). The state government would be directly funding ₹600 crore (US$64 million) while the rest would be borne by other wings of state urban development and housing departments. The Phase-II is expected to cost ₹6,583 crore (US$700 million) crore for which government is mulling over PPP mode.

== Operations ==
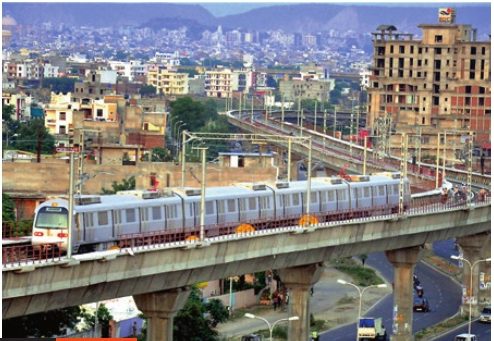
Jaipur Metro track over the city.

A concession for operation and maintenance of the Stage 1 and Stage 2 is to be let on PPP basis.

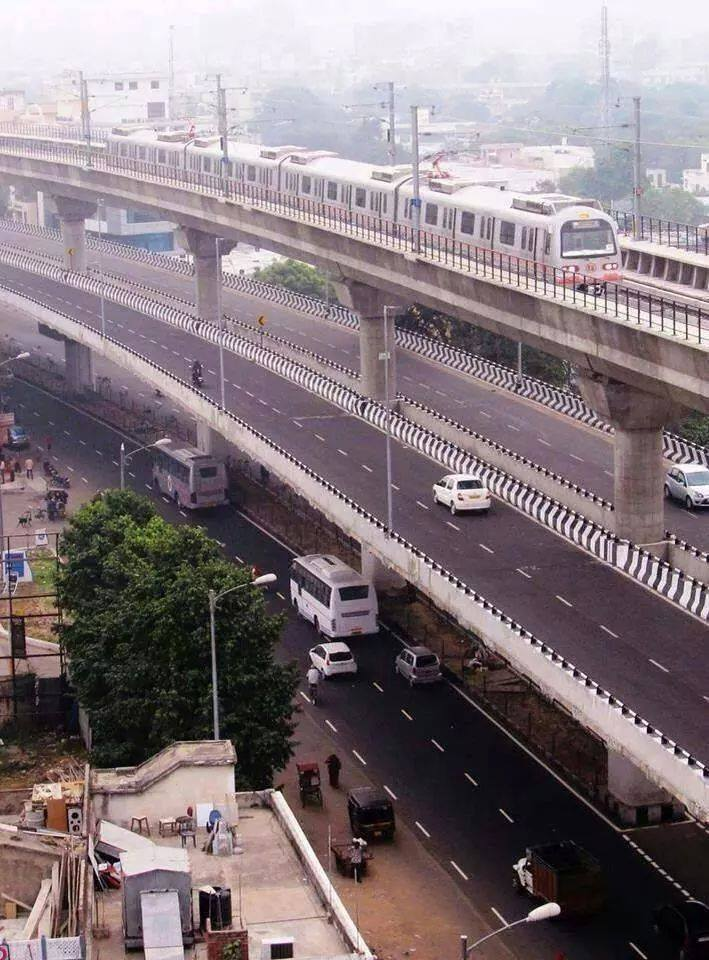
Jaipur Metro running on double-storey elevated track

Trains operate at a frequency of 10 to 15 minutes between 5:30 and 22:30 depending peak and off-peak time. Trains operating within the network typically travel at speed up to 40 km/h (25 mph), and stop for about 20–40 seconds at each station. Automated station announcements are recorded in Hindi and English. Many stations have services such as Parking lot, ATMs and mobile recharge. The metro also has a sophisticated fire alarm system for advance warning in emergencies, and fire retardant material is used in trains as well as on the premises of stations. Navigation information will sooner be available on Google Transit. The first coach of every train is reserved for women during peak hours.

=== Security ===
The responsibility of security of Jaipur Metro has been entrusted to Rajasthan Police. A strength of 789 police personnel has been sanctioned for security and policing of Jaipur Metro. Latest security equipments have been provided at all Metro Stations. Closed-circuit cameras from IndigoVision are used to monitor trains and stations, and feed from these is monitored by Rajasthan Police and Jaipur Metro authorities at their respective control rooms. In addition metal detectors, X-ray baggage inspection systems, and dog squads are also deployed which are used to secure the system. Each of the underground stations has about 45 to 50 cameras installed while the elevated stations have about 16 to 20 cameras each. The monitoring of these cameras is done by the Rajasthan Police, which is in charge of security of the Metro, as well as the Jaipur Metro Rail Corporation. Intercoms are provided in each train car for emergency communication between the passengers and the train operator. Periodic security drills are carried out at stations and on trains to ensure preparedness of security agencies in emergency situations.

=== Ticketing & Recharge ===
For the convenience of customers, Jaipur Metro commuters have three choices for ticket purchase. The RFID tokens are valid only for a single journey on the day of purchase and the value depends on the distance travelled, with fares for a single journey ranging from ₹10 (11¢ US) to ₹30 (32¢ US). Fares are calculated based on the origin and destination stations using a fare chart and it also depends on peak rush in Metro. Travel cards are available for longer durations and are most convenient for frequent commuters. They are valid for three years from the date of purchase or the date of last recharge, and are available in denominations of ₹100 (US$1.10) to ₹1,000 (US$11). 10%-15% discount is given on travels made on it depending on actual fare. A deposit of ₹50 (53¢ US) needs to be made to buy a new card which is refundable on the return of the card any time before its expiry if the card is not physically damaged. Tourist cards can be used for unlimited travel on the Jaipur Metro network over short periods of time. There are two kinds of tourist cards valid for one and three days respectively. The cost of a one-day card is ₹50 (53¢ US) and that of a three-day card is ₹150 (US$1.60), besides a refundable deposit of ₹50 (53¢ US) that must be paid at the time of purchasing the card. Jaipur Metro also has introduced a Combo Card. JMRC has already entered into a MoU with HDFC Bank and accordingly co-branded Combo Cards will be issued by HDFC Bank which will be used on Jaipur Metro system just like Daily Commuter Smart Cards issued by Jaipur Metro.

== Rolling stock ==
The Metro uses 1,435 mm (4 ft 8 1/2 in) standard gauge rolling stock. Trains are maintained at Mansarovar Deport for Pink Line. In December 2011 BEML was awarded a ₹318 crore (US$34 million) contract to supply 10 four-car trains for Phase 1. The Jaipur Metro plans to lengthen the trains later to 6 coaches as the traffic increases. BEML expects a follow-on order worth ₹60 crore (US$6.4 million)

Thus these rolling stocks are said to be indigenous and are manufactured by BEML at its factory in Bangalore. The trains are four-car consists with a capacity of 1506 commuters per train, accommodating 50 seated and 292 standing passengers in each coach. These trains will have CCTV cameras in and outside the coaches, power supply connections inside coaches to charge mobiles and laptops, humidity control, microprocessor-controlled disc brakes, and will be capable of maintaining an average speed of 32 km/h (20 mph) over a distance of 1.1 km (0.68 mi).

Trains on the metro operate at a maximum speed of 80 km/h (50 mph), and an average speed of 32 km/h (20 mph). Maximum speed is limited to 42 km/h (26 mph) at curves.

The Rolling Stock used on this line is similar to the Rolling stock on the Violet and Green Lines on Delhi Metro

== Signalling and Telecommunication ==
The Jaipur Metro uses cab signalling along with a centralised automatic train control system consisting of Automatic Train Protection and automatic train signalling modules. Jaipur Metro has proposed that it will have automatic train operation also in future. A 380 MHz digital trunked TETRA radio communication system from Cassidian is used on all lines to carry both voice and data information. An integrated system comprising optical fibre cable, on-train radio, CCTV, and a centralised clock and public address system is used for telecommunication during train operations as well as emergencies.

== Artwork ==
Jaipur Metro has been decorated by the artwork of heritage wall of Jaipur inside and outside of the Metro. Metro stations also have the same kind of artwork.

== Controversies ==
On 10 March 2011, the Rajasthan High Court issued show cause notices to state authorities, JMRC, and JDA's land acquisition officer, on petition by some shop owners from Station Road, asking them to justify the Jaipur Metro Project, as petitioners alleged no proper survey was done before construction of the Pink Line began.

There were some accidents at the Metro project site, injuring laborers and passers-by, attracting criticism for lack of security measures. In one incident, an 18-foot-long (5.5 m) wall collapsed, killing two men. A case was registered against the firm DSC Limited which was involved in construction. There were reports of heightened fears among people that sub-letting of the work by the major contractors could be compromising the safety standards.

Phase I-B is also not in accordance with Jaipur's archaeological laws, which states that any kind of digging/tunneling work in the vicinity of heritage sites is not allowed. According to the archaeological laws, whoever destroys, injures, mutilates, defaces, alters, removes, disperses, misuses, imperils or allows to fall into decay a protected monument, or removes from a protected monument any sculpture, carving image, bas-relief, inscription or other like object, shall be punishable with imprisonment for a term which may extend to six months with a fine which may extend to five thousand rupees or with both.

The project also caused huge losses of business activities of shopkeepers, as the city's market will remain either closed or operative in barricades only.

== See also ==
- Urban rail transit in India
- List of Jaipur Metro stations
- Jaipur BRTS
- List of Metro Systems
