= Orange Line (Jaipur Metro) =

Under construction transit line in Jaipur, Rajasthan, India

Overview
- Status: Under-construction
- Owner: Rajasthan Metro Rail Corporation Ltd.
- Locale: Jaipur, Rajasthan, India
- Termini: Todi Mod (North); Prahaladpura (South)
- Stations: 35

Service
- Type: Rapid Transit
- System: Jaipur Metro

History
- Planned opening: September 2031; 4 years' time (TBC)

Technical
- Line length: 41 km (25 mi)
- Character: Elevated & Underground
- Track gauge: 1,435 mm (4 ft 8 1/2 in) standard gauge
- Electrification: 25 kV 50 Hz AC from overhead catenary

The Orange Line of the Jaipur Metro is an approved rapid transit line for the city of Jaipur, India. It will connect Prahaladpura in South to Todi Mod in North. It will be 41 km (25 mi) in length and will have 35 stations - 2 underground and 33 elevated, connecting important areas like Jaipur International Airport, Gandhinagar railway station, Sitapura Industrial Area, etc.

== List of stations ==
Orange Line
#	Station Name		Connections	Layout
#	English	Hindi	Connections	Layout
1	Todi Mod	टोडी मोड़	None	Elevated
2	Harmada Ghati	हरमाड़ा घाटी	None	Elevated
3	Harmada	हरमाड़ा	None	Elevated
4	VKIA (Road No.14)	वीकेआईए (रोड नं. 14)	None	Elevated
5	VKIA (Road No. 9)	वीकेआईए (रोड नं. 9)	None	Elevated
6	VKIA (Road No. 5)	वीकेआईए (रोड नं. 5)	None	Elevated
7	Vidhyadhar Nagar	विद्याधर नगर	None	Elevated
8	Vidhyadhar Nagar Sector-2	विद्याधर नगर सेक्टर-2	None	Elevated
9	Chomu Puliya	चौंमू पुलिया	None	Elevated
10	Ambabari	अंबाबाड़ी	None	Elevated
11	Pani Pech	पानीपेच	None	Elevated
12	Collectorate	कलेक्ट्रेट	None	Elevated
13	Khasa Kothi	ख़ासा कोठी	Pink Line	Elevated
14	Government Hostel	गवर्नमेंट हॉस्टल	None	Elevated
15	Ashok Marg	अशोक मार्ग	None	Elevated
16	SMS Hospital	एसएमएस अस्पताल	None	Elevated
17	Narayan Singh Circle	नारायण सिंह सर्किल	None	Elevated
18	Rambagh Circle	रामबाग सर्किल	None	Elevated
19	Nehru Place	नेहरु पैलेस	None	Elevated
20	Gandhinagar Station	गांधीनगर स्टेशन	Gandhinagar Jaipur	Elevated
21	Gopalpura	गोपालपुरा	None	Elevated
22	Durgapura	दुर्गापुरा	None	Elevated
23	B-2 Bypass Circle	बी-2 बाईपास सर्किल	None	Underground
24	Jaipur Airport	जयपुर एयरपोर्ट	Jaipur International Airport	Underground
25	Sanganer PS	सांगानेर पुलिस थाना	None	Underground
26	Pinjarapol Gaushala	पिंजरापोल गौशाला	None	Elevated
27	Haldighati Gate	हल्दीघाटी गेट	None	Elevated
28	Kumbha Marg	कुंभा मार्ग	None	Elevated
29	JECC	जेईसीसी	None	Elevated
30	Sitapura	सीतापुरा	None	Elevated
31	Goner Mod	गोनेर मोड़	None	Elevated
32	Beelwa	बीलवा	None	Elevated
33	Beelwa Kalan	बीलवा कलां	None	Elevated
34	Manpura	मानपुरा	None	Elevated
35	Prahaladpura	प्रहलादपुरा	None	Elevated

== See also ==
- Jaipur Metro
- Pink Line
- List of Jaipur Metro stations
- Jaipur BRTS
- List of rapid transit systems in India
