= Jaipur Bus Rapid Transit System =

Jaipur BRTS

Overview
- Locale: Jaipur, Rajasthan, India
- Transit type: Bus rapid transit
- Number of lines: 1
- Number of stations: 10

Technical
- System length: 7.1 kilometres (4.4 mi)

Jaipur BRTS is a bus rapid transit system, proposed to solve the traffic problem in the city of Jaipur.

In recent Rajasthan State elections, INC came into power and announced to remove Jaipur BRTS Corridors because of the accidents happening due to BRTS Corridor. Instead of BRTS, the Jaipur Development Authority had planned to build a MetroNeo on the existing BRTS corridor.

== Overview ==
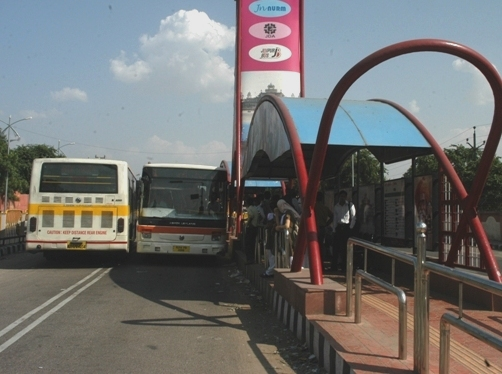
A bus stop of Jaipur BRTS

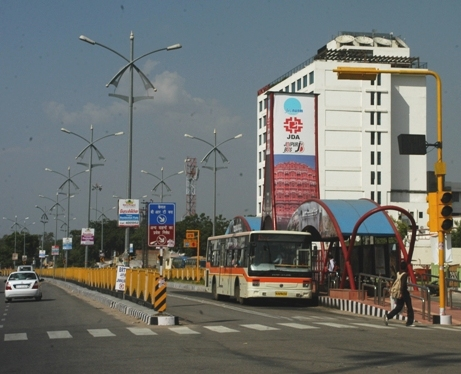
Jaipur BRTS

In August 2006, the Jaipur Bus Rapid Transit Service was approved by the Indian government for implementation. The responsibility for managing Jaipur BRTS was given to JCSTL, a special purpose vehicle formed by Jaipur Development Authority and Jaipur Nagar Nigam in a joint venture. The BRTS is expected to cater to city's growing traffic for next 15–20 years. In Phase I, two corridors have been proposed.

- Sikar Road to Tonk Road – North-South Corridor
- Ajmer Road to Delhi Road – East-West Corridor

A section of the North-South Corridor from C-Zone Bypass near Harmada to Pani Pech became operational in July 2010. The work on other sections of the North-South Corridor and East-West Corridor has commenced.

Jaipur BRTS has since been de-commissioned. Much of the land which was dedicated to the corridor has been merged back into the public roads on either side of the corridor.
