= Heritage City scheme (Jaipur) =

Urban development scheme in Jaipur, Rajasthan, India

The Heritage City scheme, commonly referred to in media reports as New Heritage City, Jaipur, is an urban development initiative of the Jaipur Development Authority (JDA) located on the Agra Road corridor in Rajasthan, India.

== Background ==
The historic Walled City of Jaipur was inscribed as a UNESCO World Heritage Site in 2019, recognised for its historic urban planning. The Jaipur Master Development Plan 2025 designated the Agra Road corridor as a key area for the city's eastward expansion.

== Planning and Development ==
The JDA initiated the scheme in 2022 through a notification under Section 25 of the JDA Act. The project covers an area of approximately 7.21 square kilometres and includes residential and commercial zones. Initial construction, including roads and an entrance gate, began in 2023.

== Architectural Features ==
The project's design includes architectural elements inspired by Jaipur's historic walled city, such as a grid-iron street plan, nine entrance gates, and a chaupar (public square).

== Connectivity ==
The Agra Road corridor is connected to regional highways and Bandikui Bypass, including routes linking Jaipur to the Delhi–Mumbai Expressway.

== Administration ==
The Heritage City scheme is administered by the Jaipur Development Authority (JDA).

== See also ==
- Jaipur
- Jaipur Development Authority
- City Wall of Jaipur
