= Pratap Nagar, Jaipur =

Pratap Nagar
- Suburban
- Location in Jaipur, India
- Coordinates: 26.8072°N 75.8219°E
- Country: India
- State: Rajasthan
- District: Jaipur
- Metro: Pratap Nagar

Languages
  - Official: Hindi
- Time zone: UTC+5:30 (IST)
- PIN: 302 033
- Planning agency: Jaipur Development Authority

Pratap Nagar is one of the largest residential areas in Jaipur, India. It is located on NH 12 (locally known as Tonk Road). It is one of the fastest-growing areas in Jaipur.

It is 8 km away from Jaipur International Airport and 7 km away from nearest railway station (Jagatpura railway station). Pratap Nagar is an area of interest for Rajasthan Housing Board and JDA (Jaipur Development Authority) for constructions and development.

== Health ==
- Narayana Hrudayalaya

== Education ==
=== Schools ===
- Subodh Public School
- VSI International School
