= Architecture of Rajasthan =

Architecture in the Indian state of Rajasthan

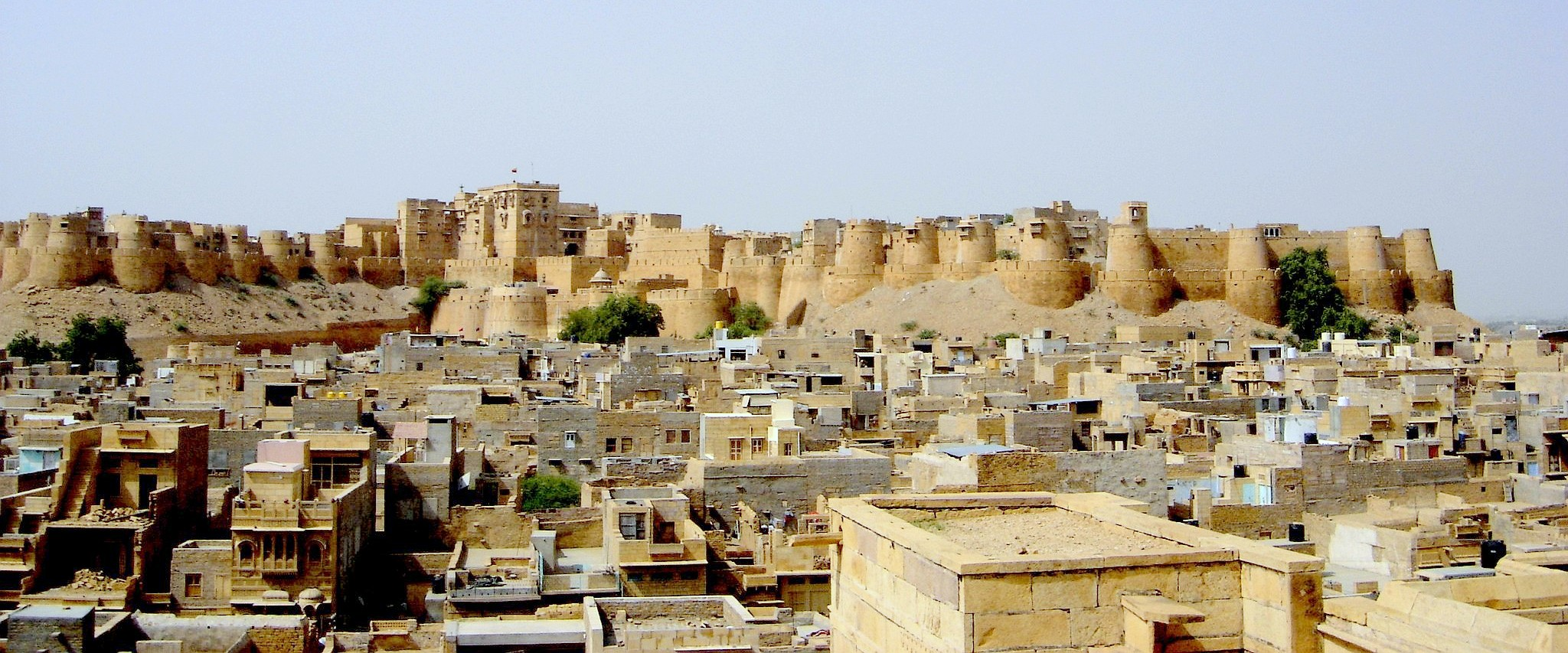
Jaisalmer Fort, originally including the whole city, dominating the more recent city sections below.

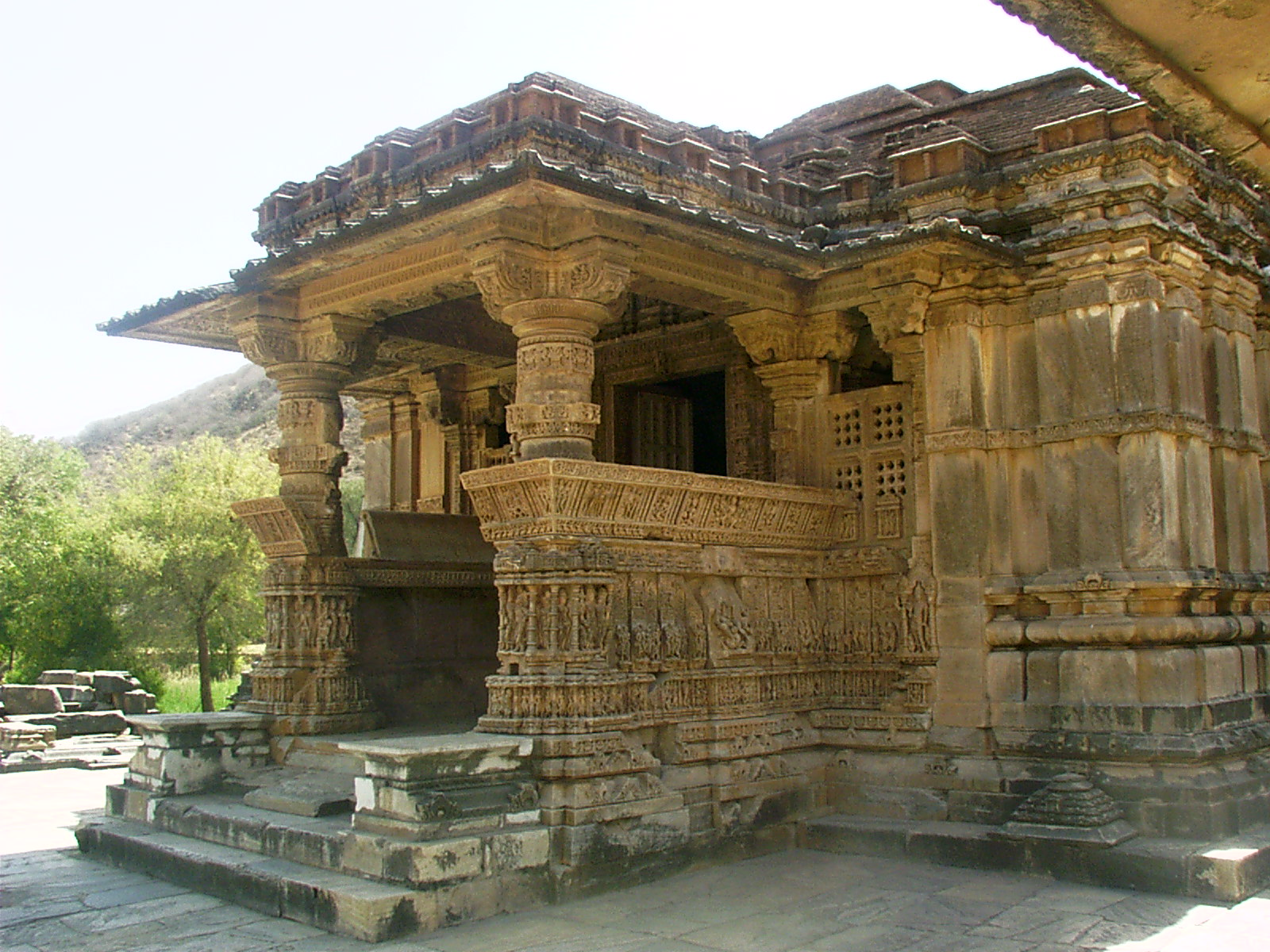
One of the Sahasra Bahu Temples built during the 10th century CE.

The architecture of the Indian state of Rajasthan has usually been a regional variant of the style of Indian architecture prevailing in north India at the time. Rajasthan is especially notable for the forts and palaces of the many Rajput rulers, which are popular tourist attractions.

Most of the population of Rajasthan is Hindu, and there has historically been a considerable Jain minority; this mixture is reflected in the many temples of the region. Māru-Gurjara architecture, or "Solaṅkī style" is a distinctive style that began in Rajasthan and neighbouring Gujarat around the 11th century, and has been revived and taken to other parts of India and the world by both Hindus and Jains. This represents the main contribution of the region to Hindu temple architecture. The Dilwara Jain Temples of Mount Abu built between the 11th and 13th centuries CE are the best-known examples of this style.

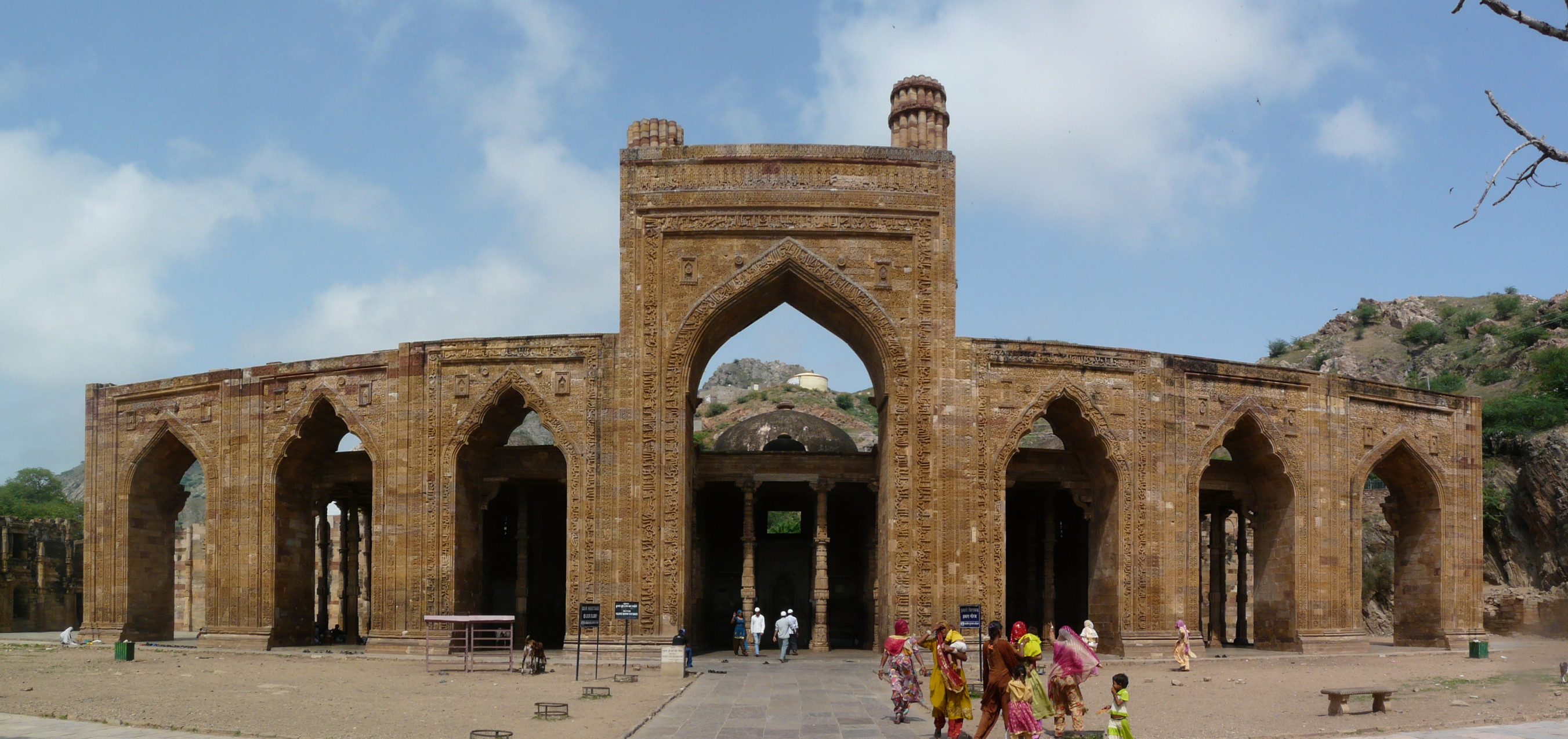
Screen of the Adhai Din Ka Jhonpra mosque in Ajmer; it has pre-Islamic structure (like Hindu or Jain temples) and was partly destroyed and converted to mosque in place at late 12th century.

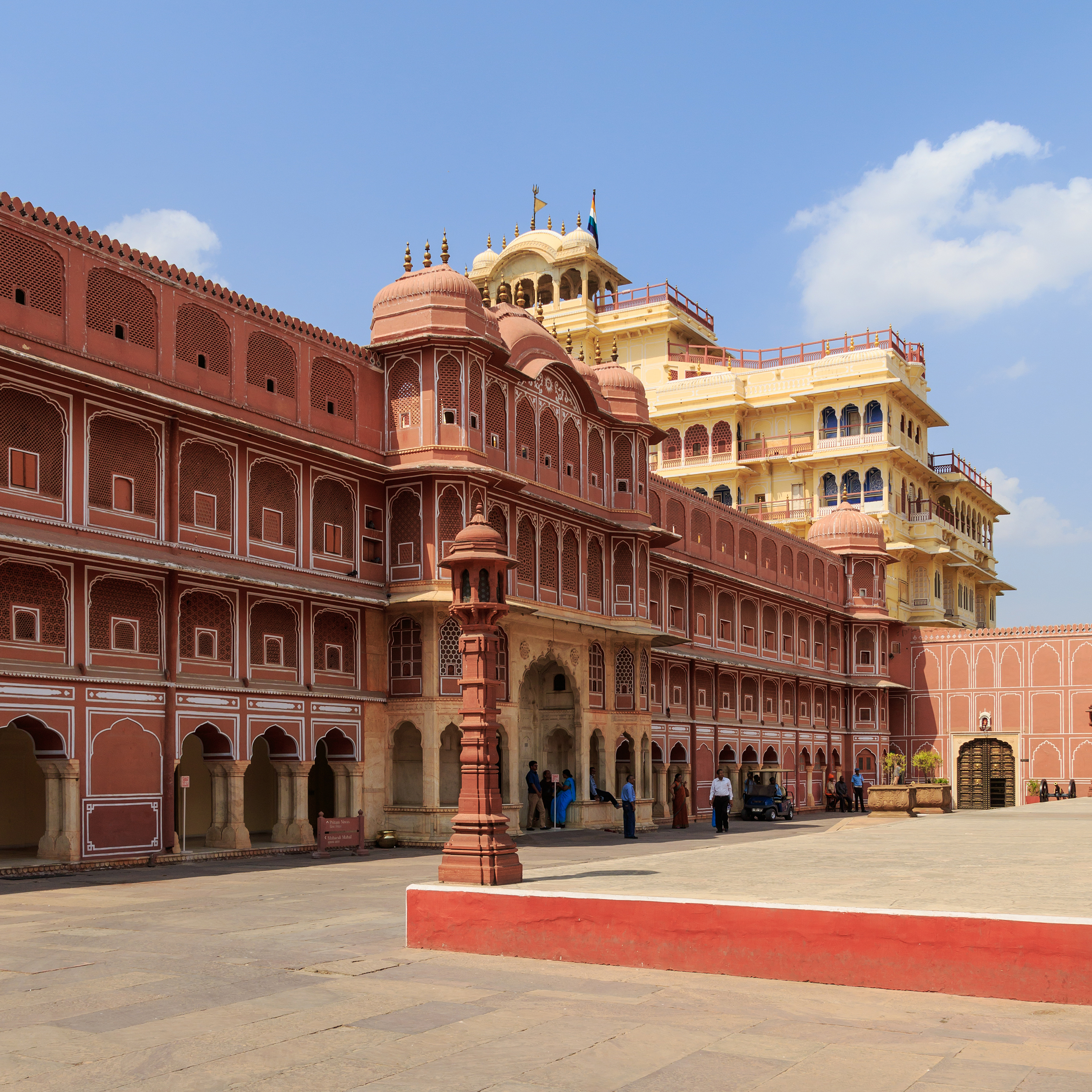
City Palace at Jaipur was designed by Vidyadhar Bhattarcharya and built between 1729 and 1732. The architecture of the palace shows clear Mughal influences on its Rajput Architecture.

The Adhai Din Ka Jhonpra mosque in Ajmer (no longer in religious use) is an important early example of Indo-Islamic architecture in a state not otherwise notable for this.

== Common features ==
The generally arid climate has made stepwells (baoli or bawdi) more common than in other parts of India, as well as the distinctive covered taanka underground tanks.

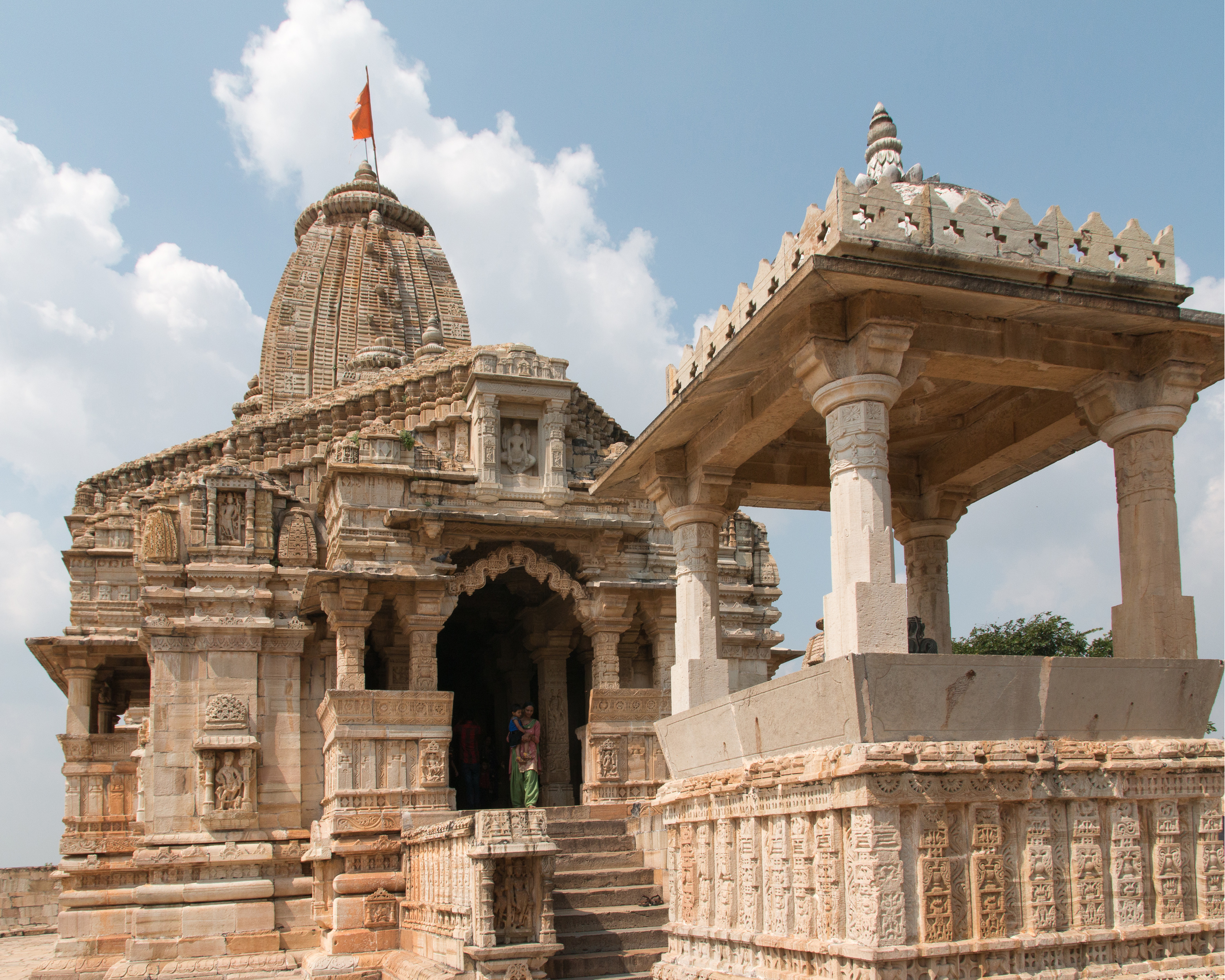
Dedicated to the Hindu gods Meera bai, Krishna and Vishnu. It was constructed between 1599 and 1608 AD by Queen Kanakwati.

Stone carved jali screens are very common, both in temples and secular buildings. As well as palaces, many cities have surviving large townhouses or haveli from the last few centuries.

== Forts and palaces ==
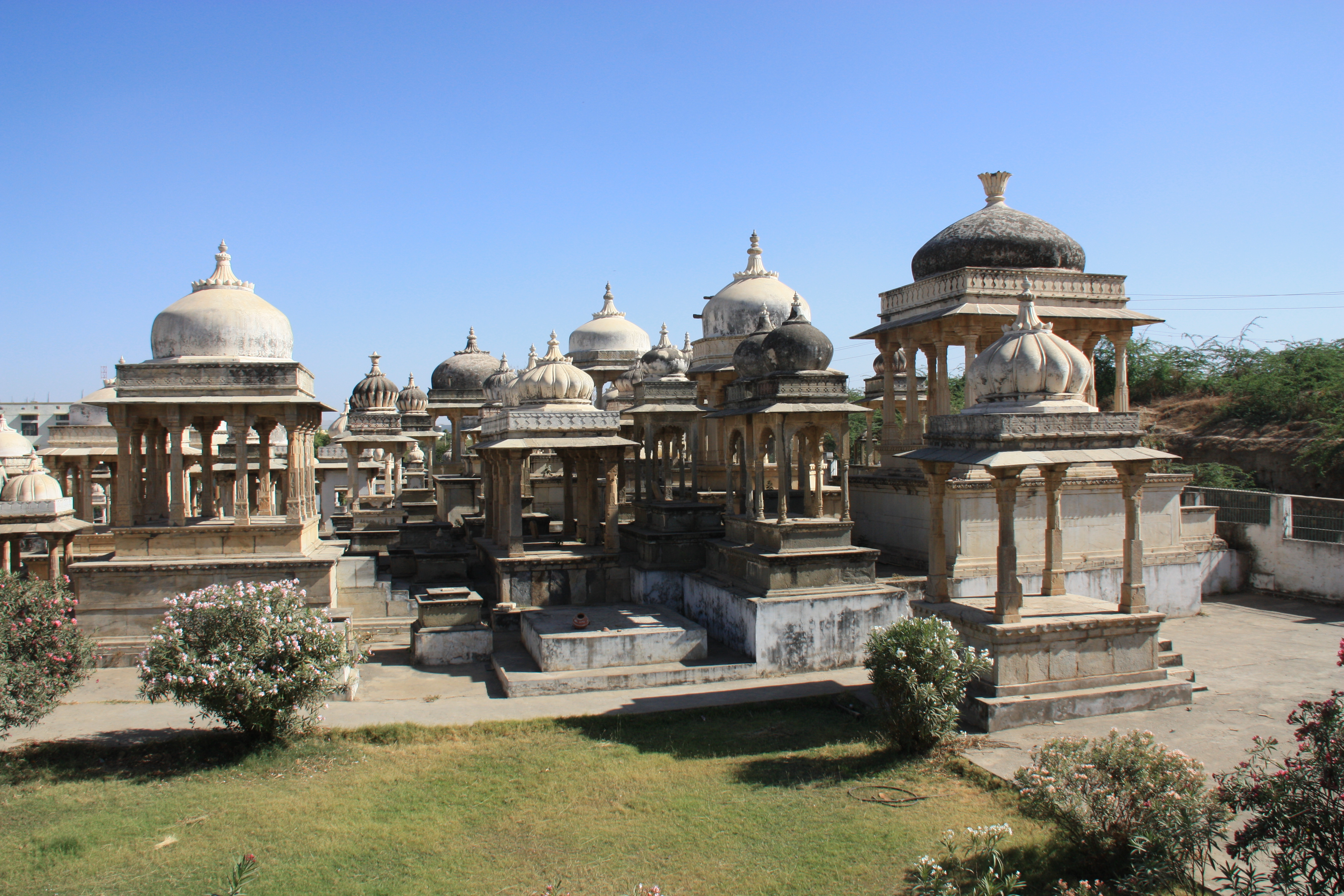
Some of the Ahar Cenotaphs outside Udaipur

The Hill Forts of Rajasthan (Amer, Chittor, Gagron, Jaisalmer, Kumbhalgarh, Ranthambore), a group of six forts built by various Rajput kingdoms and principalities during the medieval period are among the best examples of Rajput Architecture. The ensemble is also a UNESCO World Heritage Site. Other forts include the Mehrangarh Fort and Jaigarh Fort.

The walled city of Jaipur was formed in 1727 by Jai Singh II, and is "a unique example of traditional Hindu town planning", following the precepts set out in much older Hindu texts. Subsequently, the City Palace, Hawa Mahal, Rambagh Palace, Jal Mahal and Albert Hall Museum were also built. Udaipur also has several palaces, including the Bagore-ki-Haveli, now a museum, built by an 18th-century chief minister.

The rulers of the princely states of Rajasthan continued the tradition of building elaborate palaces almost until independence, with examples such as the Lalgarh Palace in Bikaner, Monsoon Palace in Udaipur, and Umaid Bhawan Palace in Jodhpur. Many of these are in versions of Indo-Saracenic architecture, often using European architects.

=== Cenotaphs ===
A number of the Rajput dynasties built groups of cenotaph memorials for their members, mostly using the chatri form, and often at the traditional site for cremations. These include the Ahar Cenotaphs outside Udaipur, and Bada Bagh near Jaisalmer. Individual examples include the Jaswant Thada at Jodphur, Gaitore at Jaipur and Chaurasi Khambon ki Chhatri, Bundi; there are many others.

== History ==
=== Ancient ===
Rajasthan has significant sites of the Bronze Age Indus Valley civilization, in particular at Kalibangan and Sothi. The ruined Bairat Stupa is the state's main Mauryan and Buddhist site, and appears to have been exceptional at this date, as a large circular shrine or temple around a small stupa.

=== Hindu temples ===
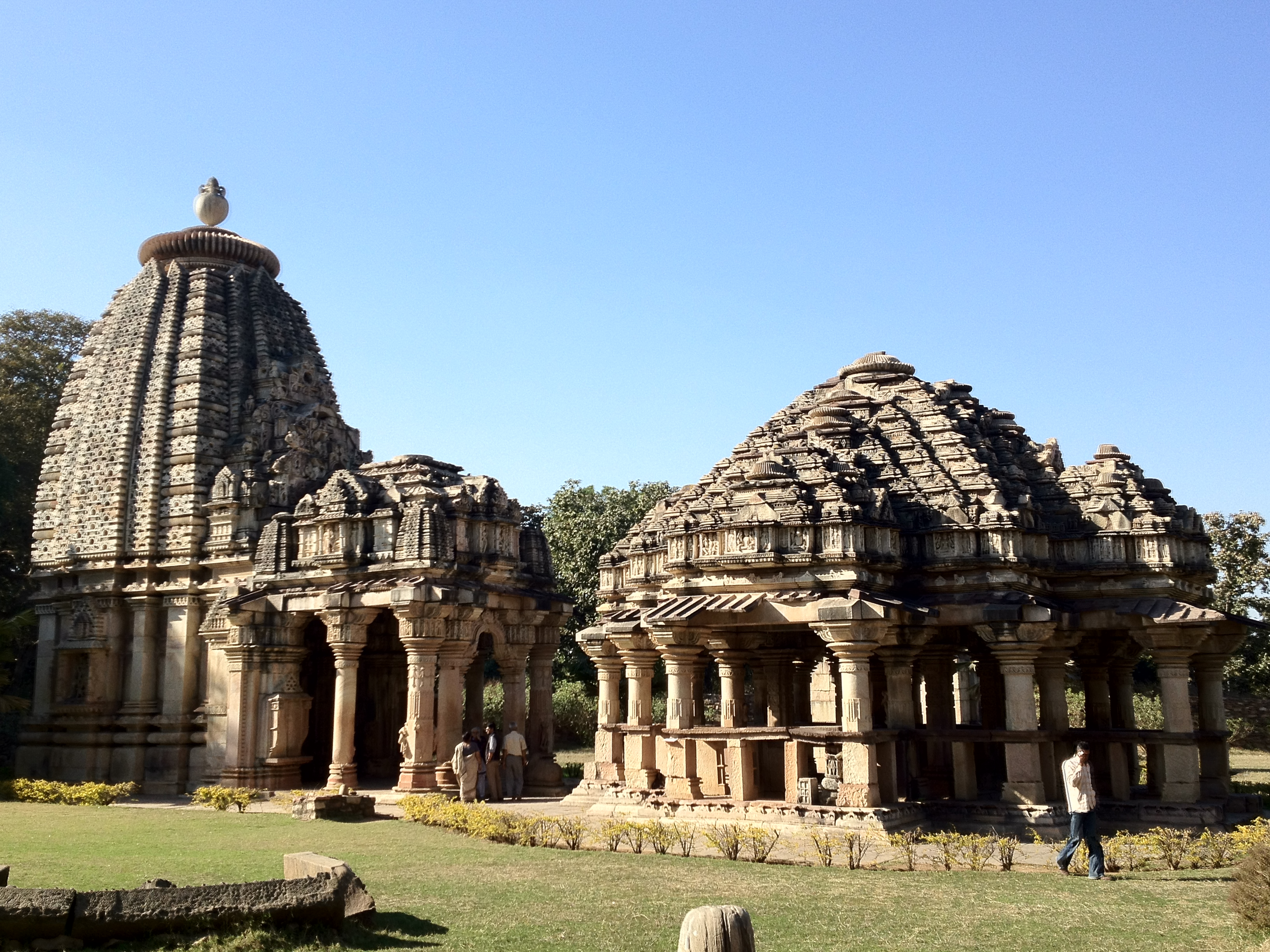
Baroli Temples

Notable early Hindu temples include the early 9th-century Harshat Mata Temple at Abhaneri, where there is also an early stepwell, the Chand Baori, the earliest parts of which are of similar date. The Harshnath Temple in Sikar District is from around 973, according to an inscription. The Badoli or Baroli Temples are an important group of nine 10th-century Hindu temples in the south-east of the state, no longer in religious use, and with much of the sculpture now in museums, especially the one at Kota. Another group is the two late 10th-century Sahasra Bahu Temples at Nagda.

The small but richly-carved Hindu Ambika Mata temple in Jagat, built before 960, is an example of the previous Pratihara style transitioning into Māru-Gurjara architecture. On the exteriors, this style is distinguished from other north Indian temple styles of the period in "that the external walls of the temples have been structured by increasing numbers of projections and recesses, accommodating sharply carved statues in niches. These are normally positioned in superimposed registers, above the lower bands of moldings. The latter display continuous lines of horse riders, elephants, and kīrttimukhas. Hardly any segment of the surface is left unadorned." The main shikhara tower usually has many urushringa subsidiary spirelets on it, and two smaller side-entrances with porches are common in larger temples.

The style mostly fell from use in Hindu temples in its original regions of Rajasthan and Gujarat by the 13th century, especially as the area had fallen to the Muslim Delhi Sultanate by 1298. But, unusually for an Indian temple style, it continued to be used by Jains there and elsewhere, with a notable "revival" in the 15th century.

The five Kiradu temples, of the 11th or 12th century, are examples. The Jagdish Temple, Udaipur (completed 1651) is an example of a Hindu temple using the Māru-Gurjara style at a late date; in this case a commission of Jagat Singh I, ruler of Mewar.

=== Jain temples ===
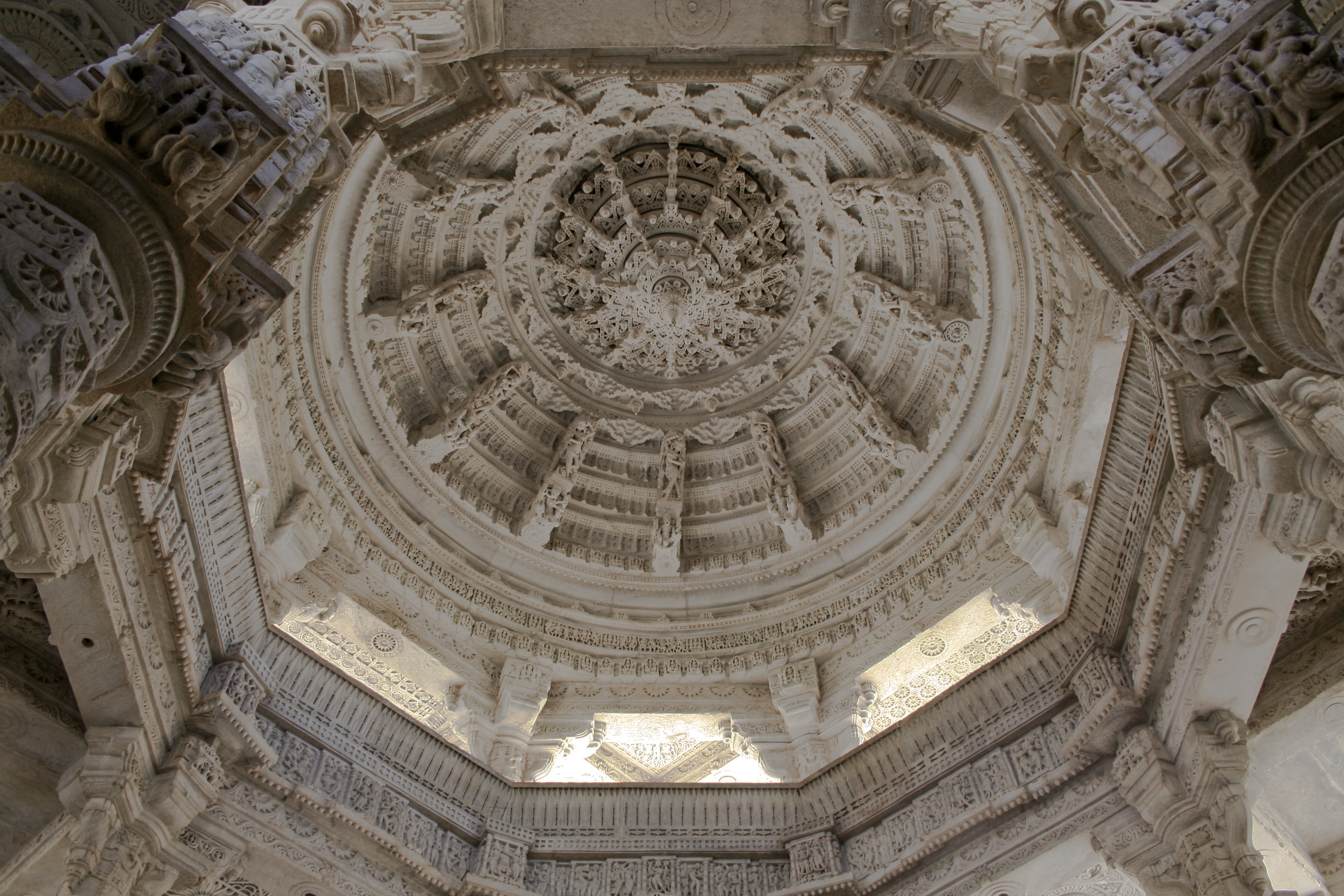
Mandapa ceiling in the Ranakpur Jain Temple

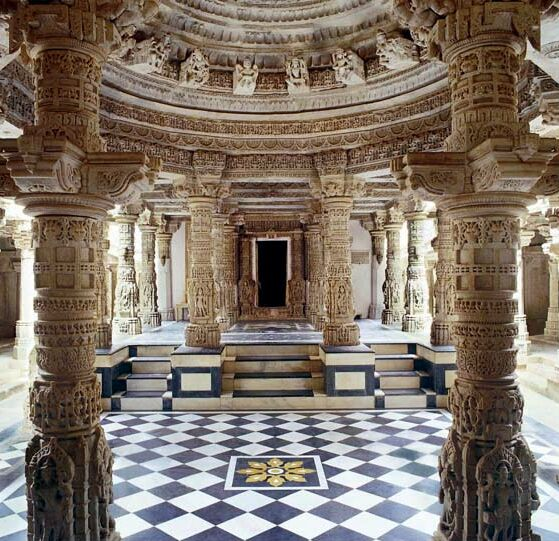
Luna Vasahi, Dilwara temples

Māru-Gurjara architecture is especially popular in Jain temples. Interiors are if anything even more lavishly decorated, with elaborate carving on most surfaces. In particular, Jain temples often have small low domes carved on the inside with a highly intricate rosette design. Another distinctive feature is "flying" arch-like elements between pillars, touching the horizontal beam above in the centre, and elaborately carved. These have no structural function, and are purely decorative. The style developed large pillared halls, many open at the sides, with Jain temples often having one closed and two pillared halls in sequence on the main axis leading to the shrine.

Significant older Jain temples, or groups of temples, include the Dilwara temples on Mount Abu, the Ranakpur Jain temple, the group at Osian, Jodhpur, including the Mahavira Jain temple, Osian (also early Hindu temples), Mirpur Jain Temple (in fact one of four there), the disputed Kesariyaji temple at Rishabhdeo, and the Suswani Mataji temple at Morkhana.

The Kirti Stambha at Chittor Fort is a spectacular 12th-century tower, carved in Māru-Gurjara style, erected by a Jain merchant.

== Gallery ==
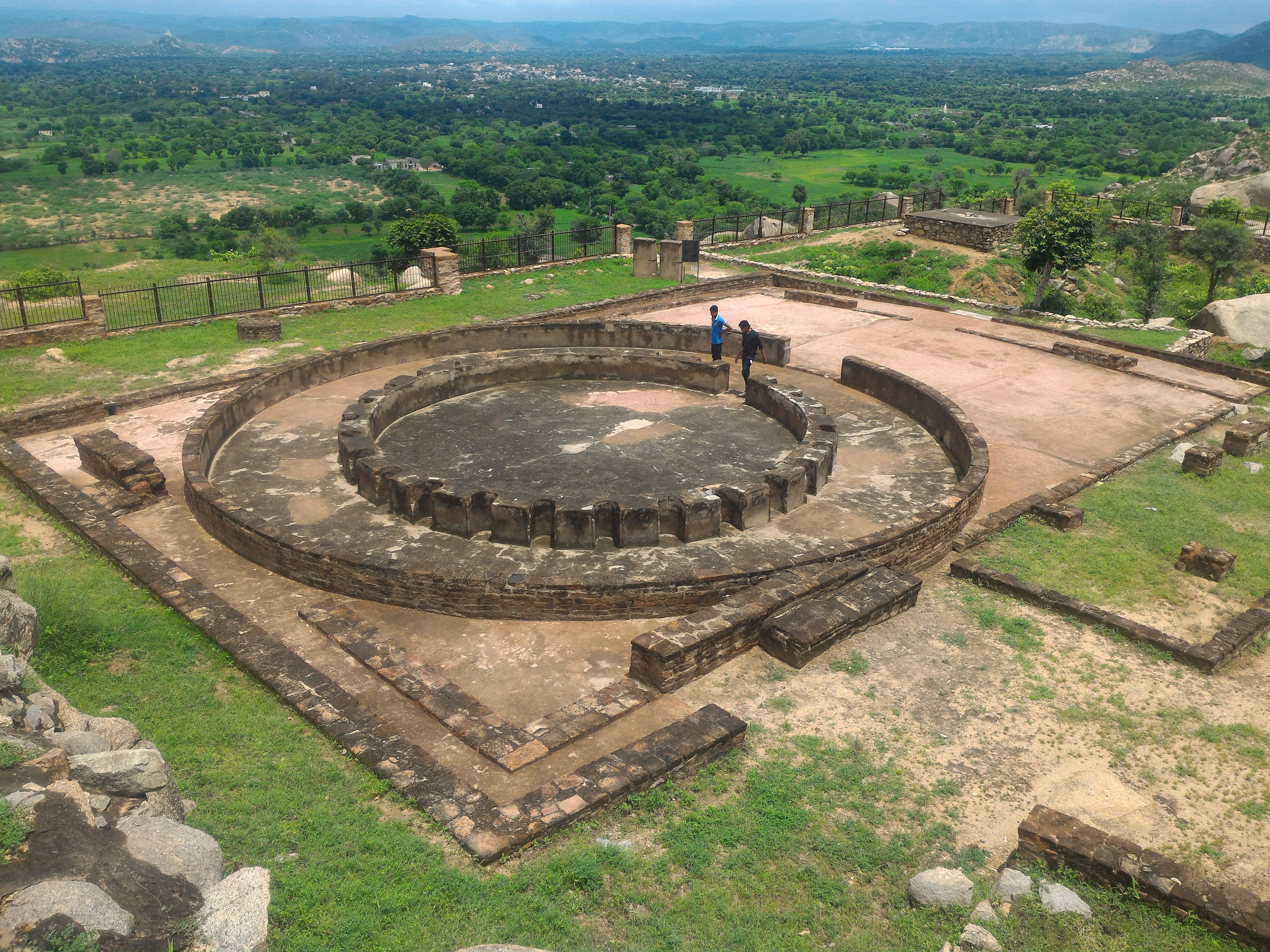
Remains of the Bairat stupa, 3rd century BCE

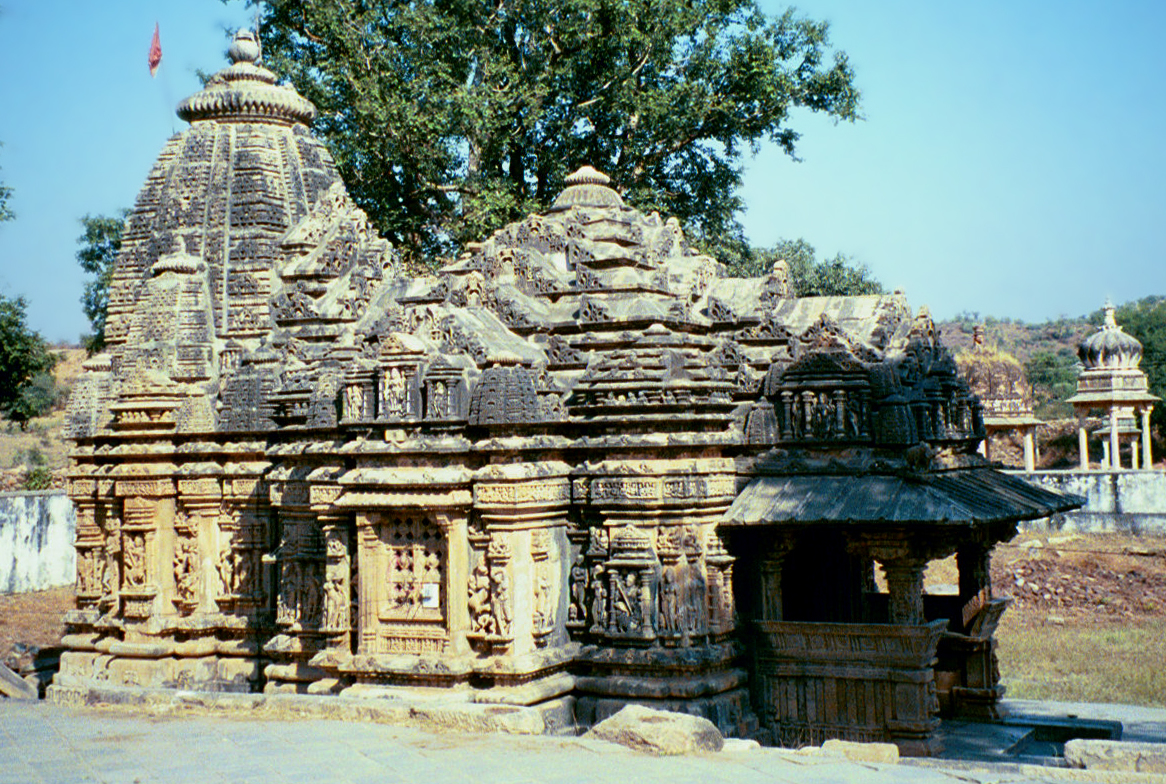
Ambika Mata temple in Jagat, Rajasthan, by 960

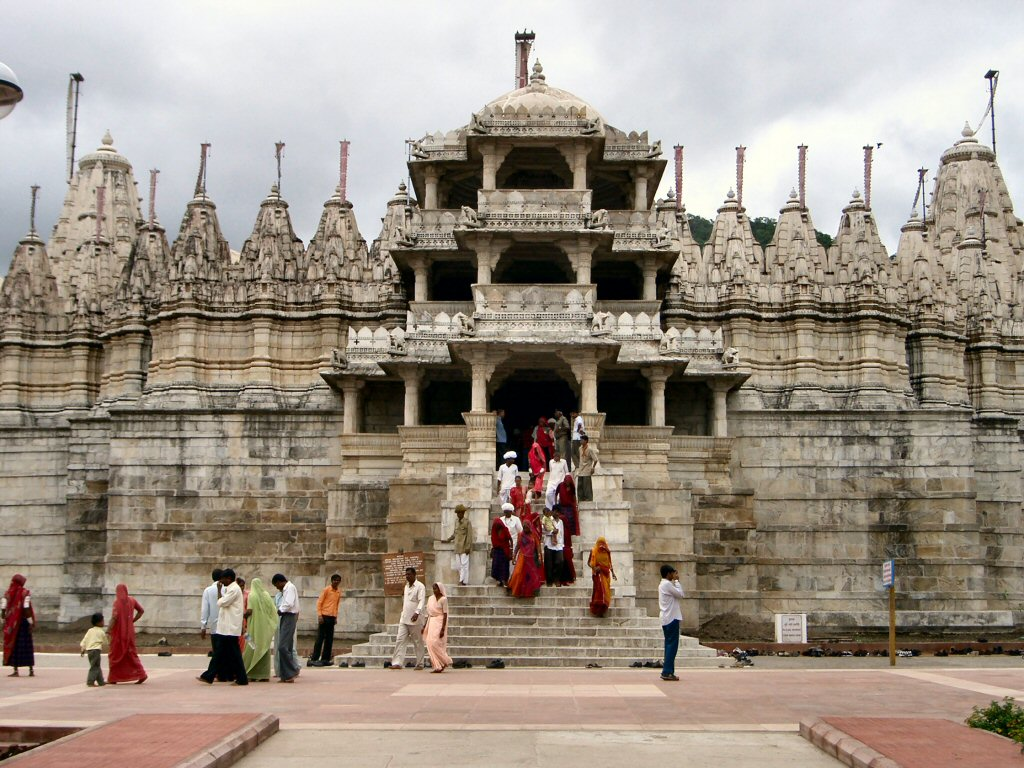
Ranakpur Jain temple

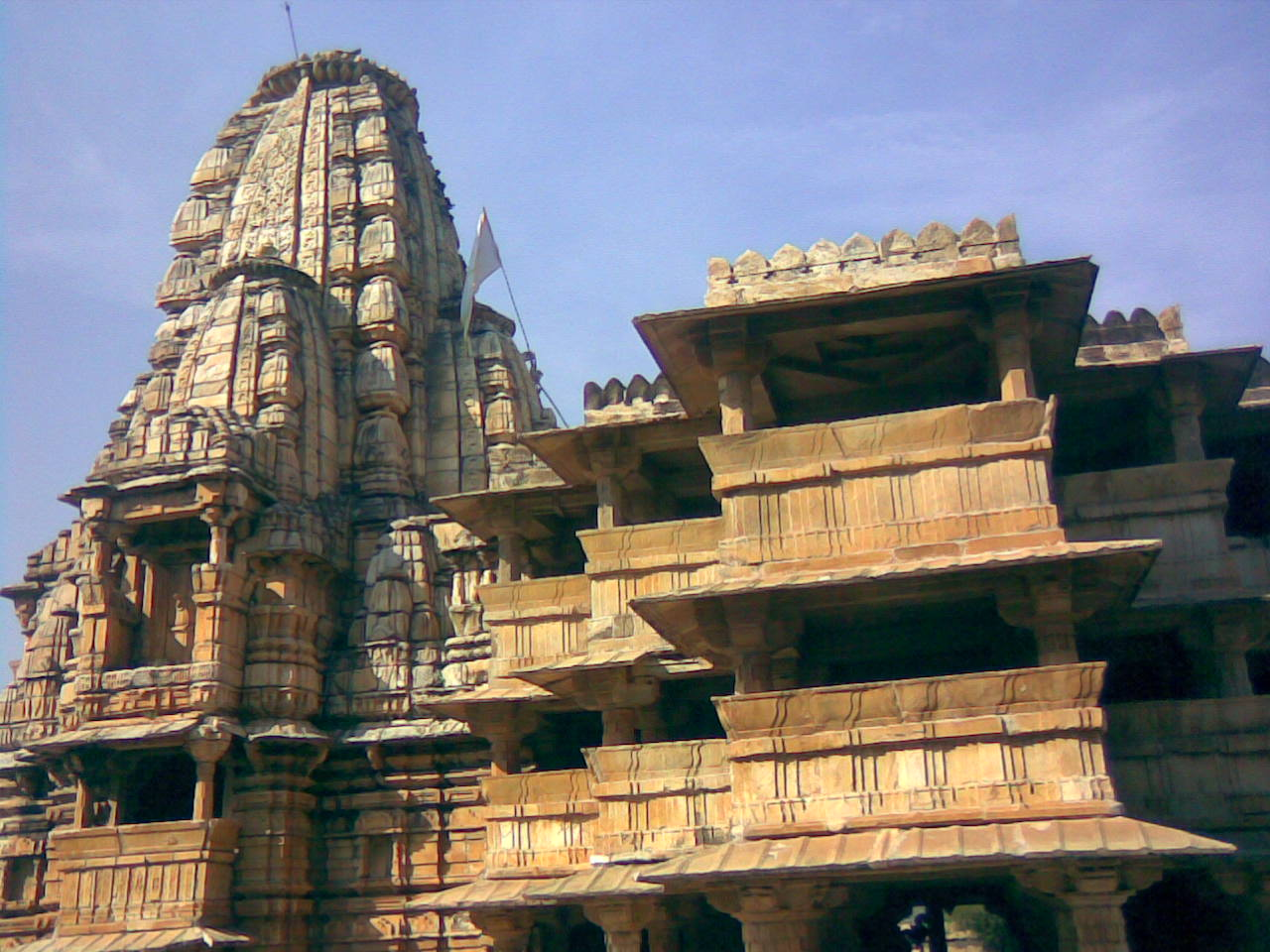
Dev Somnath Temple

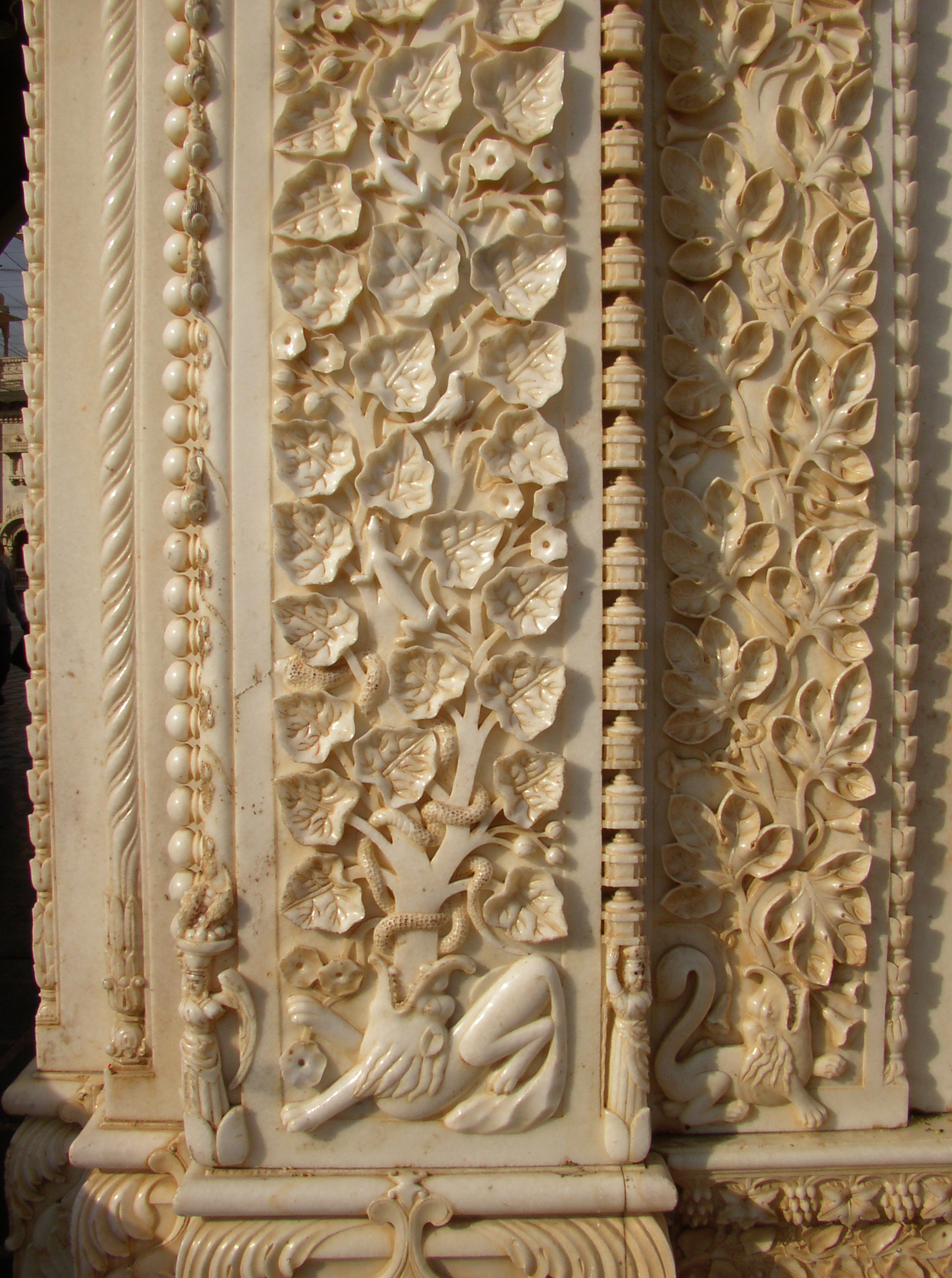
Detailed Stone work, Karni Mata Temple, Bikaner Rajasthan

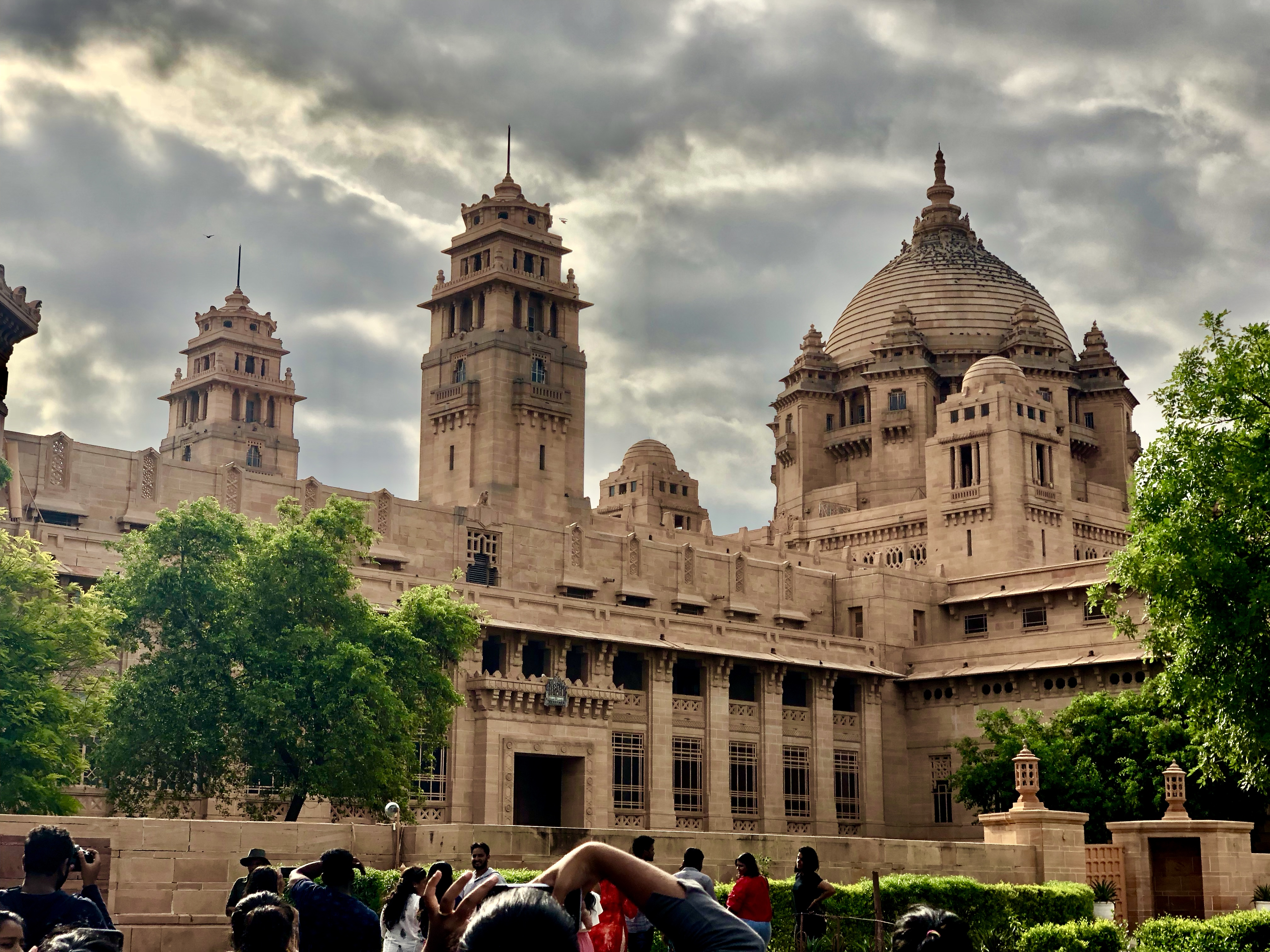
The Umaid Bhawan Palace at Jodhpur built between 1929 and 1942 is one of the largest royal palaces in the world. It was designed by Henry Vaughan Lanchester in a blend of Beaux-Arts and traditional Rajasthani styles.

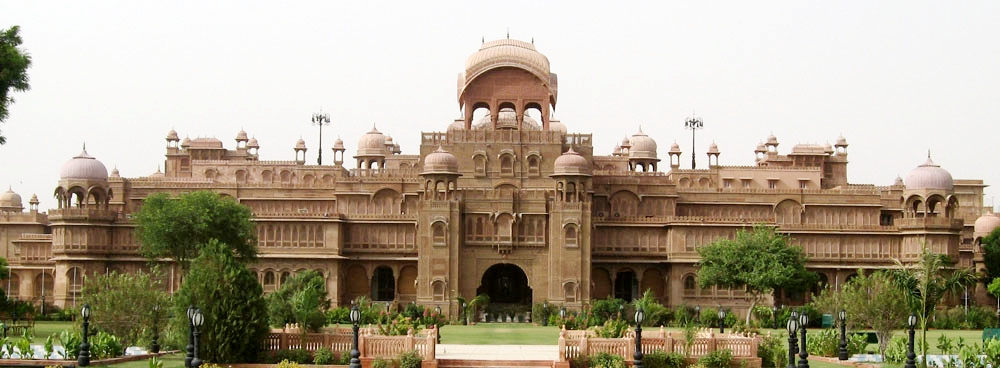
Lalgarh Palace, Bikaner, designed in the Indo-Saracenic style by Samuel Swinton Jacob.

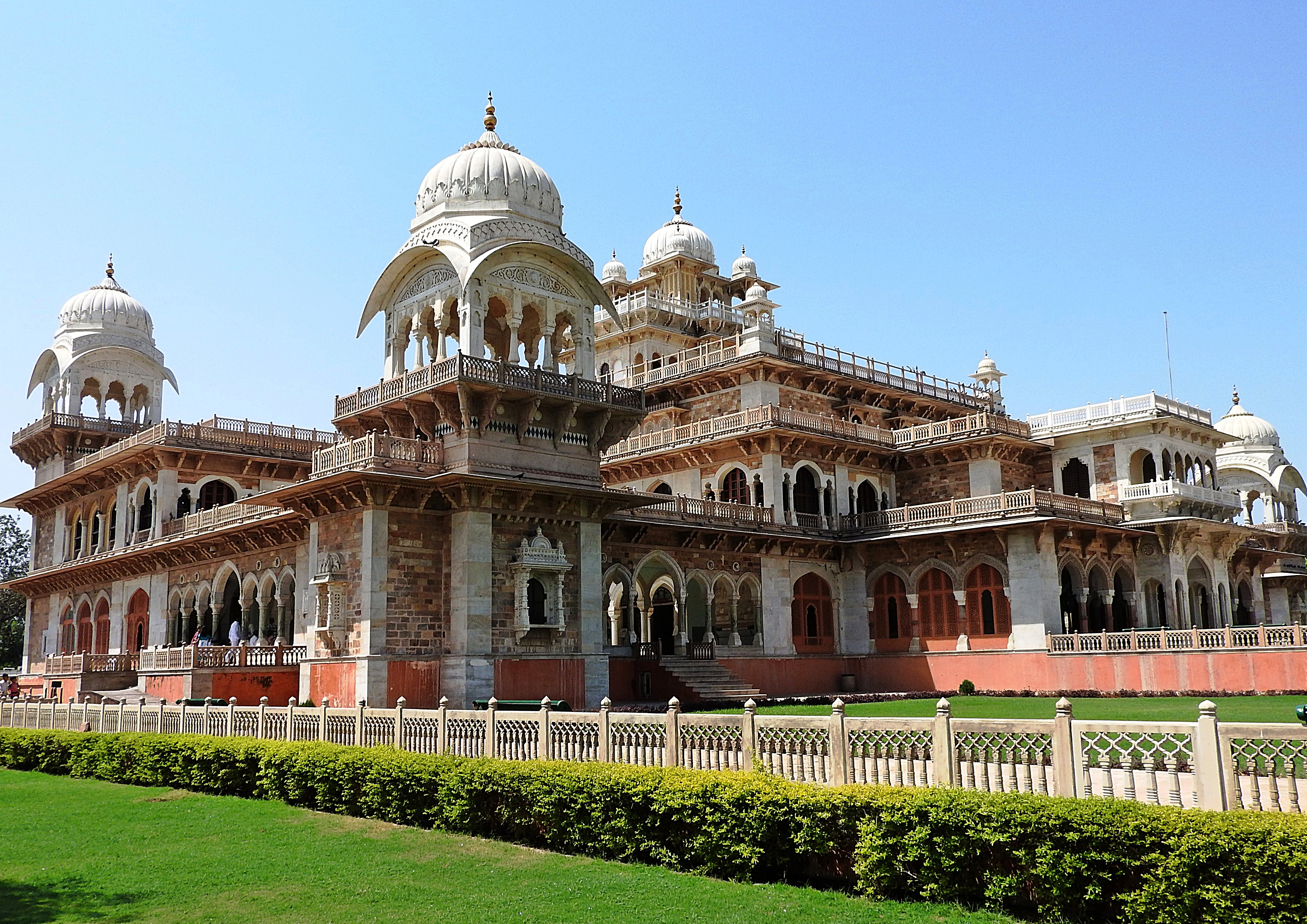
The Albert Hall Museum was designed by Samuel Swinton Jacob, and was opened as public museum in 1887.

== See also ==
- Painted Haveli Towns of Shekhawati
- Johad
