= Jawahar Circle =

Park in Jaipur (Rajasthan), India

The Jawahar Circle
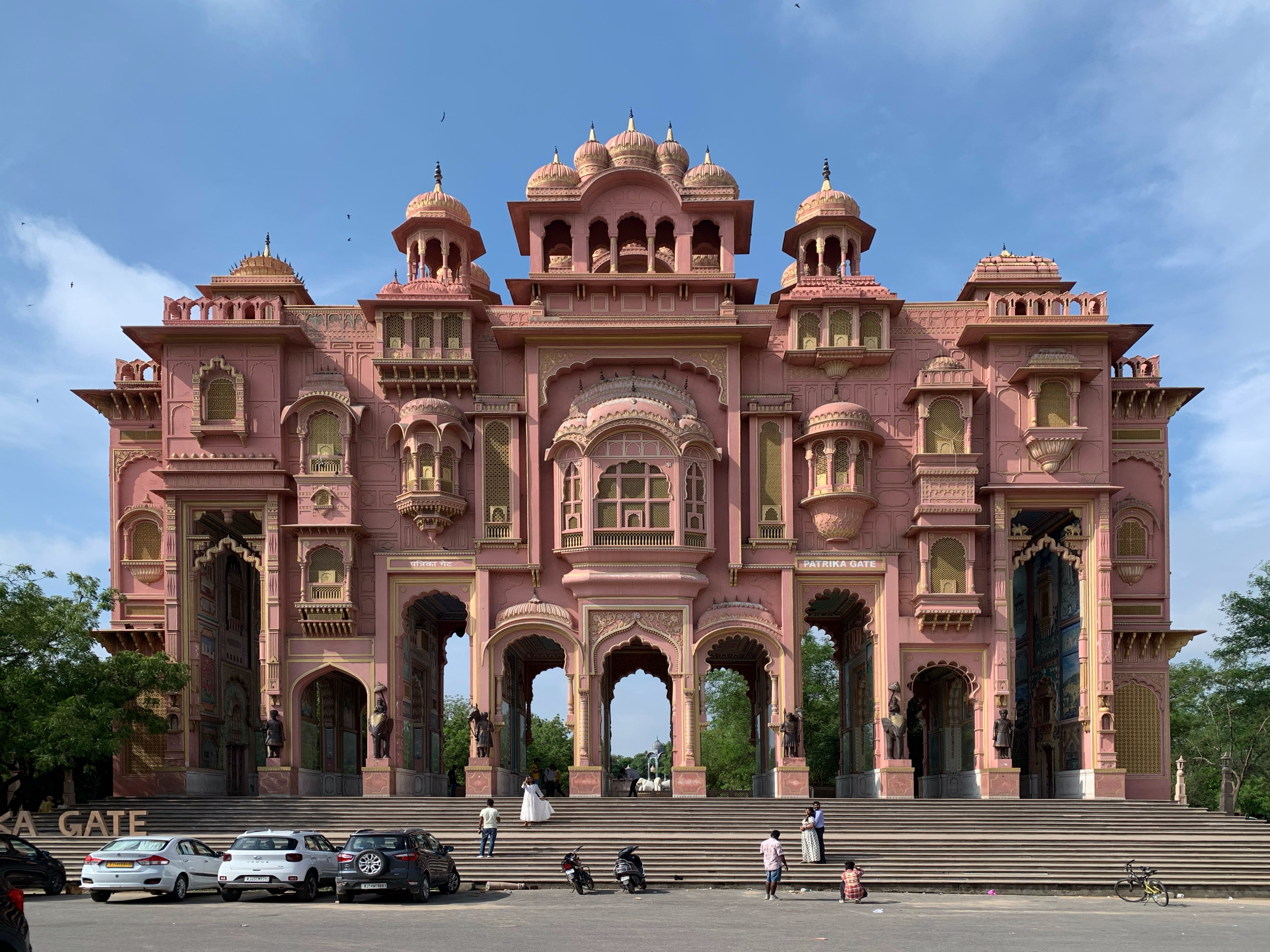
- Patrika Gate, the facade of Jawahar Circle Garden in 2022
- Location in Jaipur
- Location: Jaipur, Rajasthan, India
- Coordinates: 26°50′25″N 75°48′01″E

The Jawahar Circle is a garden traffic circle and heavily trafficked intersection in the city of Jaipur, India built by the Jaipur Development Authority.

== Overview ==
Jawahar Circle is claimed to be the biggest circular park in Asia developed on a highway traffic circle. It is situated in Malviya Nagar, near Sanganer Airport, on Jawaharlal Nehru Marg.

Although Swaraj Road, Thrissur, Kerala also claims to be the largest circle in Asia, the largest traffic circle or roundabout in the world with a diameter of more than 3.5 km (2.2 mi) is actually in Putrajaya, Malaysia.

The diameter of the circle is 452 m (1,483 ft) and the circumference measures 1,420 m (4,660 ft). This park was fully developed by JDA (Jaipur Development Authority), and is one of Jaipur's popular leisure destinations. There are multiple concentric tracks in the park. It is surrounded by rose gardens.

JDA has spent 170 lacs for the further development of this circle, planning to include a number of new features, such as musical fountains, walkways, parking spaces, landscaping, modern play equipment, and jogging tracks.

The Fountain has been installed in a water-body in the center of the park. Every evening at 7 pm a show is held for 30 minutes, when the water sprays with the rhythm of the music and is illuminated by colored lights. Taking a hint from the Si-Fi world, they now show music videos on a wall of spray.

The radius of the water body is 47 m (154 ft). There are 290 effects. The height of the fountain is 25 m (82 ft). The water screen size is 27 m (89 ft) wide by 9 m (30 ft) high. There are 316 colored lights. The video projector is 15,000 lumens.

Rajasthan is a desert state, and to maintain such big gardens and fountains with drinking water would be foolhardy, so the government is using re-cycled water. Though safe for the garden, the fountain is definitely not safe for drinking or for bathing with.
