= Dravyavati River =

River in Rajasthan, India

The Dravyavati River is a major south-flowing river in Rajasthan. It originates on the western slope of the Amber hills and flows through Jaipur, north to south over a length of 57.5 km (35.7 mi), making it one of the smallest rivers in India, providing a major source of water to the city. It finally joins the Dhund river, near Santoshpura. Most of Jaipur's population stays within a 10 km (6.2 mi) periphery of the Dravyavati river.

== Deterioration ==
In 2016 the river was described as having deteriorated into a nullah, over the preceding century. The river had been comprehensively damaged by local pollution, garbage and debris. Tata has been allotted the task to clear debris and filth of the nulla to rejuvenate it to her ancient glory, progress have been made over years but it still seems to have a long way too go considering some of the nulla in residential areas such as Kartarpura Nulla is not been integrated in the project despite constant pleas and lawsuits by the locals, it has been contended that Kartarpura nulla turns into a massive sink hole risking lives of people passing nearby when it downpours intensely. the matter is still pending in the High Court, Jaipur. Two River fronts have been constructed across Jaipur city as part of this project.

One cause of the pollution is the collection of storm water from adjoining areas such as Ambabari, the Walled City of Jaipur, Sanganer town and Pratap Nagar. Sewerage mixed with domestic wastewater and industrial waste drains into the river through Nahri ka Nallah, Jawahar Nallah and other streams that come from structured and unstructured sewerage systems of the suburbs.

Major flooding occurred in July 1981 that washed away many dams and embankments on the river. Subsequent encroaching development and pollution changed the nature of the river to the degree that it became known as "Amanishah nullah". Another flood in August 2012 left the city of Jaipur devastated, thousands homeless and many dead.

== Rejuvenation project ==
In 2015 Tata Group produced a report for the rejuvenation of the river. This was approved by Rajasthan's state-level empowered committee (SLEC) in October 2015, the estimated project cost for the Dravyavati River rejuvenation is ₹1,676 crore. This cost typically includes the initial construction, operation, and maintenance for a period of 10 years (a capital expenditure of ₹1470.85 crore with an additional 10-year operation and maintenance cost of ₹206.08 crore, summing up to the total of ₹1676.93 crore).

The contract for the project was awarded by the Jaipur Development Authority (JDA) to a consortium comprising Tata Projects and the Shanghai Urban Construction Group with an initial cost of over 16 million USD (around INR 1600 crores) to complete the work by October 2018. Construction works will include 85 check dams and 122 fall structures.

As part of the rejuvenation project a combined footpath and cycle track running alongside the river from the source at Jaisalya to Goner, 47 km (29 mi), has been proposed.
