= List of cinemas in Jaipur =

Cinema list in Jaipur, India

Jaipur has several single screen theatres and multiplexes. Cinema is a popular form of entertainment for people and people have a special liking for Bollywood, and more recently Hollywood. The entertainment tax on cinema halls and multiplexes was eliminated in March 2011.

== Single-screen theatres ==
There are several prominent single-screen theatres in the city, although a number of them have been renovated, converted into multiplexes or shopping complexes.

Cinema	Established	Location
Raj Mandir	1976	Bhagwan Das Road
Laxmi Mandir		Tonk Phatak

== Multiplexes ==
A number of multiplexes have come up in Jaipur city. They screen both Bollywood and Hollywood movies.

Cinema	Location
Cinepolis	World Trade Park
Entertainment Paradise	Jawahar Circle
Inox	Crystal Palm, C Scheme; Vaibhav, Amrapali Circle; Pink Square, Govind Marg
BIG Cinemas	Galaxy; Cinestar
Fun Cinemas	Jhotwara
Golcha	Sanganeri Gate
