= Goner, Rajasthan =

Goner
- village
- Location in Rajasthan, India Goner (India)
- Coordinates: 26.7795°N 75.9123°E
- Country: India
- State: Rajasthan
- District: Jaipur

Area
  - Total: 2.51 km^{2} (0.97 sq mi)
- Elevation: 383 m (1,257 ft)

Population
  - Total: 12,049
  - Density: 4,800/km^{2} (12,400/sq mi)

Languages
  - Official: Hindi, Rajasthani
- Time zone: UTC+5:30 (IST)
- PIN: 303905
- Nearest city: Jaipur
- Climate: Hot and dry (Köppen)

Goner is a village of over 12,000 inhabitants in India. It is situated in Sanganer tehsil of Jaipur district, Rajasthan, 20 kilometres (12 mi) south of state capital Jaipur.

== Geography ==
The village is located at 26.7795°N 75.9123°E, at an altitude of 383 metres (1,257 ft), and its area is 251.0 hectares (2.510 km^{2}).

The Dravyavati River passes through Goner.

== Demographics ==
As of 2011 the population was 14800. The literacy rate was 77% and the sex ratio was 899 female per 1000 male.
