= Ring Road, Jaipur =

Road in Rajasthan, India

Ring Road
- Ring Road in red

Route information
- Maintained by Jaipur Development Authority
- Length: 147 km (91 mi)

Location
- Country: India
- State: Rajasthan

Highway system
- Roads in India; Expressways; National; State; Asian; State Highways in Rajasthan

The Ring Road (also known as NH 148C) is a 147 kilometres ring road encircling the city of Jaipur, Rajasthan, India. It is built by Jaipur Development Authority (JDA). The expressway is designed for speeds up to 120 km/h. Construction of the Ring Road around Jaipur was conceived by PWD in December 2000 on BOT basis. In Phase I & II, a road with a length of 47 km will be constructed in the south of Jaipur, connecting Ajmer Road, Tonk Road and Agra Road. In Phase III, a road with a length of 97.75 km will be constructed in the northern part of Jaipur and will connect Agra Road, Delhi Road, Sikar Road and Ajmer Road.

== Construction ==
The construction contract, valued at ₹900 crore, was awarded to Sanjose-Supreme in May 2011.

It will consist of a six-lane access controlled expressway; a three-lane service road on both sides; a 135 m R&R and an investors' development corridor on both sides. The road is envisaged as a toll-free and signal free expressway.

The project stalled due to deadlock between the JDA and the farmers over compensation to be paid for acquisition of the land. To solve the deadlock the Union ministry of urban development proposed a scheme whereby the land owners would receive 60% of their land area back, instead of the previous 25%, in the form of new regular plots with road access.

== Status updates ==
- Mar 2019: 27 km of ring road connecting Tonk Road and Ajmer Road stands completed and inaugurated by Union Road Minister Nitin Gadkari. Construction work on 20 km of ring road connecting Tonk Road and Agra Road nearly complete.
- Mar 2020: Work on Agra road portion of Jaipur ring road to start soon as land acquisition hurdle almost cleared.
- Nov 2020: Ring road portion between Tonk Road and Agra road opened for traffic despite cloverleaf part of ring road being still is pending at Agra road.
- Dec 2020: Foundation stone laid for construction of cover lead on Ajmer Road and Tonk Road. Land acquisition yet to be done for cover leaf at Agra road so that will be constructed later.
- Jan 2021: A new 45 km long northern portion of ring road is proposed which will connect Agra Road junction of ring road with Jaipur-Delhi road near Achrol village.JDA plans to construct this portion of ring road.
