= Sahasra Bahu Temples =

Hindu temple in Rajasthan, India

Coordinates: 24°44′10″N 73°43′15″E

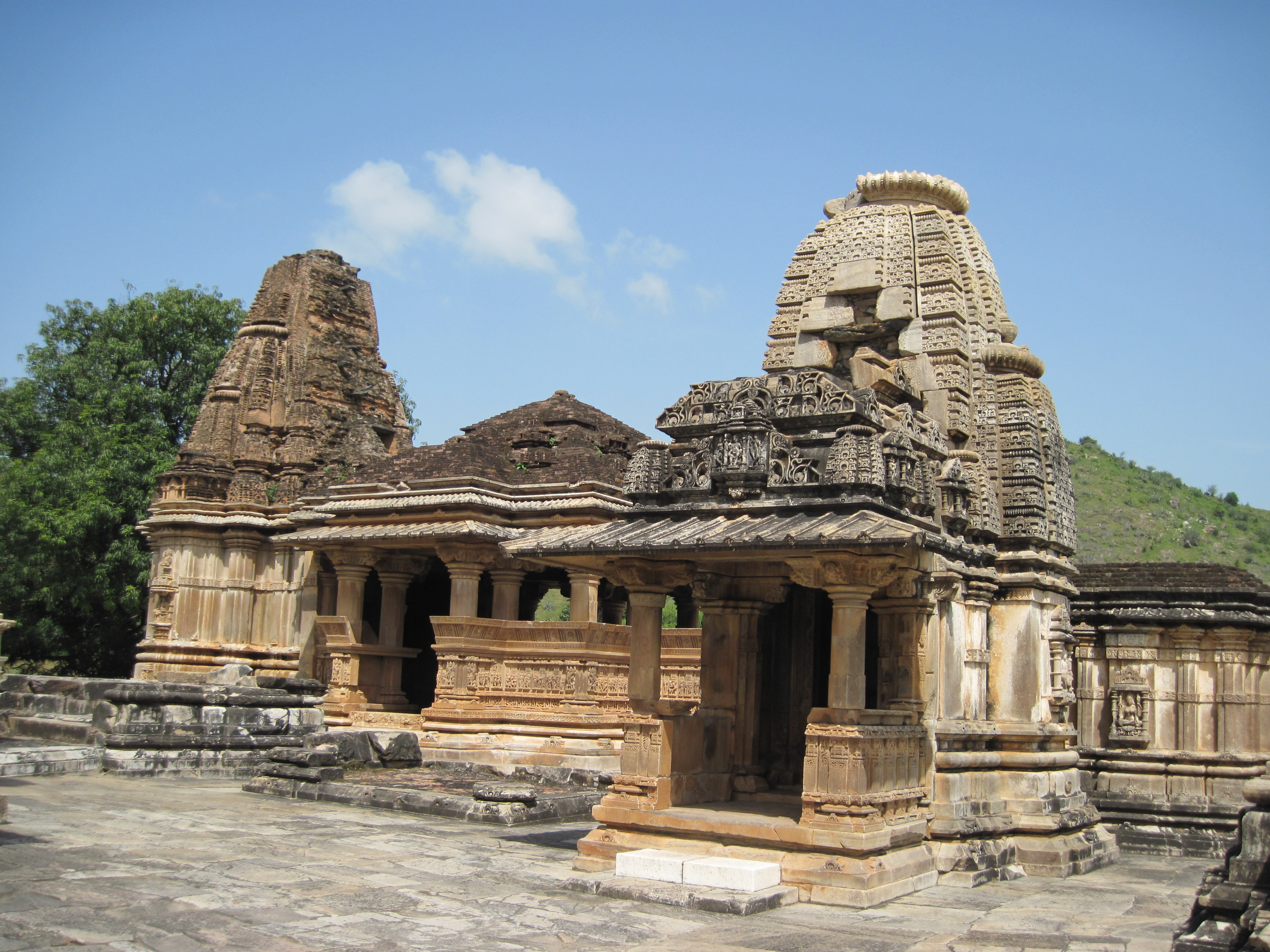
- Sahasra Bahu Temples

- Location within India Location within Rajasthan

Religion
- Affiliation: Hinduism
- District: Nagda
- Deity: Virabhadra

Location
- Location: Nagda
- State: Rajasthan
- Country: India
- Interactive map of Sahasra Bahu Temples

Architecture
- Style: Māru-Gurjara
- Completed: 10th-century

Sahasra Bahu Temple1

The Sahasra Bahu temples or Sasbahu Temples, at Nagda, Rajasthan, are a pair of late 10th-century Hindu temples dedicated to Virabhadra. They share a platform, facing the temple tank, and are similar in style, but one is rather larger than the other. The larger one is surrounded by ten subsidiary shrines, the smaller by four; only the bases remain of some of these. The temples have many of the characteristics of slightly later Māru-Gurjara architecture but lack others, especially in the plan and exterior sculpture.

They are locally referred to as Sas Bahu temples (a local corruption of the original Sahasra-Bahu, meaning "One with thousand arms", a form of Vishnu).

Nagda was once an important city of Mewar, possibly a capital of one of its rulers.

Both temples have a sanctuary, mandapa with side projections, and an open porch. Their somewhat ruined shikharas are in brick, with many subsidiary turrets. That of the smaller temple has been largely repaired, while the larger one remains truncated. Below the platform there is a torana-style entrance screen, with four columns and a decorative cusped arch in the centre.

The interiors and parts of the exteriors, especially around the porches, are lavishly carved, but much of the exteriors are plain.

Lotus flower painting is visible on the roof top of temple. Iltutmish (Delhi emperor of that time) destroyed Nagda in 1226.

The temples are on the Archaeological Survey of India's list of heritage monuments.

Adbhutji Shanthinath Jain Tirth or Nagahyuda Jain Mandir, an ancient Jain centre is located nearby, next to the Bagela Lake.

== Location ==
The site is very easily accessible by road, only about 20 km from Udaipur (one of the main lake & palace hotspots of Tourism in Rajasthan), a mere 2.7 km from the well frequented Shaivite shrine of Eklingji, or 30 km from the hugely popular Vaishnavite shrine town of Nathdwara.

== Gallery ==
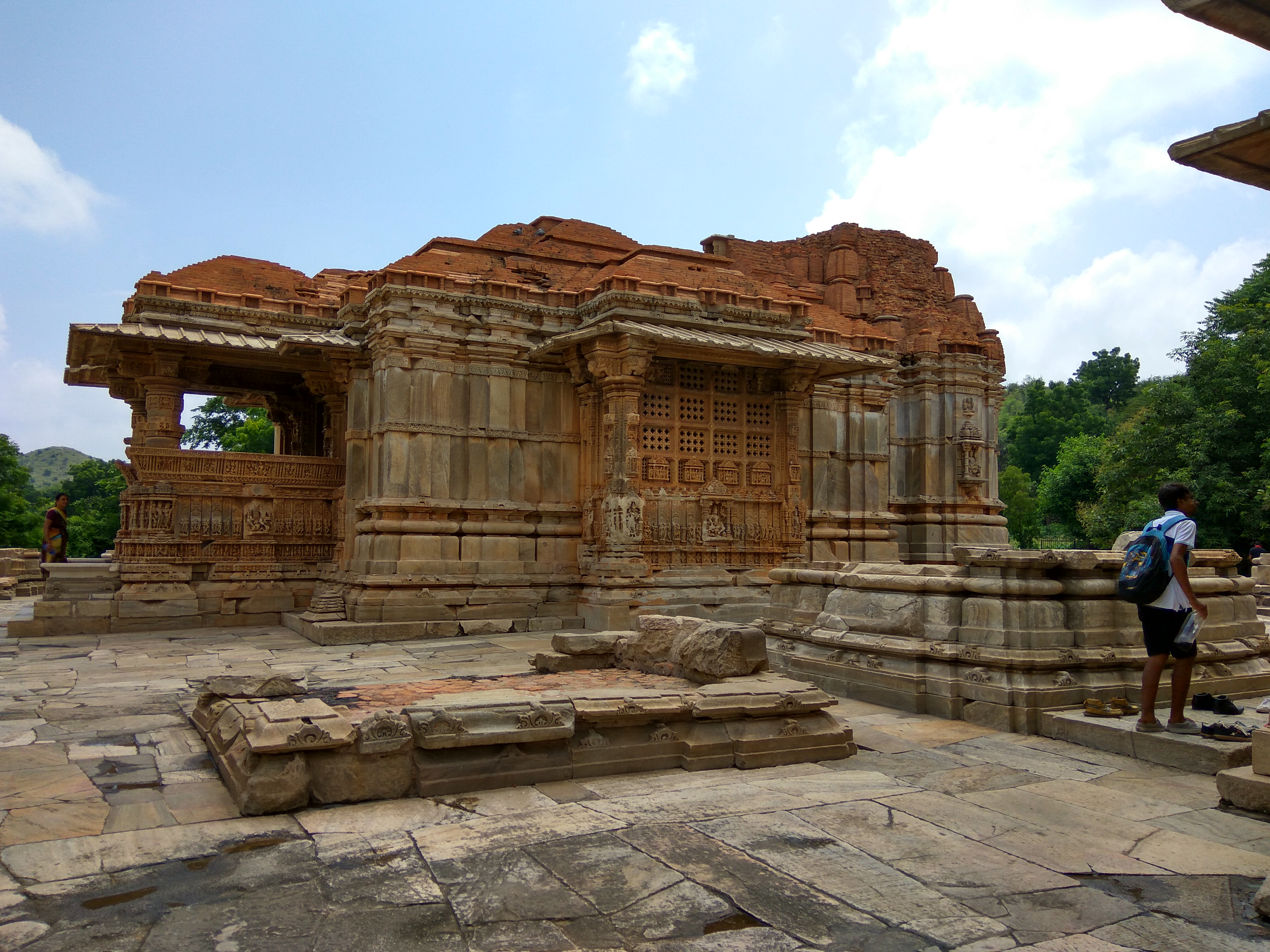
Temple 1

Sahasra Bahu Temple2

Carvings on the walls of the temple

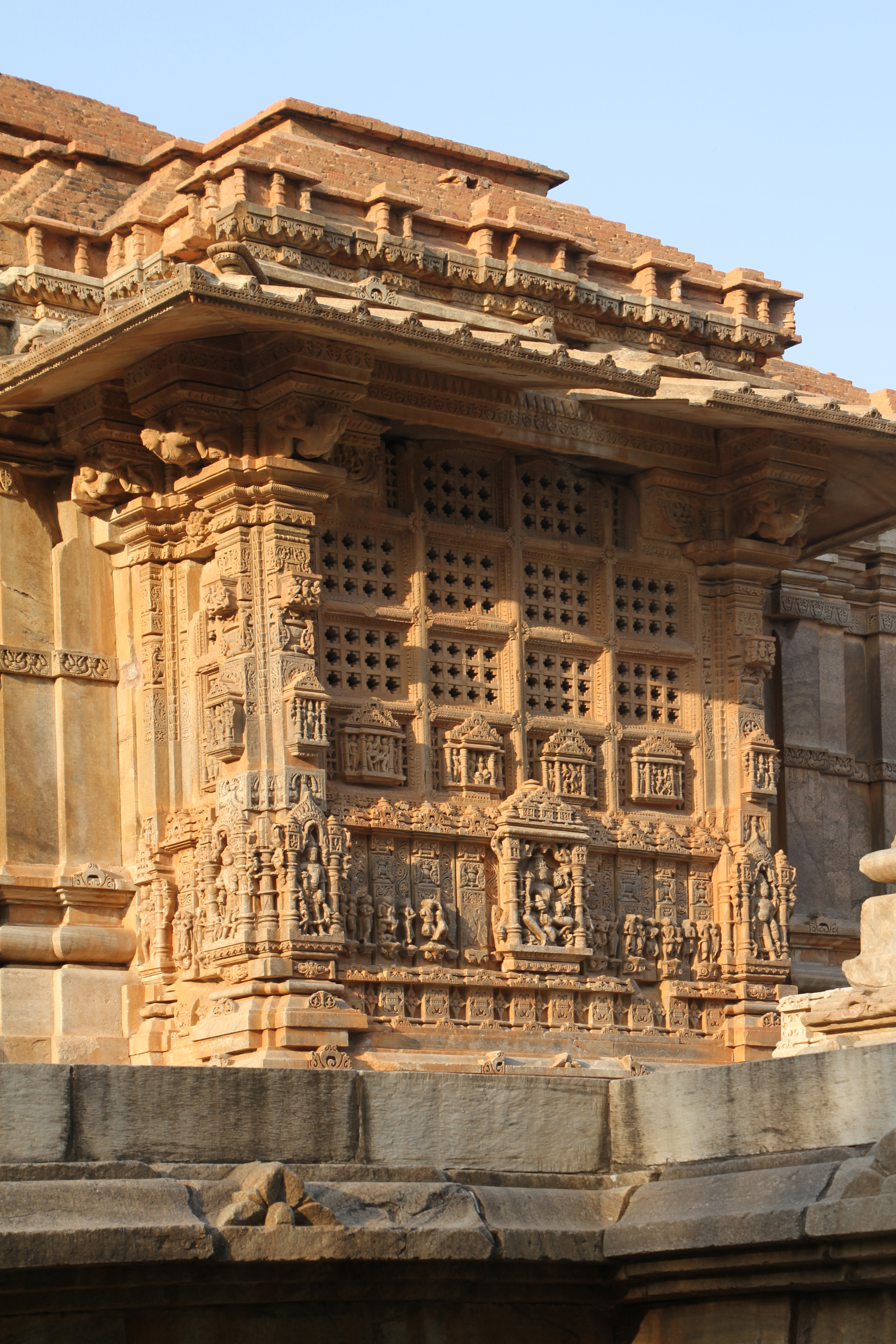
Part of temple 2

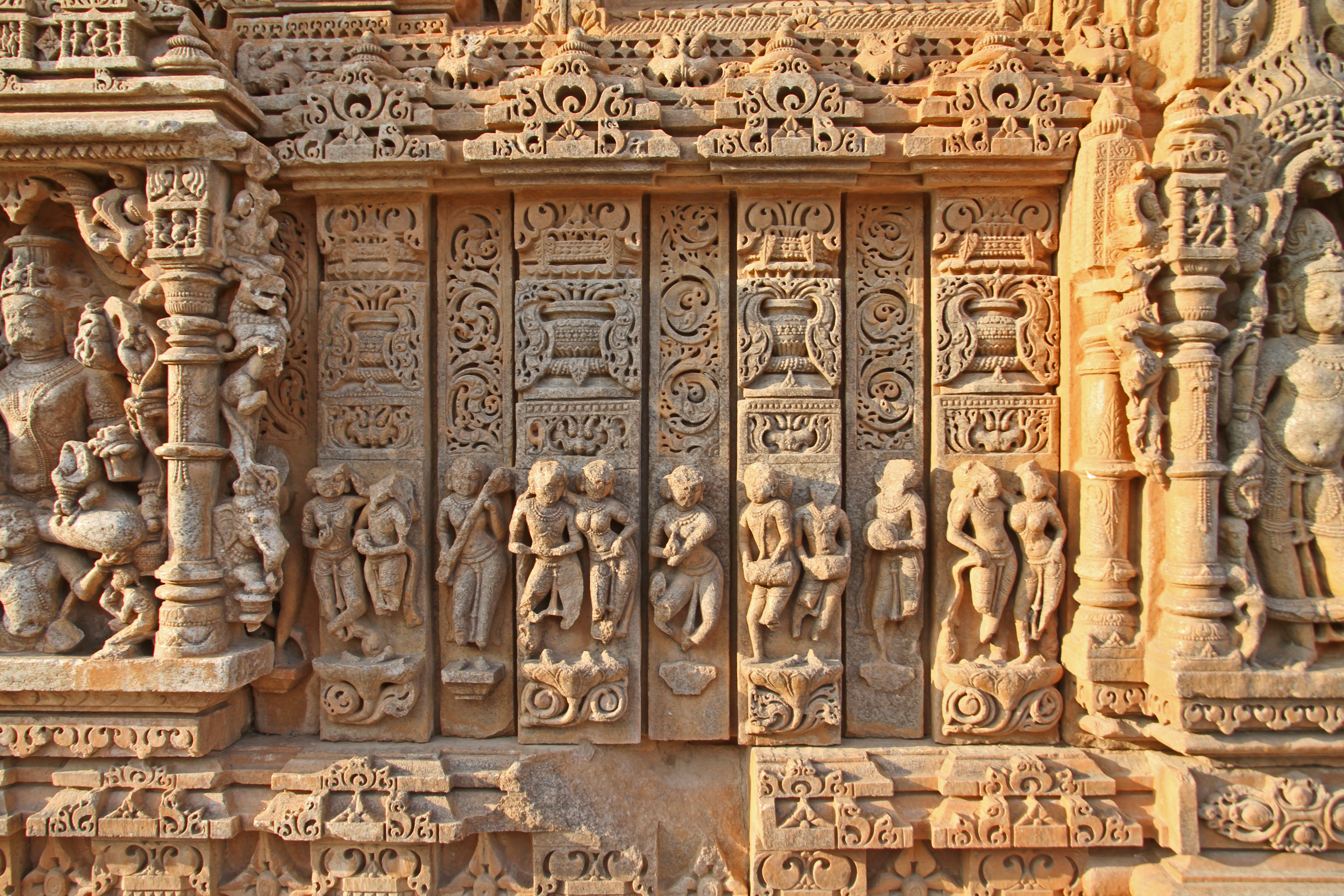
Reliefs on temple 2

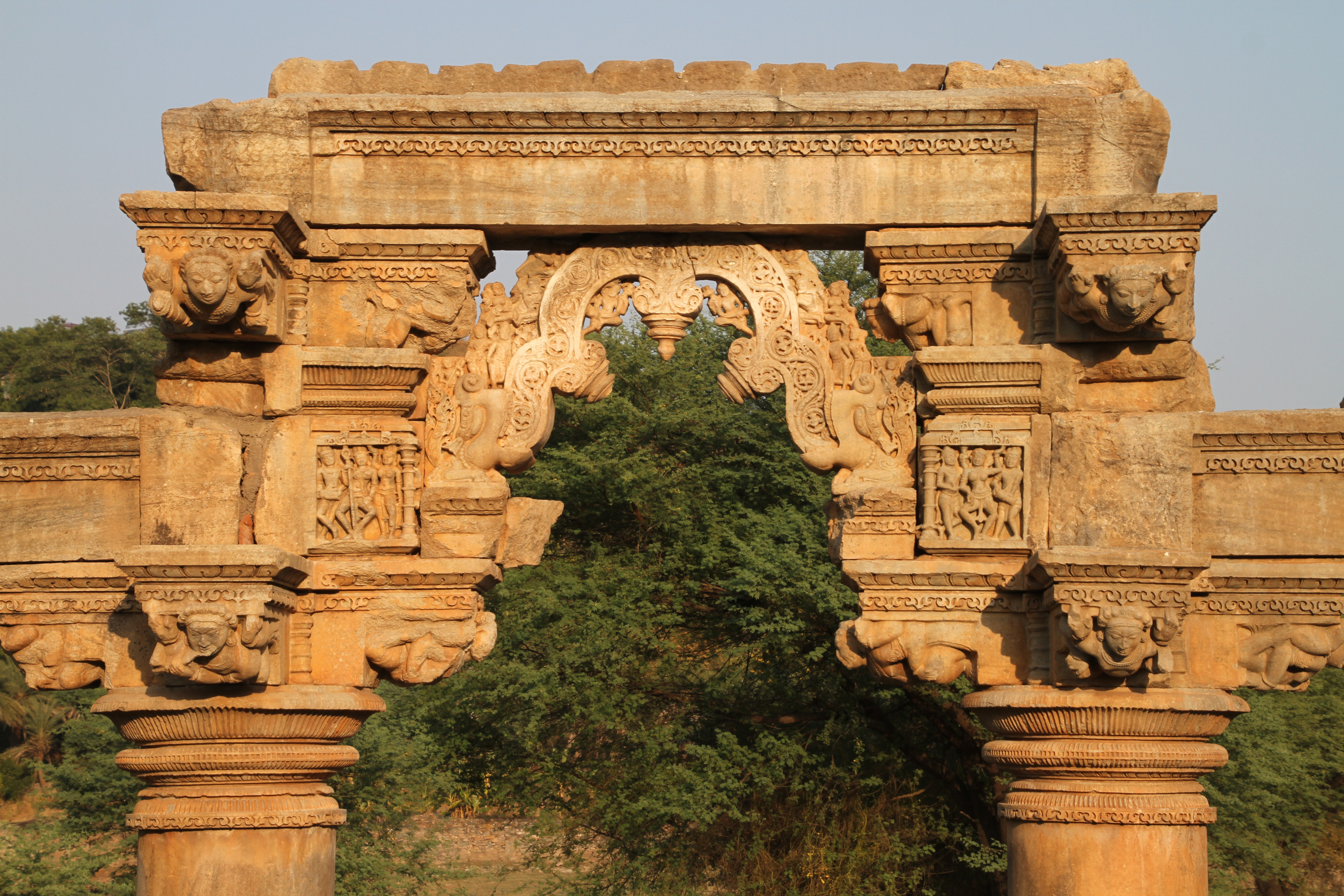
Gate
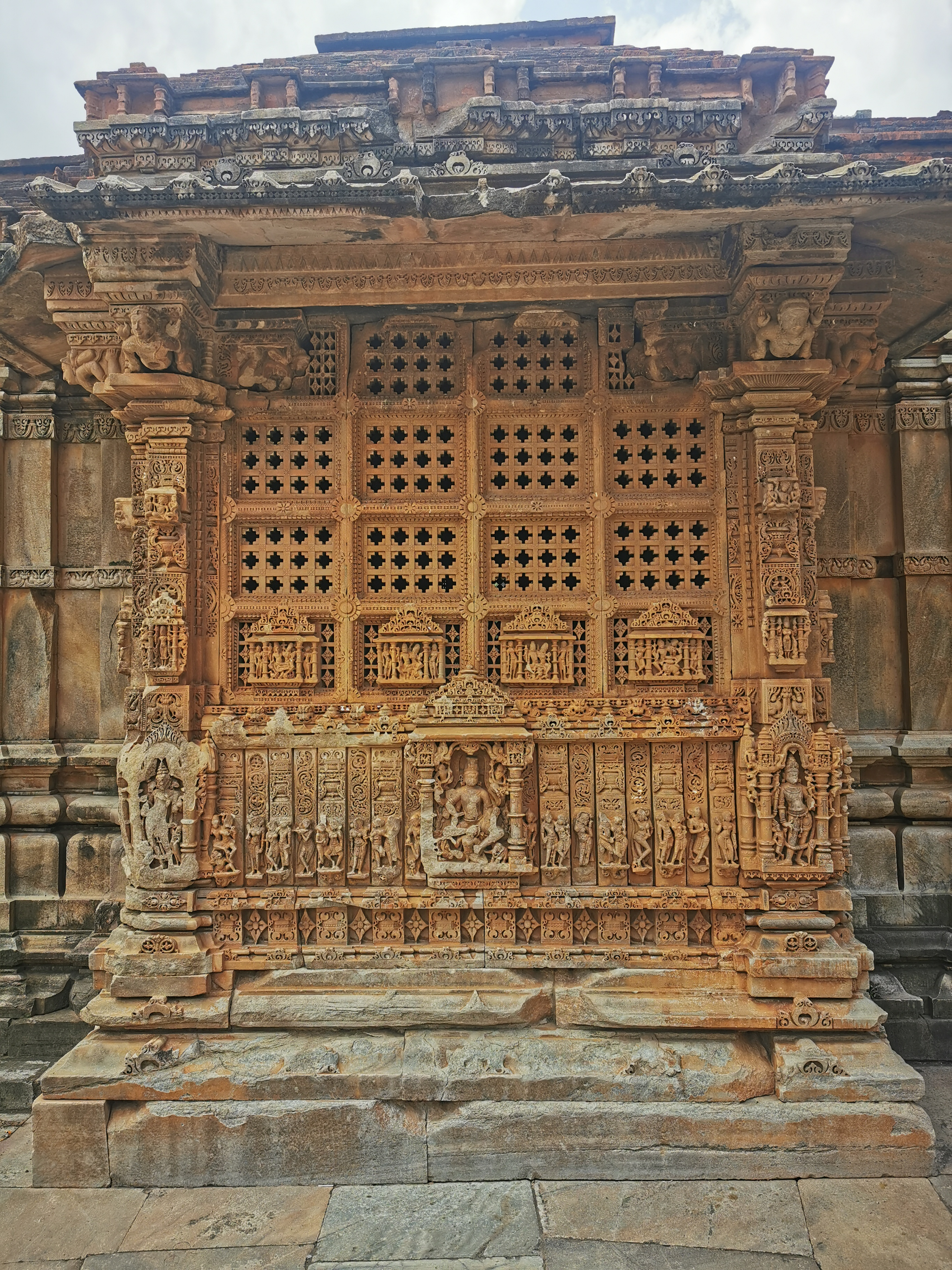
Relief on Temple 2

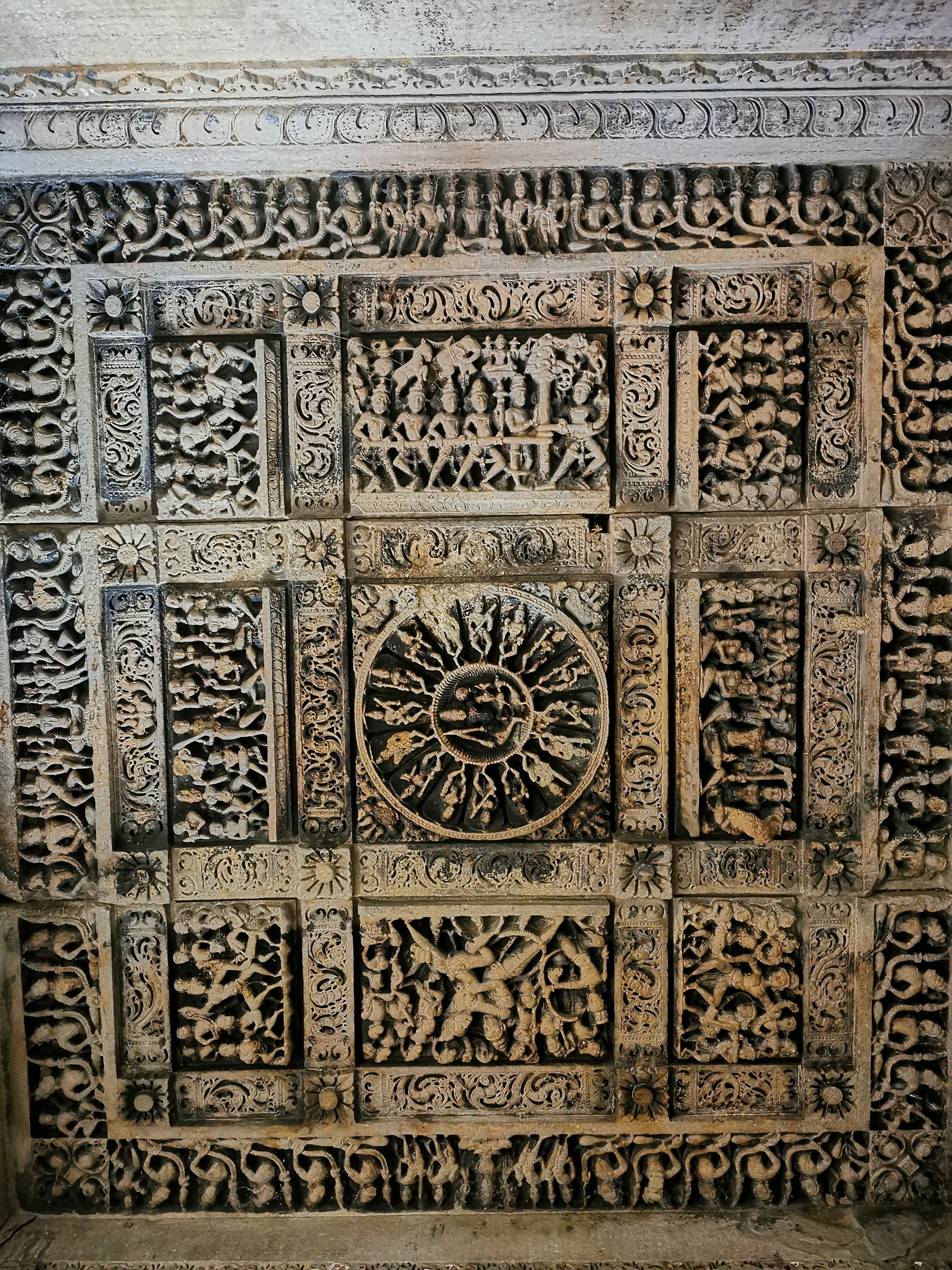

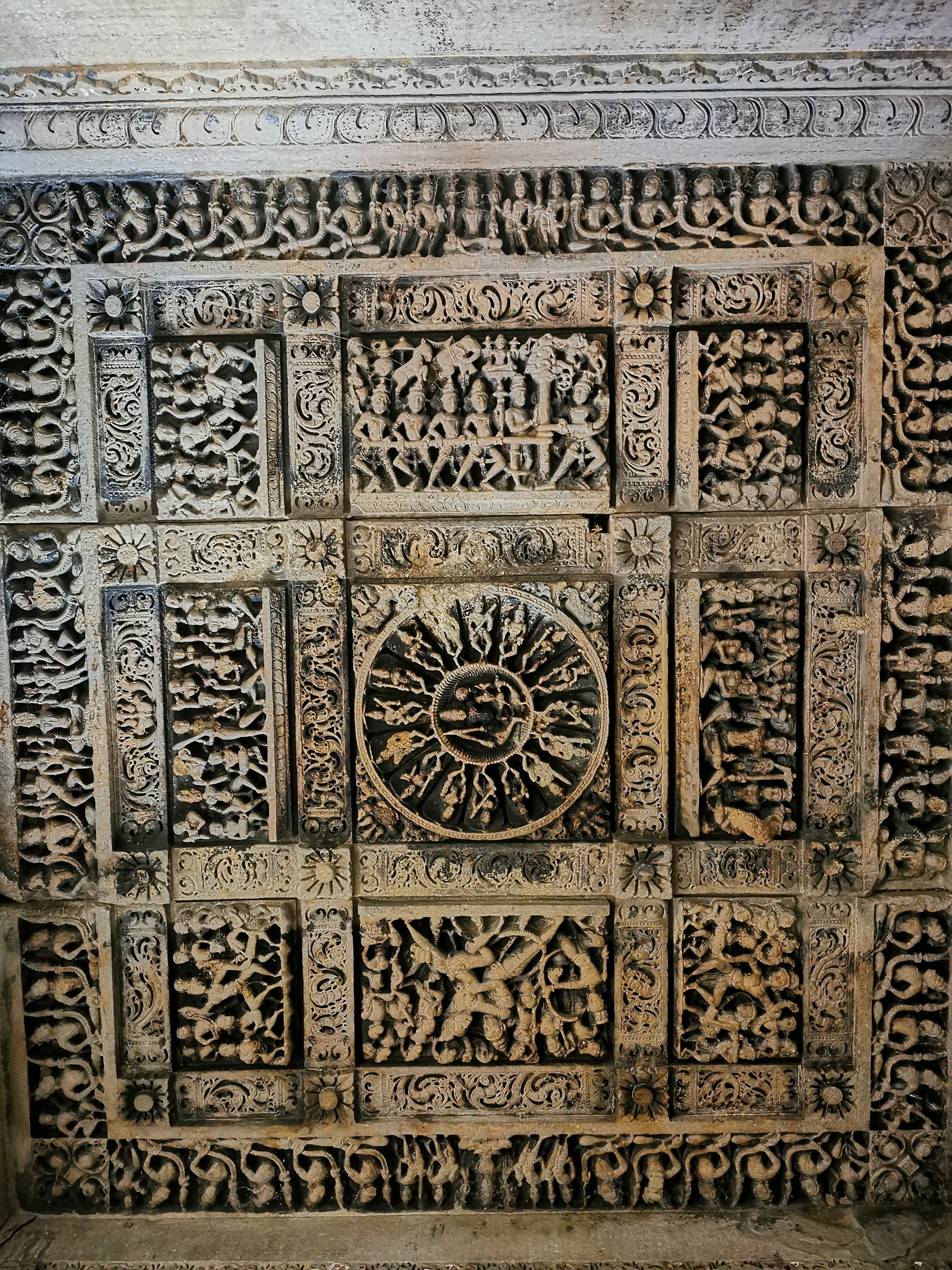
Carving on ceiling of temple 2

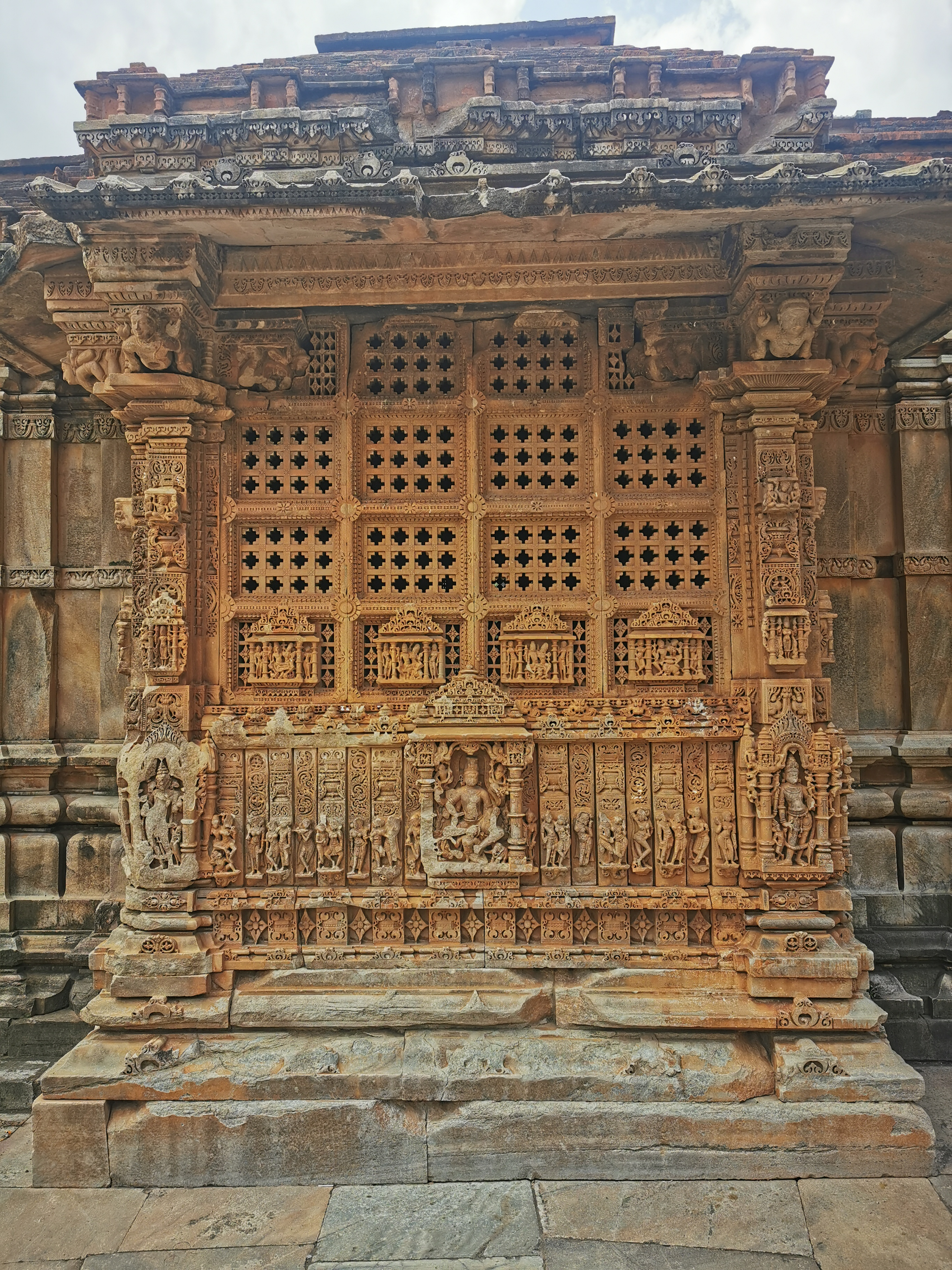
Reliefs on temple 2

== Spelling confusion ==
Sahasra is the correct prefix that means "a thousand", not SahasTra. However, it is invariably misspelled as the latter. Notice how the same prefix is spelled when referring to the crown chakra: "Sahasrara Chakra" or when it occurs in family names (example: Sahasrabuddhe) without a T. Also see Sahasralinga. The confusion arises because the Devanagari letter "sa" (स) merges with "ra" (र) to make "sra" (स्र), which looks like "stra" (स्त्र).
