= Jaipur International Airport =

Airport serving Jaipur, Rajasthan, India

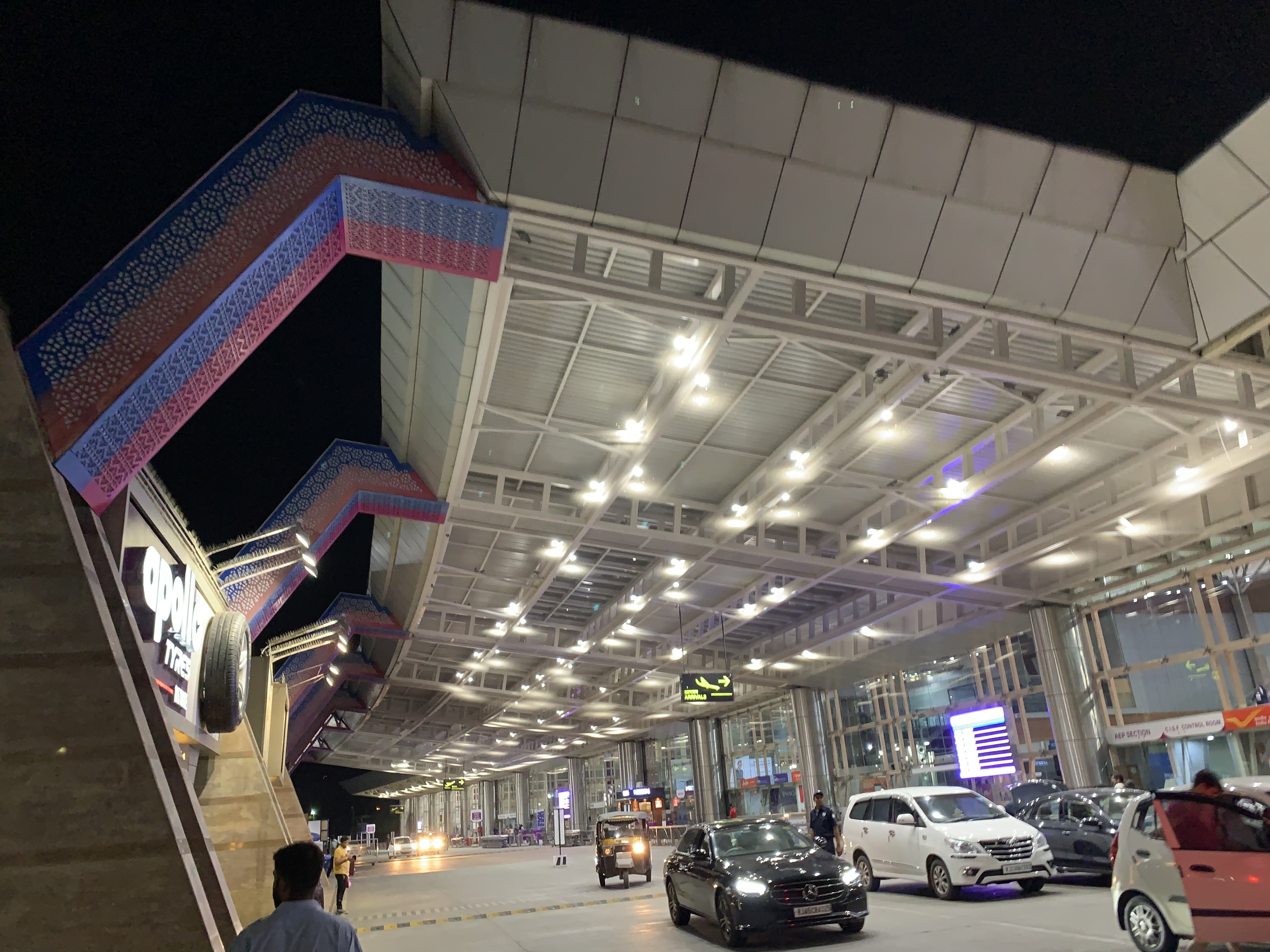
- IATA: JAI; ICAO: VIJP

Summary
- Airport type: Public
- Owner: Airports Authority of India
- Operator: Jaipur International Airport Limited
- Serves: Jaipur
- Location: Sanganer, Jaipur, Rajasthan, India
- Focus city for: Air India Express; IndiGo
- Elevation AMSL: 1,268 ft (386 m)
- Coordinates: 26°49′27″N 075°48′44″E
- Website: adani.com/jaipur-airport

Maps
- Location within Jaipur Location within Rajasthan Location within India

Runways
Direction	Length		Surface
Direction	m	ft	Surface
08/26	3,407	11,178	Concrete/Asphalt

Statistics (April 2025 - March 2026)
- Passengers: 5,627,147 (▼7.1%)
- Aircraft movement: 43,629 (▼9.9%)
- Cargo tonnage: 28,039 (▲28.8%)
- Source: AAI

Jaipur International Airport (IATA: JAI, ICAO: VIJP) is an international airport serving Jaipur, the capital of Rajasthan. It is located in the southern suburb of Sanganer, located about 10 km (6.2 mi) from the city centre. It is the 13th-busiest airport in India in daily scheduled flight operations.

== History ==
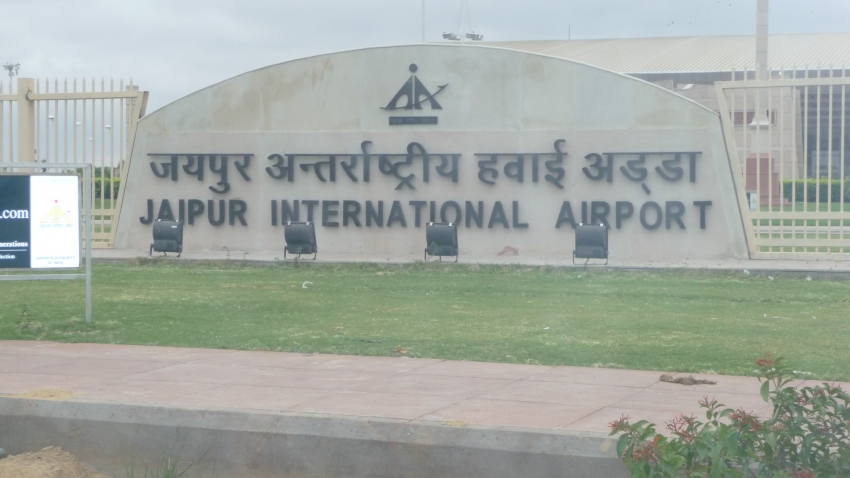
Name board for the airport

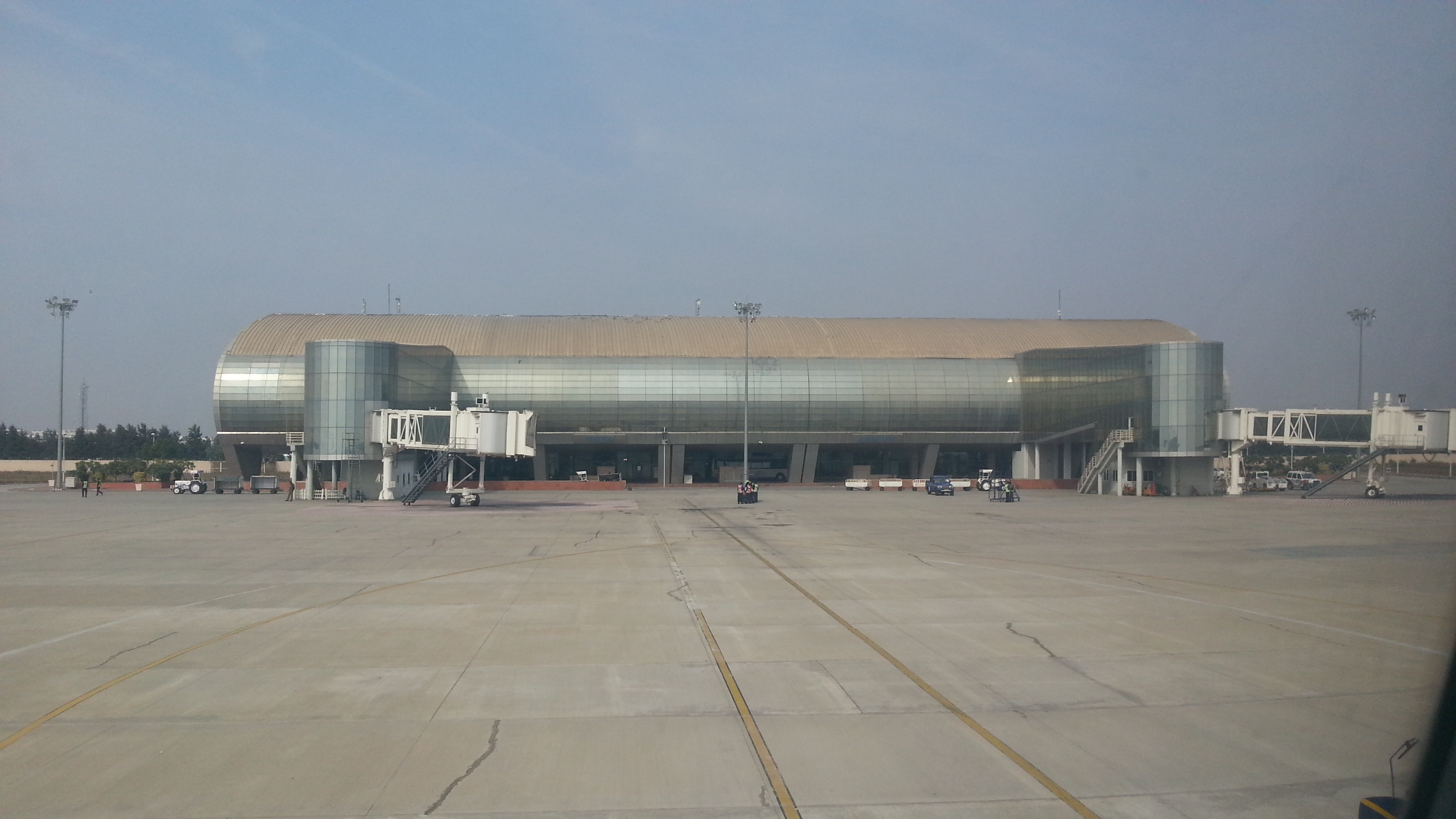
Jaipur International Airport's Terminal 2, seen from the apron side

On 29 December 2005, the airport was granted the status of international airport. The airport's apron can accommodate 14 aircraft, and the new integrated terminal building can handle up to 1,000 passengers at peak hours.

On 1 July 2009, the second terminal was inaugurated, and further expanded in 2019 when its runway width was expanded by around 20 meters on each side, a new hall was built in the departure area, and three conveyor belts and 2 new aerobridges were installed.

Between 2018-24, T1 was upgraded, floor area was expanded from 10,000 to 18,000 square meters and redesigned to reflect traditional Rajasthani architecture.

2016 plan to construct a new greenfield airport for Jaipur at different location just outside the Jaipur Ring Road at Shivdaspura, was abandoned in May 2023 due to the lack of viability and the acquired land was used for developing an economic hub.

== Terminals ==
=== Terminal T1: International ===
T1, being exclusively used as the international terminal. T1 opens on the complete opposite side to T2 as seen in map.

=== Terminal T2: Domestic ===
T2, used exclusively as the domestic terminal, has 22,950 square metres (247,000 sq ft) area, 14 airport check-in counters, four security counters, central heating system, central air conditioning, an inline x-ray baggage inspection system integrated with the departure conveyor system, baggage claim carousels, escalators, public address system, flight information display system, CCTV for surveillance, airport check-in counters with Common Use Terminal Equipment (CUTE), car parking, etc. The domestic terminal building, built in Rajasthani architecture with sandstone and Dholpur stone, has a peak hour passenger handling capacity of 500 passengers and an annual handling capacity of 400,000. It has three VIP lounges.

=== Terminal T3: proposed ===
A 2018 plan for expansion, which envisaged annual passenger growth from 5 million passengers to over 10 million by 2023, a new passenger terminal T3 on 1.25 lakh square meters area was expected to be completed by 2026/27. It is yet to see any progress as of July 2026.

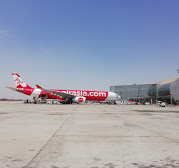
An AirAsia X A330 at Jaipur International Airport

== Airlines and destinations ==
Airlines	Destinations
Air Arabia	Sharjah
Air India	Delhi
Air India Express	Bengaluru, Delhi, Guwahati, Mumbai, Sharjah, Varanasi
Akasa Air	Bengaluru, Mumbai
Alliance Air	Delhi, Hisar, Kullu
Etihad Airways	Abu Dhabi
IndiGo	Ahmedabad, Bareilly, Bhopal, Chandigarh, Dehradun, Delhi, Dharamshala, Guwahati, Goa–Mopa, Jaisalmer, Jodhpur, Lucknow, Kolkata, Navi Mumbai, Noida, Pantnagar
SalamAir	Muscat
SpiceJet	Ahmedabad, Pune, Seasonal: Prayagraj
Thai AirAsia	Bangkok–Don Mueang

=== Top destinations ===
Busiest domestic routes from Jaipur International Airport, FY 2024–25
Rank	Destination (IATA)	Passengers (2024–25)	Main airlines
1	Mumbai (BOM)	1,205,825	IndiGo; Air India Express; Akasa Air; Air India
2	Bengaluru (BLR)	734,649	IndiGo; Air India Express
3	Delhi (DEL)	598,337	IndiGo; Air India Express; Akasa Air; SpiceJet
4	Hyderabad (HYD)	566,528	IndiGo; Air India Express
5	Kolkata (CCU)	516,730	IndiGo, SpiceJet, Air India Express
6	Pune (PNQ)	284,415	IndiGo; Air India Express; SpiceJet
7	Chennai (MAA)	244,666	IndiGo
8	Ahmedabad (AMD)	229,341	IndiGo; Air India Express
9	Goa (GOX/GOI)	132,139	IndiGo; Akasa Air
10	Chandigarh (IXC)	131,649	IndiGo

== Facilities ==
=== Runway ===
The airport has also been used as a diversion airport for flights affected by winter fog in northern India. Its CAT III-B navigation system, approach lighting and runway visual range equipment allow aircraft operations during low-visibility conditions.

Runways at Jaipur International Airport
Runway number	Length	Width	Approach lights/ILS	Comments/citations
08/26	3,407 m (11,178 ft)	45 m (148 ft)	CAT III-B / CAT III-B	

== Awards ==
The airport was declared as the World's Best Airport in the category of 2 to 5 million passengers per annum three consecutive times in 2015, 2016 and 2018 by Airports Council International.

== Accidents and incidents ==
- On 18 February 1969, Douglas DC-3 VT-CJH of Indian Airlines crashed on take-off on a scheduled passenger flight. The aircraft was overloaded and take-off was either downwind or with a crosswind. All 30 people on board survived.
- On 5 January 2014, Flight AI-890 Airbus A320 VT-ESH of Air India from Imphal to Delhi via Guwahati was diverted to Jaipur Airport due to heavy fog in Delhi. The rear tire of the plane burst during landing, damaging the right wing. The plane received substantial damage and the aircraft was written off. All 173 passengers and six crew members survived.

== See also ==
- Airports in India
- List of busiest airports in India by passenger traffic
