= Jaipur Development Authority =

State agency in Rajasthan, India

- जयपुर विकास प्राधिकरण
- Logo of JDA

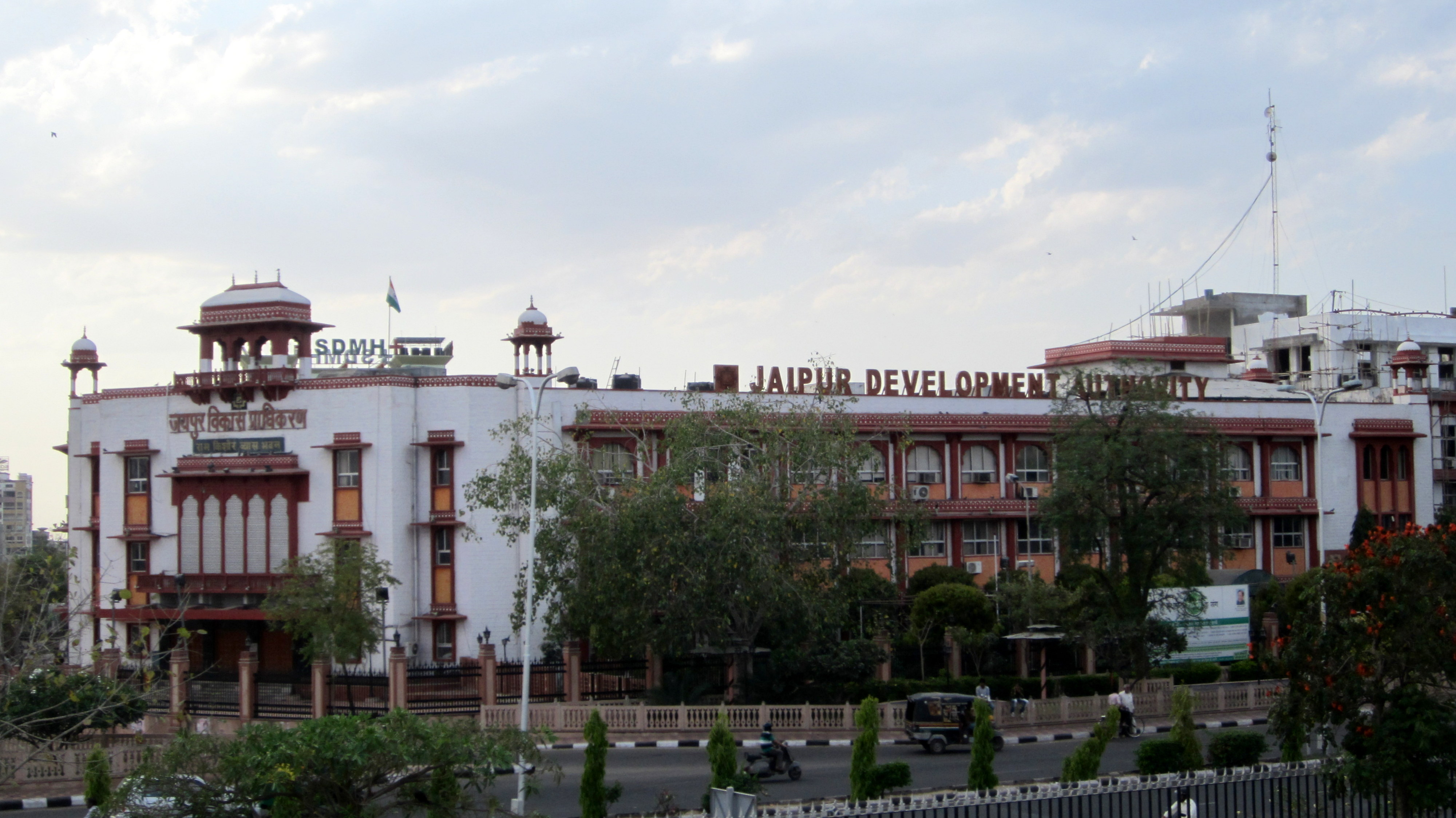
- JDA headquarters

Agency overview
- Formed: 5 August 1982; 43 years ago
- Type: City Planning Agency
- Jurisdiction: Jaipur
- Status: Active
- Headquarters: JLN Marg, Jaipur; 26.8928872°N 75.8141408°E
- Parent department: Urban Development and Housing
- Website: jda.urban.rajasthan.gov.in

Jaipur Development Authority (JDA) is the agency of the Government of Rajasthan responsible for preparation and implementation of master plan for the Jaipur city in Rajasthan state in India. It is engaged in infrastructural and basic amenity development for Jaipur and also environment conservation and development of rural areas around the city.

JDA has its head-office at JLN Marg, opposite the famous Birla Mandir, Jaipur.

== Projects ==
The Dravyavati River rejuvenation project was approved in 2015, awarded to a consortium of Tata Group and the Shanghai Urban Construction Group with an initial cost of over 131 crore Rupees to complete the work by October 2018. The estimated ten-year project cost, covering construction, operation and maintenance, was over 150 crore Rupees.

The Jaipur Ring Road project, first conceived of in 2000, is for a six-lane expressway encircling the Jaipur city. The contract, worth 900 crore Rupees, was awarded in May 2011.

== Criticism ==
Protests have taken place in Nindar against the compensation being offered for a proposed housing scheme. Farmers have been burying themselves neck-deep or going on hunger strike. The housing scheme is supposed to construct up to 10,000 homes.

The Dravyavati river is being constructed by capturing the private land of the poor farmers situated by the JDA at Goner village. The farmers are entitled to 25% compensation from the JDA in respect of this land, but JDA is constructing a Dravyavati river on the farmers land without paying any compensation to farmers. When the farmers ask for compensation from the JDA, they are intimidated by them and the JDA refused to compensate them by referring to the state government project (CM). The farmers resorted to the court with this attitude of the JDA and the court has taken stance that as long as the farmers will not get any compensation, JDA can not work on their private land. The JDA however has not ruled the court's order and its arbitrariness is being done. Despite the court's position, the JDA is (continuing) to make the Dravyavati river on the private land of farmers.

== See also ==
- Jaipur Municipal Corporation
- List of world's biggest cities
- [[Jaipur Development Authority (JDA New Scheme)]]
