= City wall of Jaipur =

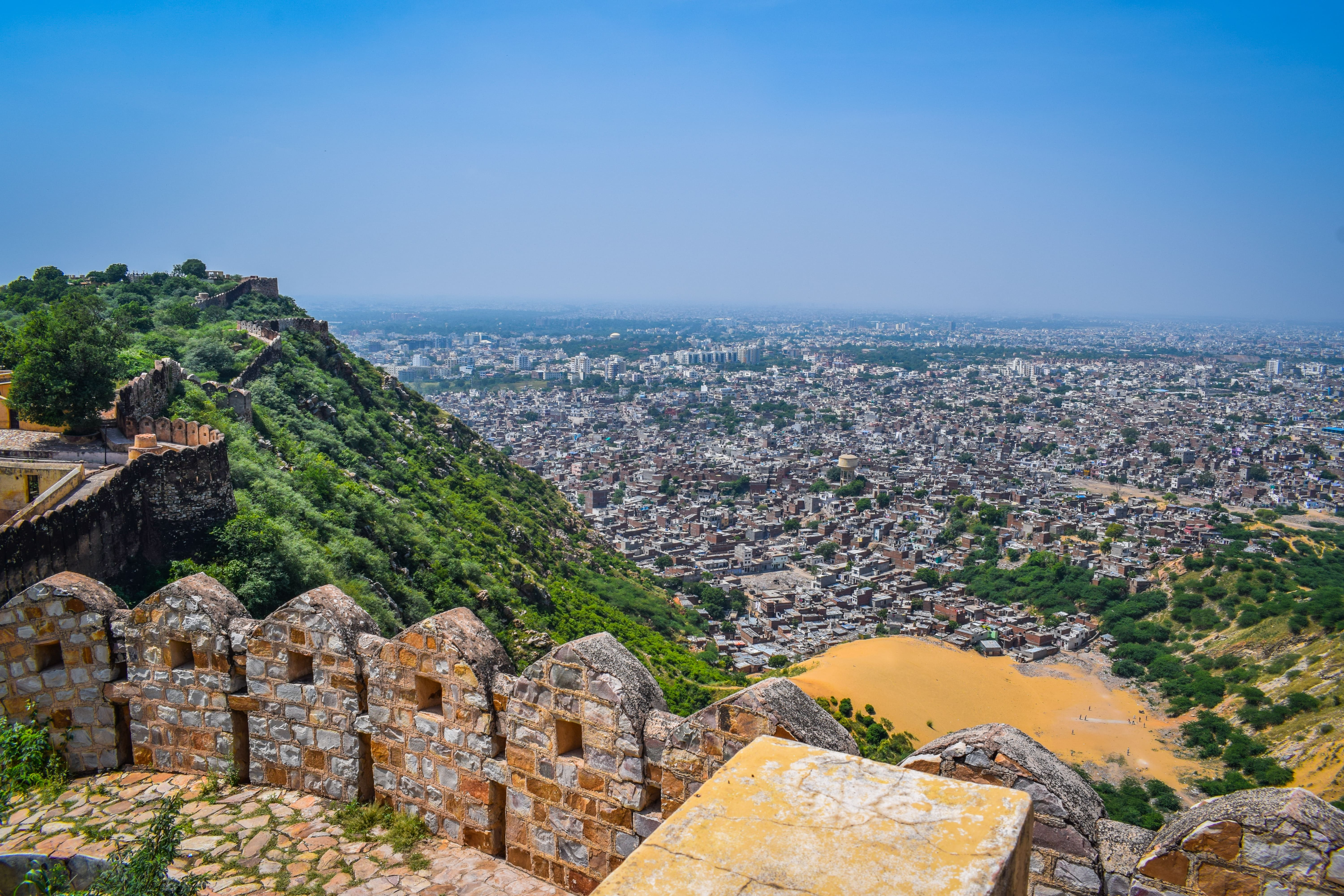
Aerial view of Walled City

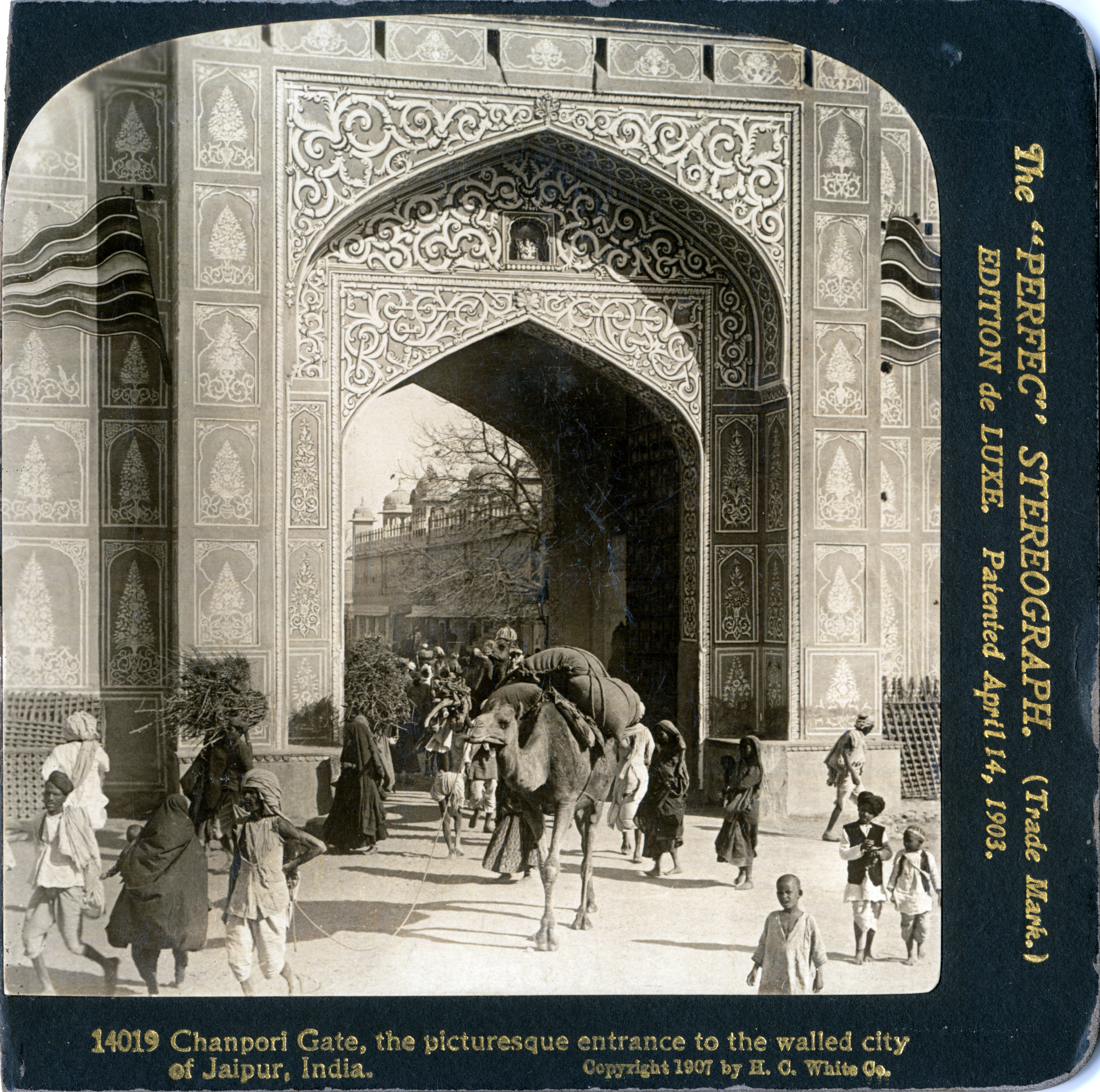
Jaipur walled city gate, 1907.

The Jaipur city wall, commonly known as the Parkota is the city wall encircling the old Jaipur city in Rajasthan state, India. It is a fortification that once safeguarded the planned city envisioned by Maharaja Sawai Jai Singh II in 1727. Built with traditional lime and brick techniques, the wall originally had seven grand gates and defined the urban identity of Jaipur for centuries. Today, the wall stands in a state of neglect, with over 3,100 encroachments, illegal constructions, and poorly executed repairs accelerating its deterioration. Heritage experts and historians have raised serious concerns, warning that the city risks losing its UNESCO World Heritage status if urgent conservation measures are not taken. Despite legal orders and repeated appeals, authorities have shown little action, allowing commercial expansion and urban pressure to override heritage preservation.

== History ==
Jaipur was founded in 1727 by Maharaja Sawai Jai Singh II as a new capital for the Kachwaha Rajputs. Unlike other cities in the region, Jaipur was deliberately planned on a flat terrain, utilizing a grid system inspired by Vastu Shastra, an ancient Indian architectural treatise. This planning was a departure from the organic growth patterns of medieval cities and was influenced by both Hindu and Mughal architectural principles. The construction of the city wall commenced shortly after the city's founding. The wall served multiple purposes, it acted as a defensive barrier against potential invasions, delineated the city's boundaries, and symbolized the power and foresight of the ruler. The fortifications were completed within a few years, coinciding with the rapid development of the city itself.

== Features ==
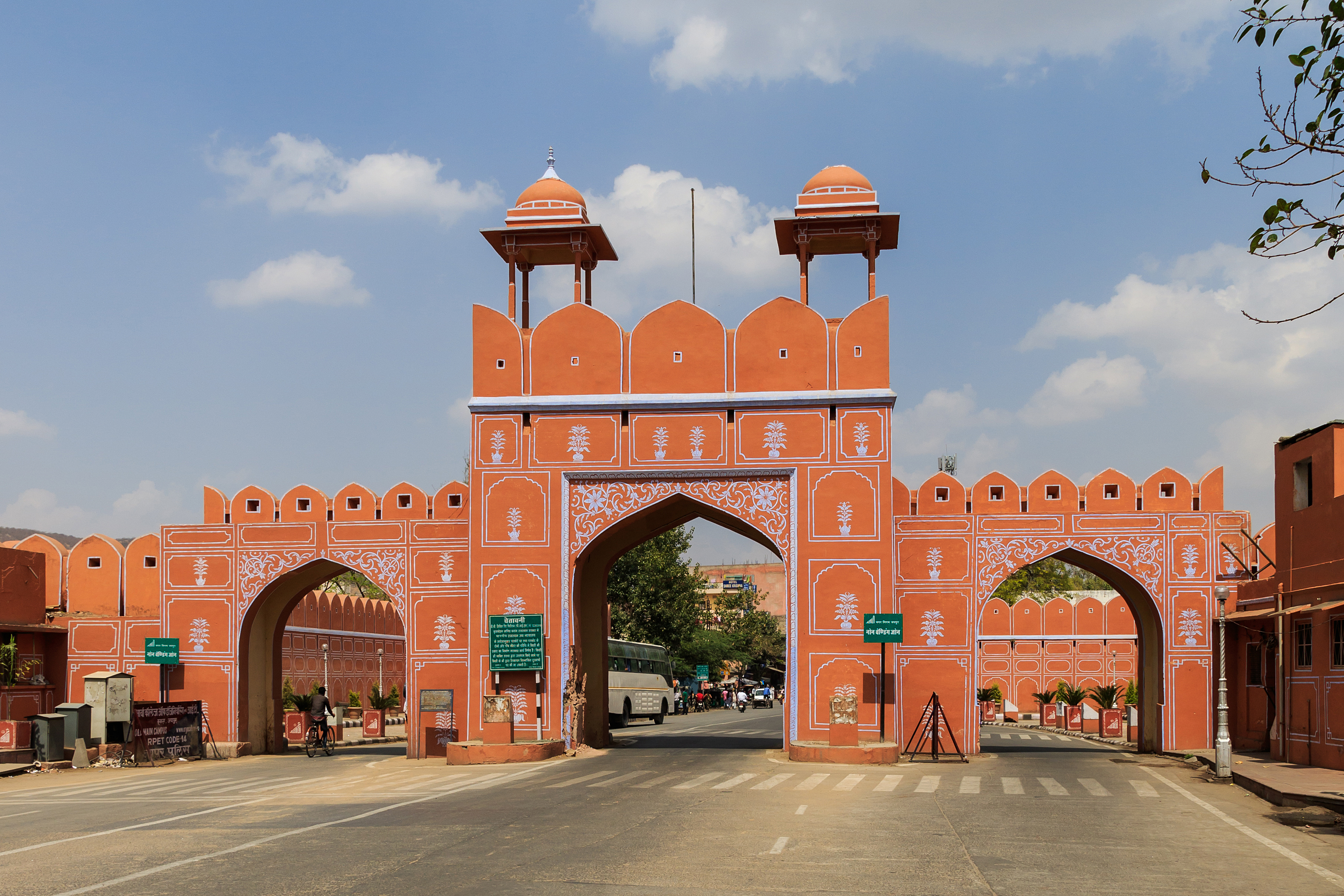
Zorawar Singh Gate

The City Wall of Jaipur is characterized by its robust construction and strategic design. The wall is approximately six meters high and three meters thick, constructed primarily from red sandstone, which is abundant in the region. The fortifications are punctuated by seven main gates, each serving as entry points into the city and reflecting the architectural styles prevalent during the 18th century.

The design of the wall and the gates was influenced by a blend of Hindu, Mughal, and Western architectural traditions. This fusion is evident in the ornate decorations, the use of arches and battlements, and the strategic placement of the gates to control access and provide vantage points for surveillance.

1. Chandpole Gate: Located on the western side, this gate was one of the main entry points into the city and is known for its distinctive architecture.
2. Surajpole Gate: Situated on the eastern side, it leads towards the Sun Temple and is associated with the direction of sunrise.
3. Ajmeri Gate: Positioned on the southern side, this gate faces towards Ajmer and was historically used for trade routes.
4. New Gate (Nayapole): A relatively newer addition, this gate was constructed to accommodate the growing traffic and trade activities.
5. Sanganeri Gate: Located on the southern side, it leads towards Sanganer, known for its block printing industry.
6. Ghat Gate: Situated on the northern side, this gate provides access to the Ghat area and is associated with water bodies.
7. Samrat Gate: Positioned on the western side, this gate is named after the Samrat Yantra, an astronomical instrument located nearby.

== Cultural Significance and Preservation ==
The City wall, or Parkota, inscribed as a UNESCO World Heritage Site in 2019, is now under severe threat due to rampant encroachments and negligent urban planning. A 2021 drone survey identified over 3,100 unauthorized structures along the ramparts. No substantial action has been taken by the authorities despite High Court directives. Historians have strongly criticized current restoration practices, noting that traditional lime plaster, once prepared using the durable Rahat method, has been replaced with substandard materials that deteriorate quickly. These repairs, combined with mushrooming illegal shops and apartment conversions, have left the structure discolored and unstable. Key historical elements such as Lakshmikund, Saraswati Kund, and Kali Kund have already vanished beneath modern construction, while the new Jaipur Metro cuts directly through heritage zones. They say that Jaipur risks losing its World Heritage tag, just as Liverpool did, if urgent preservation measures are not adopted. They emphasized the need for a dedicated conservation department, arguing that without immediate intervention, this centuries-old legacy of Sawai Jai Singh II will vanish from the landscape and survive only in books.
