= Khajoori Khas =

- Census town
- Location in India
- Coordinates: 28.70743°N 77.25993°E
- Country: India
- State: Delhi
- District: North East Delhi
- Lok Sabha Constituency: North East Delhi
- Vidhan Sabha Constituency: Karawal Nagar
- Founder: Anshu Kumari jha

Government
  - MP: Manoj Tiwari (BJP)
  - MLA: Kapil Mishra (AAP)

Population (2001)
  - Total: 45,090

Languages
  - Official: Hindi, English
- Time zone: UTC+5:30 (IST)
- PIN: 110094

Khajoori Khas is a census town in North East district in the Indian state of Delhi.

== Demographics ==
As of 2001 India census, Khajoori Khas had a population of 45,090. Males constituted 54% of the population and females 46%. Khajoori Khas had an average literacy rate of 57%, lower than the national average of 59.5%: male literacy was 60%, and female literacy 44%. 20% of the population was under 6 years of age.
