= Sadat Pur Gujran =

Sadat Pur extension satat pur pusta area
- city
- Nickname: sadat pur
- Location in India
- Coordinates: 28.72238°N 77.26295°E
- Country: India
- State: Delhi
- District: North East Delhi
- Lok Sabha Constituency: North East Delhi
- Vidhan Sabha Constituency: Karawal Nagar

Government
  - MP: Manoj Tiwari

Population (2019)
  - Total: 100,000Above
- Time zone: UTC+5:30 (IST)
- PIN: 110090

SadatPur extension is a census town in Biharipur in North East district in the Indian state of Delhi.

== About ==
As of 2001 India census, Sadat Pur Gujran had a population of 42,564. Males constitute 55% of the population and females 45%. Sadat Pur Gujran has an average literacy rate of 63%, higher than the national average of 59.5%: male literacy is 72%, and female literacy is 52%. In Sadat Pur Gujran, 20% of the population is under 6 years of age. The transport system, however, has faced issues due to road sewage. Furthermore, upcoming projects such as widening of the main Road, Delhi Metro and Signature bridge makes this area a very attractive investment destination. The demographics consists of a mix of high and low income brackets. Various residential welfare organizations are present to deal help vulnerable social classes.
