= Sonia Vihar =

- Neighbourhood of Delhi
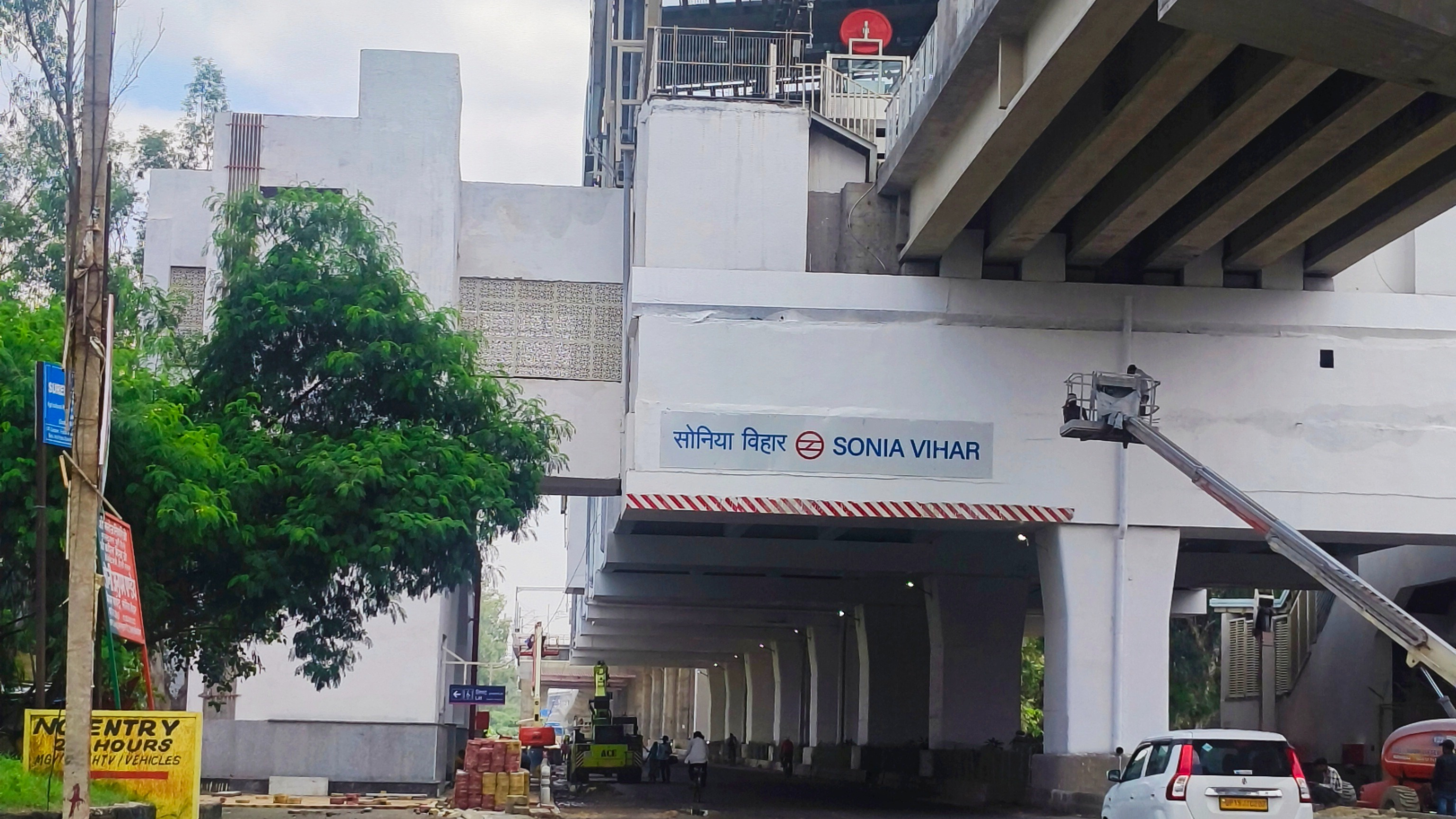
- Landmarks of Sonia Vihar Sonia Vihar Metro Station, Delhi

- Location in Delhi, India
- Coordinates: 28.70743°N 77.25993°E
- Country: India
- State: Delhi
- District: North East Delhi
- Established: 1980
- Founder: Ch. Dheer Singh
- Named for: Sonia Gandhi

Government
  - Type: Elected Representative
  - Body: Bharatiya Janata Party
  - MLA: Kapil Mishra
  - Member of Parliament: Manoj Tiwari
  - Councillor: Soni Anupam Pandey

Area
  - Total: 5 km^{2} (1.9 sq mi)
- Elevation: 200 m (660 ft)

Population (2011 Census of India)
  - Total: 700,000 (approx.)
  - Density: 140,000/km^{2} (360,000/sq mi)

Local Fact
  - Known Languages: Hindi, English, Garhwali, Bhojpuri
- Time zone: UTC+5:30 (IST)
- PIN: 110090,110094
- Vehicle registration: DL-5
- Nearest city: Tronica City, Ghaziabad (UP)
- Civic Agency: East Delhi Municipal Corporation
- Police Station: Sonia Vihar
- Lok Sabha Constituency: North East Delhi
- Vidhan Sabha Constituency: Karawal Nagar
- Metro Station: Sonia Vihar metro station ( Phase IV-Pink Line)
- Water Supply: Sonia Vihar Water Treatment Plant (operational since 2006, capacity 635 MLD)
- Website: www.Soniavihar.com

Sonia Vihar is a residential neighbourhood in the North East district of Delhi, India, situated on the eastern bank of the Yamuna River. The locality is divided into several phases and blocks and is bordered by Bhajanpura, Khajuri Khas, Wazirabad and Yamuna Vihar, with other nearby areas including Maujpur, Seelampur and Shahdara. Sonia Vihar lies approximately 9 km from Kashmiri Gate ISBT, 12 km from Anand Vihar ISBT, 10 km from the University of Delhi (North Campus), and about 14 km from Connaught Place, while the Indira Gandhi International Airport is located around 32 km from the area. The neighbourhood is notable for the Sonia Vihar Water Treatment Plant, a major facility in Delhi’s water supply system, and is connected to other parts of the city by road and the nearby Maujpur–Babarpur metro station on the Pink Line of the Delhi Metro.

== Geography and divisions ==
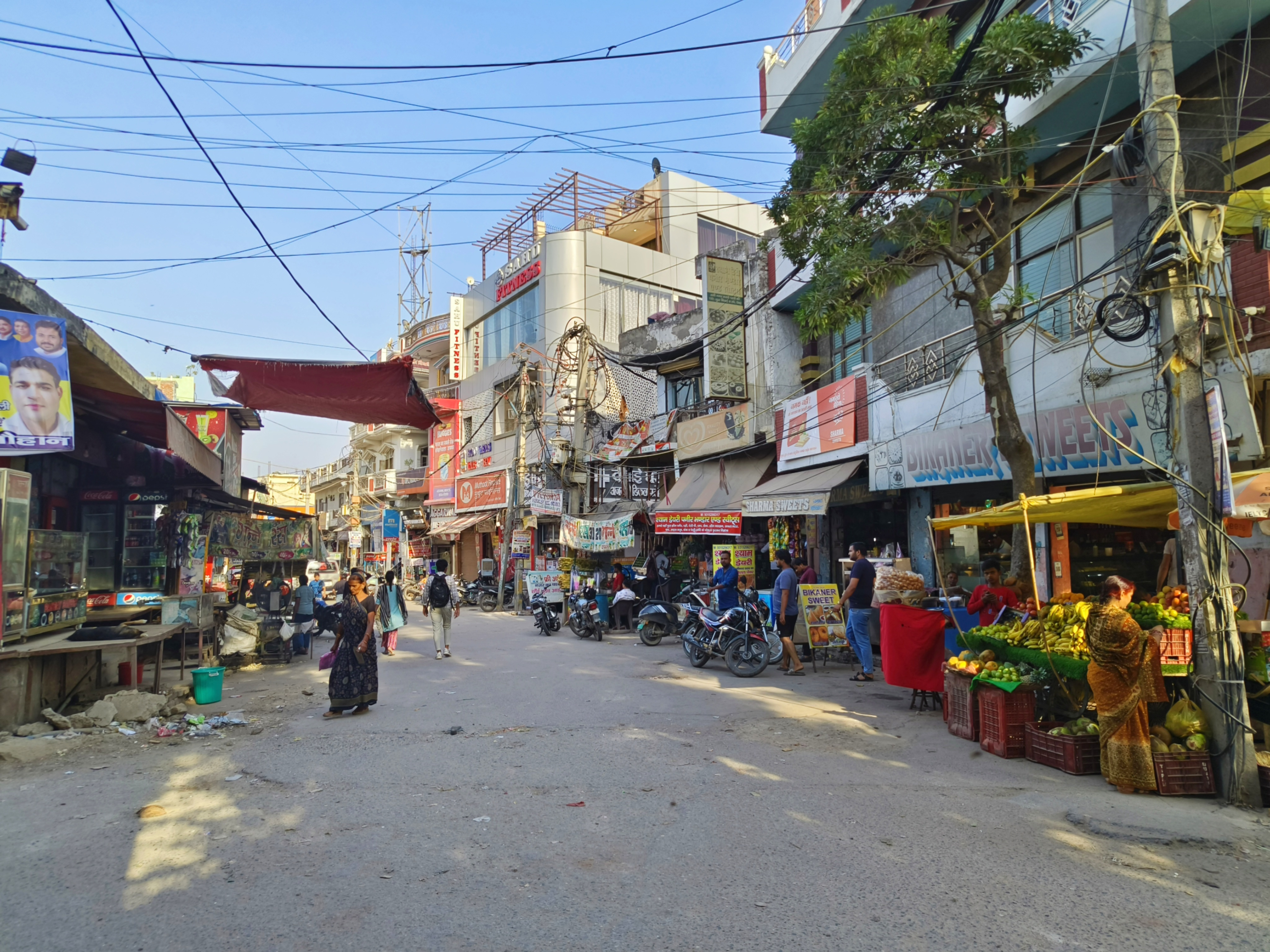
3rd Pusta Main Market

Sonia Vihar is organized into several Blocks, labeled A, B, C, D, E, F, and G. The G Block is further subdivided into G-1, G-2, G-3, and G-4. Additionally, the area is divided by the embankments, or Pustas, that run parallel to the Yamuna River. These are referred to as Zero Pusta, 1st Pusta, 2nd Pusta, 3rd Pusta, 4th Pusta, and 5th Pusta. It is located on the banks of the Yamuna River, which plays a vital role in the area’s water supply and ecological landscape.

== Demographics ==
Sonia Vihar is home to a diverse population, with residents hailing from various parts of India. A large proportion of the population comes from Uttarakhand, Bihar and eastern Uttar Pradesh, and the area has a mix of merchants, laborers, and clerks, along with professionals working in various sectors.

== Banking and postal services ==
Sonia Vihar has two nationalised bank branches: a branch of Punjab National Bank and a branch of Indian Bank. Several ATMs operated by these banks and other providers are available locally for cash withdrawals and basic banking services. Postal services are handled by a single India Post office in Sonia Vihar, which provides regular mail, Speed Post and parcel services to residents.

== Landmarks ==
The area is home to several noteworthy spots for leisure, shopping, and spirituality:

- Shyam Vatika and Rati Ram Vatika: Popular venues for weddings and events.
- Temples: Annapurna Temple, Balaji Mandir, Shri Aadi Shakti Balaji Sai Mandir, and Radha Swami Satsang Vyash are among the beloved spiritual places.

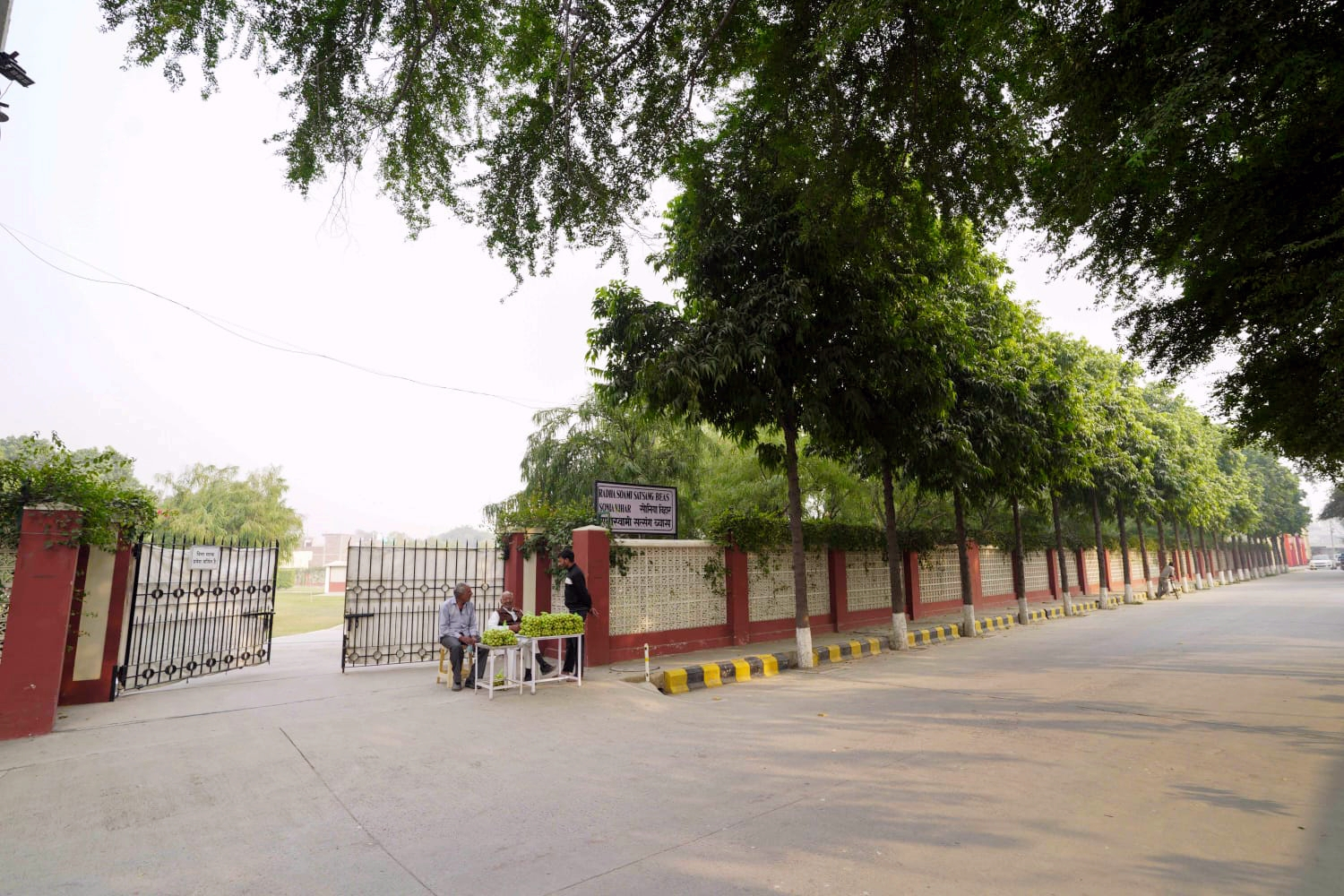
Radha-Swami Satsang Vyas, Sonia Vihar

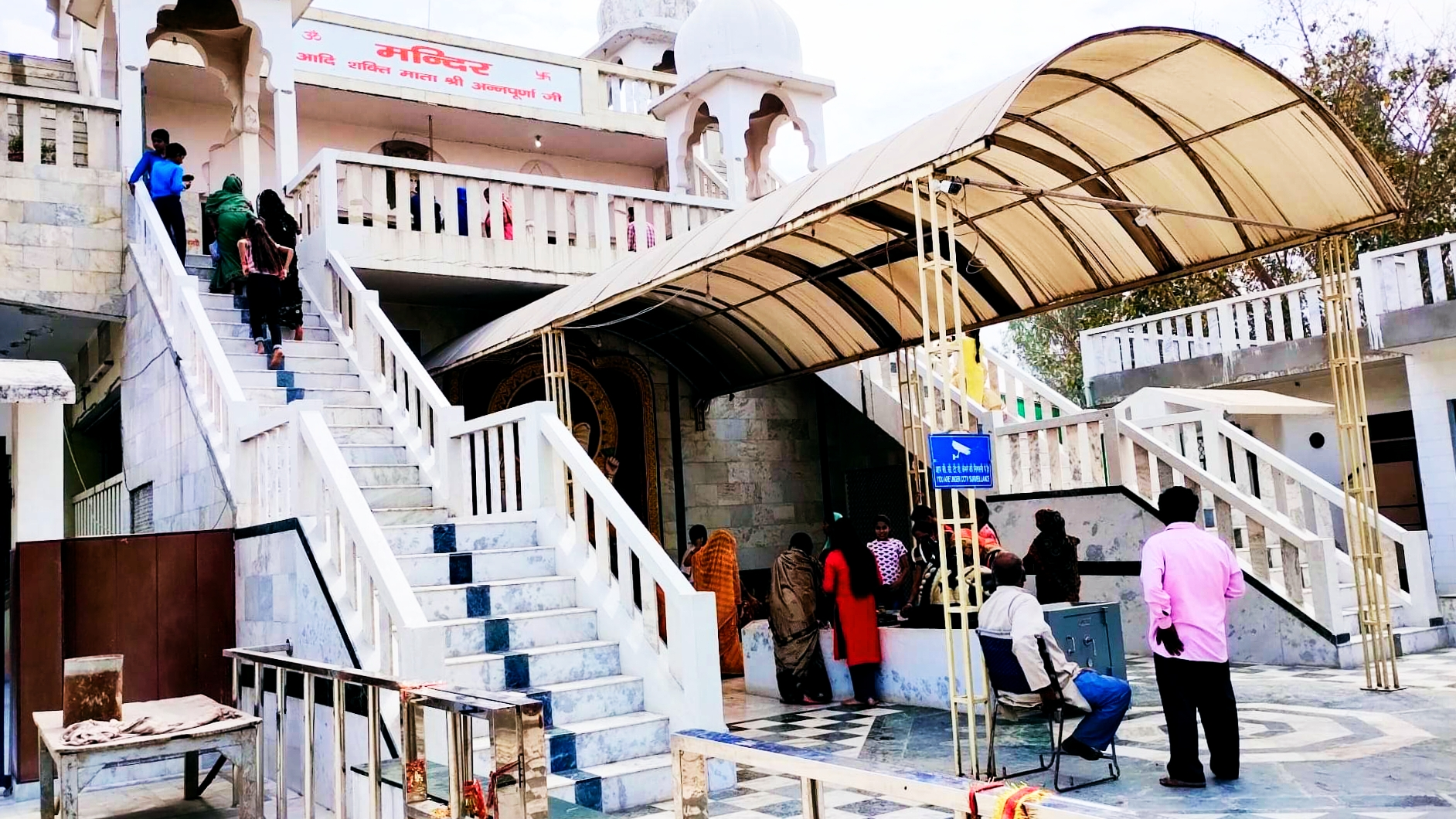
Maa Annapurna Mandir, Sonia Vihar

=== Parks and Recreation ===
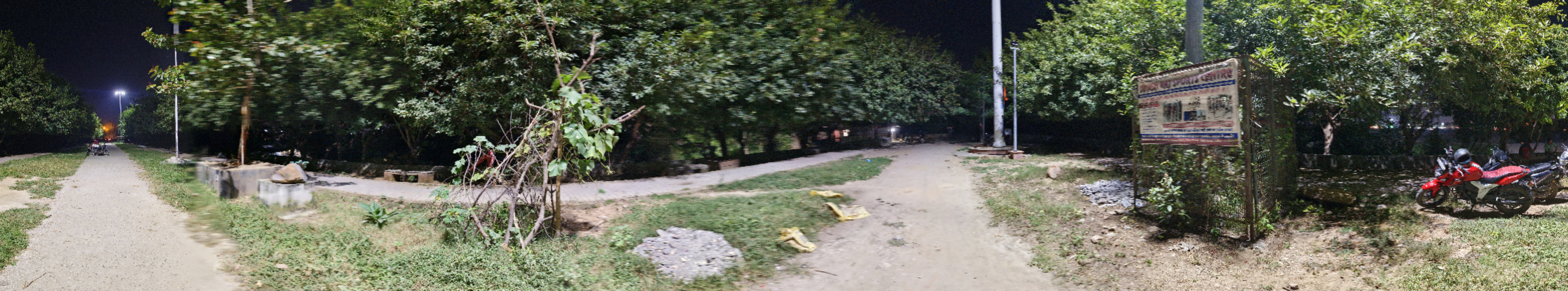
Panorama view of 3.5 Pusta Park, Sonia Vihar

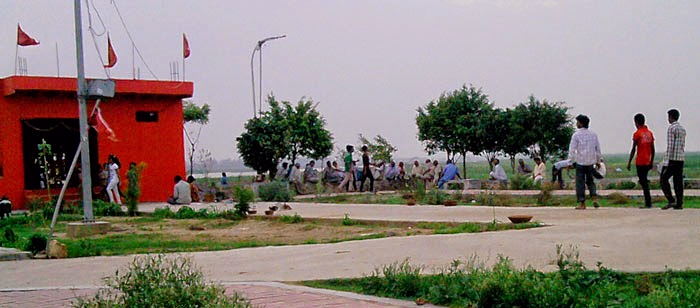
2nd Pusta Park, Sonia Vihar

Each Pusta in Sonia Vihar features parks that offer green spaces for leisure and community events. These parks serve as important recreational areas for residents.

=== Festivals ===
The residents of Sonia Vihar celebrate a wide variety of festivals throughout the year, reflecting the cultural diversity of the area. One of the most significant celebrations is Chhath Pooja, which takes place near the Yamuna River. Other religious and cultural festivals from various communities are also celebrated, contributing to the vibrant cultural fabric of the neighborhood.

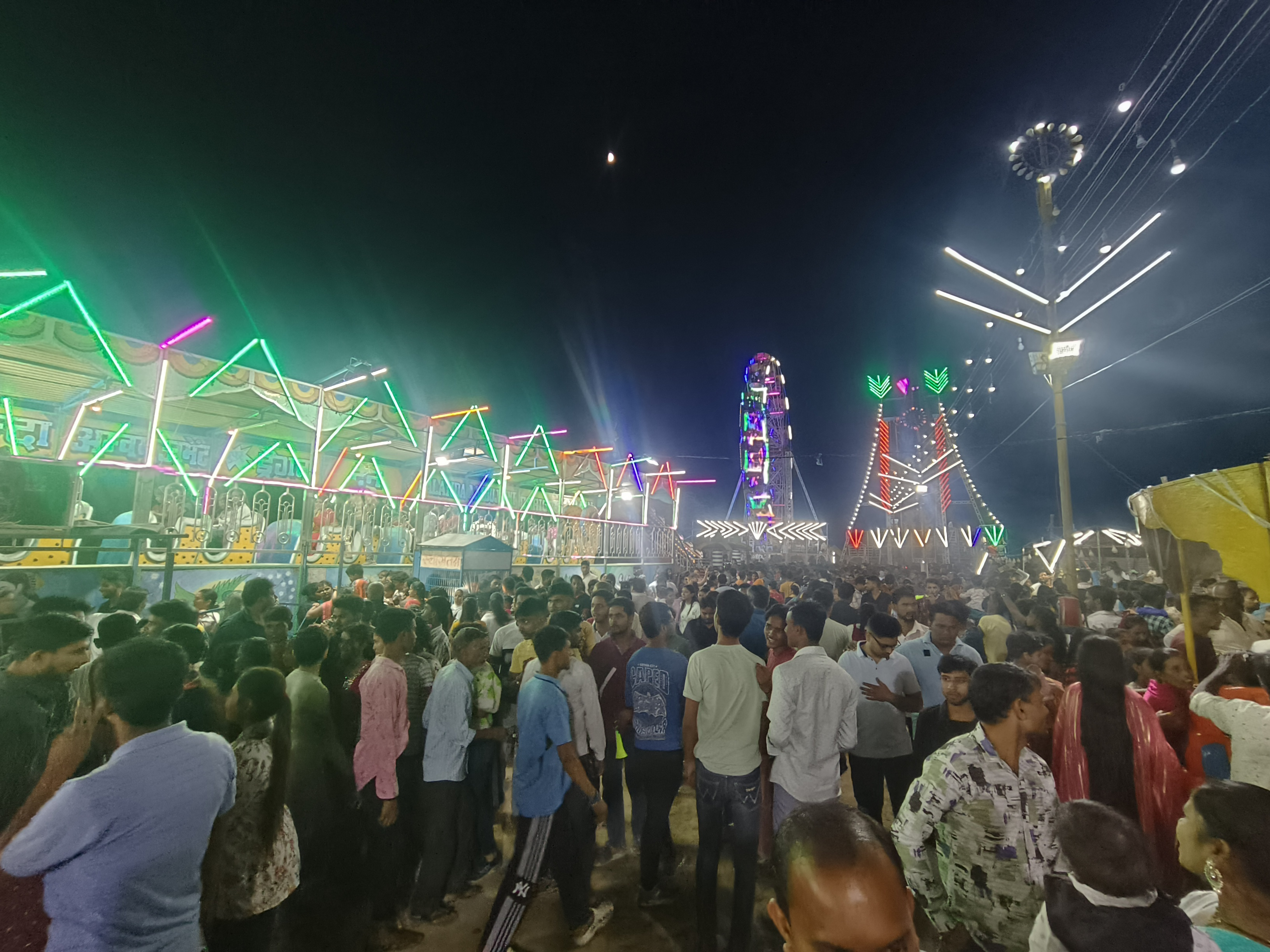
Dussehra Fair, Sonia Vihar

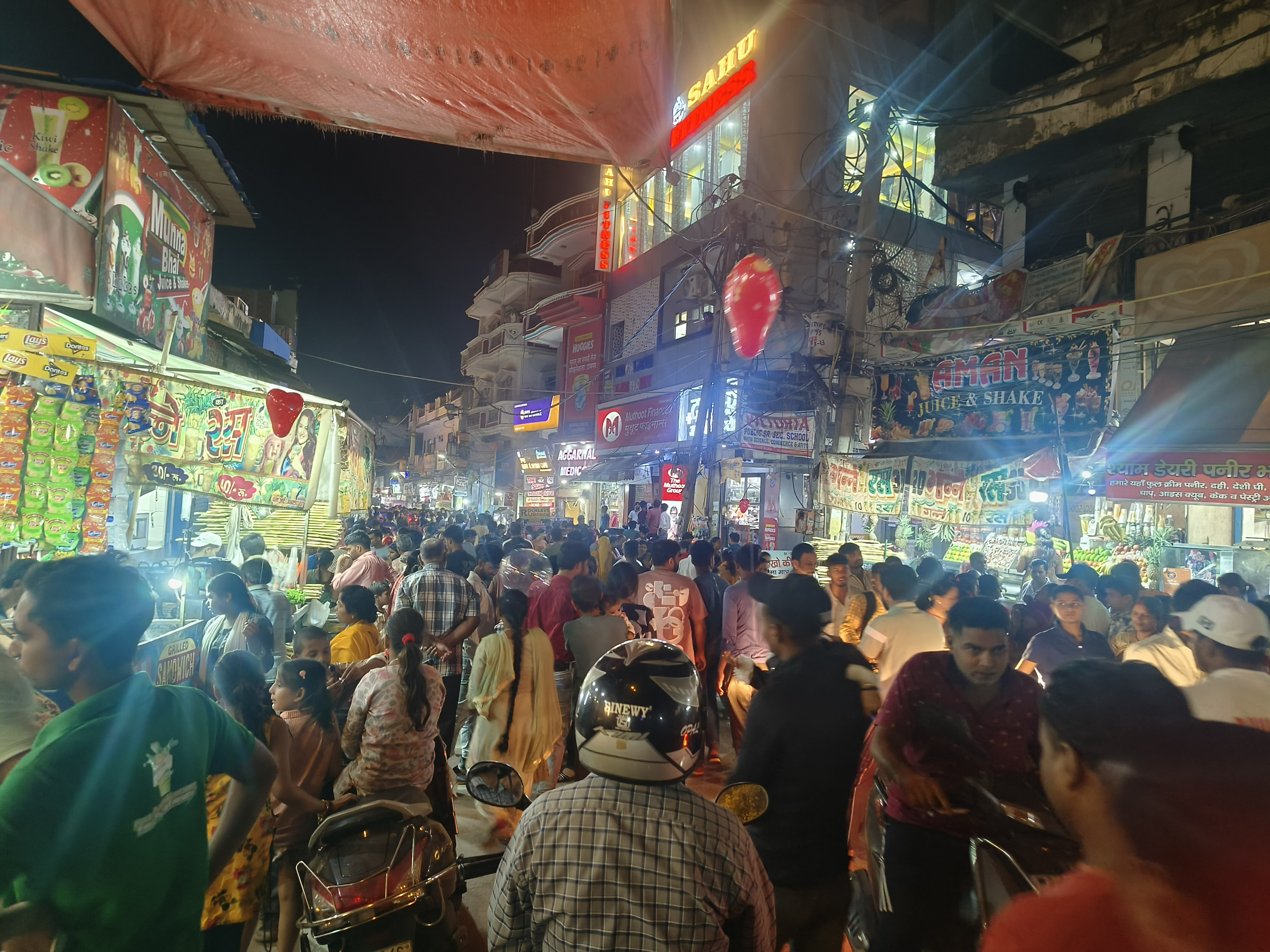
People Shopping for Navratri, Sonia Vihar

=== Marriage venues ===
Shyam Vatika, Rati Ram Vatika and Sundara Dharamshala are well-known marriage venues in the area, frequently used for weddings and other large social gatherings.

=== Sonia Vihar Police Station ===
Sonia Vihar Police Station serves the local community by handling law enforcement, managing public safety, and addressing local grievances. You can contact or visit the police station for assistance with legal issues, complaints, or emergencies in the Sonia Vihar locality.

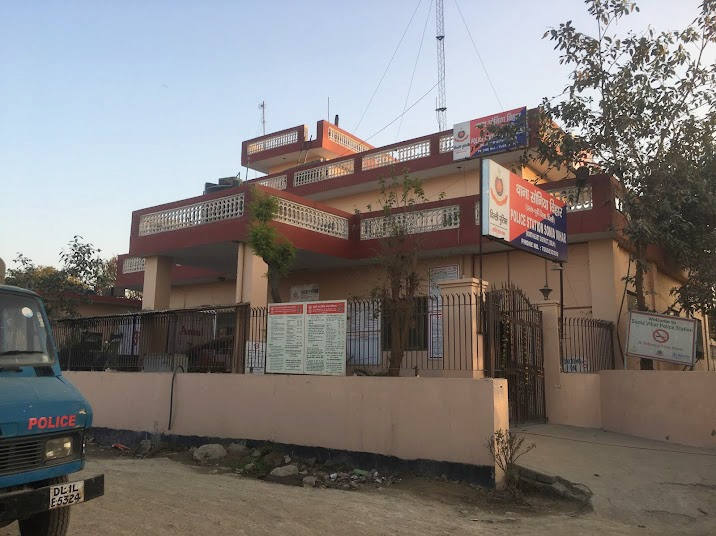
Police Station, Sonia Vihar

== Infrastructure ==
=== Water treatment plant ===
Sonia Vihar Water Treatment Plant is a crucial facility operated by the Delhi Jal Board located in the Sonia Vihar area of northeast Delhi. Established in 2006, the plant processes 140 MGD of water sourced from the Upper Ganga Canal. The facility plays a significant role in supplying potable water to various parts of Delhi, helping to meet the city's growing demand for clean drinking water. The treatment process ensures that the water is safe for consumption, contributing to public health and sanitation in the densely populated region.

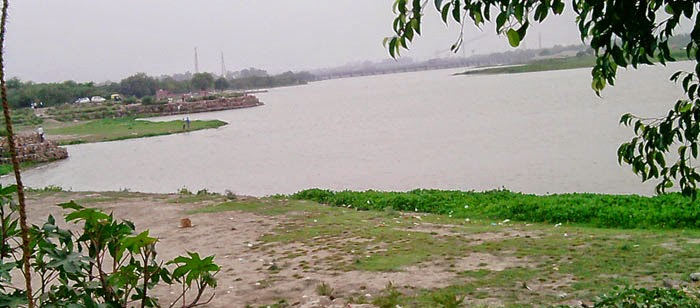
Embankment of River Yamuna in Sonia Vihar

== Sonia Vihar Metro Station ==
Sonia Vihar
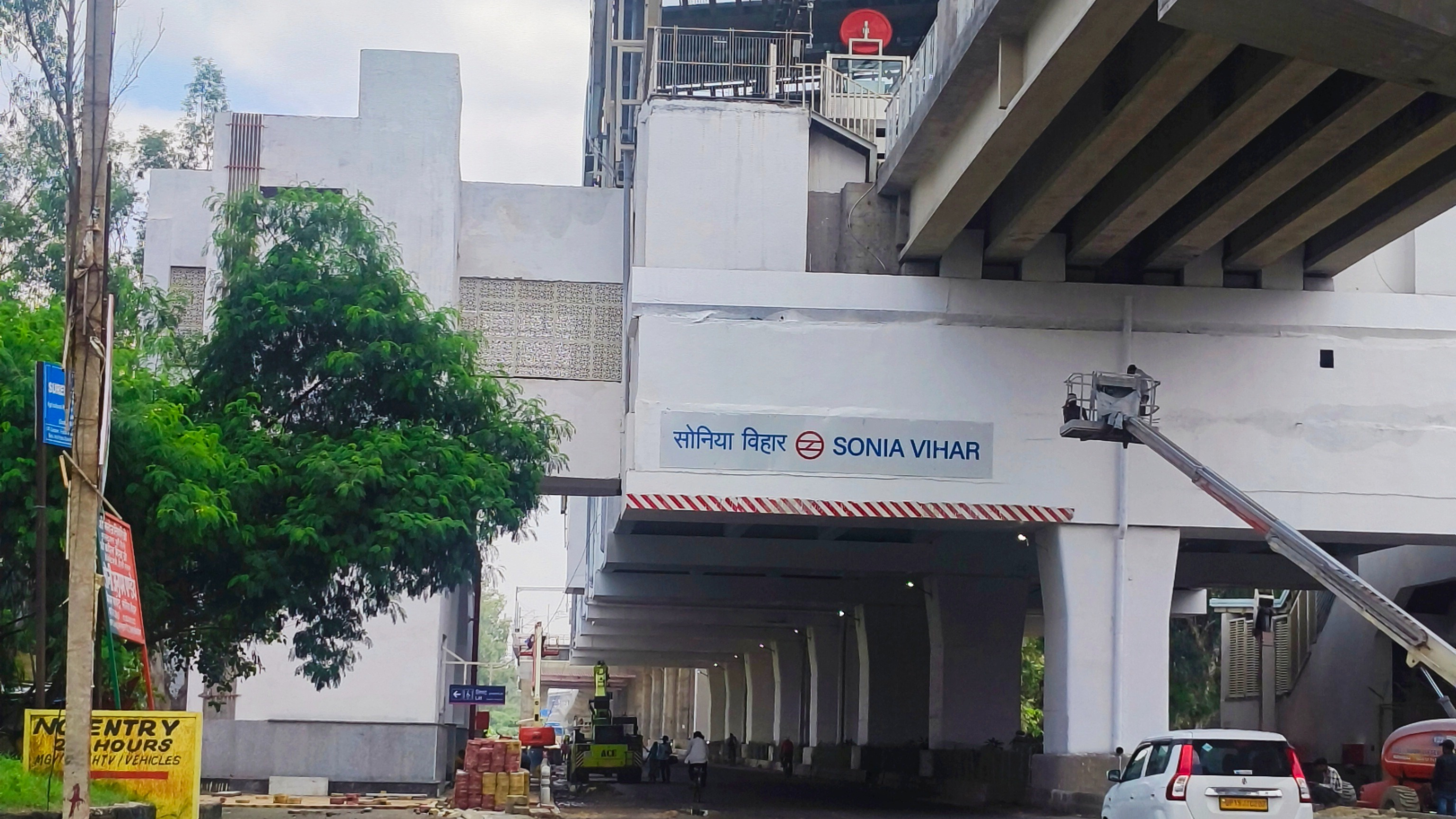

General information
- Location: Sonia Vihar, North East Delhi, Delhi-110090
- Owner: Delhi Metro
- Operator: Delhi Metro Rail Corporation (DMRC)
- Platforms: 2 (Side platforms)
- Tracks: 2

Construction
- Structure type: Elevated
- Platform levels: 2

History
- Opened: Expected 2025
- Electrified: through overhead catenary
Location

Sonia Vihar metro station on the Pink Line of the Delhi Metro, is located in Sonia Vihar, North East Delhi. It is being constructed as part of the Delhi Metro Phase IV expansion and will lie on the Majlis Park–Maujpur corridor. The station is expected to open in 2025.

=== Station layout ===
Level	Layout
Street level	Station entrance/exit
Concourse	Ticket counters, Customer care, Security
Platform	Side platforms for Pink Line trains

=== Station information ===
Pink Line
English	Hindi			
Sonia Vihar	सोनिया विहार			
Phase	Opening	Interchange	Structure	Platform
IV	2025 (expected)	None	Elevated	Side

Sonia Vihar Metro Station is an upcoming elevated station on Delhi Metro’s Pink Line, forming part of the 12.318 km Majlis Park–Maujpur corridor under Phase IV. The corridor adds eight new stations and will complete India’s first ring-shaped metro, doubling the system’s operational efficiency.

Corridor and Station List The extension includes eight elevated stations: Burari, Jharoda Majra, Jagatpur Village, Soorghat, Sonia Vihar, Khajuri Khas, Bhajanpura, and Yamuna Vihar.

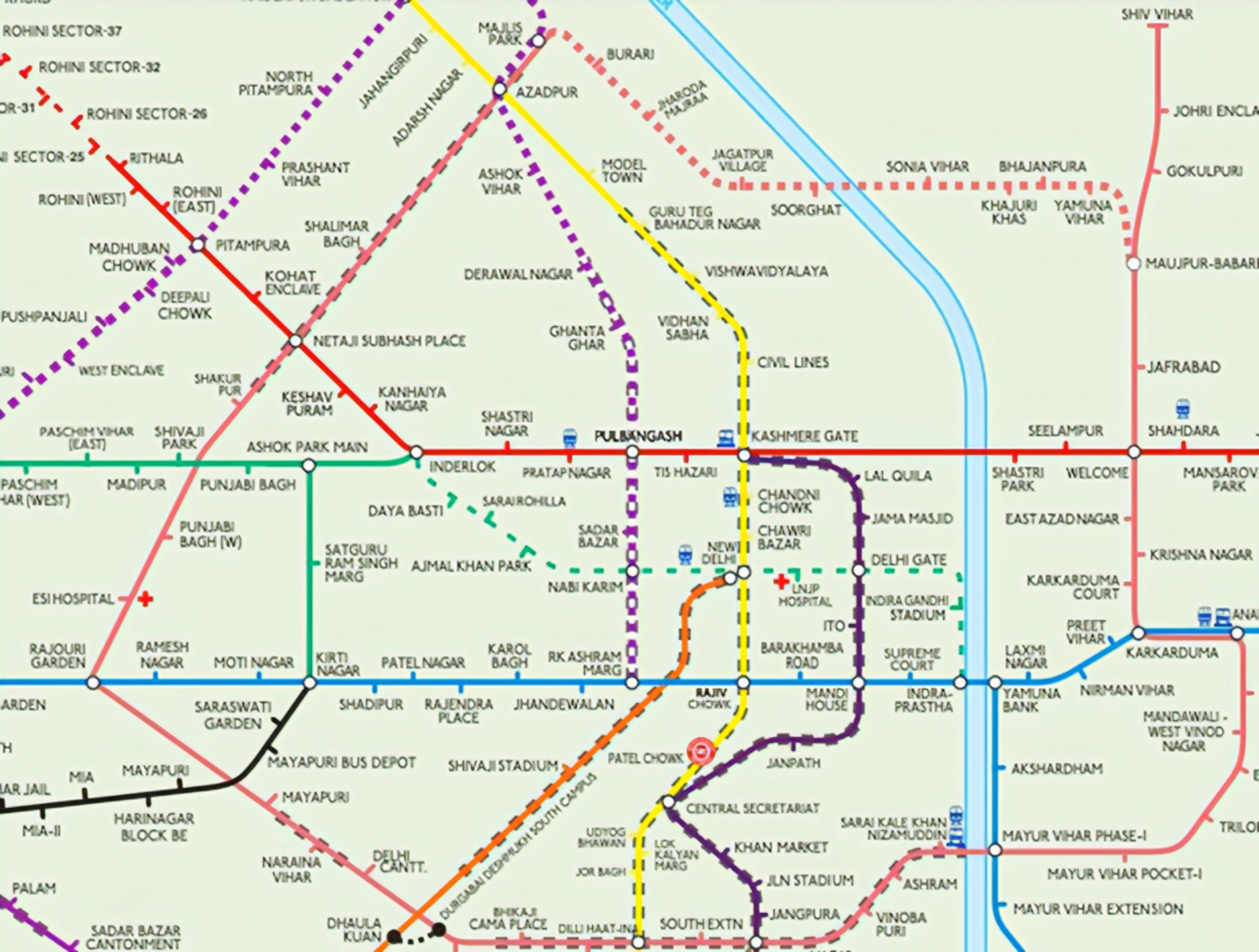
Delhi Metro Pink Line Route

Key Infrastructure

- A 560 m balanced-cantilever bridge across the Yamuna connects Soorghat and Sonia Vihar. It is the fifth Delhi Metro bridge over the river.
- A 1.4 km double-decker viaduct between Bhajanpura and Yamuna Vihar carries metro tracks on the upper deck and a road flyover on the lower deck.

Progress and Timeline

- As of mid-2025, the corridor is about 80–100% complete, with trial runs underway on the Majlis Park–Jagatpur Village stretch.
- The double-decker viaduct is structurally ready but awaits activation of its road-level ramp due to pending permissions.

Once operational, the Pink Line will be the first circular metro corridor in India, enabling uninterrupted travel across Delhi without interchanges.

=== Transport ===
Sonia Vihar is well-connected by road, and public transport services, including buses operated by the Delhi Transport Corporation (DTC), facilitate commuting to other parts of Delhi. A new Delhi Metro project is underway, with plans to connect Sonia Vihar to the broader metro network, enhancing accessibility and convenience for residents.

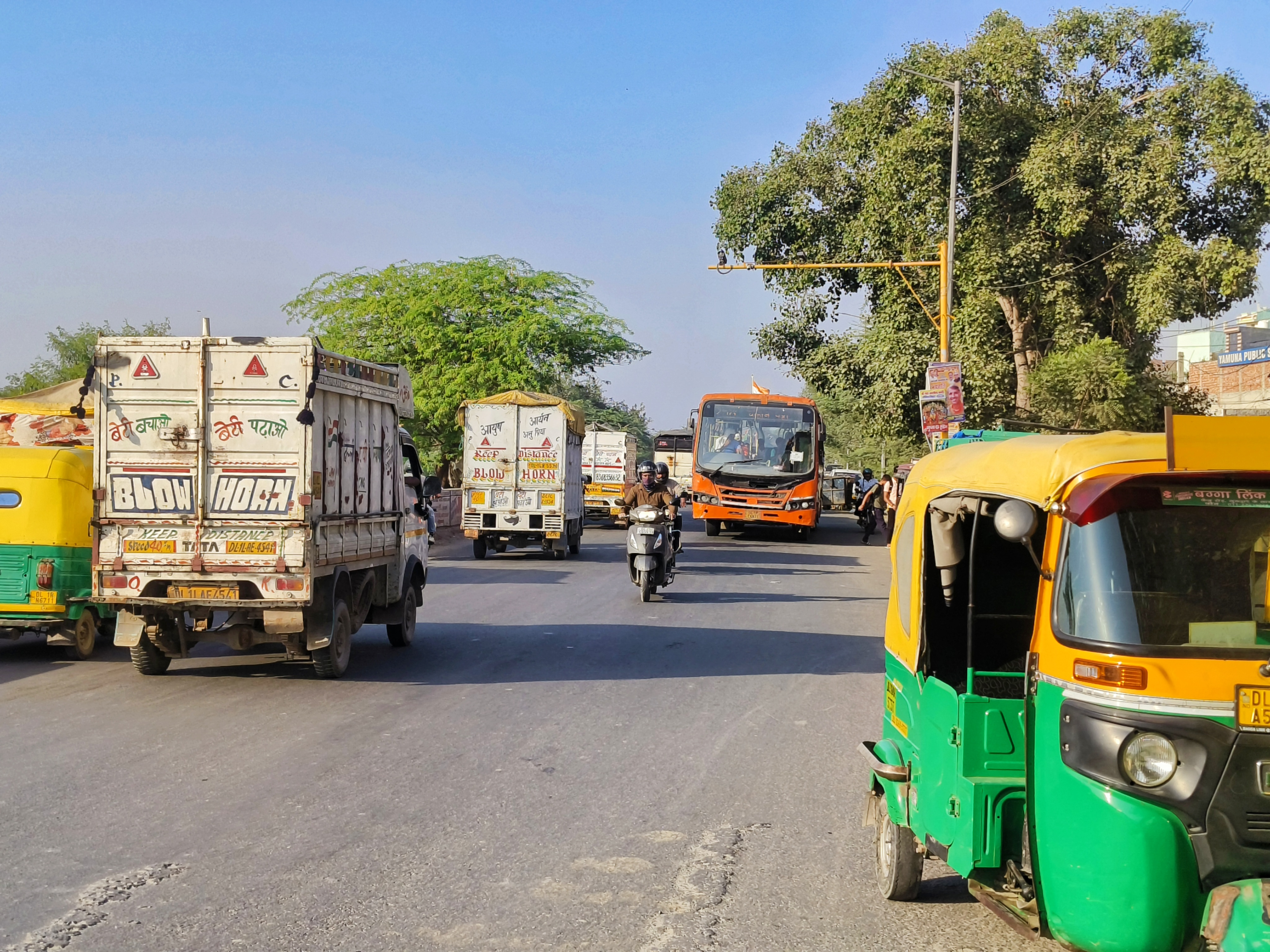
Sonia Vihar Main Road Connecting Ghaziabad

== Sonia Vihar Elevated Corridor ==
Sonia Vihar Elevated Corridor is a proposed elevated road infrastructure project located in the northeastern part of Delhi, India. The corridor is planned to decongest the heavily trafficked Pusta Road near Sonia Vihar and aims to improve connectivity between Delhi and the Uttar Pradesh border at Tronica City.

The project is being developed by the Public Works Department (PWD) of Delhi. It involves the construction of a 5.5 to 6 km long elevated road, starting from the Nanaksar Gurudwara T‑Point and terminating at the Delhi–UP border near Tronica City.

The corridor is estimated to cost approximately ₹500 crore (US$60 million), and it has received approval from the Delhi government as part of an urban decongestion and infrastructure improvement initiative.

Project Details

Feature	Specification
Project Name	Sonia Vihar Corridor
Location	Sonia Vihar, North East Delhi, India
Length	Approx. 5.5–6 km
Route	Nanaksar Gurudwara T‑Point to Delhi–UP Border (Tronica City)
Type	Elevated Road Corridor
Estimated Cost	₹500 crore (US$60 million)
Executing Agency	Public Works Department (PWD), Delhi
Status	Feasibility study initiated
Expected Benefits	Reduced traffic congestion, preservation of green cover, improved regional connectivity

Background

The existing Pusta Road in Sonia Vihar is a narrow and congested artery flanked by dense green cover and infrastructure such as pipelines operated by the Delhi Jal Board (DJB). Due to the limited availability of land and environmental sensitivities, traditional road widening has not been feasible. As a solution, the Delhi government proposed constructing an elevated corridor along the central verge of the existing road, supported by pillars to avoid land acquisition and ecological disruption.

Development Status

In 2025, the Delhi cabinet approved the project budget, and a feasibility study tender was floated to evaluate:

- Traffic patterns and congestion levels
- Environmental impact (especially related to green cover and underground utilities)
- Structural requirements and road design
- Right-of-way constraints

PWD engineers are also evaluating the existing infrastructure at the project’s entry point, where six feeder roads converge with the Pusta Road. This includes proximity to critical facilities such as the Delhi Jal Board water treatment plant.

Political and Administrative Support

The Sonia Vihar Corridor project has received backing from local residents and political representatives, including MLA Kapil Mishra. It was formally announced by PWD Minister Parvesh Verma during a site visit in April 2025. The initiative is supported under the administration of Delhi Chief Minister Rekha Gupta.

Environmental and Technical Considerations

The design of the corridor is tailored to minimize ecological and infrastructural disruptions. By constructing the corridor along the central verge of the existing road and raising it on pillars, the project will preserve surrounding tree cover and avoid interference with DJB pipelines.

Delhi PWD initiated a ₹500 crore project in 2025 for an elevated corridor (5.5–6 km) along Pusta Road, from Nanaksar Gurudwara to the Tronica City border. This aims to relieve traffic congestion across Sonia Vihar and adjoining areas.

== Sonia Vihar Circular Road ==
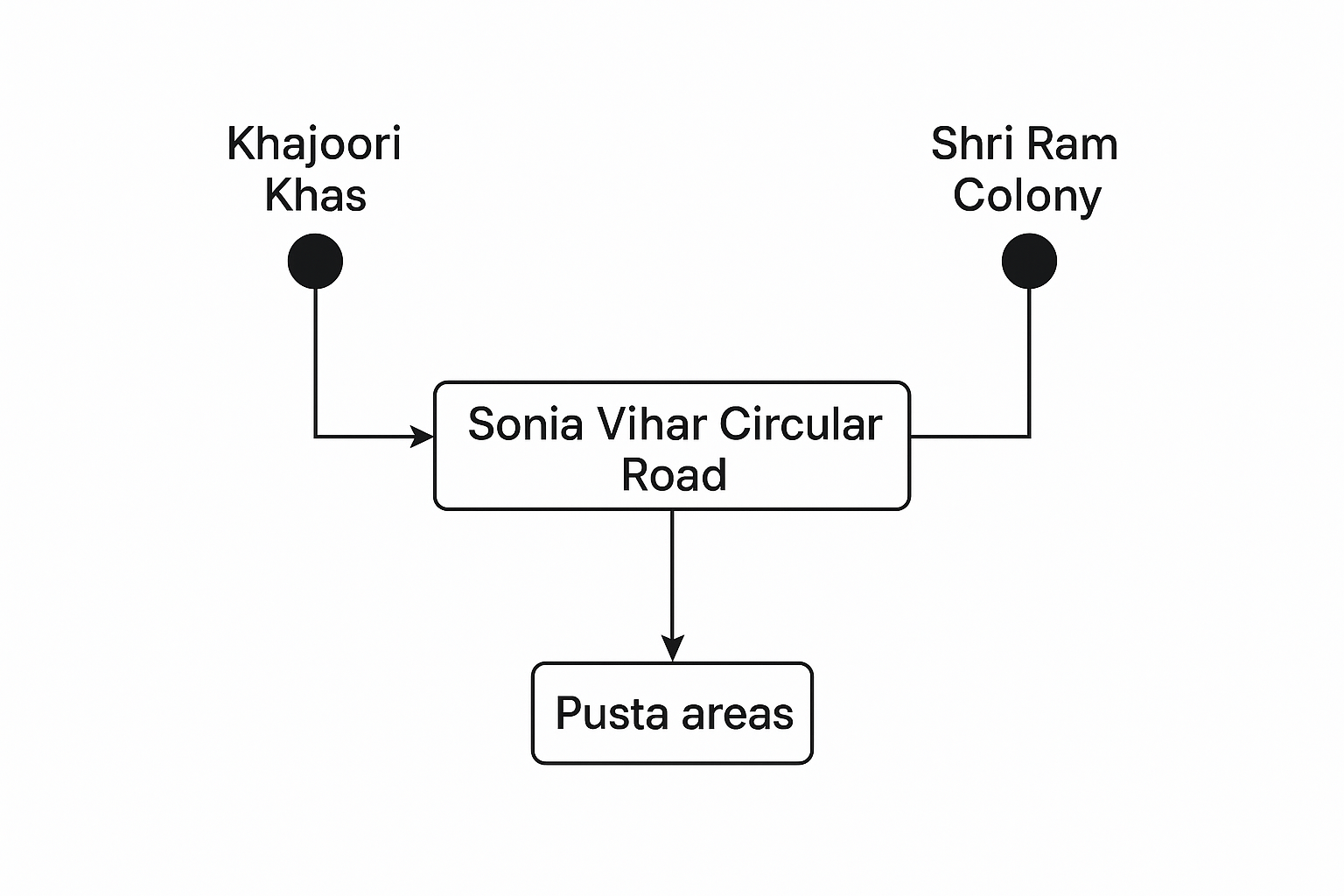
Sonia Vihar Circular Road Connectivity Diagram

Sonia Vihar Circular Road
- Circular Road, Sonia Vihar Ring Road

Route information
- Length: 2.5 km (1.6 mi)
- Status: Operational

Major junctions
- Khajoori Khas, Shri Ram Colony,Pusta No. 0,Pusta No. 1, Pusta No. 2, Pusta No. 3, Pusta No. 4

Location
- Country: India

Highway system
- Roads in India; Expressways; National; State; Asian

Sonia Vihar Circular Road is one of the major internal roads within the A-block of Sonia Vihar, a densely populated area in North East Delhi. It forms a curved or loop-shaped route that connects several key lanes, residential plots, and local marketplaces, serving as a vital lifeline for daily movement within the colony. It also connects Khajoori Khas and Shri Ram Colony to all Pusta areas of Sonia Vihar in a single stretch, enhancing interlocal access and traffic movement.

=== Geography and Layout ===
The road encircles much of the A-block region and intersects with several inner gali networks. It links important segments like:

- Pusta Road (including Pusta No. 2, 3, and 4)
- Sonia Vihar Main Market
- Service lanes and narrow bylanes leading to schools and temples

It connects Khajoori Khas and Shri Ram Colony to all Pusta areas of Sonia Vihar in one continuous stretch, acting as a vital link for residents commuting between eastern and western parts of the locality.

The Khajoori Khas Police Station is situated nearby, providing law enforcement services to both Khajoori and Sonia Vihar regions.

Despite its local character, the road plays a disproportionately large role in day-to-day transport for residents and businesses. It is especially active during morning and evening hours due to school and shop activities.

=== Landmarks and Institutions ===
Key institutions and landmarks along Sonia Vihar Circular Road include:

- The Child World Public School
- Sai International Public School
- SD Public School
- Sonia Vihar Shiv Mandir
- Ayush Clinic and various general medical stores
- Local grocery shops, stationery vendors, and mobile recharge kiosks

The area hosts small-scale commercial activity, with homes often having built-in ground-floor shops or rental spaces.

=== Traffic and Connectivity ===
Public transport options include:

- E-rickshaws and auto-rickshaws
- Nearby DTC bus stops on Pusta Road
- Proposed Sonia Vihar Metro Station under Delhi Metro Phase IV, expected to significantly improve connectivity once operational

The road is also used as a bypass route for local vehicles avoiding traffic on Pusta Road.

=== Infrastructure Projects ===
The Delhi Public Works Department (PWD) has issued tenders for a 6-km long elevated corridor from Nanaksar Gurudwara to the UP border, intended to relieve congestion on Pusta Road. Though Circular Road is not directly part of the corridor, traffic decongestion will benefit nearby routes including Sonia Vihar Circular Road.

== Economy and Real Estate ==
Most properties consist of small builder floors and plots (30–100 gaz). Prices range from ₹20 lakh to ₹80 lakh, based on legal status and proximity to Pusta and Circular Road. The locality is expected to see price appreciation with new connectivity projects.

In addition, the expected extension of the Delhi Metro’s Pink Line to Sonia Vihar will bring added value to the surrounding areas and reduce travel times to the rest of Delhi.

== See also ==
- Transport in Delhi
- Delhi Jal Board
