= Delhi division =

Administrative division of Delhi, India

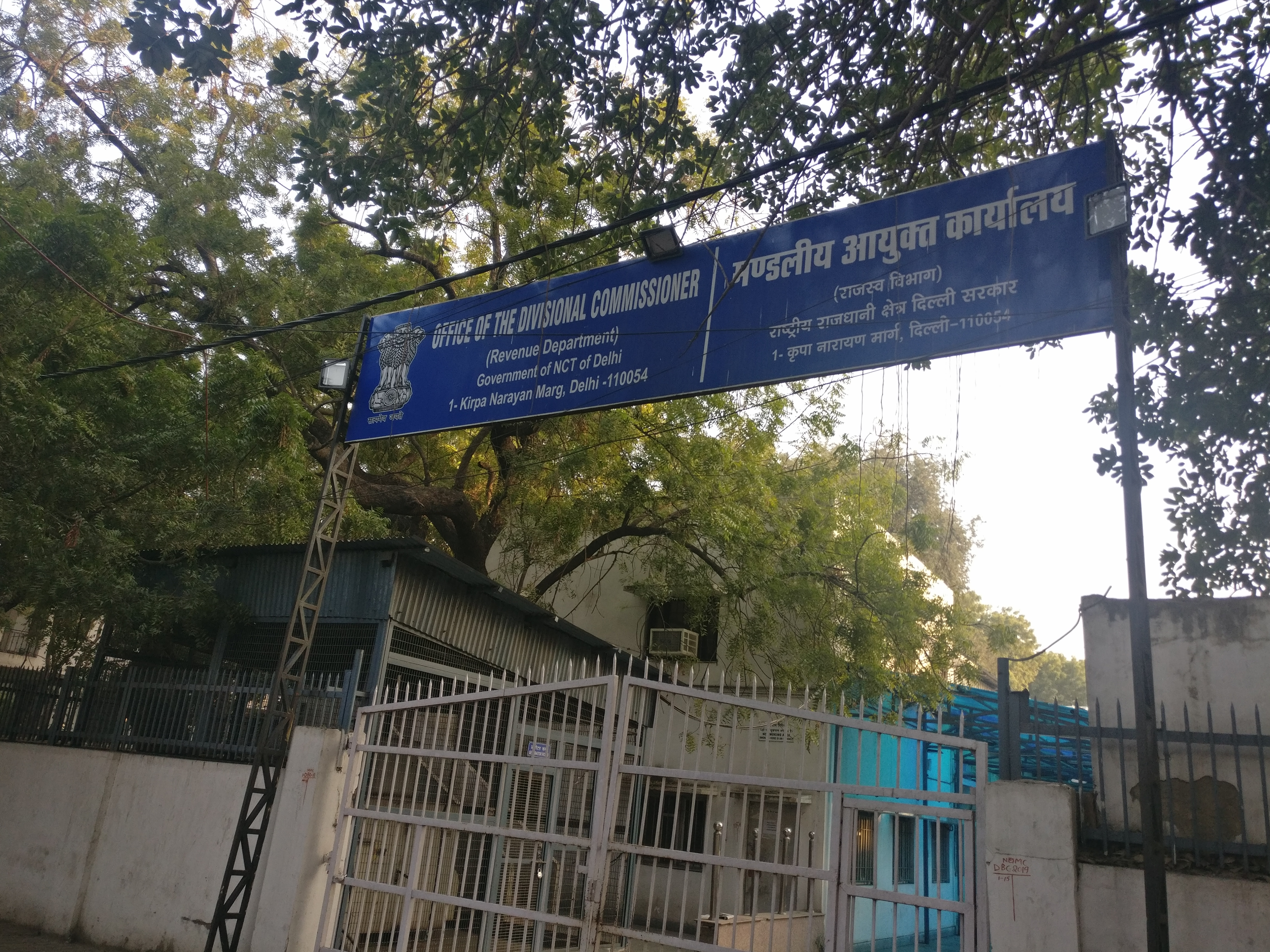
Office of the Divisional Commissioner, Government of Delhi situated at 5, Sham Nath Marg, Civil Lines, Central Delhi

Delhi Division is the only administrative and revenue division in Delhi, India which consists of 13 districts. Civil Lines in Central Delhi district is the headquarters of the Delhi division.

Delhi Division is headed by an IAS officer of the rank of Divisional Commissioner (Principal Secretary of Revenue). Each of these district is headed by a District Magistrate (DM), also called Deputy Commissioner (DC), who reports to the Divisional Commissioner of Delhi. The Divisional Commissioner reports to the Chief Secretary of Delhi.

Ashwani Kumar (IAS) is the current Divisional Commissioner of Delhi. Naresh Kumar (IAS) is the Chief Secretary of Delhi.

== List of districts and Sub-divisions ==
In December 2025, the Delhi government cabinet approved a major administrative reorganization of the National Capital Territory, expanding the number of revenue districts from 11 to 13. This restructuring was undertaken to align revenue district boundaries with the 12 administrative zones of the Municipal Corporation of Delhi (MCD), the New Delhi Municipal Council (NDMC), and the Delhi Cantonment.

The reorganization, which officially took effect on 1 January 2026, dissolved the former Shahdara district and carved out three new districts: Old Delhi, Central North Delhi, and Outer North Delhi. Concurrently, the total number of sub-divisions (tehsils) was increased from 33 to 39. All 13 districts fall under the single Delhi division, and currently function as the primary sub-agencies for administrative implementations such as the city's economic census operations.

Note: Population and area figures below reflect data prior to the 2026 administrative reorganization.

List of Districts and Sub-divisions in Delhi
| No. | District | Population | Area (km²) | Sub-divisions (Tehsils) |
|---|---|---|---|---|
| 1 | Central Delhi | 578,671 | 23 | Patel Nagar, Karol Bagh |
| 2 | Central North Delhi | – | – | Shakur Basti, Shalimar Bagh, Model Town |
| 3 | East Delhi | 1,707,725 | 49 | Gandhi Nagar, Vishwas Nagar, Patparganj |
| 4 | New Delhi | 133,713 | 35 | New Delhi, Delhi Cantonment |
| 5 | North Delhi | 883,418 | 59 | Burari, Adarsh Nagar, Badli |
| 6 | North East Delhi | 2,240,749 | 56 | Karawal Nagar, Gokal Puri, Yamuna Vihar, Shahdara |
| 7 | North West Delhi | 3,651,261 | 234.4 | Kirari, Nangloi Jat, Rohini |
| 8 | Old Delhi | – | – | Sadar Bazar, Chandni Chowk |
| 9 | Outer North Delhi | – | – | Mundka, Narela, Bawana |
| 10 | South Delhi | 2,733,752 | 249 | Chhatarpur, Malviya Nagar, Deoli, Mehrauli |
| 11 | South East Delhi | 637,775 | 102 | Jangpura, Kalkaji, Badarpur |
| 12 | South West Delhi | 2,292,363 | 421 | Najafgarh, Matiala, Dwarka, Bijwasan |
| 13 | West Delhi | 2,531,583 | 131 | Vikaspuri, Janakpuri, Rajouri Garden |
