= Annapurna Mishra =

Indian politician

Mayor, East Delhi Municipal Corporation
- In office 2012–2019
- Preceded by: office established
- Succeeded by: Anju Kamalkant
- Constituency: Sonia Vihar

Personal details
- Relations: Kapil Mishra (Son)

Annapurna Mishra was the first Mayor of the East Delhi Municipal Corporation. She was the first to occupy the office of mayor after the creation of three new local bodies in New Delhi after the municipal elections in 2012. She represents the Sonia Vihar neighborhood in East Delhi as a member of the Bhartiya Janata Party.

== Career ==
She launched a ‘tree plantation drive’ and plans to plant one lakh saplings. She has instructed officials to come up with a list of chargesheeted employees so that they are not posted on sensitive posts. In June, she organised a ‘Dengue, Malaria Prevention Month’ EDMC was the first corporation to organise camps for the recovery of property tax. Her son Activist Kapil Mishra was a prominent member of Aam Aadmi Party and MLA from Karawal Nagar who has joined the Bharatiya Janata Party on 17 Aug 2019. She has three daughters, her younger daughter Devsena Mishra is a proponent of advanced technologies and the startup ecosystem, is actively involved in the Indian government’s business and technology-related initiatives. Her work encompasses key programs such as Digital India, Make in India, Smart Cities, and Startup India.
