= Shiv Vihar =

Area of Karawal Nagar in Delhi, India

- Residential locality
- Shiv Vihar
- Location in Delhi, India
- Coordinates: 28.7217°N 77.2894°E
- Country: India
- State: Delhi
- District: North East Delhi
- Named for: Lord Shiva

Population
  - Total: 76,661

Languages
  - Official: Hindi
- Time zone: UTC+5:30 (IST)
- PIN: 110094

Shiv Vihar is an area of Karawal Nagar in North–East district of Delhi, India. It is a part of Mustafabad assembely constituency.

== Demographics ==
According to government censuses, Shiv Vihar is divided into a total of 138 wards and phases, including: Shanti Nagar, Panchal Vihar, Ambika Vihar, Prem Vihar, Kamal Vihar and Gautam Vihar. Shiv Vihar has a total population of 76,661, including SC population of 16,523. Shiv Vihar was among the wrost-affected areas by the 2020 Delhi riots.

== Transportation ==
Shiv Vihar has a well-connected transportation network that provides convinent travel options for residents. This area is connected through various road transport facilities, including local auto-rickshaws, and app-based cab services. Also the presence of Shiv Vihar metro station further improves connectivity.

== See also ==
- Karawal Nagar
- Yamuna Vihar
- North-East Delhi district
