= Mohan Singh Bisht =

Indian politician (born 1957)

Deputy Speaker of the Delhi Legislative Assembly
- Incumbent
- Assumed office 20 February 2025
- Speaker: Vijendra Gupta
- Preceded by: Rakhi Birla

Member of Delhi Legislative Assembly
- Incumbent
- Assumed office 8 February 2025
- Preceded by: Haji Yunus
- Constituency: Mustafabad
- In office 12 February 2020 – 8 February 2025
- Preceded by: Kapil Mishra
- Succeeded by: Kapil Mishra
- Constituency: Karawal Nagar
- In office 1998–2015
- Preceded by: Ram Pal
- Succeeded by: Kapil Mishra
- Constituency: Karawal Nagar

Personal details
- Born: 2 June 1957 (age 69) Ajoli Malli, Uttarakhand, India
- Party: Bharatiya Janata Party
- Spouse: Lakshmi Bisht
- Children: 2 (1 daughter and 1 son)
- Occupation: Politician

Mohan Singh Bisht ( /mɒhən ˈsɪŋ bɪʃt/; born 2 June 1957) is an Indian politician from Delhi, belonging to Bharatiya Janata Party (BJP). He is the current Deputy Speaker of Delhi Legislative Assembly. He is a Member of the Delhi Legislative Assembly from Mustafabad Vidhan Sabha constituency. He was elected successively in 1998, 2003, 2008, 2013, 2020, and 2025.

== Early life ==
Bisht was born on 2 June 1957 to Khushal Singh Bisht and Hira Devi at Ajoli Malli village, Almora district, Uttarakhand. He was attracted to politics at a young age, as he enjoyed seeing politicians visit his village in an effort to garner votes.

== Political career ==
=== Affiliations ===
In 1976 he moved to Delhi and joined Bharatiya Jana Sangh, predecessor of the Bharatiya Janata Party. He joined the Hindu nationalist organisation Rashtriya Swayamsevak Sangh (English: National Volunteer Organisation) in 1992, becoming a swayamsevak. He is an active member of the Delhi unit of another Sangh Parivar constituent Vishwa Hindu Parishad (English: World Hindu Council).

=== Vidhan Sabha elections ===
He is a member of the Bharatiya Janata Party. He has repeatedly contested the Karawal Nagar Vidhan Sabha Constituency since 1998 and has lost the election just once in 2015 to Kapil Mishra.

He was elected to the Second Legislative Assembly of Delhi in 1998, defeating runner-up Zile Singh (Indian National Congress) by 23,191 to 20,133 votes. In the 2003 state assembly election, he defeated the runner-up Hasan Ahmed (Indian National Congress) by 15,227 votes. In the 2008 state assembly election, he further improved his margin of victory from the last election, winning against runner-up independent candidate Satan Pal Dayma by a margin of 21,128 votes. In 2013 state legislative assembly election, he received a tough fight from Kapil Mishra (Aam Aadmi Party), but finally won by a margin of 3083 votes.

==== 2013 assembly election ====
He was appointed vice-president of the BJP's Delhi unit by the president Vijay Goel in May 2013. A First Information Report was registered against Bisht in October 2013 for alleged violation of model code of conduct. On 7 November 2013, the Bharatiya Janata Party announced Bisht as the party's candidate from Karawal Nagar Constituency for the 2013 state legislative assembly election, held on 4 December. His main election issues included infrastructure development, inflation and corruption.

== Personal life ==
Bisht married Laxmi Bisht on 13 April 1980; they have a daughter and a son. His family owns Adharshila Convent Public School, a senior secondary school in Karawal Nagar. His interests include social service and sports like football and kabaddi. He "loves" watching religious soap operas. He resides with his family at Dayal Pur Extension, North East Delhi. In 2006, his house at the time was demolished by the Municipal Corporation of Delhi as a part of sealing drive because it was "illegally" constructed.
