= Dayal Pur =

- Neighborhood of Delhi
- Location in Delhi, India
- Country: India
- State: Delhi
- District: North East Delhi
- Lok Sabha Constituency: North East Delhi
- Vidhan Sabha Constituency: Mustafabad

Government
  - MP: Manoj Tiwari
  - MLA: MOHAN SINGH BISHT

Population (2011)
  - Total: 20,589

Languages
  - Official: Hindi, English
- Time zone: UTC+5:30 (IST)
- PIN: 110094

Dayal Pur is a census town & village in Mustafabad in North East Delhi in NCT of Delhi, India. It was named after a Gurjar zamindar Ch. Dayal Singh aka "Baba Dayala". Currently majority of native inhabitants range from 6th to 10th generation after Baba Dayala. It was an agricultural village until last three decades when there was an influx of people from Garhwal, Kumaon and 'Purab'.

== Demographics ==
As of 2011 India census, Dayal Pur had a population of 20,589, compared to the 2001 census, when it was 12,994 The 2011 population comprised 11,024 males and 9,565 females, a sex ratio of 860, which equals the state average. There were 2,684 children 0–6 (13.4%) and the average literacy rate was 89.48%, higher than the state average of 86.21%.

== Nearby places ==
Dayal Pur is near to:

- Delhi University = 7 km
- ISBT = 10 km
- Anand Vihar = 12.5 km
- Old Delhi Railway Station = 12 km
- New Delhi Railway Station = 15 km
- Rajiv Chowk (CP) = 22 km
- Gokalpuri Metro Station = 3.7 km

== Schools in the area ==
Dayal Pur has one Govt school for boys and another for girls and primary school also.
Few other private schools are also there.
Chickz Wee Play School & Daycare facility
