= Seelampur =

Neighborhood in Delhi, India

- Location within Delhi
- Coordinates: 28°39′57″N 77°16′16″E
- Country: India
- State: Delhi
- District: North East Delhi district
- PIN: 110031

Seelampur is a neighborhood in Shahdara, Delhi, India and one of the subdivisions of North East Delhi district.

The neighborhood is the largest processor of e-waste in India. As of 2025, approximately 30,000 tonnes of e-waste is processed in the neighborhood daily, employing nearly 50,000 workers to extract scrap.

== Transportation ==
- Delhi Metro: The area is located close to the Seelampur metro station of Red Line.
- Indian Railways: The area is served by the Vivek Vihar railway station, which is on the Sahibabad-Shahdara-Delhi Junction branch of the Delhi-Howrah line.
- Bus: DTC bus routes 205, 939, 218, 274, 374, and 213 serve the neighborhood.
