= Jiwan Pur =

Johripur
- city
- Location in India
- Coordinates: 28.72132°N 77.27458°E
- Country: India
- State: Delhi
- District: North East

Population (2001)
  - Total: 20,765

Languages
  - Official: Hindi, English
- Time zone: UTC+5:30 (IST)

Johripur is a village in North East district in the Indian territory of Delhi.

== Demographics ==
As of 2001 India census, Jiwan Pur had a population of 20,765. Males constitute 54% of the population and females 46%. Jiwan Pur has an average literacy rate of 67%, higher than the national average of 59.5%: male literacy is 75%, and female literacy is 57%. In Jiwan Pur, 18% of the population is under 6 years of age.
