= Baqiabad, Delhi =

Coordinates: 25°06′N 82°54′E

Baqiabad
- census town
- Location in India
- Country: India
- Union Territory: Delhi
- District: North East

Population (2011)
  - Total: 14,429

Languages
  - Official: Hindi
- Time zone: UTC+5:30 (IST)

Baqiabad is a census town in North East district in the Indian territory of Delhi.
