= North East Delhi Lok Sabha constituency =

Lok Sabha Constituency in Delhi

Coordinates: 28.7090°N 77.2750°E

North East Delhi DL-2
- Lok Sabha constituency
- Interactive Map Outlining North East Delhi Lok Sabha constituency

Constituency details
- Country: India
- Region: North India
- Union Territory: Delhi
- Assembly constituencies: Burari; Timarpur; Seemapuri; Rohtas Nagar; Seelampur; Ghonda; Babarpur; Gokalpur; Mustafabad; Karawal Nagar
- Established: 2008
- Reservation: None

Member of Parliament
- 18th Lok Sabha
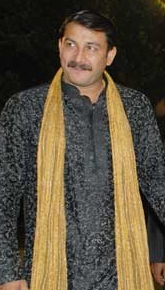
- Incumbent Manoj Tiwari
- Party: BJP
- Alliance: NDA
- Elected year: 2024

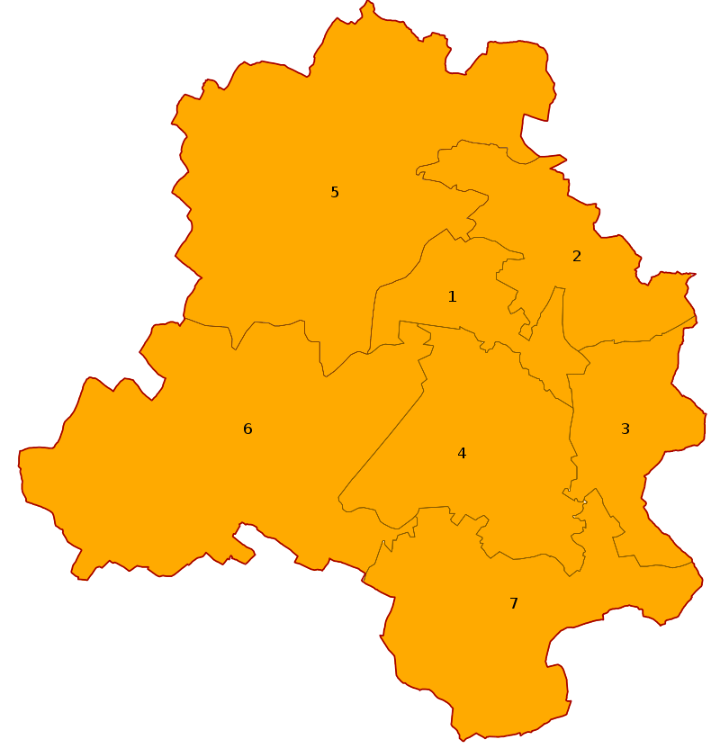
Political Map of Delhi (National Capital Territory of Delhi) showing Parliamentary constituencies as of 2024 elections.

North East Delhi Lok Sabha constituency is one of the 7 Lok Sabha (parliamentary) constituencies in National Capital Territory of Delhi. This constituency came into existence in 2008 as a part of the implementation of the recommendations of the Delimitation Commission of India constituted in 2002. This LS constituency is dominated by migrants from UP and Bihar.

== Assembly segments ==
At present, North East Delhi Lok Sabha constituency comprises the following 10 Vidhan Sabha (legislative assembly) segments:

#	Name	District	Member	Party	Leading (in 2024)
2	Burari	Central Delhi	Sanjeev Jha	AAP	BJP
3	Timarpur	Central Delhi	Surya Khatri	BJP	BJP
63	Seemapuri (SC)	Shahdara	Veer Singh Dhingan	AAP	INC
64	Rohtas Nagar	Shahdara	Jitender Mahajan	BJP	BJP
65	Seelampur	North East Delhi	Abdul Rehman	AAP	INC
66	Ghonda	North East Delhi	Ajay Mahawar	BJP	BJP
67	Babarpur	Shahdara	Gopal Rai	AAP	INC
68	Gokalpur (SC)	North East Delhi	Surendra Kumar	AAP	BJP
69	Mustafabad	North East Delhi	Mohan Singh Bisht	BJP	INC
70	Karawal Nagar	North East Delhi	Kapil Mishra	BJP	BJP

== Members of Parliament ==
The North-East Delhi Lok Sabha constituency was created in 2009. The list of Member of Parliament (MP) is as follows:

Year	Member	Party
Till 2009 : Constituency did not exist
2009	Jai Prakash Agarwal	Indian National Congress
2014	Manoj Tiwari	Bharatiya Janata Party
2019	Manoj Tiwari	Bharatiya Janata Party
2024	Manoj Tiwari	Bharatiya Janata Party

== Election results ==
=== 2024 ===
2024 Indian general election: North East Delhi
Party	Candidate	Votes	%	±%
BJP	Manoj Tiwari	824,451	53.10	▼0.80
INC	Kanhaiya Kumar	685,673	44.16	▲15.31
NOTA	None of the above	5,873	0.38	
Majority		1,38,778	8.94	
Turnout		15,53,679	63.04	▼0.82
BJP hold		Swing		

=== 17th Lok Sabha ===
2019 Indian general elections: North East Delhi
Party	Candidate	Votes	%	±%
BJP	Manoj Tiwari	787,799	53.90	▲10.67
INC	Sheila Dikshit	421,697	28.85	▲12.55
AAP	Dilip Pandey	1,90,856	13.06	▼21.24
BSP	Rajveer Singh	37,831	2.59	▼0.02
NOTA	None of the Above	4,589	0.31	+0.02
Majority		3,66,102	25.05	14.12
Turnout		14,62,767	63.86	−3.43
BJP hold		Swing		

=== 16th Lok Sabha: 2014 General Elections ===
2014 Indian general elections: North East Delhi
Party	Candidate	Votes	%	±%
BJP	Manoj Tiwari	596,125	45.23	+11.52
AAP	Prof. Anand Kumar	452,041	34.30	N/A
INC	Jai Prakash Agarwal	2,14,792	16.30	−42.73
BSP	Abdul Sami Salmani	28,135	2.13	−2.89
NOTA	None of the Above	3,824	0.29	N/A
Majority		1,44,084	10.93	−14.39
Turnout		13,17,338	67.29	+14.94
BJP gain from INC		Swing	+11.54	

=== 15th Lok Sabha: 2009 General Elections ===
2009 Indian general elections: North East Delhi
Party	Candidate	Votes	%	±%
INC	Jai Prakash Agarwal	518,191	59.03	
BJP	B. L. Sharma (Prem)	295,948	33.71	
BSP	Haji Dilshad Ali	44,111	5.02	
Majority		2,22,243	25.32	
Turnout		8,77,904	52.35	
INC win (new seat)				

== See also ==
- Delhi Sadar (Lok Sabha constituency)
- List of former constituencies of the Lok Sabha
