= Seemapuri =

Seemapuri is a neighborhood in Delhi, India and one of the subdivisions of Shahdara District.
