= Central Delhi district =

- District of Delhi
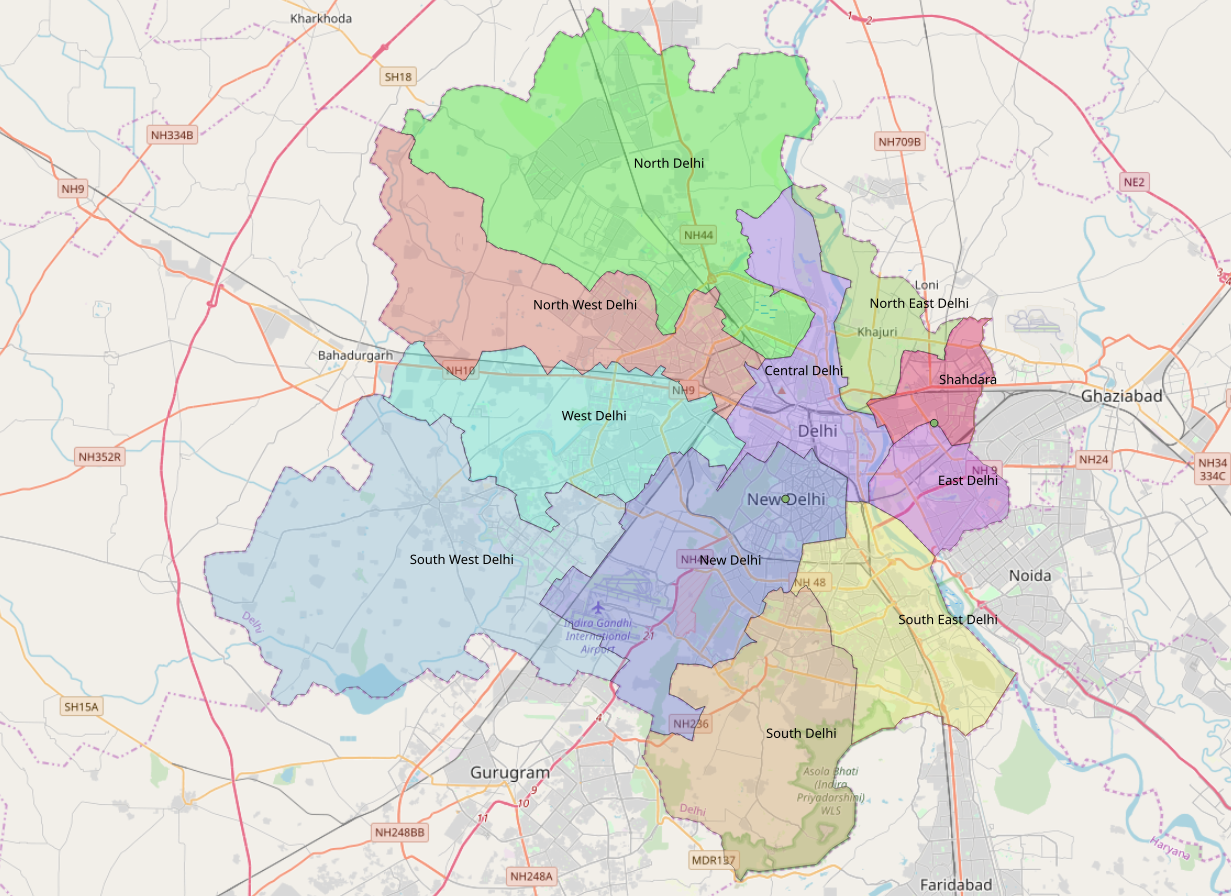
- Location in Delhi, India
- Coordinates: 28°38′42″N 77°14′42″E
- Country: India
- Union territory: Delhi
- Division: Delhi division
- Headquarters: Daryaganj

Government
  - District Magistrate: G Sudhakar, IAS

Population (2011)
  - Total: 582,320

Languages
  - Official: Hindi, English, Punjabi, Urdu
- Time zone: UTC+5:30 (IST)
- PIN: 1100xx
- Lok Sabha MP: Praveen Khandelwal
- Deputy Commissioner: Arun Kumar Mishra
- Website: dccentral.delhi.gov.in

Central Delhi district is an administrative district of the National Capital Territory of Delhi in India. It is bounded by the Yamuna River on the east and by the districts of North Delhi to the north, West Delhi and North West Delhi to the west, New Delhi and South East Delhi to the south, and East Delhi, Shahdara, and North East Delhi to the east across the Yamuna.

Central Delhi has a population of 582,320 (2011 census), and an area of 25 square kilometres (9.7 sq mi), with a population density of 25,759/km^{2} (66,720/sq mi), making it the most densely populated district of India. Central Delhi business district and high rises. It includes Old Delhi.

== Administrative Setup ==
The Central District is headed by a District Magistrate under whom there is an Additional District Magistrate, three Sub-Divisional Magistrates, three Tehsildars and two Sub-Registrar Officers. The District Magistrate reports to Divisional Commissioner. DM is the monitoring/control officer who supervises and directs the work.

The district is divided into three subdivisions, Civil Lines, Karol Bagh, and Kotwali, Delhi. Each Subdivision is headed by a SDM and has police stations under it.

SDM Kotwali 1) Darya Ganj 2) Jama Masjid 3) Chandni Mahal 4) I P Estate 5) Sarai Rohilla 6) Gulabi Bagh 7) Sadar Bazar 8) Bada Hindu Rao 9) Sabzi Mandi 10) Kotwali 11) Lahori Gate 12) Kashmiri Gate 13) Old Delhi Railway Station 14) Kashmiri Gate Metro Station 15) Sarai Rohilla Railway Station

SDM Karol Bagh 1) Karol Bagh 2) Rajinder Nagar 3) Prasad Nagar 4) Deshbandhu Gupta Road 5) Pahar Ganj 6) Nabi Karim 7) Kamla Market 8) Hauz Qazi

SDM Civil Lines 1) Civil Lines 2) Roop Nagar 3) Burari 4) Timar Pur 5) Maurice Nagar

== Demographics ==
Historical population
Year	Pop.	±% p.a.
1961	672,063	—
1971	691,738	+0.29%
1981	691,223	−0.01%
1991	656,533	−0.51%
2001	646,385	−0.16%
2011	582,320	−1.04%

According to the 2011 census Central Delhi has a population of 582,320, roughly equal to the nation of Solomon Islands or the US state of Wyoming. This gives it a ranking of 531st in India (out of a total of 640). The district has a population density of 23,149 inhabitants per square kilometre (59,960/sq mi). Its population growth rate over the decade 2001–2011 was −10.48%. Central Delhi has a sex ratio of 892 females for every 1000 males, and a literacy rate of 85.25%.

Religions in Central Delhi district (2011)
Religion	Percent
Hinduism	62.53%
Islam	33.36%
Sikhism	2.24%
Jainism	1.01%
Christianity	0.61%
Other or not stated	0.25%
Distribution of religions

Block	Hindu	Muslim	Other
Pahar Ganj	150,454	15,534	8,625
Darya Ganj	89,320	175,501	6,287
Karol Bagh	124,374	3,243	8,982

The readjusted Central Delhi district has a population of 894,389, of which 876,643 (98.02%) live in urban areas. The readjusted district has a sex ratio of 876 females per 1000 males. Scheduled Castes make up 197,123 (22.04%) of the population.

Languages of Central Delhi district (2011)
1. Hindi (85.0%)
2. Punjabi (4.27%)
3. Urdu (3.59%)
4. Bhojpuri (1.16%)
5. Bengali (1.05%)
6. Others (4.88%)

At the time of the 2011 census, 85.05% of the population spoke Hindi, 4.27% Punjabi, 3.59% Urdu, 1.16% Bhojpuri and 1.05% Bengali as their first language.

== See also ==
- Districts of Delhi
