= Tukhmir Pur =

- census town
- Location in India
- Country: India
- Union Territory: Delhi
- District: North East

Population (2011)
  - Total: 5,658

Languages
  - Official: Hindi
- Time zone: UTC+5:30 (IST)

Tukhmir Pur is a census town in North East district in the Indian territory of Delhi.

== Demographics ==
According to the 2011 census, the population of Tukhmir Pur was 5,658, of which 3,029 were male and 2,629 were female.[1] Tukhmir Pur has an average literacy rate of 83%, lower than the state average of 86.21%: male literacy is 89.67%, and female literacy is 75.37%.
