= Bhajanpura =

- Neighborhood of Delhi
- Location of Bhajanpura Bhajanpura (India)
- Coordinates: 28°42′N 77°15′E
- Country: India
- State: Delhi
- District: North East Delhi

Government
  - Type: East Delhi Municipal Corporation

Languages
  - Official: Hindi
- Time zone: UTC+5:30 (IST)
- PIN: 110053

Bhajanpura Police Station

Bhajanpura is a residential area in the North East District of Delhi, India, 4 kilometres (2.5 mi) from Shahdara and 10 kilometres (6.2 mi) from old Delhi railway station. It is a highly populated portion of the Trans Yamuna area. Bhajanpura is around 5 kilometres (3.1 mi) from North campus and 8 kilometres (5.0 mi) from ISBT Kashmiri Gate, Shastri Park Metro Station (The First Depot of Delhi Metro). The area is currently used for commercial activities and is very well suited for residential purposes.

== Features ==
There are few major attractions in Bhajanpura. Transportation hubs include the nearby interstate bus terminal, railway station (Anand Vihar). The areas proximity to New Delhi and Old Delhi means there is an abundance of educational institutions like Lal Bahadur Shastri college which affiliated with Delhi University. Located nearby is the Northern India Engineering college affiliated with I.P. University which also 2 kilometres (1.2 mi) from Bhajanpura. Additional facilities are being built in the area such as the Sonia Vihar power plant.

The main landmark of Bhajanpura is Bhajanpura Chowk. There are various blocks in Bhajanpura such as A, B, C, D etc. and every street is given a number.

Unlike its neighborhood Yamuna Vihar, Bhajanpura is not well planned with no parks at all making it a congested place.

Interesting fact is that C block of Bhajanpura is actually Block A of Yamuna Vihar (as per the locals).

== Safety ==
Around 2012, gates were installed in the busier streets to prevent unwanted traffic from the Pusta side. Security guards were also appointed. This not only led to an increase in traffic but also an increased crime rate involving crimes such as snatching of chains. On 10 December 2014 two men/boys snatched a gold chain from a girl by showing her a gun.

== Signature Bridge ==
The Signature Bridge over the Yamuna River was proposed in 2002, and work started in 2007. Intended to greatly alleviate traffic problems in North Delhi, it was the first asymmetrical cable bridge in India, completed by late 2018.
