= Dr. Bhim Rao Ambedkar College =

College in Delhi, India

Dr. Bhim Rao Ambedkar College University of Delhi
- Motto: Atto Deepo Bhava
- Motto in English: Shine in your own Glory
- Type: Public
- Established: 1991; 32 years ago
- Parent institution: University of Delhi
- Chairman: Deepanshu Shrivastava
- Principal: Sadanand Prasad
- Faculty: 88
- Undergraduates: 1650
- Postgraduates: None
- Location: Wazirabad Road, Delhi; 28°42′02″N 77°17′11″E
- Campus: North Campus, 9 acres (36,000 m^{2}) green area, Northeast District
- Named After: B. R. Ambedkar
- Website: drbrambedkarcollege.ac.in

Dr. Bhim Rao Ambedkar College is a constituent college of the University of Delhi. It was established on 8 February 1991 during the birth centenary year of B. R. Ambedkar. It is funded by the Delhi Government to cater to the needs of higher education in Delhi. The college offers several academic and professional undergraduate courses and is the only college in Delhi that has Social Work programme for boys. Other courses like B.A. (Hons.) Applied Psychology, B.A. (Hons.) Business Economics, B.A. (Hons.) Geography, B.A. (Hons.) Hindi Journalism and Mass Communication, B.A. (Hons.) History, B.Com. (Hons.), B. Com and B.A. Programme are also offered here.

== Campus ==
The college is located in North East District of Delhi(off campus). It is spread over 9 acres (36,000 m^{2}). The nearest metro station is Gokulpuri Metro Station and nearest bus stop is Shyam Giri Mandir.

=== Computer lab ===
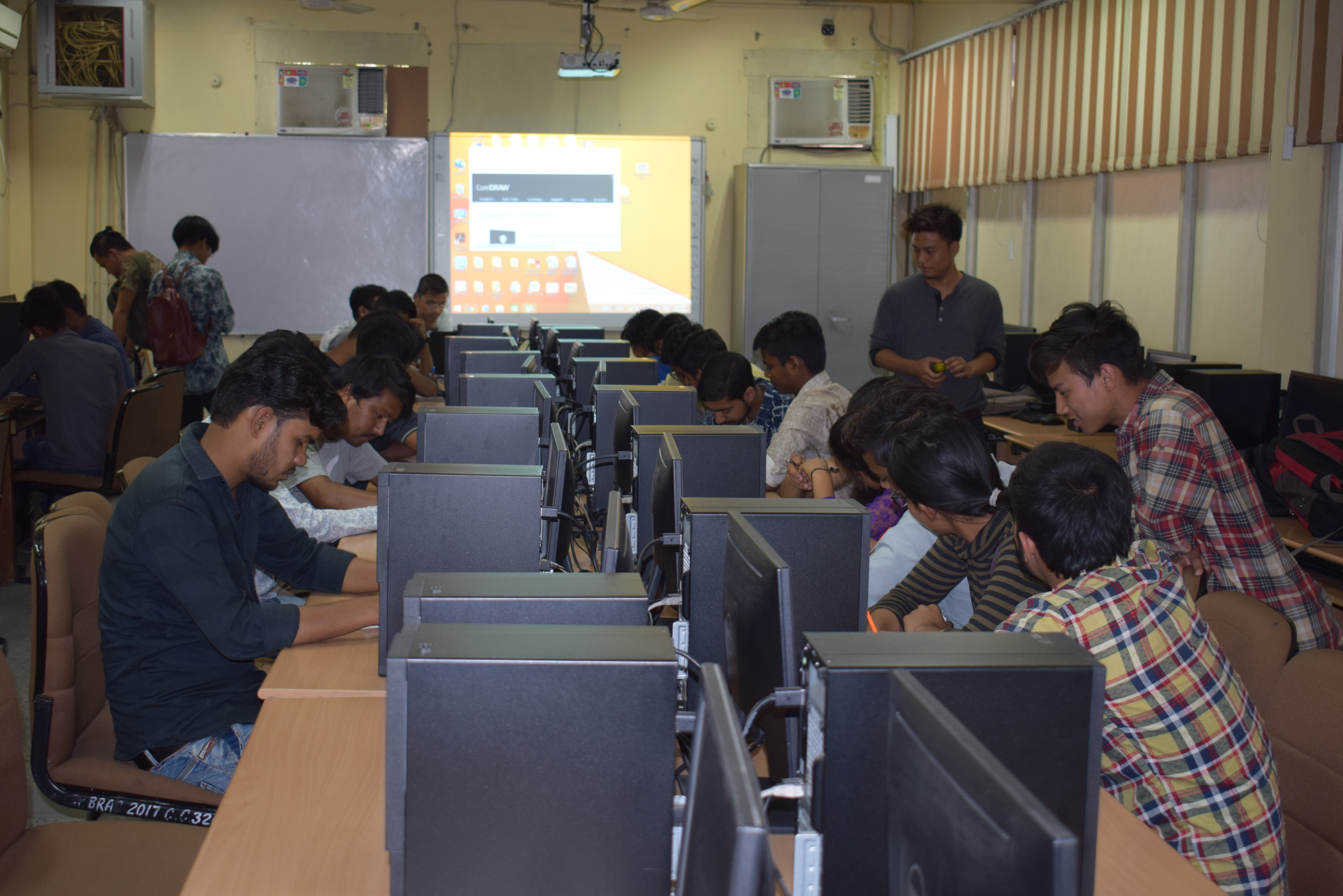
Computer Lab

The Computer Lab in college is essential for students who are studying technical or professional courses. Laptops are issued to both faculty and students. Special preference is given to PwD students of the college.

=== Library ===
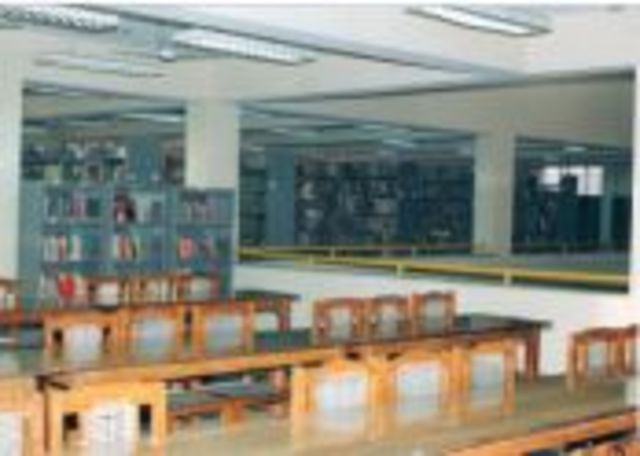
Library

The library has reading areas and houses more than 35,000 books. Each year new books are added as needed. The library subscribes to relevant national and internationally published journals and magazines like Business India, Computers Today's, Economic and Political Weekly, India Today, National Geographic, Outlook, Frontier, Frontline, Reader's Digest, Taipei to name a few. Each student can borrow up to 3 books through his College ID. The library also has mechanism to provide books to the deserving students coming from economically weaker sections of the society. The library is fully computerized with online facilities available to students and faculty of the college.

=== Seminar hall ===
The college has a seminar hall with a capacity of 250. It frequently hosts seminars, workshops and lectures where prominent people from industry and commerce are invited to speak to undergraduate students. The college has recently developed a conference room to cater to the growing needs of students from professional courses for group discussions, seminars, presentations, panel discussions and so on, which form a vital part of their curriculum.

=== Banking ===
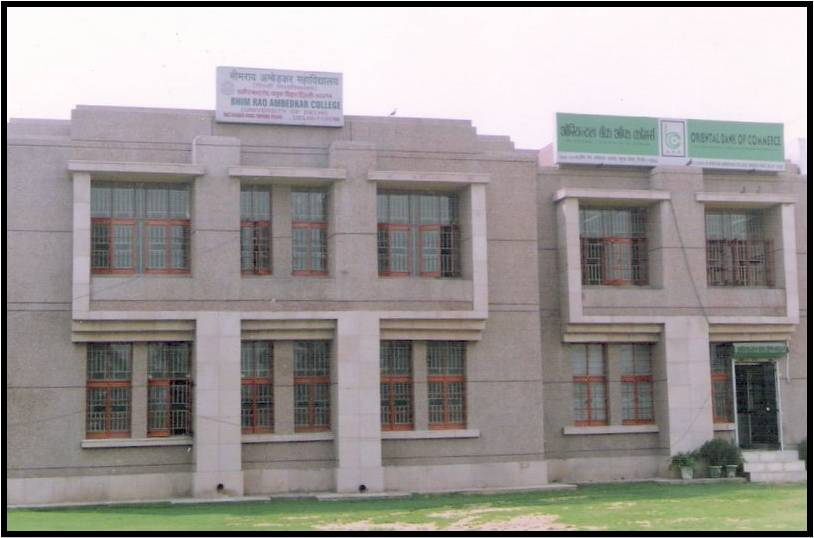
Punjab National Bankbranch at College Premises

The college has a fully computerised branch of Punjab National Bank which provides banking facilities to the teaching & non-teaching staff, students of the college and residents of the area. The college also has an ATM facility.

=== Medical centre ===
The facility of WUS Health Centre (East Campus) has been provided in the residential campus of the college. The college does not provide residential facilities to students at present. The centre caters to the needs of university employees residing in trans-Yamuna area. Aid facility is available free of cost to the college students.

The college maintains power back up, canteen, photostat and other necessities at the university subsidised rates. A 24-hour operational petrol pump is found exactly adjacent to the college premises providing convenience to students, faculty and residents of the area alike. The college is also taking initiatives on the recommendations given by the Delhi project report prepared by Samakhayam in Feb 2008.

Principal GK Arora, Ashwani Kumar Chand, IPS (Sikkim Cadre), N. Victoria Chanu (NE Cell Coordinator), staffs and students celebrating Sikkim Week

== Academics ==
As of May 2017, the college has 13 teaching departments.

=== Admissions ===
The college acts in accordance to the Delhi University Centralised Admission procedure. Admission to a course of study is based on the cut-off percentage announced through the University in June every year. Prospective students should have completed 12 years of study and must have scored the given cut-off percentage in previous qualifying examination. Foreign students are admitted as per the prescribed University guidelines. Apart from aforementioned criteria, for admission to few professional courses, students have to undergo an additional All India Written Entrance Test and/or interview conducted by their respective parent departments. At present four degree programs demand this requirement. The college also holds reservations for candidates belonging to non-general category. At present 22.5% seats are reserved for SC/ST category, 27% for OBCs as per the guidelines and modalities communicated by the University vide University Letter Aca I/OBC/2007/80, 3% for Physically Challenged candidates and 5% each for children/widow/wives of officers and men of Armed Forces killed or disabled in action, 5% for foreign students and 5% for admission on basis of sports and co-curricular distinctions, where eligible.

Each year the university also organises centralised open days across various colleges of the university with the aim of providing all information relating to admissions, colleges and courses of the university respectively. The academic sessions starts from 16 July each year.

=== Sports ===
Each year the college selects students with "potential for excellence" through sports quota tests under the guidance of Dr. K. K. Sharma. In a short span of time, the college has carved a niche on the map of University of Delhi through various achievements secured by students and the staff members at the University and National Level respectively. The college is well known for the sports such as cross country, netball, archery, pistol and rifle shooting, softball, athletics and relays where students have made records and secured accolades of great prestige.

At present the college has hockey, basketball, football, and badminton courts. The college also has facilities for cricket, ping pong, volleyball, handball, chess, and judo. The college has recently acquired (in 2007) its own shooting range and has thus become one of the five colleges of Delhi University having such a facility. The Annual Sports Day is celebrated in the month of February each year.

== Societies and Clubs ==
The College has several clubs and societies. It is also part of national programs like NSS and NCC.

== Student life ==
=== Awards, recognition and scholarships ===
To honour the ideology of Dr. B. R. Ambedkar, the college provides a number of scholarships and prizes to promote and honour talent among current students as well as welcome potential candidates from all walks of life irrespective of caste, colour, creed, gender, income and social status.

Apart from prizes, awards are given for academic distinction in the university examination, for distinguished performance in debates/discussions, cultural activities and sports. College colors are awarded to sportsmen/sportswomen winning distinction at inter-college events.

Prospective students can also apply for the following scholarships:

- National Scholarship awarded by Department oh Higher Education, Government of India
- Delhi University All India Competitive Scholarship.

=== North East Cell ===
The college has special cell which has been working for the welfare of North East students since 2012 under college authority. The cell has been helping many students who are coming from North East India and Foreign Students. There are approximately 200 students from North East India and foreign countries like Afghanistan, Tibet, Nepal, Kenya etc. The cell organises a lot of activities in the college level like seminars, workshops, awareness programs and competitions. Presently, Ningombam Victoria Chanu and Ningombam Sanjay Singh are working as the Convenors of the cell.

=== College Student's Council ===
The college's student council is elected by students through common franchise as per the guidelines provided by the Honourable Supreme Court of India regarding Model Code of Conduct for DUSU elections. The elections are usually held during August–September each year. The committees of Staff Council appoints the Cultural and Sports' secretaries respectively. One seat of four posts—President, Vice-President, Secretary and Joint Secretary—is reserved for a female student. All office members hold office until 30 April of the ongoing session in normal courses, barring disqualifications.

=== Student societies and activities ===
Each year the college organises an Annual Cultural festival Chetna. The college publishes it annual magazine of the same name by inviting articles on wide-ranging issues to help students to cultivate writing and literary tastes and also to encourage creative articulation. The cultural society has won accolades at BITS, Pilani and IIT, Kanpur festivals. Debating society, North East and Foreign Student Society, Green Cadets Group and Gender sensitisation committee are among the other noted societies of the college. Apart from that each academic department has its own dedicated society which organises various lectures, seminars, group discussions, debates, extempore, quizzes, fests etc.

== Societies ==
=== Student placements ===
Apart from the Common Placement Cell inaugurated in 2005, each department providing professional degree have their separate placement division to tailor made the recruitment procedure as per their curriculum and requirements.

== Notable alumni ==
1. Kapil Mishra, Ex- Minister, Delhi Government
2. Kamakhya Narayan Singh, Director- Film 'Bhor'
3. Milind Gawali, Indian actor and Director

== See also ==
- Deepak Pental
