= North Delhi district =

- District of Delhi
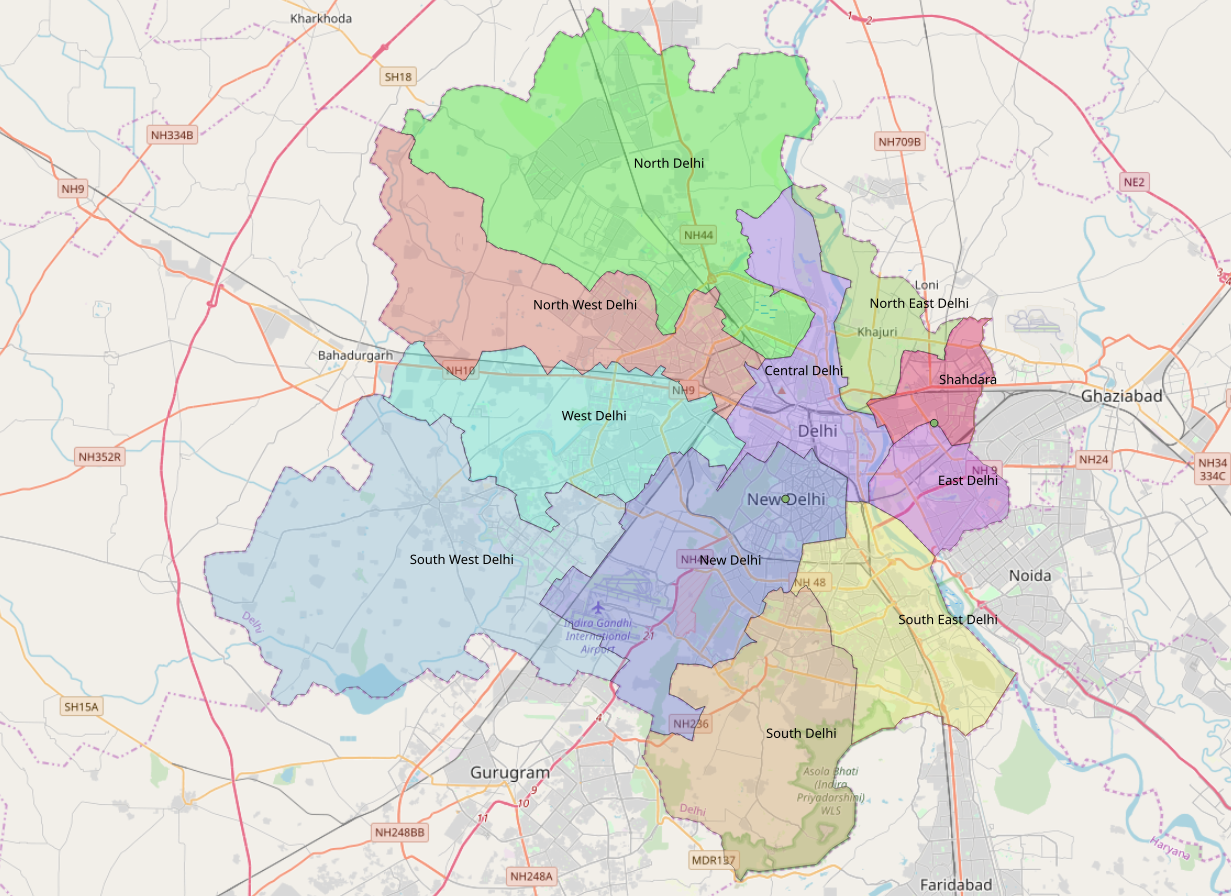
- Location in Delhi, India
- Coordinates: 28.676314°N 77.224977°E
- Country: India
- Union territory: Delhi
- Division: Delhi division
- Headquarters: Alipur

Government
  - Body: Government of Delhi
- Elevation: 213 m (699 ft)

Population (2011)
  - Total: 1,405,723

Languages
  - Official: Hindi, English, Haryanvi
- Time zone: UTC+5:30 (IST)
- PIN: 1100xx
- Lok Sabha constituency: North Delhi
- Civic agency: Municipal Corporation of Delhi (MCD)
- Website: dmnorth.delhi.gov.in

North Delhi district is an administrative district of the National Capital Territory of Delhi in India. Alipur is the administrative headquarters of this district. North Delhi is bounded by the Yamuna River and the district of Central Delhi on the east and by the district of North West Delhi to the west.

Administratively, the district is divided into three subdivisions, Model Town, Narela, and Alipur.

== Demographics ==
According to the 2011 census North Delhi had a population of 887,978, roughly equal to the nation of Fiji or the US state of Delaware. This gives it a ranking of 468th in India (out of a total of 640). The district had a population density of 14,973 inhabitants per square kilometre (38,780/sq mi). Its population growth rate over the decade 2001-2011 was 13.04%. North Delhi had a sex ratio of 871 females for every 1000 males, and a literacy rate of 86.81%.

After reorganization, the new North Delhi district had a population of 1,405,723, of which 1,236,984 (88.00%) lived in urban areas. North Delhi had a sex ratio of 852 females per 1000 males. Scheduled Castes made up 262,648 (18.68%) of the population.

Religions in North Delhi district (2011)
Religion	Percent
Hinduism	86.08%
Islam	9.71%
Sikhism	3.02%
Jainism	0.67%
Other or not stated	0.52%
Distribution of religions

Languages of North Delhi district (2011)
1. Hindi (85.8%)
2. Punjabi (4.71%)
3. Bhojpuri (1.82%)
4. Haryanvi (1.80%)
5. Bengali (1.26%)
6. Urdu (1.21%)
7. Others (3.36%)

At the time of the 2011 census, 85.84% of the population spoke Hindi, 4.71% Punjabi, 1.82% Bhojpuri 1.80% Haryanvi, 1.26% Bengali and 1.21% Urdu as their first language.

== See also ==
- Districts of Delhi
- North Delhi Municipal Corporation
