= Karawal Nagar =

- Census town
- Location in Delhi, India
- Coordinates: 28.725556°N 77.276944°E
- Country: India
- State: Delhi
- District: North East Delhi
- Lok Sabha Constituency: North East Delhi
- Vidhan Sabha Constituency: Karawal Nagar

Government
  - MP: Manoj Tiwari
  - MLA: Kapil Mishra

Population (2011)
  - Total: 224,281

Languages
  - Official: Hindi, English
- Time zone: UTC+5:30 (IST)
- PIN: 110094; 110090

Karawal Nagar is a census town in North East Delhi, India.

== Demographics ==
Historical population
Year	Pop.	±%
2001	148,624	—
2011	224,281	+50.9%
Source: Government of India

As of 2011 India census, Karawal Nagar had a population of 224,281. Karawal Nagar, was also in centre of the 2020 Delhi riots. .

Karawal Nagar is well connected to other parts of Delhi through Delhi Metro, DTC buses, Cabs, shared and hired auto rickshaws, and Gramin Sewa. The nearest metro station to Karawal Nagar is Johri Enclave Metro and Shiv Vihar Metro Station. The distance between Karawal Nagar and Johri Enclave metro station is just 1.8 km. Majority of people living here use Delhi Metro, shared auto and DTC buses.

== Nearby places ==
- Sabhapur 0 km
- Shahid Bhagat Singh Colony 0.9 km
- Police Training School 1.5 km
- Dayalpur 1.6 km
- Biharipur Extension 1.6 km
- Sonia Vihar 1.6 km
- CRPF Camp, Delhi-94 1.8 km
- Indira Vihar 1.9
- North East Delhi 2.4 km
- Ghaziabad District 19 km
- Delhi University = 7 km
- ISBT = 10 km
- Anand Vihar = 12.5 km
- Old Delhi Railway Station = 12 km
- New Delhi Railway Station = 15 km
- Rajiv Chowk (CP) = 22 km
- Sadat pur extn = 0.4 km
- David Sr. Sec. School = 1.1 km
- New Babu Nagar F.K Ansari = 1.2 km
- Govt. School Dayalpur = 1.2 km
- Dayalpur Re-settlement colony = 1.5 km
- Khajuri Khas Colony = 1.6 km
- New chauhan pur -500 meter.
