= North East Delhi district =

Coordinates: 28.6936°N 77.3073°E

- District of Delhi
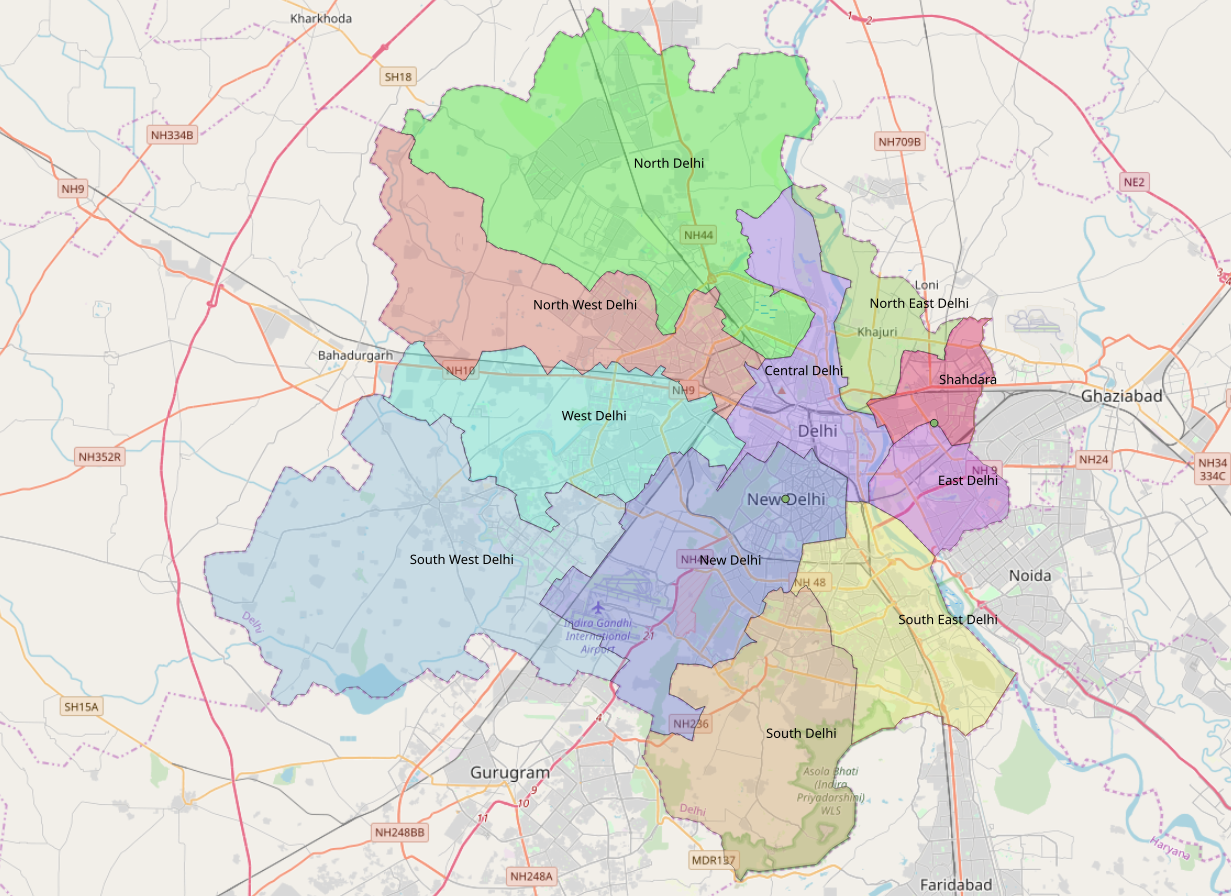
- Location of North East Delhi district in Delhi
- Country: India
- State: Delhi
- Division: Delhi Division
- Established: 1997
- Headquarters: Nand Nagri

Government
  - Lok Sabha MP: Manoj Tiwari
  - Deputy Commissioner: Mr Pankaj Kumar (IAS)

Area
  - District of Delhi: 62 km^{2} (24 sq mi)

Population (2011)
  - District of Delhi: 2,241,624
  - Density: 36,155/km^{2} (93,640/sq mi)
  - Urban: 2,220,097
  - Rural: 21,527

Demographics
  - Population Growth: 26.78%
  - Literacy: 83.09%
  - Sex Ratio: 886

Languages
  - Official: Hindi
- Time zone: UTC+5:30 (IST)
- PIN: 1100xx
- Website: dmnortheast.delhi.gov.in

North East Delhi district is one of the eleven administrative district of Delhi, India. The district was established in 1997. North East Delhi borders the Yamuna River on the west, Ghaziabad District to the north and east, East Delhi to the south, and North Delhi to the west across the Yamuna. Gokalpur,Karawal Nagar, Seelampur and Yamuna Vihar are 3 sub-divisions of this district.

== Demographics ==
Historical population
Year	Pop.	±% p.a.
1961	38,155	—
1971	157,262	+15.21%
1981	487,466	+11.98%
1991	1,085,250	+8.33%
2001	1,768,061	+5.00%
2011	2,241,624	+2.40%

According to the 2011 census, North East Delhi had a population of 2,241,624, roughly equal to the nation of Latvia, or the United States state of New Mexico. This gives it a ranking of 202nd in India (out of a total of 640). The district has a population density of 36,155 inhabitants per square kilometre (93,640/sq mi) . Its population growth rate over the decade 2001-2011 was 26.78%. North East Delhi has a sex ratio of 886 females for every 1000 males, and a literacy rate of 83.09%. The Scheduled Castes make up 16.67% of total district population.

=== Religion ===
Religion in North East Delhi
Religion	Percent
Hinduism	68.22
Islam	29.34
Jainism	1.1
Sikhism	0.78
Christianity	0.41
Buddhism	0.11
Not stated	0.05

Hindus are majority in the district consisting of 68.22% of total population, with a significant population of Muslims with 29.34%.

== Assembly Constituencies ==
- Karawal Nagar
- Mustafabad
- Seelampur
- Gokalpur
- Burari
- Timarpur
- Ghonda
- Baburpur

== Towns and villages ==
North East Delhi incorporates the following towns:

- Ashok Nagar
- Babarpur
- Brahmpuri
- Bhajanpura
- Brij puri
- Dayal Pur
- Dilshad Garden
- Gautampuri
- Ghonda
- Gokal Pur
- Harsh Vihar
- Jiwan Pur (Johri Pur)
- Karawal Nagar
- Khajoori Khas
- Mandoli
- Moujpur
- Mustafabad
- Nand Nagri
- New Usmanpur
- Sonia Vihar
- Saboli
- Sadat Pur Gujran
- Seemapuri
- Shiv Vihar
- Sunder Nagri
- Tukmeerpur
- Yamuna Vihar
- Zafrabad

Villages in North East Delhi are divided into three administrative villages: Shahdara with no sub-villages, Seema Purl with one sub village, Mandoli, and Seelam Pur with twelve sub-villages:

- Badar Pur Khadar
- Baqiabad
- Bihari Pur
- Garhi Mendu
- Khan Pur Dhani
- Pur Delhi
- Pur Shahdara
- Sabhapur Delhi
- Sabhapur Shahdara
- Sadat Pur
- Sherpur
- Tukhmir Pur

== See also ==
- List of districts of Delhi
