= Yamuna Vihar =

- Neighbourhood of Delhi
- Yamuna Vihar (B5)
- Location in Delhi, India
- Coordinates: 28.7009°N 77.2721°E
- Country: India
- State: Delhi
- District: North East Delhi
- Founder: DDA (Delhi Development Authority) Yogesh Gupta
- Named for: Yamuna River

Population
  - Total: 10,000

Languages
  - Official: Hindi
- Time zone: UTC+5:30 (IST)
- PIN: 110053

Yamuna Vihar is an affluent neighbourhood in North East Delhi. It houses the zonal headquarters (north east) of the Directorate of Education, Delhi. Yamuna Vihar is near to Shahdara, Maujpur and Bhajanpura. Kashmiri Gate ISBT is around 6 km, Anand Vihar around 7 km, Delhi University (north campus), 7 km and Connaught Place around 20 min and 30 min drive respectively from Yamuna Vihar.

It comprises blocks B-1 to B-5 & C-1 to C-12. Bhajanpura is said to be the A Block of Yamuna Vihar (as per the locals). Each block has a market of its own apart from a central Vardhman Complex. It has all the basic amenities maintained to a sufficiently pleasing level to meet the demands of the residents. Children's playgrounds, parks and parking lots are present in each of its blocks.

Yamuna Vihar is a major educational hub for northeast Delhi. It has Bhim Rao Ambedkar College of Delhi University and many other institutions. Ram Lila Ground (Hanuman Vatika) and Bhagat Singh Park attract people not only from Yamuna Vihar but also from nearby colonies during the Dussehra festival celebrations. Rath Wala Mandir, Arya Samaj Mandir, Jain Mandir, Siddarth Temple and Shri Peepleshwar Mahadev Mandir (Sai Temple) are major temples for the residents. Apart from this a Gurudwara, a Mosque and many other temples add to the religious aspect of the colony. Aggarwal Dharamshala, Brahmin samaj Dharamshala and community centers are also there. Yamuna Vihar is considered to be one of the most posh area in the district of North-East Delhi.

There are many parks in Yamuna Vihar. Some are dedicated to the usage of women (e.g. Mahila Park) and the elderly. These parks make Yamuna Vihar green and beautiful. There is proper Police patrolling and monitoring in the area.

Amongst its nearby areas, Yamuna Vihar is the only well-planned locality. The state government built the Signature Bridge, which is only at a distance of 4 km (2.5 mi), to improve transportation. The upcoming Delhi Metro project will also improve transport links.

In 2020 Yamuna Vihar was also affected by the delhi riots and currently suffering from a massive encroachment over it roads/lanes by the local residents themselves.

== Nearby Metro Stations ==
- Yamuna Vihar metro station
- Gokulpuri metro station
- Maujpur Metro Station
- Shastri Park metro station
- Seelampur metro station
