= Karawal Nagar Assembly constituency =

Constituency of the Delhi legislative assembly in India

Coordinates: 28.73°N 77.27°E

Karawal Nagar
- Constituency No. 70 for the Delhi Legislative Assembly

Constituency details
- Country: India
- Region: North India
- State: Delhi
- District: North East Delhi
- Established: 1993
- Reservation: None

Member of Legislative Assembly
- 8th Delhi Legislative Assembly
- Incumbent Kapil Mishra
- Party: BJP
- Elected year: 2025

Karawal Nagar legislative assembly constituency is a Vidhan Sabha constituency in Delhi. It is a part of the North East Delhi Lok Sabha constituency.

== Members of the Legislative Assembly ==
Year	Name	Party
1993	Ram Pal	Bharatiya Janata Party
1998	Mohan Singh Bisht	Bharatiya Janata Party
2003	Mohan Singh Bisht	Bharatiya Janata Party
2008	Mohan Singh Bisht	Bharatiya Janata Party
2013	Mohan Singh Bisht	Bharatiya Janata Party
2015	Kapil Mishra	Aam Aadmi Party
2020	Mohan Singh Bisht	Bharatiya Janata Party
2025	Kapil Mishra	Bharatiya Janata Party

== Election results ==
=== 2025 ===
Delhi Assembly elections, 2025: Karawal Nagar
Party	Candidate	Votes	%	±%
BJP	Kapil Mishra	107,367	53.39	▲2.80
AAP	Manoj Tyagi	84,012	41.78	▼4.51
INC	P. K. Mishra	3,921	1.95	▲0.78
BSP	Devendra Bhaiya	1,887	0.94	▲0.51
CPI(M)	Ashok Agarwal	457	0.23	▲0.01
NOTA	None of the above	709	0.35	+0.15
Majority		23,355	11.61	+7.31
Turnout		201,084		
BJP hold		Swing	+2.80	

=== 2020 ===
Delhi Assembly elections, 2020: Karawal Nagar
Party	Candidate	Votes	%	±%
BJP	Mohan Singh Bisht	96,721	50.59	+16.85
AAP	Durgesh Pathak	88,498	46.29	−13.55
INC	Arbind Singh	2,242	1.17	−1.98
BSP	Nathu Ram	824	0.43	−0.86
CPI(M)	Ranjit Tiwari	414	0.22	−0.19
NOTA	None of the above	373	0.20	−0.32
Majority		8,223	4.30	−21.80
Turnout		1,91,291	67.55	−2.28
BJP gain from AAP		Swing	+16.85	

=== 2015 ===
Delhi Assembly elections, 2015: Karawal Nagar
Party	Candidate	Votes	%	±%
AAP	Kapil Mishra	101,865	59.84	+27.37
BJP	Mohan Singh Bisht	57,434	33.74	−0.90
INC	Satan Pal Dayma	5,362	3.15	−11.58
BSP	Dharmendra Singh	2,202	1.29	−0.60
CPI(M)	Ranjit Tiwari	712	0.41	N/A
NOTA	None of the above	888	0.52	−0.12
Majority		44,431	26.10	+23.93
Turnout		1,70,236	69.83	
Registered electors		2,43,774		
AAP gain from BJP		Swing	+14.14	

=== 2013 ===
Delhi Assembly elections, 2013: Karawal Nagar
Party	Candidate	Votes	%	±%
BJP	Mohan Singh Bisht	49,262	34.64	−8.16
AAP	Kapil Mishra	46,179	32.47	
INC	Beg Raj Singh	20,950	14.73	−0.05
IND	Satan Pal Dayma	19,362	13.62	−8.62
BSP	Rajbir Singh	2,688	1.89	−7.10
NOTA	None	911	0.64	
Majority		3,083	2.17	−18.39
Turnout		1,42,225	68.40	
BJP hold		Swing	-8.16	

=== 2008 ===
Delhi Assembly elections, 2008: Karawal Nagar
Party	Candidate	Votes	%	±%
BJP	Mohan Singh Bisht	43,980	42.80	+0.45
Independent	Satan Pal Dayma	22,852	22.24	
INC	Diwan Singh Nayal	15,182	14.78	−13.20
BSP	Harender Kumar Sharma	9,233	8.99	−10.16
CPI(M)	Anmol Choudhri	2,198	2.14	
SP	Haseeb	1,318	1.28	−1.62
IJP	Jugal Kishor	1,022	0.99	
SAP	Sanjay Sharma	977	0.95	
Independent	Desh Raj	808	0.79	
NBNP	Mohd Nafis	687	0.67	
Parivartan Samaj Party	Shiv Kumar Sahu	555	0.54	
Independent	Harish Tyagi	514	0.50	
JD(S)	Parvez	456	0.44	
RJD	Afzal Ahmed	440	0.43	
Independent	Lata Sharma	429	0.42	
Independent	Kavita Tyagi	422	0.41	
Independent	Sabir Khan	339	0.33	
LJP	Mohd. Abrar	334	0.33	
Independent	R. C. Ragav	315	0.31	
Loktantrik Samajwadi	Vipin Sandilya	208	0.20	
UNLP	Sandhya Agarwal	175	0.17	
Independent	Kamla Devi	171	0.17	
Independent	Neelam Saifi	133	0.13	
Majority		21,128	20.56	+6.19
Turnout		1,02,748	53.2	−2.72
BJP hold		Swing	+0.45	

=== 2003 ===
Delhi Assembly elections, 2003: Karawal Nagar
Party	Candidate	Votes	%	±%
BJP	Mohan Singh Bisht	44,884	42.35	+13.18
INC	Hasan Ahmed	29,657	27.98	+2.65
BSP	Sher Khan	20,291	19.15	+15.07
SP	Sher Khan Malik	3,076	2.90	−4.22
SS	Anand Trivedi	1,743	1.64	
NLP	Saleemuddin	1,412	1.33	
RTKP	Hira Lal	778	0.73	
Independent	Navin Chandra Lokhchora	706	0.67	
Independent	Mohd. Arif	597	0.56	
RLD	Ram Kumar Sharma	573	0.54	
Independent	Gyan Singh	488	0.46	
Independent	Sabir Khan	409	0.39	
Independent	Tej Singh	349	0.33	
Independent	Veer Narayan Kaushik	234	0.22	
JPJD	Tufani Nishad	189	0.18	
JKNPP	Pankaj Sharma	173	0.16	
Independent	V.K. Gupta	169	0.16	
RSP(U)	Shabuddin	140	0.13	
ABHM	Rajesh Singh	114	0.11	
Majority		15,227	14.37	+10.52
Turnout		1,05,982	55.92	−0.19
BJP hold		Swing	+13.18	

=== 1998 ===
Delhi Assembly elections, 1998: Karawal Nagar
Party	Candidate	Votes	%	±%
BJP	Mohan Singh Bisht	23,191	29.17	−0.80
INC	Zile Singh	20,133	25.33	+4.37
Independent	Hazi Mangta	9,410	11.84	
Independent	Jagdish Pradhan	8,530	10.73	
SP	Keshu Prasad	5,657	7.12	−8.08
BSP	Israr Ali	3,243	4.08	
Independent	Ram Singh	2,742	3.45	
Independent	Jai Prakash	1,865	2.35	
NLP	Irfan	1,695	2.13	
Independent	Sat Pal Singh	776	0.98	
JD	M.Shakeel Malik	663	0.83	
Independent	Prem Pal	550	0.69	
BKD(J)	Satyvir Singh	420	0.53	
Independent	Surender	274	0.34	
Independent	Shri Ram	189	0.24	
AWP	Mohd. Islamuddin	97	0.12	
Independent	Ramji Lal Kasana	59	0.07	
Majority		3,058	3.85	−5.16
Turnout		80,789	56.11	−4.31
BJP hold		Swing	-0.80	

=== 1993 ===
Delhi Assembly elections, 1993: Karawal Nagar
Party	Candidate	Votes	%	±%
BJP	Ram Pal	18,322	29.97	
INC	Kalyan Singh	12,816	20.96	
SP	Chand M.A.	9,292	15.20	
JD	Kadam Singh	8,514	13.92	
Independent	Jagdish	6,320	10.34	
Independent	Raje Singh Rawat	2,067	3.38	
Independent	Saeed Ahmad	945	1.55	
DPP	Nand Kishore Jha	681	1.11	
JP	Ajit	616	1.01	
LPI	Tilak Raj Sharma	279	0.46	
FBL(M)	Nathu Ram	200	0.33	
Independent	Mahatma Gandhi M.L.	174	0.28	
Independent	Vishwas Sharma Shandilya	170	0.28	
Independent	Mahender Pal	162	0.26	
Independent	Laltesh	115	0.19	
Independent	Ravinder Sinha	115	0.19	
Doordarshi Party	Raj Kumar Gupta	73	0.12	
Independent	Vishal Anand	56	0.09	
Independent	Suresh Kuma	53	0.09	
Mukt Bharat	Laxmi Prasad Gaur	50	0.08	
Independent	Mahender Dev Gaur	50	0.08	
Independent	Abdul Wahab	33	0.05	
Independent	Haji Shafiq Ahmed Mansoori	20	0.03	
Independent	Sat Pal	19	0.03	
Majority		5,506	9.01	
Turnout		62,835	60.42	
BJP win (new seat)				
