= Kapil Mishra =

Indian politician (born 1980)

Cabinet Minister, Government of Delhi
- Incumbent
- Assumed office 20 February 2025
- Lieutenant Governor: Vinai Kumar Saxena
- Chief Minister: Rekha Gupta
- Ministry and Departments: List: Law & Justice; Labour; Employment; Development; Art & Culture; Language; Tourism
- Preceded by: Gopal Rai

Member of Delhi Legislative Assembly
- Incumbent
- Assumed office 8 February 2025
- Preceded by: Mohan Singh Bisht
- Constituency: Karawal Nagar

Vice President, Bharatiya Janata Party, Delhi
- In office 5 August 2023 – Present
- National President: Jagat Prakash Nadda
- President: Virendra Sachdeva

Cabinet Minister, Government of Delhi
- In office 2015–2017
- Governor: Najeeb Jung
- Ministry: Water Resource Management
- Chief Minister: Arvind Kejriwal

Member of Delhi Legislative Assembly
- In office 14 February 2015 – 2 August 2019
- Preceded by: Mohan Singh Bisht
- Succeeded by: Mohan Singh Bisht
- Constituency: Karawal Nagar

Personal details
- Born: 13 November 1980 (age 45) Delhi, India
- Party: Bharatiya Janata Party (2019–present)
- Other political affiliations: Aam Aadmi Party (2013–2017)
- Spouse: Pretty Mishra
- Children: 2
- Established: Youth For Justice

Kapil Mishra (born 13 November 1980) is an Indian politician and Cabinet Minister, Government of Delhi. Before joining the Bharatiya Janata Party (BJP) in 2019, Mishra was an Aam Aadmi Party (AAP) MLA representing Karawal Nagar in the Sixth Legislative Assembly of Delhi. He is also vice president of the Delhi BJP.

He served as the Water Resources Minister in the AAP-led government in Delhi under Arvind Kejriwal. He was later removed from the cabinet amid allegations of irregularities in his ministry's work. Subsequently, he accused Kejriwal and former Health Minister Satyendar Jain of corruption, claiming a bribe of ₹2 crore (equivalent to ₹2.8 crore or US$290,000 in 2023) had been exchanged. He approached the Anti-Corruption Bureau of Delhi with these allegations but could not substantiate them. Later, the Lokayukta dismissed Kejriwal’s name from the case due to a lack of evidence.

Mishra later alleged more instances of corruption in the AAP government under Arvind Kejriwal. Being a member and MLA of AAP, he was supporting, sharing stage events for the BJP and was also campaigning against his own party in the 2019 Indian general election. These events and instances of anti-party activities were brought to the notice of the Speaker Ram Niwas Goel of Delhi Legislative Assembly and Mishra was disqualified as an MLA on grounds of defection and anti-party activities.

Mishra won as MLA in 2025 Assembly elections from Karawal Nagar constituency.

== Activism ==
As co-founder and coordinator of "Youth for Justice", a New Delhi based youth action group that works on spontaneous issues that need cognizance, he has led the youth protest on various socio-economic issues including Jessica Lal murder trial, issues of Farmers suicides in various parts of country, encroachment on the Yamuna River bed and various other issues.

He protested against the cases of corruption in Commonwealth Games 2010 held in New Delhi and has written a pamphlet "It's Common v/s Wealth" highlighting the various scams and social and environmental concerns related with CWG 2010. Since 2007, He raised his voice against the anti-people development approach that is being practiced by authorities in the name of Commonwealth Games in New Delhi.

He raised his voice inside Delhi Assembly against exploitation of Yamuna in the name of Commonwealth Games and got detained for the action. He has initiated and participated in several protests against exploitation of common people and common resources in the name of "Growth and Development".

He has also prepared a report as citizen journalist for CNN-IBN on encroachment on river Yamuna and also has exposed the issues of violation of labor laws at Games sites by camping outside Games village along with other members of "Youth for Justice".

He raised his voice and filed a Public Interest Litigation (PIL) in Supreme Court for adequate compensation for Vishnu Tiwari, a falsely accused rape convict who was declared innocent after spending 20 years in jail under the SC/ST Act.

== Political career ==
Mishra contested the 2015 Delhi Legislative Assembly election as the AAP candidate from Karawal Nagar constituency. He won the election, defeating his rival BJP candidate Mohan Singh Bisht by a margin of 44,431 votes.

In 2017, the AAP Government sacked him from the post of Water Minister of Delhi. Later submitted documents to the Anti-Corruption Branch (ACB) to back his allegations that Delhi CM Arvind Kejriwal delayed the probe into a Rs.400 crore tanker scam. Kapil Mishra was suspended from the party’s primary membership a day after he leveled corruption charges against Arvind Kejriwal and his former cabinet colleague Satyendra Kumar Jain. However, his opponents allege that his allegations have turned out to be baseless as CBI and Lokayukta gave him a clean chit in this alleged ₹2 Cr. bribery case.

On 2 August 2019, he was disqualified from the Legislative Assembly under the anti-defection law. He officially joined Bharatiya Janta Party on 17 August 2019.

On the 5th August 2023, Mishra was appointed Vice President of the Delhi unit. He was named as BJP's candidate from Karawal Nagar constituency in the 2025 Delhi Legislative Assembly election and won. He became cabinet minister in Delhi government in 2025.

== Controversies ==
=== Statements on Narendra Modi ===
Before joining BJP, Mishra had made many controversial statements against PM Narendra Modi, which often went on being extremely personal and hurtful. These included his allegations as regards a Gujarat girl as well as his calling Modi an ISI agent. Subsequently after becoming a BJP leader, Mishra has turned into an ardent Modi admirer.

=== 2020 Delhi Assembly election ===
In January 2020, he stirred up a controversy when he likened the upcoming 2020 Delhi Legislative Assembly election to an India versus Pakistan contest. He tweeted, "There will be a contest on Delhi Roads between India and Pakistan on February 8". A show-cause notice was issued to Mishra by the Delhi poll authorities for "violation of the model code of conduct and the Representation of the People Act". Election Commission of India also imposed a 48-hour campaigning ban on him over his controversial tweets which tried to aggravate differences between two communities.

=== North East Delhi Riots ===
On 23 February 2020, Mishra was alleged to have publicly spoken out in a rally against the anti-CAA protesters, in the presence of the DCP of North East Delhi district, Ved Prakash Surya. (Note: Previously, on 17 December 2019, violence occurred during the CAA-protests in the Seelampur area, in North East Delhi. On 3 January 2020, DCP Surya told media that adequate security personnel and proper security arrangements were in place in the Seelampur area and no further gatherings and violence were expected.) Mishra is said to have tried to intimidate the police to remove the protesters from Jaffrabad and Chand Bagh areas in three days' time, allegedly threatening to take matters into his own hands, "hit the streets" and "not remain peaceful" in the event of their failure. After the rally, Mishra himself posted a video of him threatening the police on Twitter. Within a few hours of Kapil Mishra's rally, violent clashes started between the supporters and the people against CAA.

Relatives of the people who died in the violence accused Mishra of inciting the clashes and asked for his immediate arrest and strict punishment. The father of a victim Rahul Solanki claimed that Mishra instigated the fire and returned to his home, while their children are becoming victims of the violence. He added that people will continue losing their children until Mishra was arrested.

BJP's East Delhi MP, Gautam Gambhir, on 25 February stated that "Kapil Mishra's speech is not acceptable" and asked for strict action to be taken against the people responsible for violence, regardless of which political party they belonged to.

Five separate pleas seeking that a First Information Report (FIR) be registered against Mishra were filed. All the pleas deal with speeches made by Mishra over February 23 and 24, 2020, in North East Delhi’s Maujpur area.

Activist Harsh Mander had filed the first plea on February 26, 2020, in the Delhi High Court seeking action against Mishra, Anurag Thakur, Parvesh Verma and Abhay Verma. A Bench headed by Justice S. Muralidhar played videos of Mishra’s speeches in court, noting that they ex facie appeared to constitute the crime of hate speech. The Bench urged police to seriously consider the consequences of delaying FIRs. That same night, Justice Muralidhar got transferred to the Punjab and Haryana High Court. Mander subsequently withdrew his plea, to approach a lower court in 2021. His plea before the Patiala House Court remains pending.

Mohammad Ilyas, a resident of a riot-affected area, presented a complaint before Karkardooma court accusing Mishra and his associates of vandalising carts belonging to Muslims and Dalits in Kardampuri, even as police officials watched. The plea was heard by the for over three years before being returned the application to him, in February 2024, holding that since Mishra was a former MLA, only a special court constituted for trial of cases against MPs/MLA court could hear the complaint. Ilyas then filed his complaint before a Special MP/MLA court in Rouse Avenue, which ordered “further investigation” into Ilyas’s allegations against Mishra, rejecting the police theory that Mishra had no role. On November 10, 2025, however, Special Court set aside the ACJM’s order, ruling that it suffered from “a serious jurisdictional error” and “jurisdictional overreach”. After this, on 13 March 2026, the ACJM dismissed Ilyas’s demand for an FIR.

The third petition against Mishra was filed by the university’s students in 2020, seeking an FIR for hate speech. This plea remains pending in the High Court, despite a December 2021 Supreme Court order requesting it to dispose of the matter “preferably within a period of three months”.

North East Delhi resident Jami Rizvi's plea is pending in a Shahdara court since March 2020,where he alleged that Mishra incited communal violence by delivering inflammatory speeches and brandishing a firearm while directing a mob to assault anti-CAA protesters.

The fifth complaint was filed by Muhamad Waseem, also a North-East Delhi resident, in November 2020, which is stuck in a jurisdictional loop between a regular magistrate in Shahdara and a Special MP/MLA Court.

In addition, an FIR was registered by police under Section 125 of the Representation of the People Act, on a complaint by a Returning Officer regarding Mishra’s tweets during the 2020 Delhi Assembly elections. In June 2024, a magistrate took cognizance of the chargesheet in this case and summoned Mishra. The BJP leader challenged this, but on March 7, 2025, Special Judge dismissed his revision petition. Mishra then approached the Delhi High Court, arguing that the digital evidence provided by X (formerly Twitter) regarding his account was in a “coded language” and incomprehensible. On August 28, 2025, the High Court stayed the framing of charges, requesting the trial court to defer hearings until the prosecution could provide interpreted documents to the petitioner.

== Personal life ==
Mishra is the son of Annapurna Mishra, a former mayor of East Delhi affiliated with the BJP and Rameshwar Mishra "Pankaj", a former socialist leader, thinker and author. Mishra completed his education from Dr. Bhim Rao Ambedkar College.
