= List of districts of Delhi =

There are 13 administrative or revenue districts in Delhi, in the National Capital Region, India, all of which fall under the Delhi division. Each of these revenue districts is headed by a District Magistrate (DM) also called Deputy Commissioner (DC), These 13 districts are divided into 39 sub-divisions of Delhi, each headed by a Sub-Divisional Magistrate (SDM). The district administration of Delhi is the enforcement department for all kinds of the Government of Delhi's policies and exercises supervisory powers over numerous other functionaries of the government.

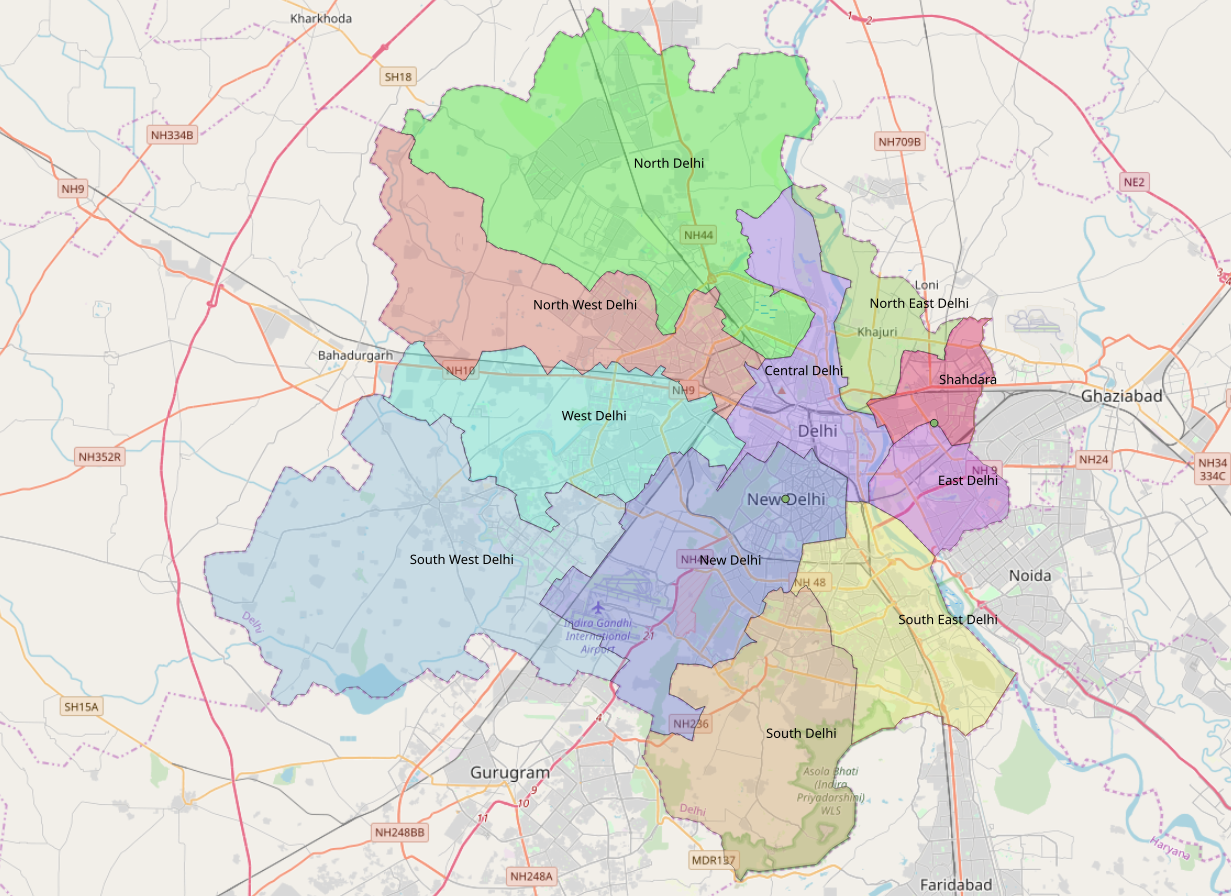
Districts of Delhi until 2025

The District magistrate/ Deputy Commissioner reports to the Divisional Commissioner who is ex-officio Director of Civil Defence, Inspector General of Stamps and Registration and Additional Chief Secretary/Principal Secretary/Secretary of Revenue Department of Delhi (as may be the case).

New Delhi serves as the capital of India and is the seat of all three branches of the government, Executive (Rashtrapati Bhavan), Legislature (Sansad Bhavan) and Judiciary (Supreme Court). Similarly, Delhi is divided into 15 Police Districts, each headed by an IPS officer of the rank of Deputy Commissioner of Police (DCP). These 15 police districts are divided into 66 police sub-divisions of Delhi, each headed by an Assistant Commissioner of Police (ACP).

== History ==
The present system of administration in Delhi can be traced back to the British India (1858–1947). During the Delhi Durbar of 1911, the capital of India was shifted from Calcutta in the erstwhile Bengal Presidency to New Delhi. Later the status of Delhi was elevated to a union territory in November 1956. After the 69th Constitutional (Amendment) Act of 1991 came into force, Delhi was formally renamed as the National Capital Territory of Delhi or NCT of Delhi.

During the 1970s, Delhi had only four administrative districts i.e. North, South, Central and New Delhi. Between January 1997 and September 2012, there were nine administrative districts and 27 sub-divisions. In September 2012, two new administrative districts, viz. South East Delhi and Shahdara were added to the city's map.

In 1978, the Delhi Police Act was promulgated, by which Delhi came under the Police Commissionerate system. Since then almost all powers with respect to maintenance of law & order with the Deputy Commissioner were vested in the Commissioner of Delhi Police (as per the Criminal procedure code or CrPC).

The erstwhile Municipal Corporation of Delhi (MCD) came into existence in April 1958. Later in January 2012, MCD was trifurcated into North, South and East MCD. In 2022, the 3 municipal corporations were merged again into the newly founded Municipal Corporation of Delhi which is headed by Municipal Commissioner.

In December 2025, the Cabinet of Delhi government approved the reorganization of its 11 districts into 13 districts to align the revenue district boundaries with the 12 zones of Municipal Corporation of Delhi, New Delhi Municipal Council and Delhi Cantonment. Three new districts – Old Delhi, Central North Delhi and Outer North Delhi were carved out of existing districts, while the Shahdara district was dissolved. The number of sub-districts were increased from 33 to 39. Delhi government notified that the reorganization will take effect from 1 January 2026.

== List of districts of Delhi ==
In December 2025, the Delhi government cabinet approved a major administrative reorganization of the National Capital Territory, expanding the number of revenue districts from 11 to 13. This restructuring was undertaken to align revenue district boundaries with the 12 administrative zones of the Municipal Corporation of Delhi (MCD), the New Delhi Municipal Council (NDMC), and the Delhi Cantonment.

The reorganization, which officially took effect on 1 January 2026, dissolved the former Shahdara district and carved out three new districts: Old Delhi, Central North Delhi, and Outer North Delhi. Concurrently, the total number of sub-divisions (tehsils) was increased from 33 to 39. All 13 districts fall under the single Delhi division, and currently function as the primary sub-agencies for administrative implementations such as the city's economic census operations.

Note: Population and area figures below reflect data prior to the 2026 administrative reorganization.

List of Districts and Sub-divisions in Delhi
No.	District	Population	Area (km²)	Sub-divisions (Tehsils)
1	Central Delhi	578,671	23	Patel Nagar, Karol Bagh
2	Central North Delhi	–	–	Shakur Basti, Shalimar Bagh, Model Town
3	East Delhi	1,707,725	49	Gandhi Nagar, Vishwas Nagar, Patparganj
4	New Delhi	133,713	35	New Delhi, Delhi Cantonment
5	North Delhi	883,418	59	Burari, Adarsh Nagar, Badli
6	North East Delhi	2,240,749	56	Karawal Nagar, Gokal Puri, Yamuna Vihar, Shahdara
7	North West Delhi	3,651,261	234.4	Kirari, Nangloi Jat, Rohini
8	Old Delhi	–	–	Sadar Bazar, Chandni Chowk
9	Outer North Delhi	–	–	Mundka, Narela, Bawana
10	South Delhi	2,733,752	249	Chhatarpur, Malviya Nagar, Deoli, Mehrauli
11	South East Delhi	637,775	102	Jangpura, Kalkaji, Badarpur
12	South West Delhi	2,292,363	421	Najafgarh, Matiala, Dwarka, Bijwasan
13	West Delhi	2,531,583	131	Vikaspuri, Janakpuri, Rajouri Garden

== List of Municipalities in Delhi ==
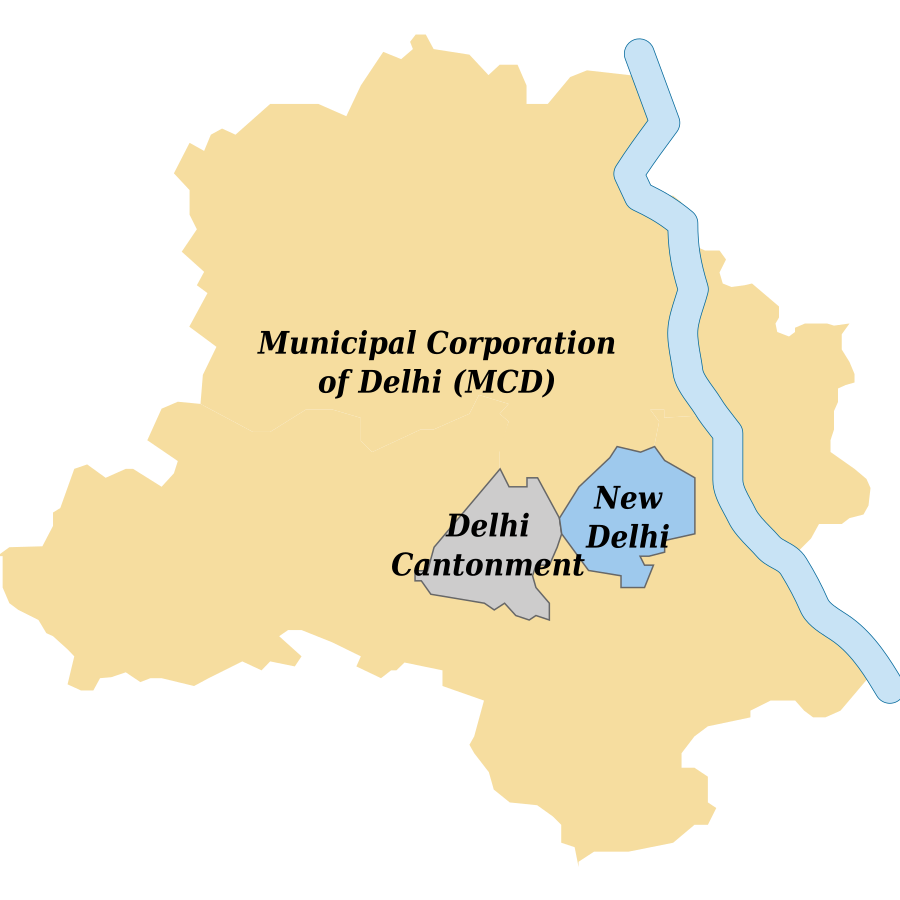
Municipalities of Delhi

There are three Municipalities (1 Municipal Corporation, 1 Municipal Council and 1 Cantonment Board) in Delhi. These are as follows:

Municipality	Jurisdiction
Municipal Corporation of Delhi	12 Zones (Centre, South, West, Najafgarh, Rohini, Civil Lines, Karol Bagh, SP-City, Keshavpuram, Narela, Shahdara North & Shahdara South)
New Delhi Municipal Council	New Delhi
Delhi Cantonment Board	Delhi Cantonment

== See also ==
- Districts of Delhi Police
