= Khurd and Kalan =

Khurd and Kalan (Urdu: خرد اور کلاں, Hindi: ख़ुर्द और कलाँ, Punjabi: Gurmukhi: ਖ਼ੁਰਦ ਅਤੇ ਕਲਾਂ, Shahmukhi: خرد تے کلاں) are administrative designations used in India and Pakistan to indicate the mainland (Khurd) and extension (Kalan) of a town, village or settlement.

They are usually added after place names. For instance, Berote Khurd and Berote Kalan in Abbottabad District in the Khyber-Pakhtunkhwa province, Dangoh Khurd in Una District of Himachal Pradesh and the many villages in Delhi such as Holambi Khurd and Holambi Kalan, Pooth Khurd and Pooth Kalan and Mangolpur Khurd and Mangolpur Kalan in North west and north districts of Delhi and the famous Dariba Kalan jewellery market in Delhi, there was also a smaller street nearby, known as Dariba Khurd or Chhota Dariba, both mean small, now known as Kinari Bazaar.

In some parts of the former Maratha territory, Budruk is used instead of "Kalan." It is a corruption of the Persian word for "greater." In Manipur, Khullen and Khunou are used.

== Adjacent places with Khurd and Kalan combination ==
This list contains place names that are adjacent to each other having the same first name with Kurd and Kalan as second name respectively. Alphabetical entries with no red links.

=== India ===
- Mehal Khurd and Mehal kalan, Barnala district, Punjab, India
- Mundhal Khurd and Mundhal Kalan, Bhiwani district, Haryana, India
- Bhainsru Khurd and Bhainsru Kalan, Rohtak district, Haryana, India
- Rani Khurd and Rani Kalan, Pali district, Rajasthan, India
- Haibowal Kalan and Haibowal Khurd, Ludhiana district, India
- Tikri Khurd and Tikri Kalan, Delhi, India
- Jhojhu Khurd and Jhojhu Kalan, Charkhi dadri district, Haryana, India
- Urlana Khurd and Urlana Kalan, Panipat district, Haryana, India
- Kang Khurd and Kang Kalan, Jalandhar district, Punjab, India
- Abiana Khurd and Abiana Kalan, Ropar district, Punjab, India
- Barian khurd and Barian kalan, Hoshiarpur district, Punjab, India
- Kosi Khurd and Kosi Kalan, Mathura district, Uttar Pradesh, India
- Kharsod kalan and kharsod khurd, district Ujjain, Madhya Pradesh, India

=== Pakistan ===
- Berote Khurd and Berote Kalan, Khyber-Pakhtunkhwa, Pakistan
- Buchal Khurd and Buchal Kalan, Chakwal, Punjab, Pakistan

== Other solo places with either Khurd or Kalan ==
This list contains solitary place names that have either Khurd or Kalan as second name, but without a corresponding adjacent village to complete the pair. Alphabetical entries with no red links.

=== Afghanistan ===
- Anjuman-i-Khurd, Afghanistan

=== India ===
==== Telangana ====
- Kongara Kalan
- Marpally Kalan
- Ravulapally Khurd
- Thupra Khurd
- Toole Khurd
- Uppal Kalan

==== Bihar ====
- Madhaul Khurd

==== Delhi ====
- Dariba Kalan - Dariba Khurd (now known as Kinari Bazaar), Delhi, India
- Dichaon Khurd
- Khera Khurd
- Rajpur Khurd

==== Haryana ====
- Asan Khurd
- Baliar Khurd (Rewari)
- Berwala Khurd
- Bhattu Kalan
- Dhabi Kalan
- Jhojhu Khurd
- Nanu Khurd

==== Himachal Pradesh ====
- Dangoh Khurd

==== Jharkhand ====
- Kabra Khurd
- Jori Kalan

==== Karnataka ====
- Ugar Khurd

==== Madhya Pradesh ====
- Khardon Kalan
- Lidhora Khurd
- Tillore Khurd
- Soyat Kalan
- Tonk Khurd
- Kanadi Khurd

==== Maharashtra ====
- Anjani Khurd
- Bavdhan Khurd
- Bhikawadi Khurd
- Ghoti Khurd
- Lahit Khurd

==== Punjab ====
- Akbarpur Khurd
- Bhikhi Khurd
- Dham Talwandi Khurd
- Buttar Kalan, Moga
- Ghuman Khurd
- Jajja Khurd
- Khatkar Kalan
- Haibowal khurd, Ludhiana
- Nangal Khurd, Hoshiarpur
- Pakho Kalan
- Rure Ke Kalan
- Rurka Kalan
- Rurkee Kalan
- Talwandi Kalan

Chapar Chiri Khurd, Sirhind

==== Rajasthan ====
- Bairathal Kallan
- Dhuan Kalan
- Jonaicha Khurd
- Ramjipura Khurd

==== Uttar Pradesh ====
- Bal Khurd
- Barkachha Khurd
- Bhora Kalan
- Dharoti Khurd
- Dugauli Khurd
- Kaserua Khurd
- Khajuri Khurd
- Kosi Kalan
- Malava Khurd
- Palia Kalan
- Rajpur Khurd, Mainpuri
- Rampur Khurd

=== Pakistan ===
==== Khyber Pakhtunkhwa ====
- Kotli Khurd (Nowshera District), Khyber Pakhtunkhwa, Pakistan

==== Punjab ====
- Attock Khurd
- Aujla Khurd
- Chakori Khurd
- Dhool Khurd
- Jamber Khurd
- Jamsher Khurd
- Jataria Khurd
- Khasala Khurd
- Khinger Khurd
- Kotli Khurd (Mandi Bahauddin District)
- Mohla Khurd
- Multan Khurd
- Nakka Khurd
- Renala Khurd
- Buchal Khurd
- Buchal Kalan
- Bhiri kalan
- Bhiri Khurd

== See also ==
- Pur and Pura
