= Budruk =

Suffix used in Indian place names

Budruk is a suffix found in the place names of the former Maratha territory in India. It is similar to Kalan found in northern India, and is used to distinguish two segments of a village or two villages with the same name. "Khurd" means smaller, and "Budruk" means greater; both the words are of Persian origin.

Villages with the designation Budruk include:

- Bavdhan Budruk, a suburb in west of Pune in the Indian state of Maharashtra
- Ghoti Budruk, census town in Nashik district in the Indian state of Maharashtra (cf. Ghoti Khurd)
- Kusgaon Budruk, census town in Pune district in the Indian state of Maharashtra
- Nimbhore Budruk, census town in Jalgaon district in the Indian state of Maharashtra
- Pimpode Budruk, one of the largest villages in Koregaon tehsil in the Satara District of Maharashtra state of India
- Ugar Budruk, village in the southern state of Karnataka, India (cf. Ugar Khurd)
- Vadhu Budruk, the place in Shirur Tehsil of the Pune district
- Kondhwa Budruk, the place in Pisoli of Pune District
- Taroda Budruk, a place in Nanded city in Nanded District, Maharashtra
