= Khasala =

Khasala may refer to:

- Khasala Khurd, lesser Khasala, village in Punjab, Pakistan
- Khasala Kalan, greater Khasala, village in Punjab, Pakistan
