= Kotli Khurd =

Kotli Khurd is the name of two villages in Pakistan:

- Kotli Khurd (Nowshera District)
- Kotli Khurd (Mandi Bahauddin District)
