= Kang =

Kang may refer to:

== Places ==
=== Historical ===
- Kham (康), also transliterated as Kang, an area of eastern Tibet and western Sichuan
- Kangju, an ancient kingdom in Central Asia
- Xikang, a province of the Republic of China from 1939 to 1955

=== Present ===
==== Iran ====
- Kang, Isfahan, a village
- Kang, Kerman, a village
- Kang, Razavi Khorasan, a village

==== Elsewhere ====
- Kang District, Afghanistan
- Kang, Botswana, a village
- Kang County, Gansu, China
- Kang Kalan, Punjab, India

== People ==
=== Royalty ===
- Tai Kang (reigned 2117–2088 BC), third sovereign of the Xia Dynasty
- King Kang of Zhou (reigned 1020–996 BC or 1005–978 BC), third sovereign of the Chinese Zhou Dynasty
- King Kang of Chu (died 545 BC), in ancient China
- Duke Kang of Qi (died 379 BC), titular ruler of Qi
- Emperor Kang of Jin (322–344), of the Eastern Jin Dynasty

=== Surname ===
- Kang (Chinese surname), a Chinese surname (康)
- Kang (Korean surname), a common Korean surname (강; 姜)
- David Kang, an Australian barrister and gunman
- Eugene Kang (born 1984), Special Projects Coordinator and Confidential Assistant to U.S. President Barack Obama
- Jimmy Kang, American music producer and executive
- Kang Kek Iew (1942–2020), leader of the Cambodian Khmer Rouge, convicted of crimes against humanity
- Kristi Kang (born 1984), American voice actress affiliated with Funimation

== Characters ==
- Kang and Kodos, green one-eyed aliens in The Simpsons
- Kang the Conqueror, a Marvel Comics supervillain
- Kang (Star Trek), a Klingon warrior in Star Trek television series
- The Kangs, two warring gangs in the "Paradise Towers" 1987 Doctor Who episode
- Liu Kang, a character in the Mortal Kombat series
- Kang the Mad, a character in Jade Empire 2005 video game
- Meng Kang, a character in the Water Margin
- Suzie Kang, an object-tracker in The Lost Room mini-series
- Kang Tongbi or Widow Kang, a character in The Years of Rice and Salt 2002 counterfactual novel

== Astronomy ==
- Kàng (亢) or Neck, a Chinese constellation
- Kang, the star Kappa Virginis

== Other uses ==
- Kang bed-stove
- K'ang jo fu or the kang, a self-defense technique
- KANG-LD, a TV station, San Angelo, Texas, US
- KEUS-LD, a TV station, San Angelo, Texas, US, formerly KANG-CA
- KANG-TV, a TV station in Waco, Texas, US
- Android Open Kang Project, a smartphone operating system
