= Kang (Chinese surname) =

Kang (康, pinyin: Kāng) is a Chinese surname. It is the 88th name on the Hundred Family Surnames poem.

- Kang Senghui (died 280), Buddhist monk of Sogdian origin
- Kang Youwei (1858–1927), reformist political figure from the late Qing dynasty
- Kang Tongbi (1887–1969), social activist from the early Republic of China period, Kang Youwei's daughter
- Kang Sheng (1898–1975), high-ranking official in the People's Republic of China
- Kang Keqing (1911–1992), politician, wife of Zhu De
- Kang Laiyi (1936–2019), epidemiologist
- Kang Hui (born 1972), news anchor
- Kang Ching-jung (康晋榮), or commonly known as Kang Kang (康康), is a Taiwanese entertainer and singer
- Kang Jingwei (康敬伟, Jeffrey Kang, born 1970), Chinese billionaire entrepreneur, founder and CEO of Cogobuy Group

== See also ==
- Kang (disambiguation)
- Kang (Korean surname), written 姜
- Jiang (surname)
  - Jiāng (surname 江) sometimes Romanized "Kang"
  - Jiāng (surname 姜) sometimes Romanized "Kang"
