= Ugar =

Ugar may refer to:

- Ugar Khurd, town in the state of Karnataka, India
- Ugar Budruk, village in the state of Karnataka, India
- Ugar (river), Bosnia and Herzegovina
- Ugar Island, census locality in the Torres Strait, Queensland, Australia
  - Stephen Island (Torres Strait) or Ugar, Queensland, Australia
