= Jhojhu Khurd =

Coordinates: 28°31′N 76°08′E

- village
- Interactive map of Jhojhu Khurd
- Country: India
- State: Haryana
- District: [Charkhi Dadri]

Government
  - Body: Panchayat Manoj Sangwan

Languages
  - Official: Hindi
- Time zone: UTC+5:30 (IST)
- ISO 3166 code: IN-HR
- Vehicle registration: HR-19
- Coastline: 0 kilometres (0 mi)
- Nearest city: Charkhi Dadari
- Lok Sabha constituency: Bhiwani
- Civic agency: Panchayat
- Website: haryana.gov.in

Jhojhu Khurd is a village in the Bhiwani district of the Indian state of Haryana. Khurd and Kalan are Persian language words that mean small and large, respectively. When two villages have the same name then it is distinguished as Kalan or Khurd. The main village is sangwan gotra separate from Jhojhu Kalan some 5 kilometres (3.1 mi) away on the Dadri-Satnali road.For political representational purposes the village is part of Badhra Assembly constituency and the Bhiwani-Mahendragarh Lok Sabha constituency.

The sarpanch is Manoj Kumar A.k.A (Billu).
