= Kanj =

Kanj or KANJ may refer to:

- KANJ (FM), a radio station (91.1 FM) in Giddings, Texas, United States
- Kanj, Iran, a village in Kerman Province, Iran
- Sault Ste. Marie Municipal Airport (Sanderson Field) in Sault Ste. Marie, Michigan, United States by ICAO code
