= Dhabi Kalan =

- Village
- Location of Dhabi Kalan in Haryana Dhabi Kalan (India)
- Coordinates: 29°19′44″N 75°19′29″E
- Country: India
- State: Haryana
- Division: Hisar
- District: Fatehabad
- Mandal: Bhattu Kalan

Government
  - Type: Local government
  - Body: Panchayat
- Time zone: UTC+05:30 (IST)
- ISO 3166 code: IN-HR
- Literacy: 71.4% (17th)
- Official language: Hindi
- Website: haryana.gov.in

Dhabi Kalan is a village in the Bhattu Kalan block, Fatehabad District, Hisar Division in Haryana, India.Khurd is a Persian language word which means "small". Dhabi Kalan is located 7 km from its Mandal main town Bhattu Kalan and 25 km from the district headquarter Fatehabad. The Distance to Hisar is 55 km. The distance to State capital Chandigarh is 260 km. The village is situated 230 km from the national capital New Delhi.

== Economy ==
The economy of this village depends mainly on agriculture. Dairy products are an additional source of income.

Cotton, 2010

Buffalo, 2010

Peanuts, 2010

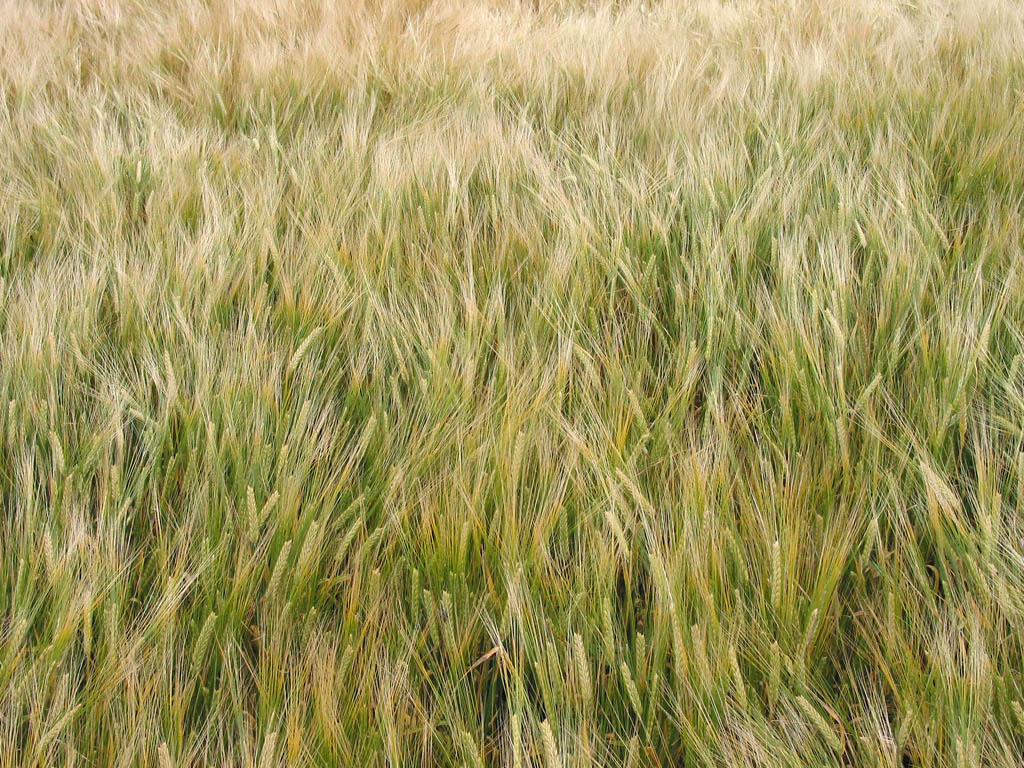
Wheat 2016

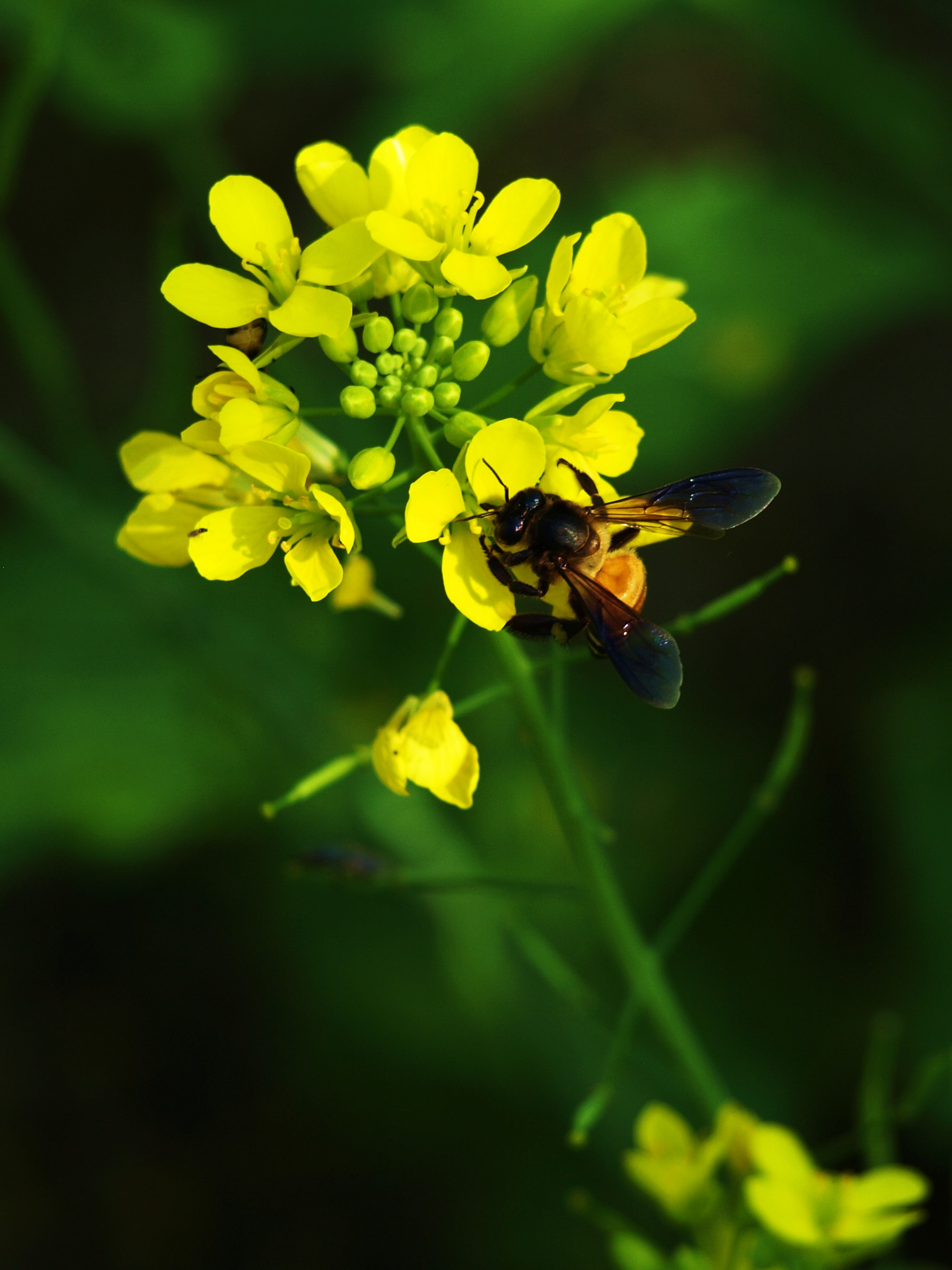
Sarson or Mustard 2016

== Culture ==
The majority of the population are Hindus (~95%), and ca. 5% are Muslims. Haryanvi, Bagri and Hindi are spoken languages in Dhabi Kalan.

== Education ==
Dhabi Kalan has one government school and a few private ones, but most people prefer educational institutions in Bhattu Mandi or Fatehabad as they are easily accessible.

== Population ==
The Dhabi Kalan village has population of 4617 of which 2422 are males while 2195 are females as per Population Census 2011.

== See also ==
- List of villages in Fatehabad district
