= Jandwala Bagar =

- village
- Location in Haryana, India Jandwala Bagar (India)
- Coordinates: 28°30′15″N 76°06′55″E
- Country: India
- State: Haryana
- District: Fatehabad district
- Founder: Bhadu Family

Population (2005)
  - Total: 8,000

Languages
  - Official: Hindi
- Time zone: UTC+5:30 (IST)
- PIN: 125053
- Telephone code: 012502-
- Vehicle registration: HR 21
- Nearest city: Bhattu Kalan
- Literacy: 95%%
- Lok Sabha constituency: Fatehbad
- Vidhan Sabha constituency: Hisar
- Website: haryana.gov.in

Jandwala Bagar, or Jandwala is a village in Bhattu Kalan tehsil in the Fatehabad district of Haryana, India. The local language is Hindi.

== Infrastructure ==
In February 2013 Fatehabad Deputy Commissioner Saket Kumar visited several villages, including Jandwala Bagar, to inspect and discuss aspects of their infrastructure, such as development.

== Agriculture ==
In a September 2004 visit to Jandwala Bagar, Haryana Chief Minister Om Prakash Chautala asked villagers about their general welfare and about the state of their cattle and crops.

== Schools ==
There are two schools in the village: a primary school that teaches up to the fifth grade, and a secondary school for up to the twelfth grade.

== See also ==
- List of villages in Fatehabad district
