= Birot Kalan =

- Country: Pakistan
- Province: Khyber Pakhtunkhwa
- District: Abbottabad
- Tehsil: Abbottabad
- Union Council: Birot Kalan

Population (2017)
  - Total: 14,764

Birot Kalan is an area of Birot Kalan Union Council, Abbottabad Tehsil, Abbottabad District, Khyber Pakhtunkhwa, Pakistan. According to the 2017 Census of Pakistan, the population of Birot Kalan is 14,764.
