= Ghoti (disambiguation) =

Ghoti is a creative respelling of the word fish.

Ghoti may also refer to:

- Ghoti people, a social group native to West Bengal, India
- Ghoti Budruk, a census town in Nashik district in Maharashtra state, India
- Ghoti Khurd, a small village in Maharashtra state, India
- Ghoti Hook, a former Christian punk band from Fairfax, Virginia, United States

== See also ==
- Ghotki (disambiguation)
- Goahti
