= Hivare =

Village in Maharashtra, India

Hivare हिवरे
- Village
- Location in Maharashtra, India
- Coordinates: 17.8189°N 74.1974°E
- Country: India
- State: Maharashtra
- District: Satara
- Taluka: Koregaon
- Time zone: UTC+5:30 (IST)
- PIN: 415501
- Vehicle registration: MH-11

Hivare is a village in Koregaon taluka of Satara district, Maharashtra, India. It is located approximately 24 km from Koregaon and 29 km from Satara. The village spans 878 hectares and had a population of 1,378 people across 303 households, according to the 2011 Census of India.

== Demographics ==
As per the 2011 Census, the population included 648 males and 730 females, giving a sex ratio of 1,127 females per 1,000 males, above the state average of 929. Children aged 0–6 years accounted for 11.39% of the population, with a child sex ratio of 847, below the state average of 894. The overall literacy rate was 77.64%, with male literacy at 87.03% and female literacy at 69.6%.

== Administration ==
The village is governed by a Gram Panchayat led by an elected Sarpanch. Hivare falls under the Koregaon Assembly constituency and the Satara (Lok Sabha constituency).

== Economy ==
Most of the village's population is engaged in agriculture and related activities. According to the 2011 Census, 79.61% of workers were involved in main work (more than six months per year), while 20.39% were engaged in marginal work (less than six months annually).

== Forest management ==
In 2014, Hivare was granted rights to manage approximately 216.9 hectares of forest under the Maharashtra Village Forest Rules. It was one of two villages in Koregaon taluka to receive such recognition.

== Water management ==
The village has constructed 33 deep continuous contour trenches as part of a water conservation initiative supported by local participation and government programs. These trenches, along with a series of stream-fed dams, aim to improve water percolation and groundwater levels. Estimates indicate a goal of 80 million liters of water recharge annually.

Officials including the District Collector and Zilla Parishad CEO visited the village during the implementation of the project. The Paani Foundation later conducted field visits to study the outcomes.

The water management efforts reportedly led to:

- A second cropping cycle due to improved water availability
- Higher sugarcane productivity
- Increased daily milk production (from 60 to 150 liters)
- Reduction in seasonal migration

== Gallery ==
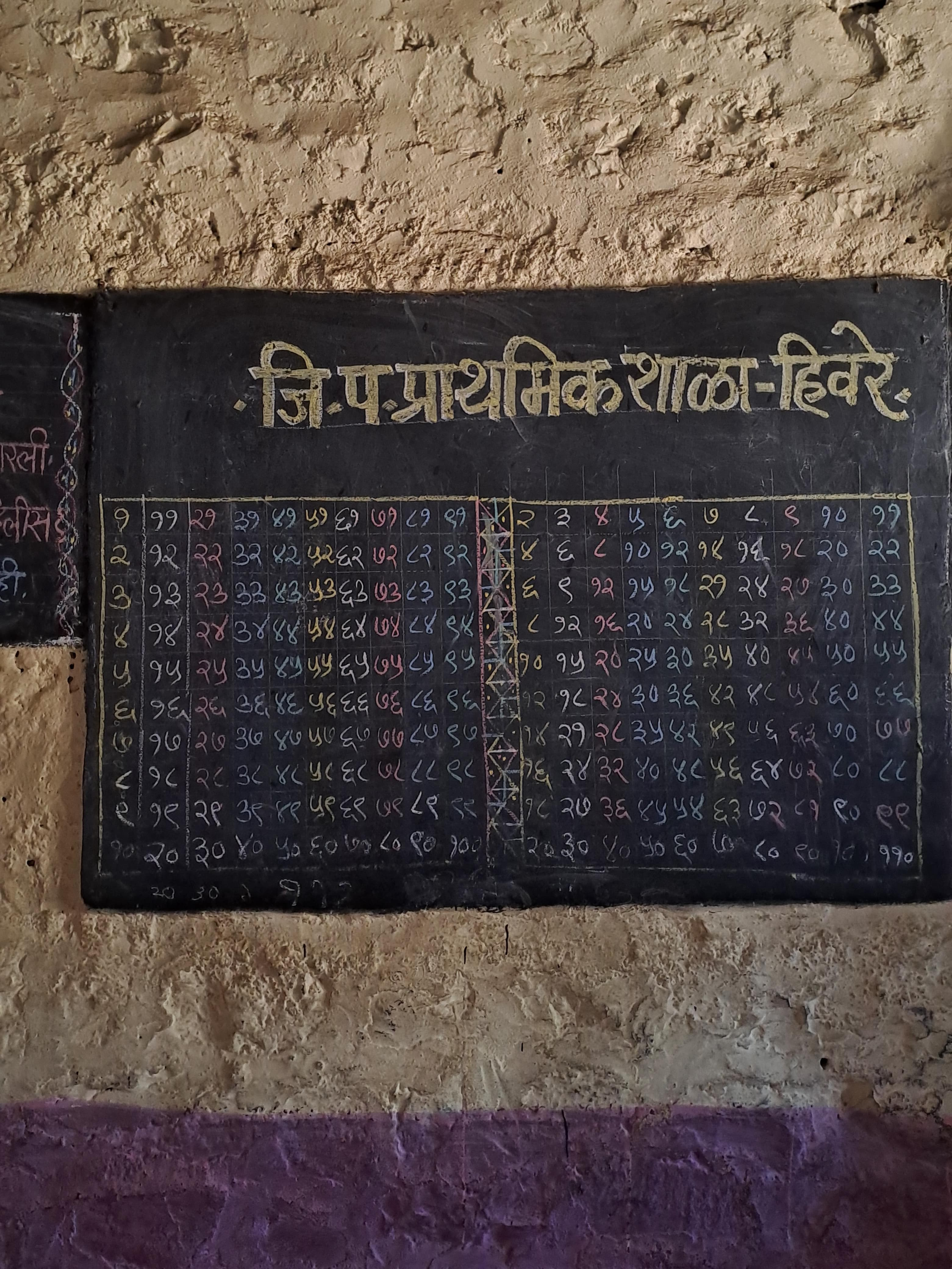
ZP Secondary School

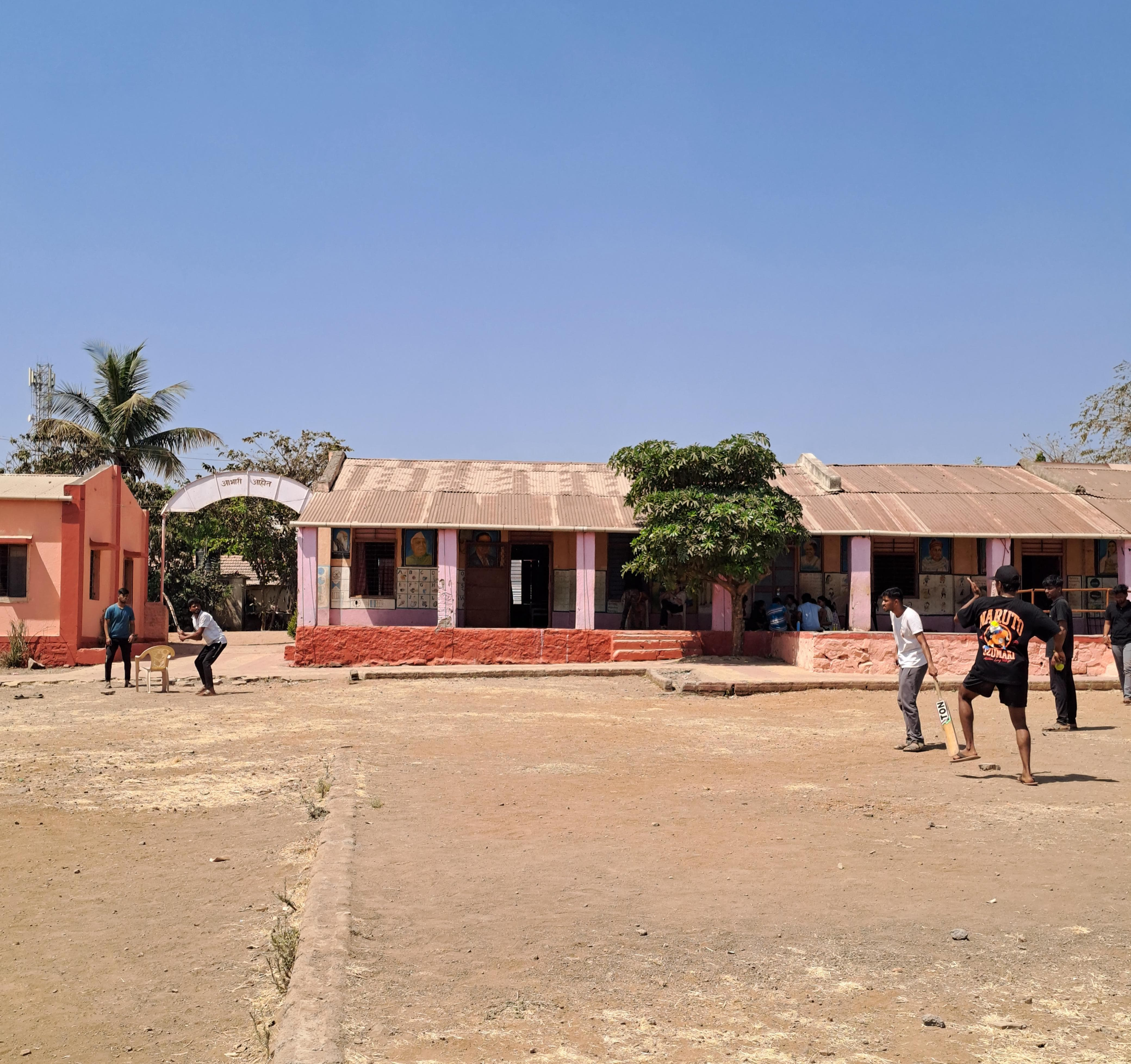
ZP Secondary School

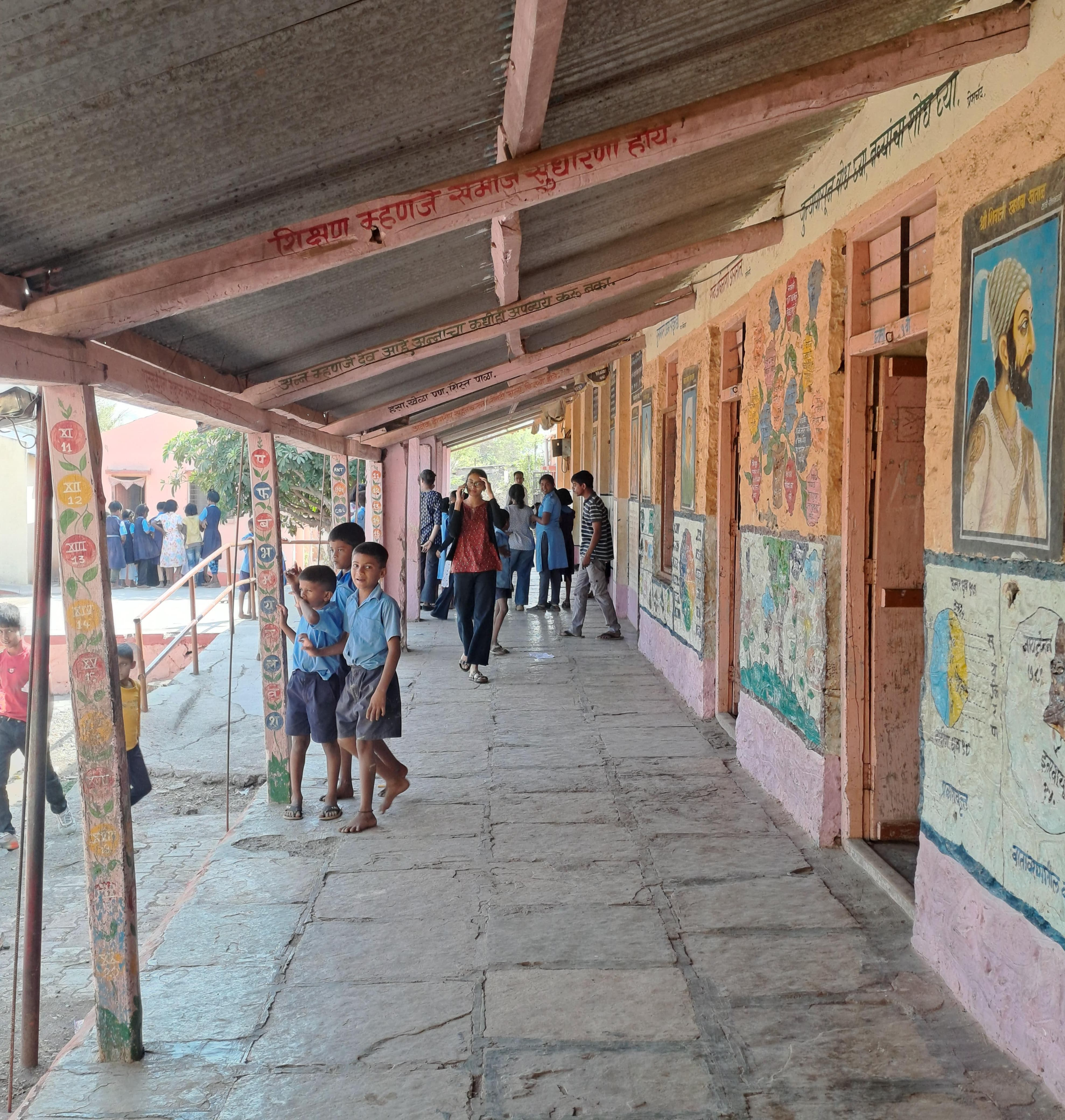
ZP Secondary School

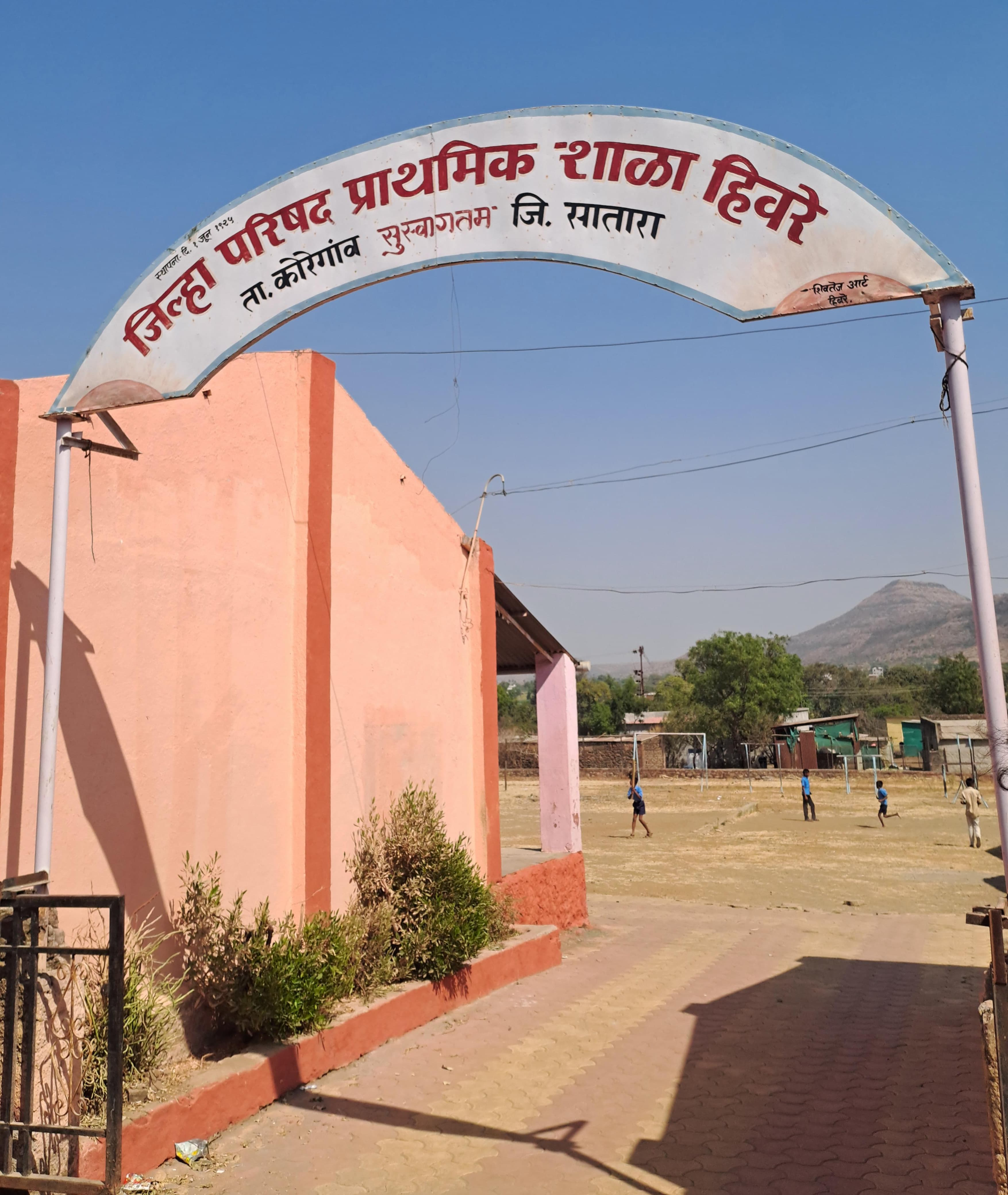
ZP Secondary School

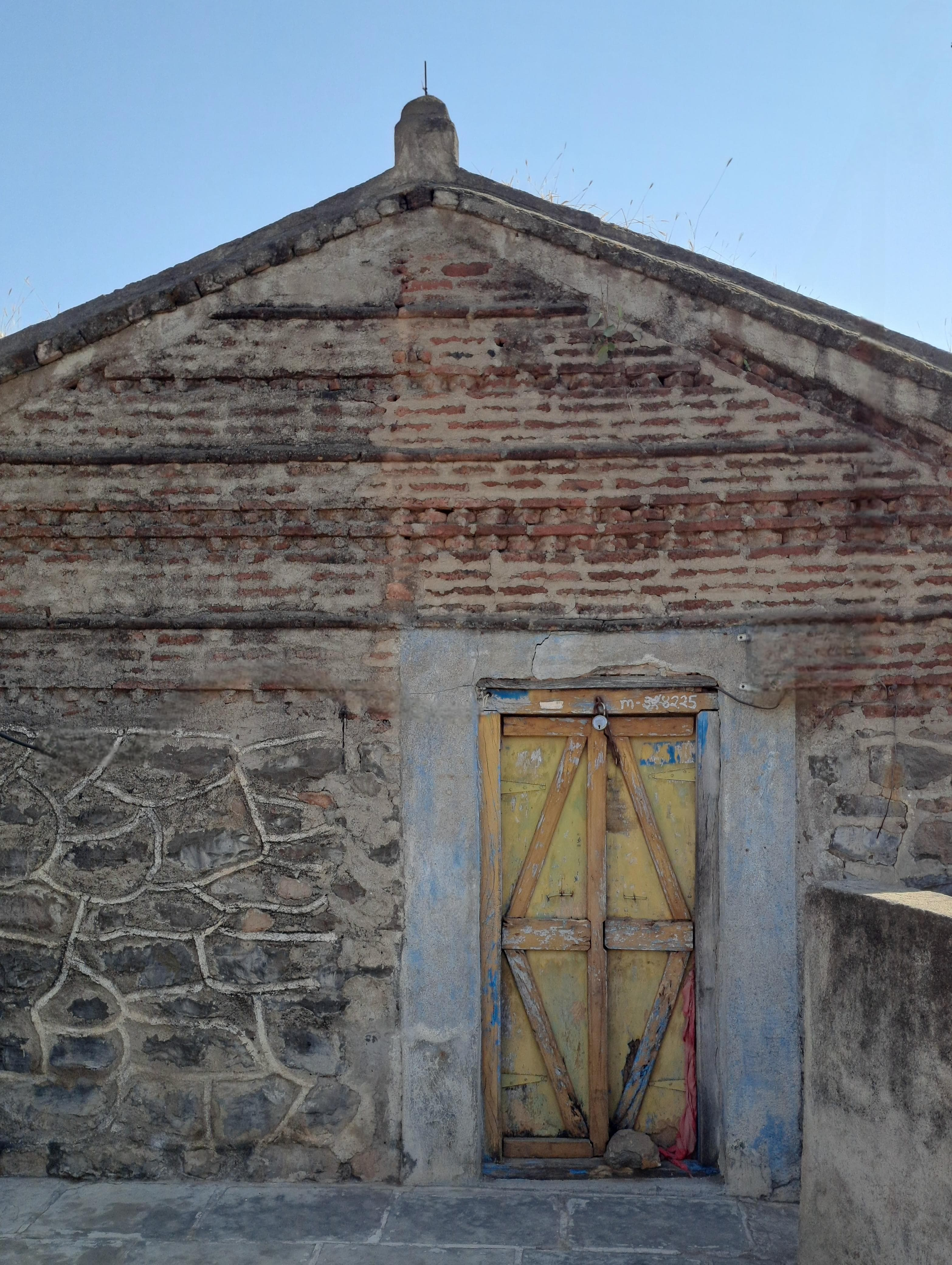
Village Aesthetics

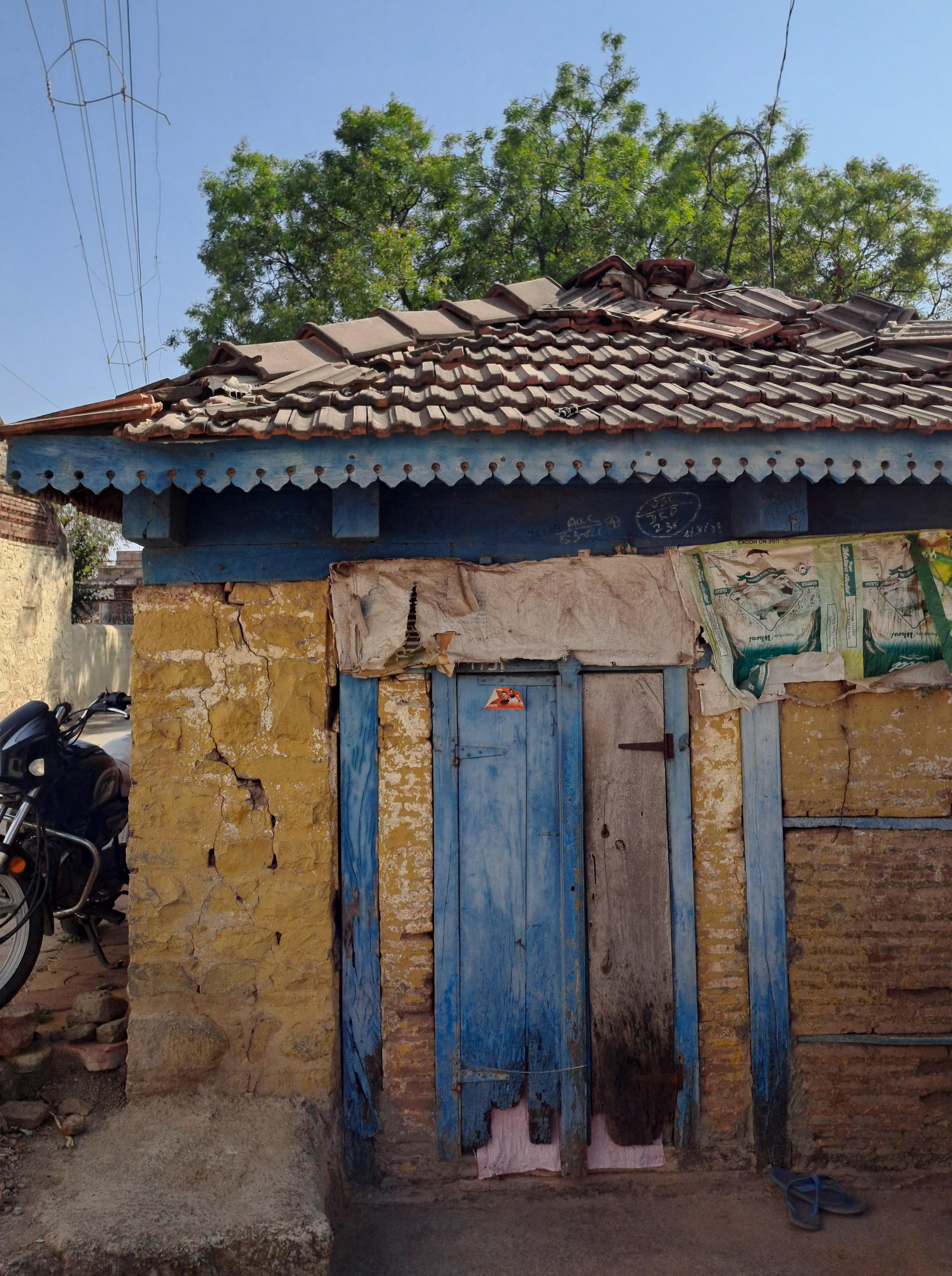
Village Aesthetics

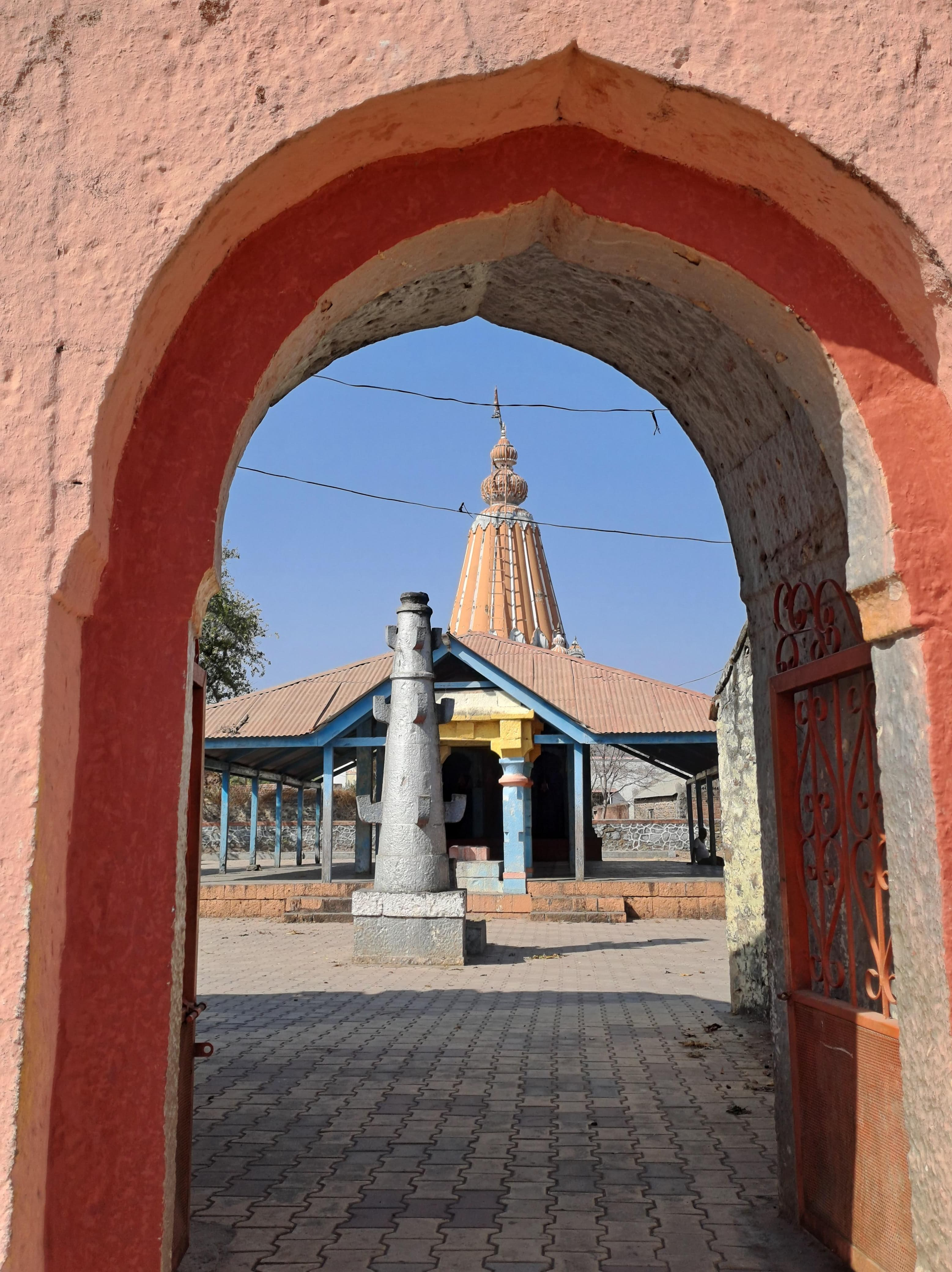
Temple
