= Dangoh Khurd =

- village
- Location in Himachal Pradesh, India Dangoh Khurd (India)
- Coordinates: 31.788°N 75.994°E
- Country: India
- State: Himachal Pradesh
- District: Una

Government
  - Type: Panchayati raj (India)
  - Body: Gram panchayat

Languages
  - Official: Hindi
- Time zone: UTC+5:30 (IST)
- PIN: 177204
- Telephone code: 91-1976
- Vehicle registration: HP-20
- Amit Sharma Kalish Nagar ( Nakroh )

Dangoh Khurd is a small village in Una District of Himachal Pradesh, India.

It lies approx 4 km from Daulatpur Chownk on Una Talwara Road, 12 km from Mubarakpur and falls under Tehsil Ghanari of Una District. The village has produced many officers who have served Government of India & Government of Himachal Pradesh. The village is approx. 50 km from the Nangal side of the state of Punjab in India. The village has plain lands on one side, mountains on other side and has a rivulet flowing through it.

== Etymology ==
The Hindi locution Khurd and Kalan derives from the Persian language, which means "small and big" respectively; when two villages have the same name, they are distinguished as Kalan (big) and Khurd (small).

== Location ==
Vill Pirthipur is approx 2 km from Daulatpur Chowk

== Population data ==
The village has approximately 61 households containing 302 persons as per Census of India. The village has sizeable population of Dogra Brahmins. The village has a Zila Panchyat.

== Schools ==
Daulatpur Near Dangoh Khurd has DAV High School recognised by Himachal Pradesh Education Board. The Village has a nearby Govt High School at Daulat Pur Chowk also.

== Economy and general facts ==
The land is predominantly agricultural in nature. The main crops are wheat, rice, maize and in some areas medicinal plants are being grown. The India Post Pin Code of the village is 177204. The famous Chintpurni Temple is approx 16 km from the village. Indian Railways have plans to link this village with District Headquarters of Una through Chandigarh.
