= Asan Khurd =

Assan Khurd
- township
- Location in Haryana, India Assan Khurd (India)
- Coordinates: 29.40404°N 76.86997°E
- Country: India
- State: Haryana
- District: Panipat

Population (2011)
  - Total: 1,000

Languages
  - Official: Hindi
- Time zone: UTC+5:30 (IST)
- ISO 3166 code: IN-HR
- Vehicle registration: HR

Assan Khurd is a census town in Panipat district of Haryana, India. Khurd and Kalan are Persian language words which mean small and big respectively. When two villages have the same name then it is distinguished as Kalan or Khurd with the village name.

== Demographics ==
As of 2001 India census, Assan Khurd had a population of 8064. Males constitute 55% of the population and females 45%. Assan Khurd has an average literacy rate of 82%, higher than the national average of 59.5%; with 59% of the males and 41% of females literate. 9% of the population is under 6 years of age. The new sarpanch of Assan Khurd is Smt. Neelam Tanwar w/o Mr. Veer Singh Tanwar elected on 17 January 2016.

== Schools ==
Govt. Primary School, Asan Khurd

Govt. Sr. Sec. School, Assan Kalan
