= Rure Ke Kalan =

Rure Ke Kalan Rureke Kalan
- village
- Country: India
- State: Punjab
- District: Barnala district
- Talukas: Tapa

Government
  - Body: Nagar Panchayat, Rure Ke Kalan

Languages
  - Official: Punjabi
- Time zone: UTC+5:30 (IST)
- PIN: 148107
- Telephone code: 1679
- Vehicle registration: PB-19
- Nearest city: Tapa
- Lok Sabha constituency: Bhaudar
- Vidhan Sabha constituency: bhaudar
- Civic agency: Nagar Panchayat, Rure Ke Kalan

Rure Ke Kalan or Rureke Kalan, is a small village with a population of about 5000 people located in Punjab, India. Khurd and Kalan are Persian language words which means small and big respectively. When two villages have the same name then they are at times distinguished by adding as Kalan or Khurd to the village name.

The village is situated on the Barnala-to-Mansa Road, approximately 17 km from Barnala. It lies within the Tapa subdivision of Barnala district in Punjab. Rure-Ke-Kalan has a st Xavier school, with kerala staff, one high school, two private model schools, one primary health dispensary, one veterinary dispensary, a post office and numerous business shops.
