= Berwala Khurd =

Coordinates: 29°27′N 74°34′E

Berwala Khurd is a village in Ellenabad Tehsil of Sirsa district, Haryana, India. "Khurd" and "Kalan" are Persian language words which mean "small" and "big" respectively. When two villages have the same name, they can be distinguished as "Kalan", meaning "Big", and "Khurd", meaning "Small", with the village name. Berwala Khurd is about 9 km (5.6 mi) west of Ellenabad and 53 km (33 mi) west of the district headquarters Sirsa. Berwala Khurd is in the western corner of Sirsa district and is on the border that touches Rajasthan. It has no public transit to connect it with the nearby town (Ellenabad). People mainly rely upon motor bikes, cars and tractors. Berwala Khurd has 4,000 bigha of agricultural land. The population is approximately 4,500 people. In the village there is the Sahid Radhey Shyam Bhaker government senior secondary school. Nearby villages are Dhaulpalia (south), Talwara Khurd (northeast), and Berwala Kalan (north, in Rajasthan).

The Indira Gandhi Canal runs 4.0 km (2.5 mi) west of the village. In the village there are two wells. These are not used now but old people of village used to tell that these wells had a great role for establishing this village. As for establishing village there were few rules/criteria and one out of them was availability of drinking water. When Berwala Khurd got established at that time in village there was no drinkable water source so to fulfill this drinkable water criteria 2 well has been dug and leather bag full of imported drinking water has been hanged in well to clear drinking water criteria. Before approving establishment of village officer came to check drinking water and people of village had put bucket in well but it was put originally in leather bag full of drinking water. Officer tasted water and allowed or approved establishment of the village.

== Population ==
The village consists of mix communities. It has SC, OBC, and General category people. Most of them are illiterate. The village's economy is mainly consists of agriculture and animal husbandry. People spend their time by watching TV and playing card with neighbours.

Village having post office serves Berwala Khurd and Dhaulpalia. Village having water works, old age home, panchayat home, Aaangan wadi & Gaushala also.

Villagers mainly do agriculture and related work. Village get water from Bhakra canal and indra gandhi Canal.

Average Sex Ratio of Berwala Khurd is 941 which is higher than Haryana state average of 879. Child Sex Ratio for the Berwala Khurd as per 2011 census is 966, higher than Haryana average of 834.

== Education ==
Berwala Khurd village has lower literacy rate compared to Haryana. In 2011, literacy rate of Berwala Khurd was 69.27% compared to 75.55% of Haryana. In Berwala Khurd male literacy stands at 80.57% while female literacy rate was 57.24%.

As per constitution of India and Panchyati Raaj Act, Berwala Khurd village is administrated by Sarpanch (Head of Village) who is elected representative of village.

Sahid Radhey Shyam Bhaker is Sahid army man. He was martyr in Jammu Kashmir at Kupwara Sector during kargil war. Every year villagers celebrate his martyr day on 17 December.
