= Barkachha Khurd =

Village in Uttar Pradesh, India

Coordinates: 25°05′N 82°35′E

Barkachha Khurd is a village in Mirzapur, Uttar Pradesh, India. Khurd and Kalan are Persian language words which mean small and big respectively. When two villages have the same name they are distinguished by adding Kalan or Khurd with the village name based on their relative size.
