= Aujla Khurd =

Ojla Khurd
- Village
- Location within Pakistan
- Coordinates: 32°20′12″N 74°09′24″E
- Country: Pakistan
- Province: Punjab
- District: Gujranwala
- Time zone: UTC+5 (PST)

Aujla Khurd (Punjabi: "اوجلہ خورد") is a village situated in Gujranwala District, Punjab province in Pakistan, located at geographical coordinates 32°20′20″N 74°9′30″E. Khurds and Kalan are Persian language words that mean small and big, respectively. When two villages in the same area have the same name, then, depending on their size, they are distinguished by adding the words Kalan (big) and Khurd (small) at the end of the village name.
