= Malava Khurd =

Village in Uttar Pradesh, India

Malava Khurd is a village in Prayagraj, Uttar Pradesh, India.Khurd and Kalan are Persian language words which mean small and big respectively when two villages have the same name then they are distinguished as Kalan (big) and Khurd (small) at the end of the village name, with reference to their size relative to each other.
