= Kaserua Khurd =

Village in Uttar Pradesh, India

Kaserua Khurd is a village in Prayagraj, Uttar Pradesh, India. Khurd and Kalan are Persian language words, which mean small and big, respectively. When two villages have the same name then they are distinguished by adding Kalan (big) and Khurd (small) at the end of the village name, having reference to their size relative to each other.
