= Berote Khurd =

Subdivision of Birote Kalan in Pakistan

Birote Khurd is a subdivision of Berote Kalan Union Council in Abbottabad District of Khyber Pakhtunkhwa province, Pakistan. It had previously been a separate Union Council.

== History ==
As part of the local government reforms of 2000, Birote Khurd lost the status of Union Council and was merged into Birote Kalan.

== Etymology ==
The name "Berote Khurd" means lesser Berote, differentiating it from the larger settlement of "Berote Kalan". The words Khurd and Kalan (little and big) are administrative terminology dating back to Mughal times – to differentiate two areas with the same name based on their size relative to each other, hence Birote Khurd means little Birote (cf. Britannia major, "Greater Britain" and Britannia minor "Lesser Britain").

== Geography ==
Birote Khurd is located in the eastern part of Abbottabad District in the Khyber Pakhtunkhwa Province. To the east is the Birote Kallan and Kashmir region and in the west Nathiagalli areas, to the south is Pluck and to the north is the Bakot area. Birote Khurd lies in the foothills of famous Mushkpuri peaks of the Galyat Region.

== Demographics ==
It has a population of 15000. The main tribe of Birote Khurd are the, Mojwal, Nakodraal, khanall and seechwal(a sub tribe of the Dhond Abbasi). Others tribes are Gujjars Pathans and Qureshis.

== Main settlements ==
The main wards of Berote, Khurd are (with notable residents):

- Nakkar Kutbal -( کوہ غربی) Imtiaz Abbasi of imtiaz supper store
- Lahoor - کوہ غربی

Jan Mohammad Abbasi, Taj Abbasi, Fazal Kareem Saheb ( Teacher)

- Mohra - کوہ غربی

Qazi Sajawal Abbasi, Azan Abbasi, Fazal Raheem Abbasi, Sarwar Abbasi. Adil Khalid Abbasi, a youth leader from this village, is gaining prominence within the ranks of various political parties. Known for his dedication to political activism and community welfare, Abbasi has garnered support among the youth. His efforts in addressing local issues and promoting youth engagement in politics have earned him their respect and recognition. As his influence continues to grow, he is increasingly seen as a promising figure in the future of regional politics.

- Nakar Mojwal -

Wajid Isamdad Abbasi, Mohammad Afraz Abbasi, Ziab Abbasi, Sufi Qurban Abbasi, Isamdad Abbasi Merhoom and Asif abbasi.

- Rialy

A PMLN leader come name Farooq Rialy comes from this village who is winning chairman of VC Birote Khurd since 3 Years as of Local election of 2022. first retired SDO of NLC from circle Bakot Mr Engr Haji Usman Abbasi was also coming from this village. Further to above Gul Zareen Abbasi, Shaid Abbasi, Mushtaq Hussain, Saeed Hussain Ahmed Ali Usmani, Umer Farooq Abbasi, Saqib Ehsan Abbasi, Farooq Abbasi, Kashif Farooq, Mubashir Usman, Hammad Farooq, Aquib Ehsan, Danish Usman, Aamir Farooq, Hanan Umer Abbasi, Waqas Qudoos and Arshad Bashir also coming from this village.

- Abbasi town Battala-

Musa khan Abbasi, Mubarak Abbasi, Ghazanfar Abbasi, Ajaz Abbasi(university of karachi), Shabran Abbasi, Jabran Abbasi, Mudassar Abbasi, Mazar Abbasi, shahzad Abbasi, Arslan Abbasi, Farhan Abbasi, Imran Abbasi,

- Hotrari/Hotrary -
- Mawan Di Hill
- Soi Nakheter -
- Moor-
- Poora -
- Sangrerhi - Mazhar Ishaq Abbasi
- SEERGOH :
- Cholooty;
- Haroota;
- Toopa-

Haqeeq abbasi and Gulkhan

- Nari Hoter - M.Rouf Abbasi, Sadaqat Abbasi, Hafeez Abbasi, Amjad Abbasi, Atif Abbasi, Naveed Abbasi, Khuzama Abbasi, Samar Abbasi
- Hotrol - Raheem dad Abbasi and Shahbaz abbasi
- Bhan - Muhammad Nawaz Abbasi, Taj abbasi, Dr Haq Nawaz Abbasi (University Professor and Environmentalist)
- Khrindi -
- Kali Kandal -

== Transport ==
The Qazi Sajawal road from Basian/Abbasian Hotrari Chowk to BHU Mohra road (7-km) connects Swargali- Boi highway (a junction on the main Abbottabad-Murree Road), and the Hadhrat Molana Pir Fakir-u-llah Bakoti Road from Bakot provide transportation links to Birote Khurd. Peer Azhar Bakoti road connects Hotrati Chowk to Bakote Via Hotrari, Hotrol, Bhan. Mumtaz Abbasi connects Hotrari to Moori via Mawan Di Hill.

A lift from Hotrari Chowk to Hotrari opened in 2004 stretching 2,200 ft (670 m). Another cable car connects Birote Klan to Nakker Qutbal and then Nakker Qutbal to Mohra (Lammi joo). This cable car crosses Knair and Kasss streams.

== History ==
This area was a market for Birote Khurd people in winter in the 20th century, but this tradition died out. Water mills vanished during the 1970s, from Gandran ni Dheri, lower Naker Qutbal.
