= Kahoo Sharqi =

- Country: Pakistan
- Province: Khyber Pakhtunkhwa
- District: Abbottabad
- Tehsil: Abbottabad
- Union Council: Birot Kalan

Population (2017)
  - Total: 6,337

Karoo Sharqi is an area of Birot Kalan Union Council, Abbottabad Tehsil, Abbottabad District, Khyber Pakhtunkhwa, Pakistan. According to the 2017 Census of Pakistan, the population of Karoo Sharqi is 60,337.
