= Khinger Khurd =

Coordinates: 33°25′22″N 73°07′31″E

- Village
- Location within Pakistan
- Country: Pakistan
- Province: Punjab
- District: Rawalpindi
- Time zone: UTC+5 (PST)

Khingar Khurd (Khurd: ) is a small village located in Rawalpindi Tehsil of Rawalpindi District in the Pothohar region of Pakistan. The village is located in NA 52 Pakistan. The total population is round about 1200 persons. Khingar tribe is a sub-caste of Bhatti Rajput. Khurd and Kalan are Persian language words which mean small and big respectively. When two villages have the same name, they are distinguished by adding either Kalan (big) and Khurd (small) at the end of the village name, based on their size relative to each other.

Khinger Khurd is about 34 km to the southwest of Rawalpindi in the Punjab province of Pakistan.Khinger Khurd is located in the Union Council of Jhatta Hathial (UC-115). It is located on the right side of Chak Beli Khan Road when going to Chak Beli Khan, Katarian village is adjacent to village Khinger Khurd. The neighbouring villages are Dudian, Piyal, Mohra Phaphra, Jhatta Hathyal. All residents of the village are Muslim.
