= Mehra (village) =

Village in Charkhi Dadri, Haryana, India

Mehra मैहड़ा Mahra or Mehera
- Village
- Motto: Jai Dada Dohla
- Location in Haryana, India
- Coordinates: 28°33′49.7″N 76°09′17.8″E
- Country: India
- State: Haryana
- District: Charkhi Dadri
- Tehsil: Charkhi Dadri
- Block: Jhojhu Kalan

Government
  - Type: Gram Panchayat
  - Sarpanch: Vikash Singh

Area
  - Total: 7 km^{2} (2.7 sq mi)
- Elevation: 230 m (750 ft)
- Highest elevation: 300 m (980 ft)
- Lowest elevation: 228 m (748 ft)

Population (2025)
  - Total: 4,500
- (est.; 1,926 voters)
- Demonym: Mehriya
- Time zone: UTC+5.30 (Indian Standard Time)
- Postal Code: 127026
- Area code: 01250
- Website: www.haryana.gov.in

MAIN GATE OF GOVERNMENT SCHOOL OF VILLAGE MEHRA, CHAKRHI DADRI, HARYANA

Mehra (pronounced /mɛːɦ.ɽaː/ (Maihṛā); मैहड़ा) is a village in Charkhi Dadri district, Haryana, India. It is part of Jhojhu Kalan Block and falls under Charkhi Dadri Tehsil.

== Geography ==
Mehra is located 15 km from the District Headquarters (Charkhi Dadri) and approximately 3 km from National Highway 334B. The village is situated in a semi-arid region with flat agricultural land and low hills from the Aravalli Range on the eastern side.

== Demographics ==
According to local administrative reports from December 2025, Mehra has an estimated population of approximately 4,500, with 1,926 registered voters. The Jat community forms the majority.

The village is home to a diverse population consisting of various communities and gotras (clans). Some of the prominent clans residing in the village include:

- Nai: Bholan (भोलण)
- Baniya: Goyal (गोयल)
- Jat: Sangwan (सांगवान), Maan (मान), Taxak (तक्षक), Lamba (लाम्बा), Shehrawat (शेहरावत), Grewal (ग्रेवाल), Kinha (कीन्हा)
- Jogi: Ninan (निनाण), Dabla (डाबला)
- Chamar: Chhokar (छोकर), Dahiya (दहिया), Tanwar (तंवर), Badbad (बड़बर)
- Khati: Bijania (बिजनिया)
- Bahman: Kaushik (कौशिक)
- Dhobi: Kayath (कायथ)
- Kumhar: Prajapat (प्रजापत)
- Sikka/Sakka: Tanwar (तंवर)
- Dhanak: Bumra (बुमरा), Nagar (नागर), Khanna (खन्ना), Khatak (खटक)

== Folklore ==
The village is historically significant for the legend of Baba Bandev, a warrior saint. According to local oral tradition, Baba Bandev was a soldier who was decapitated in battle but continued to fight, riding his horse back to Mehra without his head. A shrine (known locally as a Gumbad) marks the specific spot where his torso is believed to have finally fallen. A unique feature of this shrine is that it has no roof; according to village belief, the structure cannot sustain a roof, and it remains open to the sky to this day.

BABA BANDEV MAHARAJ, VILLAGE - MEHRA, CHARKHI DADRI, HARYANA 127026

Additionally, the village honors Dada Dohla Maharaj, an ascetic from Surehti who is said to have arrived around Samvat 1350 (c. 1293 AD) to perform penance on the adjacent hill. The village hosts gatherings on the 'Teras' and 'Chaudas' (13th and 14th days) of the lunar month in his honor.

== Economy ==
Agriculture is the primary occupation. Mehra is noted for its agricultural innovations and claims to be the first village in the district to initiate large-scale tomato cultivation, which became a primary source of economic prosperity for local farmers. Major crops currently include tomato, wheat, mustard, rice, and bajra.

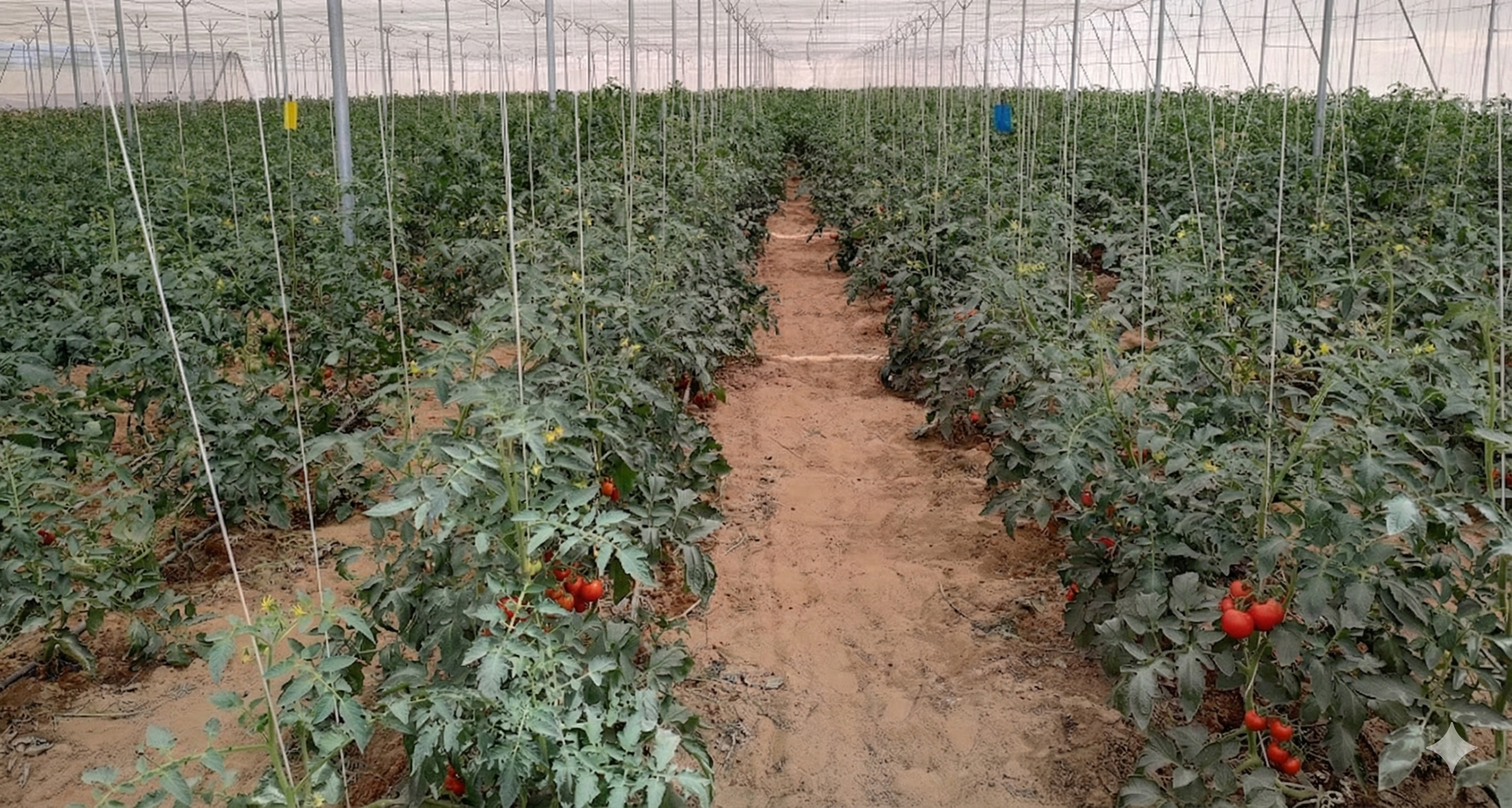
TOMATO PLANTATION IN A NETHOUSE, VILLAGE - MEHRA, CHARKHI DADRI, HARYANA

== Infrastructure ==
The village hosts a major Canal Based Water Works facility managed by the Public Health Engineering Department (PHED), Charkhi Dadri. Constructed under a NABARD scheme, this plant treats and supplies potable water to a group of six villages: Mehra, Tiwala, Sishwala, Ashawari, Badal, and Gudana.

CANAL BASED WATER WORKS, VILLAGE - MEHRA; (GROUP OF 6 VILLAGES), PUBLIC HEALTH ENGINEERING DEPARTMENT CHARKHI DADRI HARYANA

The facility is designed with a supply capacity of 70 Litres Per Capita Per Day (LPCD). The infrastructure includes two large sedimentation tanks with a combined capacity of approximately 14 million litres and two clear water tanks with a capacity of 3.66 lakh litres.

== Administration ==
Mehra falls under the Mehra Gram Panchayat and is governed by the local Sarpanch under the Panchayati Raj system. The village is part of the Badhra Vidhan Sabha constituency and Bhiwani–Mahendragarh Lok Sabha constituency.

== Transport and connectivity ==
Mehra is connected to National Highway 334B and the nearest railway station is Charkhi Dadri railway station (15 km).

== Notable people ==
The village has a strong tradition of military service and sports.

- Rhythm Sangwan – Indian sport shooter who represented India at the 2024 Summer Olympics and won gold in the women's 25m pistol team event at the Asian Games.
- **Surender Mehra** – Advocate and President of Charkhi Dadri Bar Association, elected for the fourth time.
