= Bhikawadi Khurd =

Village in Maharashtra

- village
- Location in Maharashtra, India Bhikawadi Khurd (India)
- Coordinates: 17°20′13″N 74°26′35″E
- Country: India
- State: Maharashtra
- District: Sangli

Government
  - Body: Grampanchayat Bhikawadi Khurd

Population (2011 census)
  - Total: 1,677

Languages
  - Official: Marathi
- Time zone: UTC+5:30 (IST)
- PIN: 415311
- Telephone code: 02347
- Vehicle registration: MH 10
- Nearest city: Vita, Maharashtra
- Literacy: 90%
- Lok Sabha constituency: Sangli
- Vidhan Sabha constituency: Palus-Kadegaon
- Civic agency: Grampanchayat Bhikawadi Khurd

Bhikawadi Khurd is a small village in Sangli district of Maharashtra state (India). Bhikawadi is 14 km from Vita. Bhikawadi is a known for God Shrinath temple and also for Jatra (street festival). Bhikawadi hosts "Jatra" on "Gudhi Padawa" of every year. Khurd and Kalan are Persian words which mean small and big, respectively. When two villages have the same name, they are distinguished by adding these words to the end of their names.

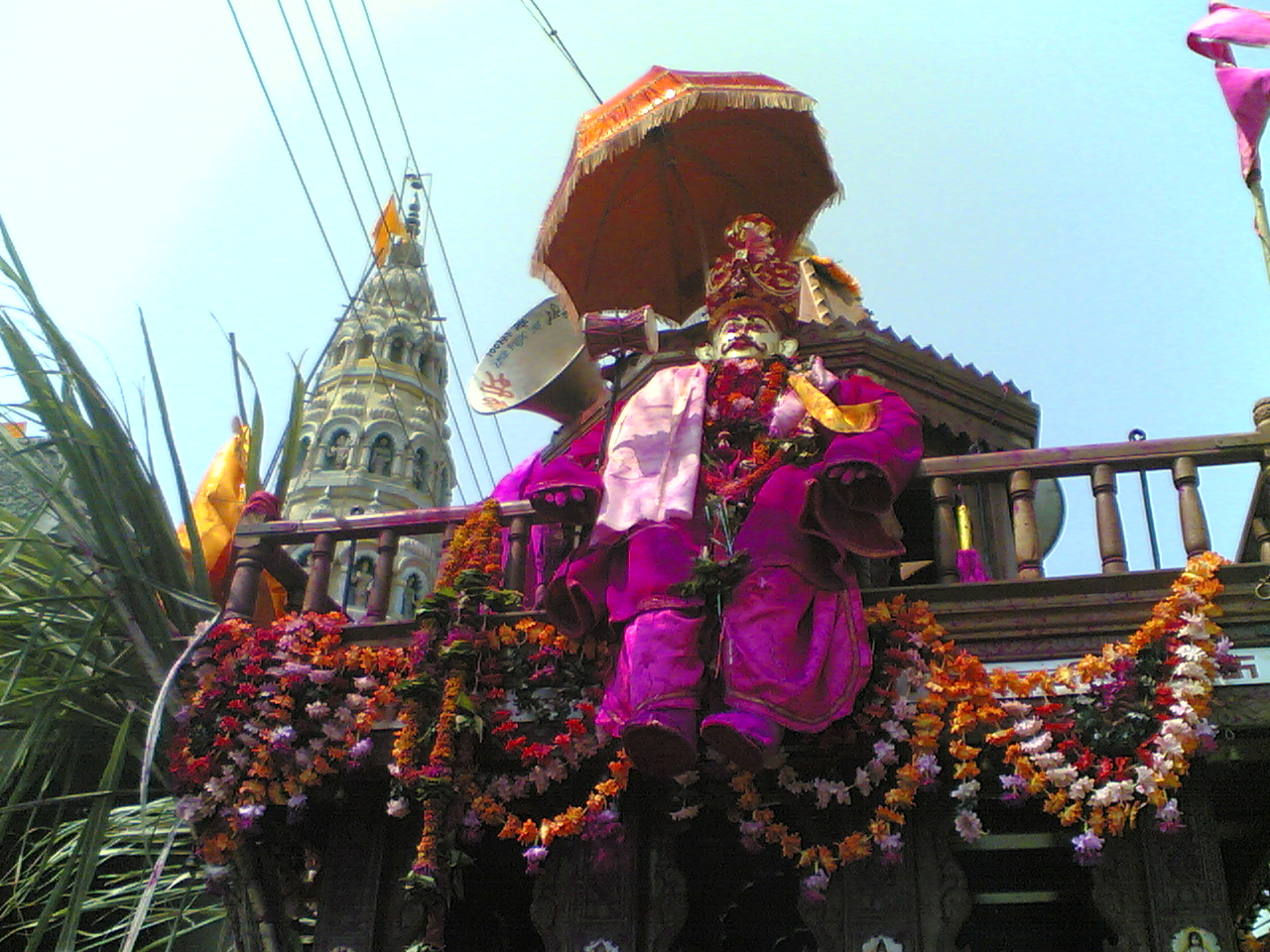
Shrinath Temple and Rath

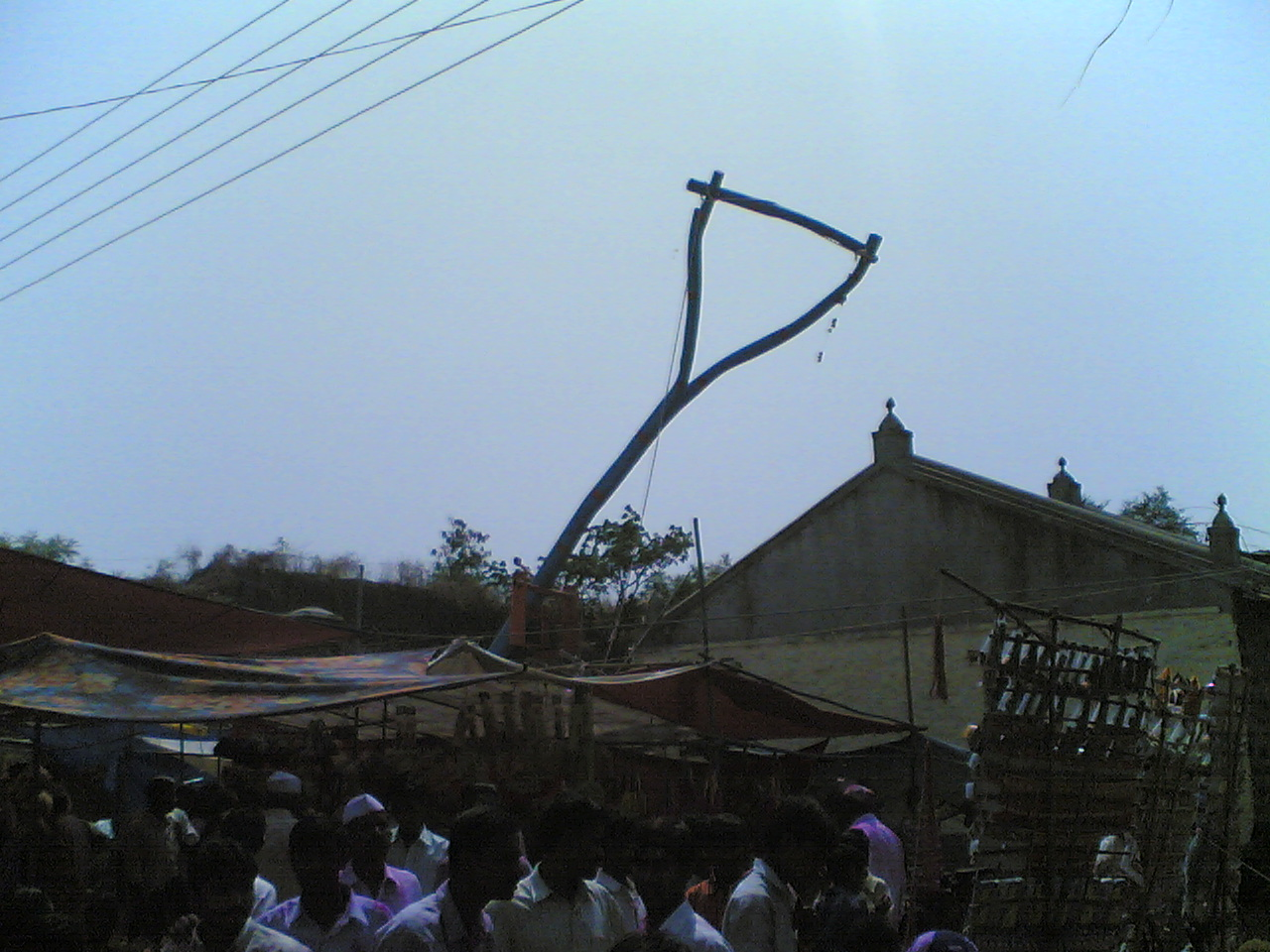
Bagad

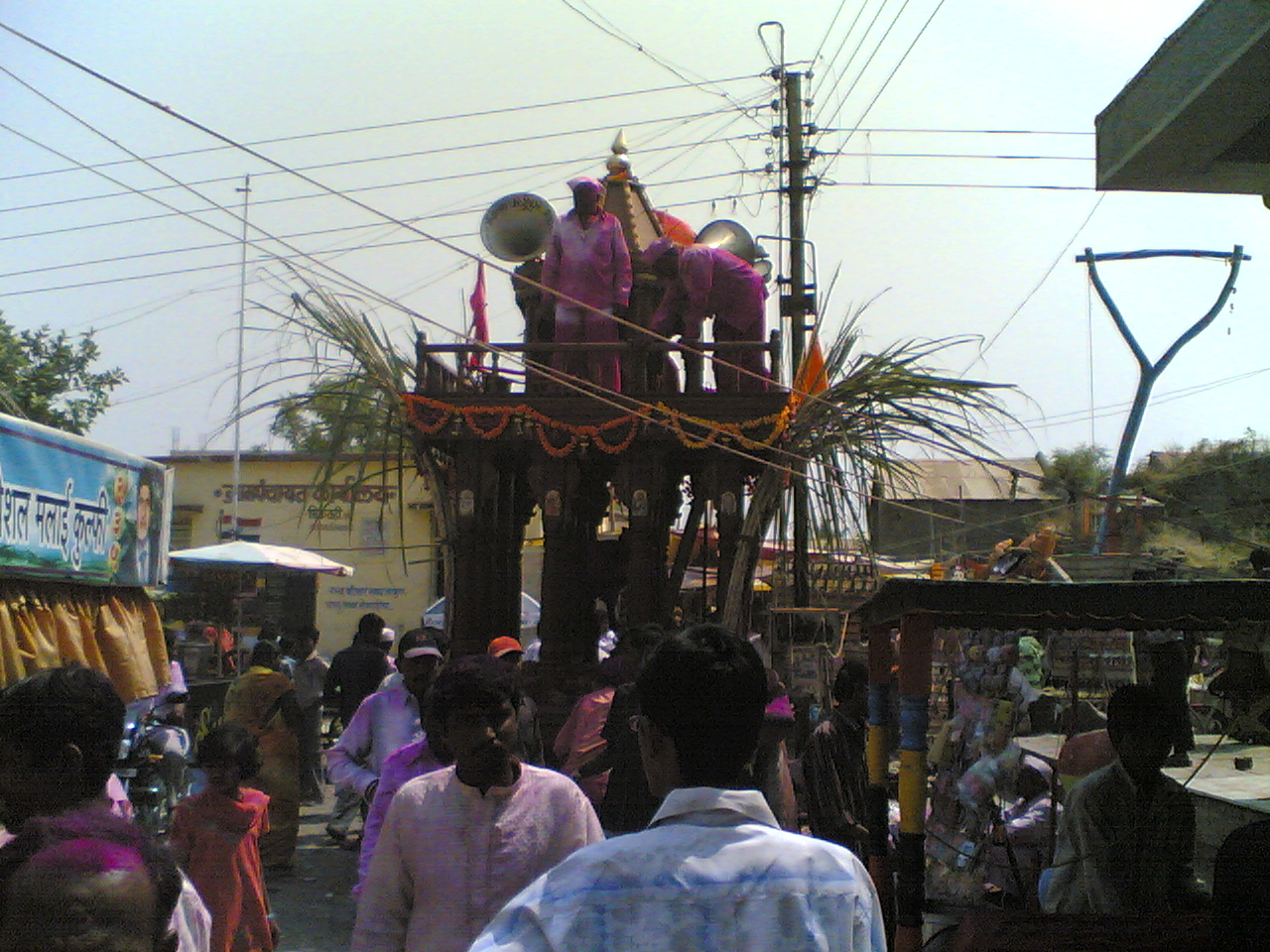
Jatra

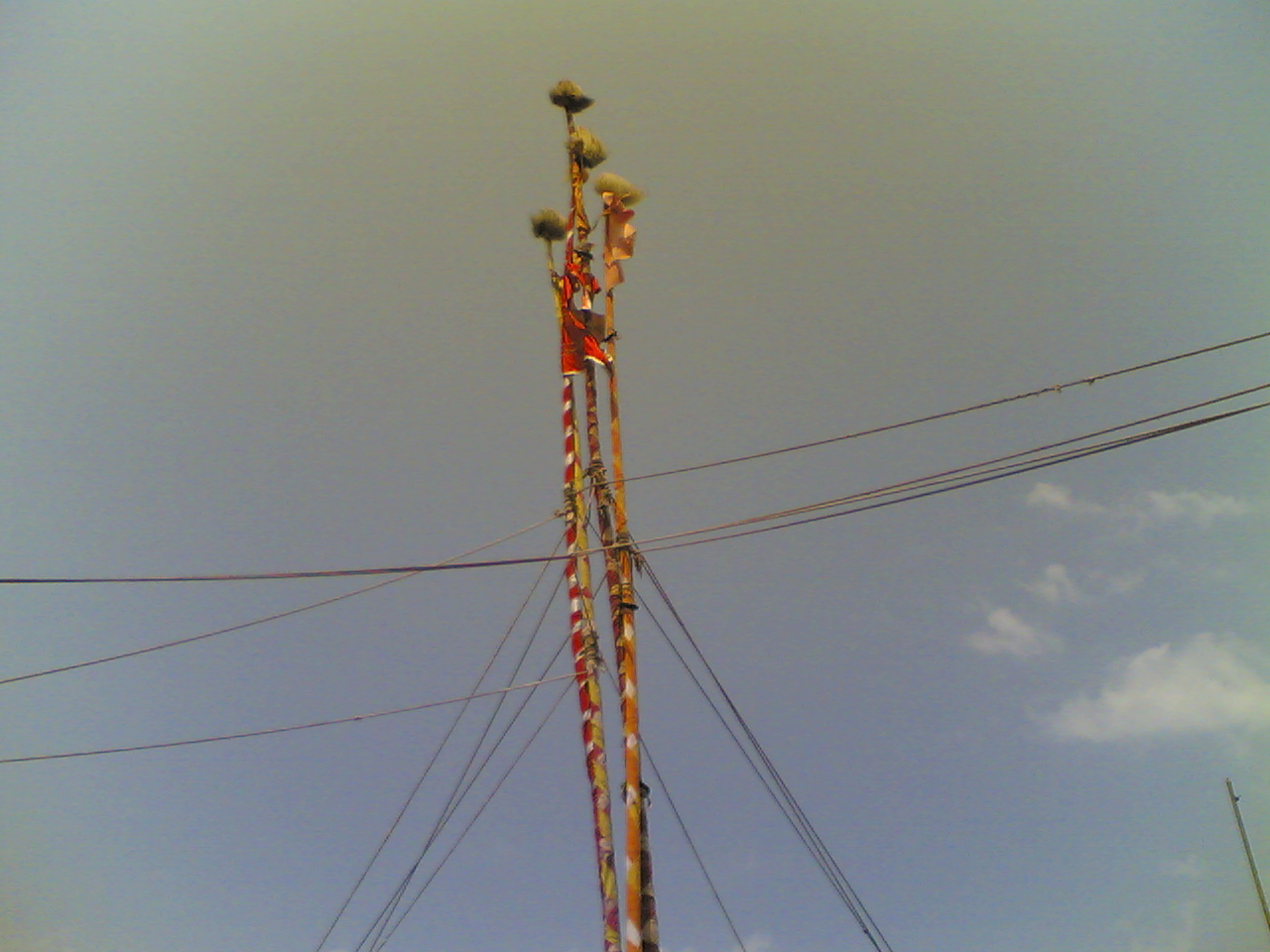
Gudhi

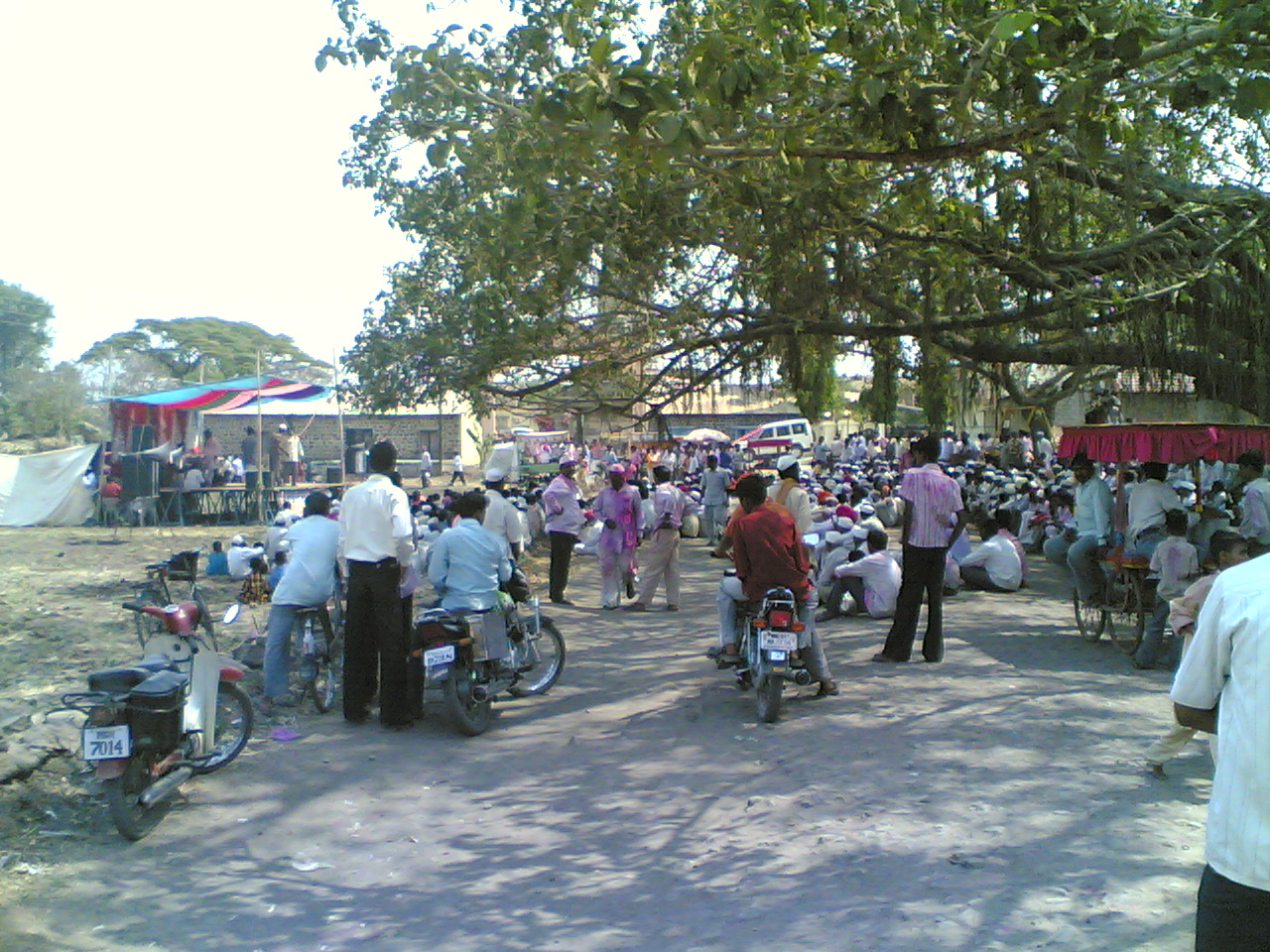
Tamasha
