= Dham Talwandi Khurd =

Administrative seat in Punjab, India

Dham Talwandi Khurd is the seat of an Ashram (community) established 24 km away from Ludhiana and 5 km away from Mullanpur City, in the state of Punjab in Northern India. When two villages share a name they are distinguished with Kalan (big) and Khurd (small).

Dham Talwandi Khurd is managed by the Swami Ganganand Bhuriwale Trust. It is located about 30 kilometers from the Ludhiana city center.

== History ==
Talwandi Khurd was established in 1905 by followers of the Garib Dassi sect.

== SGB Children's Home ==
SGB Children's Home was established under the patronage of Swami Shankera Nand jee Bhuriwale. SGB Children's Home provides long term care to orphan/abandoned children.

SGB Children's Home is based on a sacred principle that every child has the right to live and grow in a family. A group of 7-8 children live under care of a dedicated woman who has devoted her life for the cause of needy children. A major part of the organization work is shared by Bibi Jasbir Kaur, Mr. Kuldip Singh and Ms. Ramanjot Kaur.

SGB International Organization, the parent institution of the SGB Children's Home is a recognized and authorized agency by the State and Central governments for both In-country and inter-country adoption of children.

This organization also runs a grade 12 level school, St. Kabir Academy, recognized by the Central Board of Secondary Education (CBSE). Focus of this school is primarily to provide education to rural children who would otherwise find difficult to get access to quality education.
