= Rurkee Kalan =

Rurkee Kalan is a village in Punjab, India. Khurd and Kalan are Persian words which mean small and big respectively. When two villages have the same name then they are distinguished by adding to their name Kalan (big) or Khurd (small), based on their size relative to each other.
