= Jataria Khurd =

Village in Punjab, Pakistan

Jataria Khurd is a village in Kharian Tehsil of Gujrat District, Punjab, Pakistan. It is situated 5 km west of Lalamusa city. Khurd and Kalan are Persian language words which mean small and big, respectively. When two villages are namesakes, they are often distinguished by adding either Khurd (meaning small) or Kalan (meaning big) after their names. Jataria Khurd is situated in the Gunja Union Council. Other villages in this union council are Gunja, Chak Ikhlas, Chak Dina, Hail, Mughli, Dhalla, Chak Rajjadi, Jataria Kalan, Chatta and Sarwani.
