= Mohla Khurd =

Coordinates: 32°30′05″N 74°04′10″E

Mohla Khurd or Mohlān Khurd is a village of Gujrat District, Punjab, Pakistan. It is located at 32°30'5N 74°4'10E, some 8 km from the district capital Gujrat and 1.5 km north of the river Chenab.

Khurd and Kalan are Persian language words, which mean "small" and "big", respectively. When two nearby villages have the same name, they are distinguished by adding Kalan ("big") or Khurd ("small") at the end of the village name.
