= Lidhora Khurd =

Town in India

Coordinates: 23°51′N 78°53′E

Lidhora Khurd is a town in Damoh district of Madhya Pradesh, India. Khurd and Kalan are Persian language words which mean small and big, respectively. When two villages have then same name then they are at times distinguished by adding as Kalan means Big and Khurd means Small to their respective names.
