= Ghotki (disambiguation) =

Ghotki is a city in Sindh, Pakistan.

Ghotki may also refer to:

- Ghotki District, an administrative unit of Sindh
- Ghotki railway station, the city's railway station
  - 2021 Ghotki rail crash, a rail train crash
- Ghotki Taluka, a tehsil of Ghotki District

== See also ==
- Ghoti (disambiguation)
