= Bal Khurd =

Village in India

Bal Khurd is a village in Gorakhpur, Uttar Pradesh, India.Khurd and Kalan are Persian language words, which mean small and big, respectively. When two villages have the same name then they are distinguished by adding Kalan (big) and Khurd (small) at the end of the village name, referring to their size relative to each other.
