= Bhikhi Khurd =

- Location within Pakistan
- Coordinates: 32°21′N 73°00′E
- Country: Pakistan
- Province: Punjab
- District: Sargodha

Population
  - Total: 1,500
- Time zone: UTC+5 (PST)
- Calling code: 048
- Website: www.facebook.com/bhikhi khurd

Bhikhi Khurd is a small village in Bhalwal Tehsil of Sargodha District in Punjab, Pakistan, two kilometres from the M2 motorway. Most of the population are farmers. There are two primary schools, one private school, and three private clinics. The village also has three mosques. Khurd and Kalan are Persian words which mean small and big, respectively. When two villages have the same name, they are distinguished by adding one of the two words at the end of the village name to indicate their size relative to each other.

Gondal is a common surname in Bhikhi Khurd. Notable residents of the village include Chaudhury Ghullam Rasool Gondal, Chaudhury Sarang, Chaudhury M. Pervez Gondal, Chaudhury Adnan Pervez Gondal, late Chaudhury M. Ameer Gondal of the Pakistani Army SSG and Chaudhury Aftab Ahmed Gondal Sub Rtd Muhammad Zafar Iqbql.
