= Ravulapally Khurd =

- Village
- Country: India
- State: Andhra Pradesh
- District: Ranga Reddy
- Metro: Rangareddy district

Government
  - Body: Mandal Office

Languages
  - Official: Telugu
- Time zone: UTC+5:30 (IST)
- Planning agency: Panchayat
- Civic agency: Mandal Office

Ravulapally Khurd is a village and panchayat in Ranga Reddy district, AP, India. It falls under Chevella mandal. Khurd and Kalan are Persian language words which means big and small respectively. When two villages have same name, they are then distinguished as Kalan or Khurd in addition to the village name.
