= Chakori Khurd =

Village in Punjab province, Pakistan

Chakori Khurd is a village some 7 km away from Lalamusa in Gujrat District, Punjab province, Pakistan. It is located in union council Kotla Qasim Khan.

Khurd and Kalan are Persian language words which mean "small" and "big" respectively. When two nearby villages have then same name, they are often distinguished by adding Kalan (big) or Khurd (small) at the end of the village name.
