= Koregaon taluka =

Koregaon Taluka
- Taluka
- Location in Maharashtra, India
- Coordinates: 17.6974196°N 74.1631331°E
- Country: India
- State: Maharashtra
- District: Satara district

Government
  - Lok Sabha constituency: Satara
  - Assembly constituency: Koregaon
  - MLA: Mahesh Shambhajiraje Shinde

Languages
  - Official: Marathi
- Time zone: UTC+5:30 (IST)

Koregaon taluka is a Taluka in Satara subdivision of Satara district of state of Maharashtra in India.

== See also ==
- Pimpode Budruk
