= Dugauli Khurd =

Coordinates: 25°56′N 82°28′E

Dugauli Khurd is a village in Khutahan, Jaunpur district, Varanasi division, Uttar Pradesh, India. Khurd and Kalan are Persian words which mean small and big respectively. When two villages have the same name, they are distinguished by adding Kalan to the name of the bigger village and Khurd to the name of the smaller one.
