= Talwandi Kalan =

Talwandi Kalan Village Sarpanch Name is Parminder Singh Dhanoa this village is Sidhwan Bet Mandal. Talwandi Kalan is in Jagraon, Ludhiana district, Punjab, India.Khurd and Kalan Punjabi (ਪੰਜਾਬੀ-ਭਾਸ਼ਾ) language word which means small and Big respectively when two villages have same name then it is distinguished as Kalan means Big Village Name. This village is about 10 km from Mullanpur Dakha and is nearby the villages Swaddi Kalan and Gureh. The exact cartographic location of Talwandi Kalan is (30.853849,75.592875).

== Demographics ==
The current population of Talwandi Kalan is about 3500 persons living in about 550 households. As of the 2011 India Census, the population of Talwandi Kalan was about 3500 persons living in about 550 households. 30.5% of the population is illiterate. The major Jatt clan in the village is of Dhanoa.

== Religion ==
- Gurdwara Singh Sabha is located at centre of Talwandi Kalan.
- Baba Dher wale is beautiful religious place in Talwandi Kalan. It is spiritual building established in 15th century.
- Shiv Dawala is a shiv temple located next to the Gurudawara Sahib.
- The village also has an old mosque that has existed for many years.

== Government ==
The following are government representatives of Talwandi Kalan:

Sarpanch

- Parminder Singh Dhanoa ( Congress Party )

Panch

- Jagwinder Singh Bhola ( Congress Party )

== Education ==
There is one government primary school and one government secondary school in Talwandi Kalan. Also notable is Mahant Lachhman Dass High School, a school that provides education to villagers in and beyond Talwandi Kalan.

== Natural resources ==
Talwandi Kalan has one clean source of water that provides 39 liters per capita per day; the Indian government categorizes this water source as partial coverage for the village. The presence of trace elements Selenium and Fluorine in the water of Talwandi Kalan has resulted in lower incidence of dental caries in village children than children of neighboring villages Dhanansu and Bhatian, whose water lacks these elements.

== Businesses ==
- Jagtar Filling Station
- Deppa Karyana Store This Store is owned by nokwal family and all kind of karyana goods are available here.

It has got all the basic amenities like a school, hospital and a corporation society. The villages has a total of 2200 votes. The total land area of the village is 2,100 acres (8.5 km^{2}).

== In popular media ==
The 2007 film, End of Abundance, a documentary filmed by two Canadians, explores the ecological crisis, poverty, and ending productivity in India through the eyes of a farmer and student in Talwandi Kalan.

The film Jatt te Zameen was shot in Talwandi Kalan mainly in properties owned by Dalip Singh Dhanoa (deceased) and Gurcharan Singh Dhanoa (now living in Calgary, AB, Canada)

On 6 December 1988, Punjabi film actor Veerendra was shot and killed by terrorists during the filming of a movie in Talwandi Kalan. The terrorists had opened fire on a house owned by the then-former Minister of India.

== Notable people from Talwandi Kalan ==
- Amrik Singh Talwandi Writer. Amrik Singh Talwandi was Awarded National Award in year 1993 from Government of India He was awarded the State Award from Punjab Government in the year 1988.
- Pohla Singh was a freedom fighter who went in KAMAGATAMARU ship in the 20th century.
- Dalip Singh Dhanoa, was a minister in Punjab from serving from 1976-1978.
- Narinjan Singh was a freedom fighter during India's revolution. He was a sepoy in the 14th Sikhs at Multan.
- Parbhat Singh, born in 1916, was a freedom fighter taken as prisoner of war.
- Ram Singh, born in 1921, was a freedom fighter who served the Indian Army as Sepoy No. 913746
- Havaldar Jaswant Singh of 118 Engineers Regiment sacrificed his life fighting insurgents at Badipur in Jammu and Kashmir.
- Sardaar Jeet Singh Dhanoa was the successful farmer of the village.
