= Kabra Khurd =

- Village
- Location within Jharkhand Location within India
- Coordinates: 24°31′31.73″N 83°54′29.34″E
- Country: India
- State: Jharkhand
- District: Palamu
- Taluka: Medininagar

Government
  - Type: Grampanchayat

Population (2011)
  - Total: 6,000

Sex ratio

Language
  - Official: Hindi
- Time zone: UTC+5:30 (IST)
- PIN: 822115
- STD Code: +91-XXXX
- Vehicle registration: JH-03 (Daltonganj)

Kabra Khurd is a village in Palamu district of Jharkhand state, India. Khurd and Kalan are Persian language words which mean small and big respectively. When two villages have the same name, they are at times distinguished by adding the words Kalan big or Khurd small to the village name.

It is a located near Son river. The population is approximately 6000. Languages spoken here are Urdu, Hindi, English, Arabic and local dialects. Cricket and Football are most popular sports here.
