= Dharoti Khurd =

- Census town
- Location in Uttar Pradesh, India Dharoti Khurd (India)
- Coordinates: 28°44′51″N 77°18′39″E
- Country: India
- State: Uttar Pradesh
- District: Ghaziabad

Population (2001)
  - Total: 34,015

Languages
  - Official: Hindi
- Time zone: UTC+5:30 (IST)
- Vehicle registration: UP
- Website: up.gov.in

Dharoti Khurd is a census town in Ghaziabad district in the state of Uttar Pradesh, India. Khurd and Kalan are Persian language words which mean small and Big respectively when two villages have same name then they are distinguished as Kalan means Big and Khurd means Small with the two villages' names.

== Demographics ==
As of 2001 India census, Dharoti Khurd had a population of 34,015. Males constitute 54% of the population and females 46%. Dharoti Khurd has an average literacy rate of 58%, lower than the national average of 59.5%: male literacy is 67% and, female literacy is 47%. In Dharoti Khurd, 17% of the population is under 6 years of age.
