= Gunja, Gujrat =

Gunja گنجه
- Union council and town
- Interactive map of Gunja گنجه
- Coordinates: 32°43′16″N 73°52′02″E
- Country: Pakistan
- Region: Punjab
- District: Gujrat
- Tehsil: Kharian
- Time zone: UTC+5 (PST)
  - Summer (DST): UTC+6 (PDT)
- Postal Code: 50141
- Area code: 0537

Gunja (Urdu: گنجه ) is a town and union council of Kharian Tehsil and Gujrat District, in the Punjab province of Pakistan. Other villages in the union council are Chak Ikhlas, Mughli, Dhalla, Chak Rajjadi, Jataria Khurd, Jataria Kalan, Chatta and Shah Sarmast.

== Geography ==
The nearest city is Lalamusa. Gunja is a midpoint between three cities Dinga, Kharian and Lalamusa. It is almost 11 km from Lalamusa and 15 km from Kharian and Digna. Surrounding villages of Gunja are Hail, Bashna, Chak Iklas and Mughli Wali. Gunja is 8 km from G.T. Road.

Gunja has a government hospital, some private clinics and a branch of Habib Bank Limited.

== Lifestyle ==
The village is surrounded on all sides by farmland. The major trades in the town are farming, masonry, and other types of manual labor. Gunja has a large diaspora living overseas, mainly in Middle East, United States, and Europe. Remittances sent from overseas are a major source of income of the village.

== Schools ==
Gunja has a number of private and government schools including:

- Government boys High School
- Government girls High School
- Muazzam Ideal Public higher secondary School
- Tipu Junior Model School
- Al-Qalam Public School
- Quality Education School System

== Notable people ==
- Sultan M. Babar is a member of the board of health and the head of its medical department in Carteret, NJ He was also a delegate to the 2012 Democratic National Convention for President Barack Obama.
