= Ramjipura Khurd =

Ramjipura Khurd is a small village 50 km away from Jaipur, Rajasthan, India. There are more than 200 houses. Many Rajputs live in Ramjipura Khurd, as well as other castes.
