= Kotli Khurd, Mandi Bahauddin =

Coordinates: 32°31′N 73°41′E

Kotli Khurd is a village in Mandi Bahauddin District of the Punjab province of Pakistan. It is situated 28 km south-east of the district capital - Mandi Bahauddin and 12 km east of the town of Phalia. The population of Kotli Khurd is about 1,000. The literacy rate is above 35%. The village is well cultivated area the main crops are wheat rice and sugar cane, most people are farmers and government servants. The village has been developing since the 1947 partition of India. Khurd and Kalan are Persian language words, meaning small and big, respectively. When two villages have the same name, they are distinguished by adding Kalan (big) or Khurd (small) at the end of the village name in reference to their size relative to each other.
