= Jeffrey Kang =

Chinese billionaire entrepreneur

- 康敬伟
- Born: Kang Jingwei; 6 February 1970 (age 56); Chongqing, China
- Education: South China University of Technology
- Occupation: Internet entrepreneur
- Known for: Founding and leading Cogobuy
- Title: Chairman and CEO of Cogobuy
- Board member of: Cogobuy
- Spouse: Nan Ji
- Children: 2

Chinese name
- Simplified Chinese: 康敬伟
- Traditional Chinese: 康敬偉
Transcriptions
Standard Mandarin
- Hanyu Pinyin: Kāng Jìngwěi

Jeffrey Kang, or Kang Jingwei (Chinese: 康敬伟, born February 6, 1970), is a Chinese billionaire entrepreneur. He is the founder and CEO of the Shenzhen-based Cogobuy Group, the largest corporate procurement e-commerce platform for IC components in China with worldwide sales and distribution.

== Early and personal life ==
Kang was born in Chongqing on 6 February 1970. He has two children with his wife Nan Ji and resides with his family in Overseas Chinese Town (OCT), Shenzhen, Guangdong.

In July 1991 Kang received a Bachelor of Science degree in Electrical Engineering from South China University of Technology in Guangzhou, Guangdong.

In 2006, Kang was ranked among the richest people in China by Forbes, with a net worth of CN¥17 billion. In 2015, he joined the ranks of The World's Billionaires defined in USD terms by Forbes at age 45. Kang's total calculated executive compensation listed in his firm's annual accounts for 2014 was CN¥2,933,000 (c. US$500,000).

== Business career ==
Kang started his career in China's telecommunications sector as a sales engineer in charge of the components business for Matsushita Electric Industrial now known as Panasonic from 1992 to 1995. In 1995 he invested US$50,000 to start his own company called the Comtech Group, to act as a distribution channel for the sale of electronic components in China. In 2002, the Comtech Group went public and was listed on the New York Stock Exchange (NASDAQ) as Viewtran (ticker: VIEW). In 2011, he established the first online platform for selling IC components in China, Cogobuy, which went public on the Hong Kong Stock Exchange in July 2014 with an annual turnover of CN¥84 billion in 2014.

== Honors and awards ==
- 2015: Ernst & Young Entrepreneur Of The Year Award, China
