= Kusgaon Budruk =

- Census town
- Location in Maharashtra, India
- Coordinates: 18.7239°N 73.3965°E
- Country: India
- State: Maharashtra
- District: Pune

Population (2011)
  - Total: 15,612

Languages
  - Official: Marathi
- Time zone: UTC+5:30 (IST)

Kusgaon Budruk is a census town in Pune district in the Indian state of Maharashtra.

== Demographics ==
As of 2001 India census, Kusgaon Budruk had a population of 15612. Males constitute 53% of the population and females 47%. Kusgaon Budruk has an average literacy rate of 66%, higher than the national average of 59.5%: male literacy is 74%, and female literacy is 56%. In Kusgaon Budruk, 14% of the population is under 6 years of age. The Singhgad institute of technology is also situated in this area, it is also one of the most important part of lonavala
