= Pakho Kalan =

- village
- Location in Punjab, India Pakho Kalan (India)
- Coordinates: 30.2175°N 75.4175°E
- Country: India
- India: Punjab
- District: Barnala

languages
  - official: Punjabi
  - Regional: Punjabi
- Time zone: UTC+5:30 (IST)
- PIN: 148108
- Website: barnala.gov.in

Pakho Kalan is a village of Punjab, India which is located in Barnala district and situated on the Barnala–Mansa road. It is 22 km from Barnala and 28 km from Mansa.

== Educational Institutions ==
- Government Senior Secondary School
- Shaheed Ranjeet Singh Shaurya Chakra Vijeta Government Primary School
- Saint Bachanpuri International School
- Sant Baba Longpuri Adarsh Senior Secondary School
- Saint Longpuri Brilliant School

== Notable Personalities ==
- Jathedar Ajit Singh
- Saheed Ranjit Singh
