= Khasala Khurd =

- Location within Pakistan
- Coordinates: 33.26°N 72.58°E
- Country: Pakistan
- Province: Punjab (Pakistan)
- District: Rawalpindi
- Elevation: 370 m (1,210 ft)
- Time zone: UTC+5 (PST)

Khasala Khurd is a village in Rawalpindi District in the Punjab province of Pakistan. It is located at 33°26'45N 72°58'23E with an altitude of 370 metres (1217ft) and lies south of the district capital, Rawalpindi. Khurd and Kalan are Persian language words which mean small and big respectively. When two villages have the same name then they are distinguished by adding Kalan (big) and Khurd (small) at the end of the village name, in reference to their size relative to each other.
