= Jonaicha Khurd =

Jonaicha Khurd Jonayacha Khurd, Udiyapur (old name)
- village
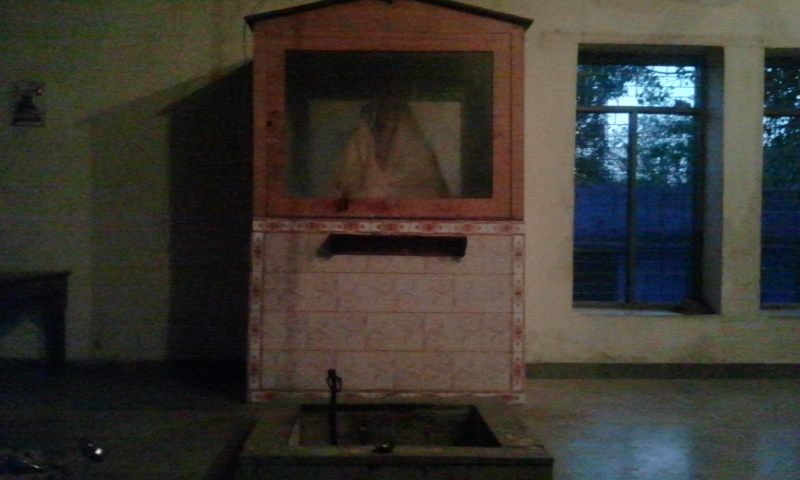
- Baba Kundan Das Temple, Jonaicha Khurd
- Nickname: Chhota Jonayacha
- Location in Rajasthan, India Jonaicha Khurd (India)
- Coordinates: 28.023°N 76.446°E
- Country: India
- State: Rajasthan
- District: Alwar
- Elevation: 363 m (1,191 ft)

Population (2008)
  - Total: 3,500+

Languages
  - Official: Hindi
- Time zone: UTC+5:30 (IST)
- PIN: 301706
- ISO 3166 code: RJ-IN

Jonaicha Khurd is a village of Neemrana tehsil and the Alwar district in Rajasthan state, India, with a population around 3,500+.

== Location ==
Jonaicha Khurd is located at 28.023°N 76.446°E, 5 kilometres (3.1 mi) inside the north-eastern border Rajasthan-Haryana. It is 3 kilometres (1.9 mi) from National Highway number 8 (NH-8) at Shahajahanpur}.the nearest railway station, Bawal, is 20 kilometres (12 mi) Joniacha Khurd is surrounded by Bani Jonaicha to the south, Sanseri and Jonaicha Kalan to the west, Gugalkota to the east and Khandoda (Haryana) to the north. The tourist and industrial site Neemrana is 8 kilometres (5.0 mi) from the village.

== Political constituency ==
Jonaicha Khurd is part of the Alwar constituency of the Lok Sabha of the Indian parliament and of the Mundawar constituency of the state legislative assembly Vidhansabha. Until 2007, it was in the Behror legislative assembly seat. It is in Neemrana panchayat samiti and is the headquarters of Jonaicha Khurd Panchayat.
