= Khardon Kalan =

Village in Madhya Pradesh, India

Coordinates: 23.468°N 76.970°E

Khardon Kalan (sometimes written as Khardoun Kalan, Khardone Kalan) is a village in Shajapur district, Madhya Pradesh, India. It is situated 69 kilometres (43 mi) from the state capital, Bhopal and 34 km (21.1 mi) from Shujalpur. The nearest highway is at 10 km (6.2 mi), NH-12 (Jaipur-Jabalpur), and the railway station is Kalapipal.

== Demographics ==
As of the 2011 Census of India, Khardon Kalan had a population of 5,296 spread over 1,053 households. Males constitute 52.1% of the population and females 47.9%. Khardon Kalan has an average literacy rate of 67.76%, while 12.8% of the population is under 6 years of age.
