= Nanu Khurd =

Coordinates: 28°17′N 76°43′E

Nanu Khurd is a mid-sized Yadav dominated village located in the district of Gurgaon in the state of Haryana in India.

== Population ==
It has a population of about 1109 persons living in around 189 households.
