= Pooth Khurd =

Census town in Delhi, India

Pooth Khurd Choti Pooth
- Village
- Location in India
- Coordinates: 28.76867°N 77.05811°E
- Country: India
- State: Delhi
- District: North West

Government
  - Type: Government of the National Capital Territory of Delhi
  - Body: Municipal Corporation of Delhi

Population (2001)
  - Total: 8,167

Languages
  - Official: Hindi, English
  - Mother Tongue: Hindi & Haryanvi
  - Nickname: Choti Pooth
- Time zone: UTC+5:30 (IST)
- PIN: 110039

Pooth Khurd is a village in North West district in the Indian state of Delhi. Pooth Khurd is village among the other villages in outer Delhi.

== Demographics ==
Historical population
Year	Pop.	±%
1981	7,145	—
1991	8,293	+16.1%
2001	8,164	−1.6%
2011	10,654	+30.5%
Source: Government of India

In 2011, Pooth Khurd had a population of 10,654 with 5,741 males and 4,913 females. It grew by 30.5% from 2001, when it had a population of 8,164.
