= Bhainsru Khurd =

- Village (Rohtak)
- Location in Haryana, India Bhainsru Khurd (India)
- Coordinates: 28.81°N 76.80°E
- Country: India
- State: Haryana

Languages
  - Official: Hindi
- Time zone: UTC+5:30 (IST)
- Vehicle registration: HR
- Website: haryana.gov.in

Bhainsru Khurd is a village in Rohtak district of Haryana, India. According to 2011 Census of India population of the village is 4,211.
