= Cogobuy =

Chinese enterprise service platform

Cogobuy Group
- Native name: 科通芯城
- Company type: Public
- Traded as: SEHK: 400
- Industry: Consumer Electronics
- Founded: February 2012
- Founder: Jeffrey Kang
- Headquarters: Shenzhen, Guangdong, China
- Number of locations: 18
- Area served: Worldwide
- Key people: Jeffrey Kang (Chairman and CEO)
- Brands: Cogobuy.com
- Revenue: ▲CN¥12.9 billion (2016)
- Operating income: ▲CN¥649 million (2016)
- Net income: ▲CN¥510 million (2016)
- Total assets: ▲CN¥8.6 billion (2016)
- Total equity: ▲CN¥3.7 billion (2016)
- Number of employees: 500
- Subsidiaries: IngDan; Comtech; FOXSAAS
- Website: CogobuyGroup.com

Cogobuy Group is a Chinese enterprise service platform.

Following a major business restructuring in 2019, the group merged chip sales service on Cogobuy.com into Comtech, and merged R&D and IoT product financing and corporate services, previously under INGDAN.com AIoT business services platform, into IngDan, forming a new "Comtech + IngDan" dual business model.

IngDan focus on developing proprietary products for different AIoT industries, including the Internet of Vehicles, smart homes, AI surveillance, etc.

== History ==
=== 1995–2012: Pre founding ===
Cogobuy was founded by Jeffrey Kang in February 2012. The founder had previous experience in the electronic component industry in China where, prior to founding Cogobuy, he owned and operated companies which had comparable service offerings. One such company was Comtech, founded in 1995, which has since become a subsidiary of Cogobuy and has continued its operations.

=== 2012–2014: Early history ===
After being founded, Cogobuy acquired several entities previously owned by Viewtran (a company also founded by Jeffery Kang), which continued their operations in the trading of IC and other electronic components.

In 2014, Cogobuy's stock floated an initial public offering on the Hong Kong Stock Exchange at HK$4.00 per share under the symbol SEHK: 400, raising HK$1.37 billion and underwritten by UBS. Over the first year, its stock had a return of 107.75%.

=== 2014–present: Continued developments ===
In 2015, Cogobuy and its subsidiary IngDan (硬蛋) formed a strategic cooperation with Chinese technology company Lenovo to develop IoT and Smart Home devices. Prior to the partnership, Lenovo primarily purchased its IC components from Cogobuy.

In 2017, Cogobuy alongside IngDan entered into collaboration with Haier to develop smart appliance products.

Cogobuy and its subsidiary IngDan formed a partnership with Toyota in 2019 to collaborate and create a Smart Car Ecosystem to enable better utilisation of smart-car technologies and move in the direction of intelligence-oriented product development.

== Products and services ==
=== E-Commerce Platform ===
Cogobuy's e-commerce platform, named Cogobuy.com, includes primarily a direct sales platform and an online marketplace. It serves electronic manufacturers, including small and medium-sized enterprises. The online marketplace, launched in 2013, enables third-party merchants sell their products to customers and pay Cogobuy commissions. The direct sales platform instead offers electronic components to customers directly.

In 2013, Cogobuy's online sales increased from RMB$217 million to RMB$3.9 billion (US$35.07 million to US$630.30 million), resulting in approximately 50% marketshare of the Chinese online electronic components market.

In 2015, the direct sales platform accounted for 76.1% of the revenue generated by the website, with the online marketplace accounting for 16.3% and the balance resulting from supply chain financing.

=== CRM Platform ===
Cogobuy provides a CRM service primary for Chinese small and medium-sized enterprises through its wholly owned subsidiary FOXSAAS.
