= Jamber =

Jamber جمبر
- Town
- Location within Pakistan
- Coordinates: 30°56′56″N 73°44′36″E
- Country: Pakistan
- Province: Punjab
- District: Kasur

Population
  - Total: 70,000
- Time zone: UTC+5 (PST)
- Calling code: 49

Jamber (Urdu, Punjabi: جمبر) is a town and Municipality in Kasur District in the Punjab province of Pakistan.

Jambar has several public facilities, including a basic health unit, post office, high schools for both boys and girls, and a telephone exchange. Two banks, HBL and BOP, operate here. Numerous private educational institutions, owned by individuals, are also present, with Rafiq Model School being a well-known and prominent school. It is affiliated with the Punjab Education Foundation and offers free education to needy students.

Cricket is a popular sport here, along with football, kabaddi, volleyball, and badminton.

== Location ==
It is situated on the N-5, approximately 11 kilometres (6.8 mi) from Phoolnagar and 66 kilometres (41 mi) from Lahore.

Century Paper & Board Mills, a well-established company, is located near Jamber. The town is steadily progressing.
