= Thupra Khurd =

- Village
- Country: India
- State: Andhra Pradesh
- District: Ranga Reddy
- Metro: Rangareddy district

Government
  - Body: Mandal Office

Languages
  - Official: Telugu
- Time zone: UTC+5:30 (IST)
- Planning agency: Panchayat
- Civic agency: Mandal Office

Thupra Khurd is a village and panchayat in Ranga Reddy district, Andhra Pradesh, India. It falls under Maheswaram mandal. When two villages have the same name then they are distinguished as kalan, which means big in Persian, and khurd, meaning small, with the village name.
