= Toole Khurd =

- Village
- Country: India
- State: Telangana

Languages
  - Official: Telugu
- Time zone: UTC+5:30 (IST)
- Telephone code: 040
- Vehicle registration: AP 26

Toole Khurd is a village in Ranga Reddy district in Telangana, India. It falls under Yacharam mandal. Khurd and Kalan are Persian words which means small and big, respectively. They are used to distinguished to villages or towns of the same name by adding Kalan to the name of the bigger one and Khurd to the name of the smaller one.
