= Khasala Kalan =

- Location within Pakistan
- Coordinates: 33.26°N 72.58°E
- Country: Pakistan
- Province: Punjab (Pakistan)
- District: Rawalpindi
- Elevation: 370 m (1,210 ft)
- Time zone: UTC+5 (PST)
- Website: https://www.facebook.com/Khasala.Kalan

Khasala Kalan is a village of Rawalpindi District in the Punjab province of Pakistan. It is located at 33°26'24N 72°58'25E with an altitude of 370 meters (1,217 ft) and lies south of the Rawalpindi on Adyala road and approximately about 6 km meter ahead from Adyala jail. A significant proportion of the population belong to the Araien and Rajput families. A small dam is Located Behind The Village Khasala Kalan.
