= Nangal Khurd =

- Village
- Location in Punjab, India Nangal Khurd (India)
- Coordinates: 31.357512°N 76.004954°E
- Country: India
- State: Punjab
- District: Hoshiarpur
- Founder: Bains Jatts

Government
  - Type: Panchayat
  - Body: Sarpanch

Area
  - Total: 15 km^{2} (5.8 sq mi)

Population (2001)
  - Total: 1,300
  - Density: 300/km^{2} (780/sq mi)

Languages
  - Official: Punjabi
- Time zone: UTC+5:30 (IST)
- PIN: 146101
- Telephone code: 01884
- Vehicle registration: PB 07
- Sex ratio: 1:1 ♂/♀

Nangal Khurd is a small village in the Hoshiarpur district of Punjab, India. Kalan is a Persian language word which means big and Khurd is a Persian word which means small; when two villages have the same name they are distinguished with the appropriate term together with the village's name. The total area of the village is 15 square kilometres and the population is around 1300. Nangal Khurd is situated 4 km from Mahilpur on Mahilpur-Phagwara Road (Via-Pasta).

The current Sarpanch is Mrs. Rajwinder Kaur. The village has one government school, one government dispensary and sangeet vidalya.

Most of the village's population is Bains Jatt caste. Sant Baba Harnam Singh Bains ji was born in this village and lived their childhood there. They divert to Saint after getting spiritual powers and did their meditation in village jeaan which is just 10 km from their own village Nangal Khurd (Mahilpur). After them in 1930 their follower built big Gurudwara Sahib at place of their hut in village jeaan. Village jeaan which is actually on Rajni Mata Road near Chabbewal. Gurudwara is on Sant ji name. Most people of general cast lived in abroad.

== History ==
The village Nangal Kalan and Nangal Khurd were founded by Bains Jatts couple of centuries ago, Bains Jatts have Bara of 12 Villages & Bahia of 22 Villages in the Area including Village Mahilpur as well as there are more villages of Bains Jatts With Origin Place at Village Khera, Nangal Means a Plough and the area that was farmed under the plough of Bains Jatts came to be known as Nangal, that's how their 2 settlements got the name Nangal and based on their Population larger Nangal came to be known as Nangal kalan "ਵੱਡਾ ਨੰਗਲ" & smaller Nangal Came to be known as Nangal Khurd "ਛੋਟਾ ਨੰਗਲ", Kalan means big and Khurd means Small

Sardar Didar Singh Bains a prominent Sikh leader who was the first President of WSO was from Nangal Khurd his family owns More than 40,000 acres of Land

The village was also the headquarters of Zail Nangal kalan amounting 20 villages under the Zaildar Achhar Singh Bains.
