= Nimbhore Budruk =

- town
- Location in Maharashtra, India
- Coordinates: 21.1667°N 75.9667°E
- Country: India
- State: Maharashtra
- District: Jalgaon

Population (2001)
  - Total: 8,449

Languages
  - Official: Marathi
- Time zone: UTC+5:30 (IST)

Nimbhore Budruk is a census town in Jalgaon district in the Indian state of Maharashtra.

== Demographics ==
As of 2001 India census, Nimbhore Budruk had a population of 8449. Males constitute 53% of the population and females 47%. Nimbhore Budruk has an average literacy rate of 83%, higher than the national average of 59.5%: male literacy is 87%, and female literacy is 78%. In Nimbhore Budruk, 9% of the population is under 6 years of age.

Year	Male	Female	Total Population	Change	Religion (%)							
Year	Male	Female	Total Population	Change	Hindu	Muslim	Christian	Sikhs	Buddhist	Jain	Other religions and persuasions	Religion not stated
2001	4485	3963	8448	-	78.184	6.013	0.462	0.320	14.477	0.331	0.142	0.071
2011	4006	3495	7501	-0.112	82.869	8.186	0.253	0.200	7.892	0.293	0.067	0.240
