= Rajpur Khurd =

Locality in Delhi, India

Rajpur Rajpur Extension
- Village and colony
- Rajpur Khurd
- Country: India
- State: Delhi
- District: South Delhi

Government
  - Type: State government
  - Body: Delhi Legislative Assembly

Languages
  - Official: Hindi, English
- Time zone: UTC+5:30 (IST)
- PIN: 110068
- Civic body: Municipal Corporation of Delhi
- Website: rajpurkhurd.com

Rajpur Khurd is a locality in the Chhatarpur area of South Delhi district. It consists the Rajpur Khurd village and the Rajpur Khurd Extension, a residential colony.

Its postal code is 110074, and the post office and the police station are Maidan Garhi.

== Connectivity ==
The nearest Metro stations are Chhatarpur and Qutab Minar. Delhi Transport Corporation bus routes 516, 523, 947 and 434 go through Rajpur bus stand.

== Educational institutes ==
- Indira Gandhi National Open University
- South Asian University
- Made Easy School, Chhatarpur Campus
