= Kotli Khurd, Nowshera =

Village in Nowshera District, Pakistan

Coordinates: 32°31′N 73°41′E

Kotli Khurdکوٹلی خورد ("small village") is a small village located at the foot of Cherat hill area of Nowshera District, Pakistan. It is 23 kilometers from Pabbi Railway Station, near Kotli Kalan, Saleh Khana with a population of about 5000. Khurd and Kalan are Persian language words which mean small and big respectively. When two villages have the same name then they are distinguished by adding Kalan (big) and Khurd (small) at the end of the village name, with reference to their size relative to each other.

== Clans ==
All of its inhabitants are of Khattak Tribe from Akora Khattak. There are four khel or clans in Kotli Khurd:

- sardar khel (largest)
- hasan khel (2nd largest)
- Janab khel (3rd largest)
- Wahdat khel (smallest)

Main source of economy of this village is small businesses and doing job overseas, particularly in The UK, USA, Canada and Gulf Countries. People of this village are educated with a rough estimate of 85% literacy rate. The village has a middle school for boys, a Primary School for boys and girls and a Girls Primary School. There is no separate Health unit for its people, however, Basic Health Unit is available at one mile distance. Pakistan Tehreek-e-Insaf is the dominant political party.
