= Rampur Khurd =

Rampur Khurd Rāmpur Khurd
- Village
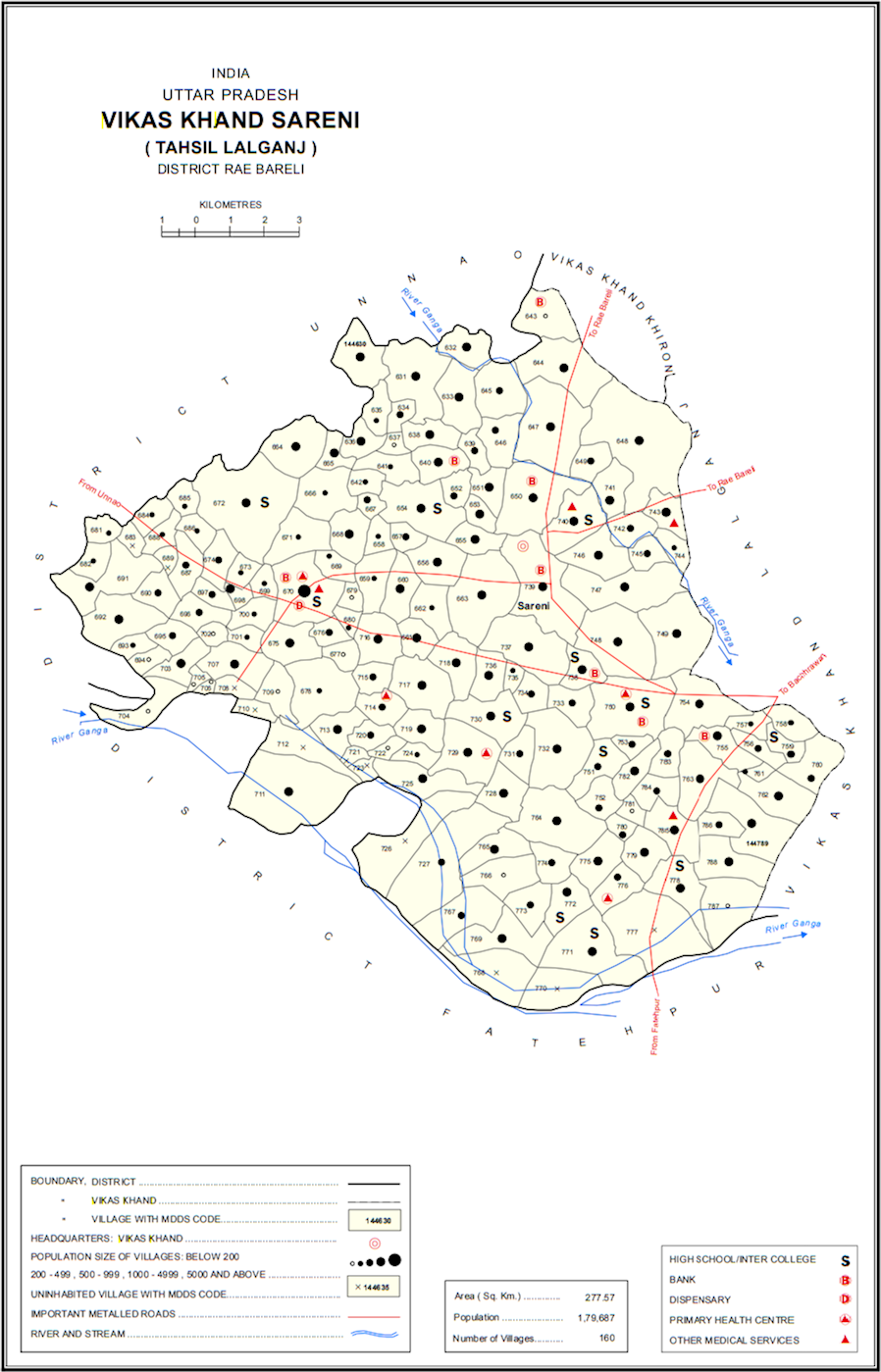
- Map showing Rampur Khurd (#658) in Sareni CD block

- Location in Uttar Pradesh, India
- Coordinates: 26.156303°N 80.777478°E
- Country: India
- State: Uttar Pradesh
- District: Raebareli

Area
  - Total: 0.41 km^{2} (0.16 sq mi)

Population (2011)
  - Total: 303
  - Density: 740/km^{2} (1,900/sq mi)

Languages
  - Official: Hindi
- Time zone: UTC+5:30 (IST)
- Vehicle registration: UP-35

Rampur Khurd is a village in Sareni block of Rae Bareli district, Uttar Pradesh, India. It is located 20 km from Lalganj, the tehsil headquarters. As of 2011, it has a population of 303 people, in 65 households. It has no schools and no healthcare facilities, and it hosts a weekly haat but not a regular market. It belongs to the nyaya panchayat of Murarmau.

The 1951 census recorded Rampur Khurd as comprising 1 hamlet, with a total population of 123 people (60 male and 63 female), in 26 households and 23 physical houses. The area of the village was given as 101 acres. 2 residents were literate, 1 male and 1 female. The village was listed as belonging to the pargana of Sareni and the thana of Sareni.

The 1961 census recorded Rampur Khurd as comprising 1 hamlet, with a total population of 148 people (76 male and 76 female), in 32 households and 24 physical houses. The area of the village was given as 101 acres.

The 1981 census recorded Rampur Khurd as having a population of 195 people, in 36 households, and having an area of 40.47 hectares. The main staple foods were given as wheat and rice.

The 1991 census recorded Rampur Khurd as having a total population of 247 people (124 male and 123 female), in 49 households and 48 physical houses. The area of the village was listed as 41 hectares. Members of the 0-6 age group numbered 38, or 15% of the total; this group was 47% male (18) and 53% female (20). Members of scheduled castes made up 1% of the village's population, while no members of scheduled tribes were recorded. The literacy rate of the village was 23% (46 men and 10 women). 79 people were classified as main workers (72 men and 7 women), while 0 people were classified as marginal workers; the remaining 168 residents were non-workers. The breakdown of main workers by employment category was as follows: 28 cultivators (i.e. people who owned or leased their own land); 43 agricultural labourers (i.e. people who worked someone else's land in return for payment); 0 workers in livestock, forestry, fishing, hunting, plantations, orchards, etc.; 0 in mining and quarrying; 0 household industry workers; 0 workers employed in other manufacturing, processing, service, and repair roles; 1 construction worker; 1 employed in trade and commerce; 1 employed in transport, storage, and communications; and 5 in other services.
