= Ghoti Khurd =

Village in Maharashtra

Coordinates: 17.2528°N 74.6523°E

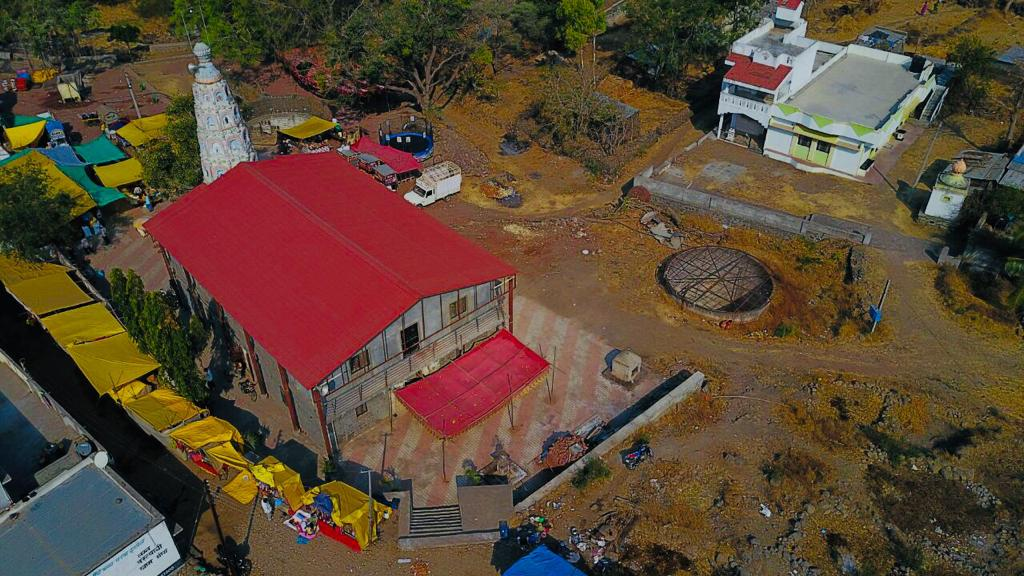

Ghoti Khurd is a small village in the state of Maharashtra. Ghoti Khurd is located in the Sangli district, Khanapur taluka. Khurd and Kalan are Persian language words, which mean small and big respectively. A land known as "Mini Pandhari" on the Ghats, it is the land of many royal witnesses, purified by the touch of "Rajubuvva" (the saint).

It is known for Tukaram Maharaj Bij, its postal pin code is 415311, and is the first ever WiIFi village of the nation. Sachin Kadam is the present sarpanch of Ghoti Khurd. (2018). The village is one which rapidly developing in the way of development. The local market fills up on Tuesday.
