= Jhojhu Kalan =

Jhojhu Kalan Sangwan Chalisi
- village
- Location in Haryana, India Jhojhu Kalan (India)
- Coordinates: 28°30′15″N 76°06′55″E
- Country: India
- State: Haryana
- District: Charkhi Dadri

Population (2005)
  - Total: 8,000

Languages
  - Official: Hindi
- Time zone: UTC+5:30 (IST)
- PIN: 127310
- Telephone code: 012502-
- ISO 3166 code: IN-HR
- Vehicle registration: HR 19
- Nearest city: Charkhi Dadri
- Literacy: 95%
- Lok Sabha constituency: Bhiwani Mahendergarh
- Vidhan Sabha constituency: Badhra
- Website: haryana.gov.in

Jhojhu Kalan is a village in the Charkhi Dadri district of Haryana, India.

== Population, ==
The village is Jaat dominated with most of the people Sangwans, making it one of the biggest Sangwan's village in the region. Predominantly so, because of the common ancestry of the clan that still occupy more than a hundred and fifty of the households in the village. The village has also been recognized for providing the maximum World War II veterans from a single village in India by the Limca Book of Records, 8th Edition. The village is famous for 1st sewer line ever in Haryana. The maximum population of village is serving Indian Army. Jhojhu Kalan was announced "Adrash Village of Haryana" in 2014.

Neighbouring villages (15 –20 km radius) that surround the village are Badhwana, Chandeni, Mehra (village), Rambass, Ramalwas, Rudrol, Gudana, Asawari, Jhojhu Khurd, Kaliyana, Chhillar, Balali, Java etc.

== History ==
Many administrative developments were done by the then retired Army officers post Indian Independence, in the areas of education, building up the first ever only women's school and college.

The Moghul and Colonial relics as preserved largely in and around New Delhi by the ASI manifests itself in amalgamation in the arches of the entrances and the layout of the few of the houses left in the village constructed by the masons of the pre-Independence era. These houses were made of rocks put together with limepowder paste, with ceilings emboldened with heavy wooden beams and tall pillars.

== Administration ==
Jhojhu Kalan represents 13 Sangwan villages under "Sangwan Chalisi (40)". The village has contributed many soldiers to the Indian Army. It has common facilities including a senior secondary school for boys and girls, a girls' college, a CSD chinkara canteen and an ex para military canteen, a civil hospital, public schools, local telephone and mobile exchanges, several banks like State Bank of India and central bank of India and Sarv Haryana gramin Bank and an electricity hub. It has four strong private senior secondary schools: Arya Senior Secondary School, N.R.J. Senior secondary school, Vivekanand Memorial Public School and KCM senior secondary school.

Villagers go on a hill outside the village for religious worship which they call "Dada Dohla Mandir and Gufadhari".

Dada Dohla Mandir is a Hindu temple in village Mehra (village), Charkhi Dadri, Haryana. It is an important place of worship and attracts devotees, especially during full moon (Purnima) of every month. Dada Dohla Mandir is surrounded by other mountains which look very beautiful. Dada Dohla Mandir is situated in village Mehra near Jhojhu which is worshipped by people from the 40 villages in the region.

The area has many small and big aravali mountain ranges and known for stone mining. There are hundreds of stone crushers in the area.

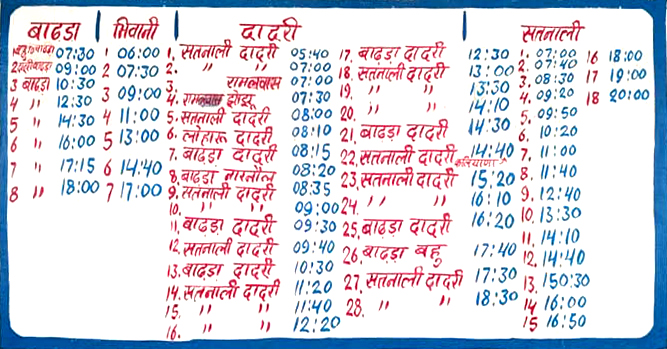
Timetable of bus stand of Jhojhu.

== Location ==
Jhojhu Kalan is surrounded by other Sangwan villages. Kalali and Balali are in the east. Gudana Kalan and Jhojhu Khurd in the West. Village Badal and Mehra (village) in the North and Village Chandeni and Ramlwas in the south and village Rambaas in the west and town Dadri in the east.

== Education ==
=== Primary play schools ===
- Genius mother's Pride Play school, Jhojhu Kalan
- Sun Shine public school, Jhojhu Kalan
- Kilkari Play school ( run by arya sr sec school) Jhojhu Kalan
- Minerva Play School

=== Senior Secondary schools ===
- Arya Senior Secondary School
- Government Girls School, Jhojhu Kalan
- N.R.J Senior Secondary School
- Government Boys school, Jhojhu Kalan
- K.C.M. Senior Secondary school, Jhojhu Kalan
- Vivekananda memorial Public school, Jhojhu Kalan

=== Colleges ===
- Mahila Mahavidyalaya, Jhojhu Kalan
- Arya College Of Education, Jhojhu Kalan
- N.R.J.college
