= Birot Kalan Union Council =

Coordinates: 34.0000°N 73.0000°E

Birote Kalan
- Union Council
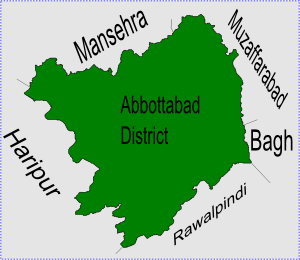
- Birote is located in Abbottabad District
- Interactive map of Birote Kalan
- Country: Pakistan
- Province: Khyber Pakhtunkhwa
- District: Abbottabad

Population
  - Total: 50,012

Birote Kalan is one of the 51 union councils of Abbottabad District in the Khyber-Pakhtunkhwa province of Pakistan. According to the 2023 census it has a total population of 16,218 of which 7,968 are male and 8,250 female.

== Etymology ==
The name of the union council Birote means "the land of wrestlers". The words khurd and kalan ("little" and "big") are administrative terms taken from Persian language dating back to Mughal times, to differentiate two areas with the same name based on their size relative to each other. Birote Khurd hence means "little Birote".

== Location ==
Administrative subdivisions of Berote Kalan

Birote Kalan is located in the south eastern part of Circle Bakote Region of Abbottabad District and borders the Tehsil Dheerkot of Bagh District of Kashmir in East while Mukeshpuri Top & Ayubia in West. The famous Kohala Bridge is located in the north, and Murree in the south. Birote was consequently affected by the 2005 Pakistan earthquake as the epicentre was in Kashmir.

== Subdivisions ==
The Union Council is subdivided into the following areas:

- Birote Kalan
- Birote Khurd
- Kahoo Sharqi
- Kahoo Gharbi
