= Ugar Budruk =

- Village
- Location in Karnataka, India Ugar Budruk (India)
- Coordinates: 16.6481°N 74.7975°E
- Country: India
- State: Karnataka
- District: Belgaum
- Talukas: Athni

Population (2001)
  - Total: 9,770

Languages
  - Official: Kannada
- Time zone: UTC+5:30 (IST)
- Postal code: 591316

Ugar Budruk is a village in Athni, a taluk of Belgaum district in the southern state of Karnataka, India,naround 38 km from the city of Sangli, Maharashtra. Ugar comes under the Kagwad constituency.

== Demographics ==
As of 2001 India census, Ugar Budruk had a population of 9770 with 5072 males and 4698 females.

== See also ==
- Belgaum
- Districts of Karnataka
