= Pimpode Budruk =

Village in Maharashtra

- Village (ID 563617)
- Interactive map of Pimpode Budruk
- Country: India
- State: Maharashtra
- District: Satara

Population (2011)
  - Total: 6,253

Languages
  - Official: Marathi
- Time zone: UTC+5:30 (IST)
- Postal code: 415525
- Vehicle registration: MH-11
- Coastline: 0 kilometres (0 mi)

Pimpode Budruk is one of the largest villages in Koregaon in the Satara District of Maharashtra state of India. Its population is around 9,000. The village has temples dedicated to Bhairava, Ganapati, Hanuman, and Ghumai Devi.

== Schools ==
- Zilla parishad prathmik shala ( 1 -4)
- Yashvantrao Chavan Vidyalay ( 5-10)
- Bharat Vidya Mandir Wagholi (11th and 12th)
