= Bhattu Kalan =

- Town
- Location in Haryana, India Bhattu Kalan (India)
- Coordinates: 29°23′14″N 75°20′32″E
- Country: India
- State: Haryana
- District: Fatehabad

Languages
  - Official: Hindi
- Time zone: UTC+5:30 (IST)
- PIN: 125053
- Telephone code: 01667
- ISO 3166 code: IN-HR
- Vehicle registration: HR
- Nearest city: Fatehabad
- Sex ratio: 1000:900 ♂/♀
- Literacy: 90%
- Lok Sabha constituency: Fatehabad and Adampur
- Website: haryana.gov.in

Bhattu Kalan is a town in Fatehabad district of Haryana, India.

It falls under the Hisar Division and is located 57 kilometres north from Hisar. It lies about 239 kilometres (149 mi) northwest of the capital, Delhi. The total area is 100 square kilometres (39 sq mi) and it is 203 metres (666 ft) above sea level.

== See also ==
- Bhatti
- Bhattiana
- List of villages in Fatehabad district
