= List of towns in Delhi by population =

The National Capital Territory of Delhi (NCT) in the National Capital Region is a special union territory of India jointly administered by the Central government, the NCT elected government and three municipal corporations. The metropolis of Delhi and the National Capital Territory of Delhi are coextensive and for most practical purposes they are considered to be the same entity.

Following is a list of towns recognized under the territory by census of India.

Name	Status	District	Population (2011)	Population (2001)	Population (1991)
Aali	Census town	South	33,123	27,169	20,590
Ali Pur	Census town	North West	20,332	16,631	9,256
Asola	Census town	South	13,275	5,003	5,061
Aya Nagar	Census town	South	33,123	—	—
Babar Pur	Census town	North East	37,058	43,375	47,451
Bakhtawar Pur	Census town	North West	12,716	9,731	—
Bakkar Wala	Census town	West	18,122	—	—
Bankauli	Census town	North West	5,339	4,555	—
Bankner	Census town	North West	14,788	21,089	—
Bapraula	Census town	West	52,744	—	—
Baqiabad	Census town	North East	14,429	12,058	—
Barwala	Census town	North West	8,948	6,462	—
Bawana	Census town	North West	73,680	23,094	18,999
Begum Pur	Census town	North West	53,682	22,839	—
Bhalswa Jahangir Pur	Census town	North West	197,148	152,339	95,065
Bhati	Census town	South	18,864	15,888	—
Bhor Garh	Census town	North West	8,627	5,562	—
Burari	Census town	North	146,190	69,333	—
Chandan Hola	Census town	South	6,780	5,484	—
Chattar Pur	Census town	South	46,776	25,354	—
Chhawala (Chhawla)	Census town	South West	14,662	9,047	—
Chilla Saroda Bangar	Census town	East	83,217	66,700	—
Chilla Saroda Khadar	Census town	East	11,743	9,201	—
Dallo Pura	Census town	East	154,791	132,621	—
Darya Pur Kalan	Census town	North West	6,310	5,057	—
Dayal Pur	Census town	North East	20,589	13,009	—
Delhi Municipal Corporation	Municipal corporation	—	11,034,555	9,879,172	7,206,704
Delhi Cantonment	Cantonment board	—	110,351	124,917	94,393
Deoli	Census town	South	169,122	33,214	—
Dera Mandi	Census town	South	16,725	—	—
Dindar Pur	Census town	South West	35,856	—	—
Fateh Pur Beri	Census town	South	8,861	—	—
Gharoli	Census town	East	92,540	69,444	—
Gharonda Neemka Bangar (Patparganj)	Census town	East	37,876	34,412	22,945
Gheora	Census town	North West	6,876	5,917	—
Ghitorni	Census town	South West	14,893	9,152	6,254
Gokal Pur	Census town	North East	121,870	91,159	49,186
Hastsal	Census town	West	176,877	86,556	—
Ibrahim Pur	Census town	North West	10,614	6,542	—
Jaffar Pur Kalan	Census town	South West	6,573	5,065	—
Jaffrabad	Census town	North East	54,601	57,450	17,492
Jait Pur	Census town	South	59,330	—	—
Jharoda Kalan	Census town	South West	19,578	14,774	—
Jharoda Majra Burari	Census town	North	22,878	13,302	—
Jiwan Pur (Johri Pur)	Census town	North East	43,054	20,770	—
Jona Pur	Census town	South	10,635	7,419	—
Kair	Census town	South West	4,074	4,008	—
Kamal Pur Majra Burari	Census town	North	43,086	—	—
Kanjhawala	Census town	North West	10,331	8,700	6,100
Kapas Hera	Census town	South West	74,073	21,617	—
Karala	Census town	North West	35,730	19,100	—
Karawal Nagar	Census town	North East	224,281	148,624	—
Khajoori Khas	Census town	North East	76,640	45,087	—
Khan Pur Dhani	Census town	North East	6,994	—	—
Khera	Census town	South West	7,220	6,208	—
Khera Kalan	Census town	North West	8,252	6,690	—
Khera Khurd	Census town	North West	9,777	8,817	—
Kirari Suleman Nagar	Census town	North West	283,211	154,633	—
Kondli	Census town	East	38,207	28,576	—
Kotla Mahigiran	Census town	South	7,376	6,273	—
Kusum Pur	Census town	South West	17,028	15,372	—
Lad Pur	Census town	North West	5,529	4,601	—
Libas Pur	Census town	North West	44,375	27,940	—
Maidan Garhi	Census town	South	11,111	8,159	—
Malik Pur Kohi (Rang Puri)	Census town	South West	23,726	19,297	—
Mandoli	Census town	North East	120,417	103,165	—
Mir Pur Turk	Census town	North East	19,098	28,258	—
Mithe Pur	Census town	South	69,837	40,642	—
Mitraon	Census town	South West	6,512	4,876	—
Mohammad Pur Majri	Census town	North West	17,462	10,073	—
Molar Band	Census town	South	91,402	40,524	19,629
Moradabad Pahari	Census town	South West	21,502	—	—
Mubarak Pur Dabas	Census town	North West	12,043	11,296	—
Mukand Pur	Census town	North	57,135	—	—
Mukhmel Pur	Census town	North West	4,931	4,736	—
Mundka	Census town	West	54,541	43,873	8,598
Mustafabad	Census town	North East	127,167	90,171	—
Nangli Sakrawati	Census town	South West	37,706	21,873	—
Nangloi Jat	Census town	West	205,596	150,948	76,063
Neb Sarai	Census town	South	15,640	11,541	—
New Delhi Municipal Corporation	Municipal corporation	—	257,803	302,363	301,297
Nilothi	Census town	West	43,371	22,888	—
Nithari	Census town	North West	50,464	35,025	—
Pehlad Pur Bangar	Census town	North West	22,968	10,554	4,832
Pooth Kalan	Census town	North West	96,002	50,596	—
Pooth Khurd	Census town	North West	10,654	8,164	8,293
Pul Pehlad	Census town	South	69,657	52,856	14,343
Qadi Pur	Census town	North West	18,369	—	—
Quammruddin Nagar	Census town	West	25,126	10,235	—
Qutab Garh	Census town	North West	7,639	6,304	—
Raja Pur Khurd	Census town	West	19,312	9,712	—
Rajokri	Census town	South West	19,148	12,761	11,766
Raj Pur Khurd	Census town	South	11,161	6,209	—
Rani Khera	Census town	North West	16,402	—	—
Roshan Pura (Dichaon Khurd)	Census town	South West	57,217	38,581	13,870
Sadat Pur Gujran	Census town	North East	97,641	43,221	—
Sahibabad Daulat Pur	Census town	North West	54,773	35,980	—
Saidabad	Census town	South	10,168	9,520	—
Saidul Azaib	Census town	South	17,914	14,080	—
Sambhalka	Census town	South West	17,076	11,061	—
Shafi Pur Ranhola	Census town	West	31,944	—	—
Shakar Pur Baramad	Census town	East	1,178	—	—
Siras Pur	Census town	North West	30,445	15,043	—
Sultan Pur	Census town	South	15,160	11,364	8,365
Sultan Pur Majra	Census town	North West	181,554	164,426	111,567
Taj Pul	Census town	South	68,796	59,643	5,882
Tigri	Census town	South	46,974	44,897	34,416
Tikri Kalan	Census town	West	16,313	14,191	—
Tikri Khurd	Census town	North West	13,772	8,637	—
Tilang Pur Kotla	Census town	West	13,614	7,068	—
Tukhmir Pur	Census town	North East	5,658	4,847	—
Ujwa	Census town	South West	4,856	4,273	—
Ziauddin Pur	Census town	North East	68,993	48,043	—

Town	Population (2001)	Population (2011)
Delhi	9,817,439	
Najafgarh	1,365,500	
Narela	501,511	
New Delhi	294,783	
Sultanpur Majra	163,716	
Kirari Suleman Nagar	153,874	
Bhalswa Jahangir Pur	151,427	
Muzzafarnagar		
Nangloi	150,371	205,596
Karawal Nagar	148,549	
Dallo Pura	132,628	
Delhi Cantonment	124,452	
Deoli	119,432	
Gokal Pur	90,564	
Mustafabad	89,117	
Hastsal	85,848	
Burari	69,182	
Gharoli	68,978	
Chilla Saroda Bangar	65,969	
Taj Pul	58,220	
Jaffrabad	57,460	
Puth Kalan	50,587	
Mandoli	103,165	120,417
