= List of cities in Delhi by population =

The constituent parts of the National Capital Territory of Delhi form an urban agglomeration. In the census of India 2011, an urban agglomeration (UA) was defined as follows:

"An urban agglomeration is a continuous urban spread constituting a town and its adjoining outgrowths (OGs), or two or more physically contiguous towns together with or without outgrowths of such towns. An Urban Agglomeration must consist of at least a statutory town and its total population (i.e. all the constituents put together) should not be less than 20,000 as per the 2001 Census. In varying local conditions, there were similar other combinations which have been treated as urban agglomerations satisfying the basic condition of contiguity."

== Delhi urban agglomeration constituents ==
This is a list of towns and cities that are constituent parts of the urban agglomeration (UA) of Delhi, a union territory of India. All have a population greater than 100,000, as counted in the 2011 census of India.

| Rank | Name | District | Type* | Population 2011 | Male | Female | Population below 5 yrs | Literacy rate |
|---|---|---|---|---|---|---|---|---|
| 1 | New Delhi | New Delhi | UA | 16,314,838 | 8,739,213 | 7,575,625 | 1,912,253 | 86.43 |
* UA=urban agglomeration

=== Non-city constituents ===
The urban agglomeration (UA) of Delhi has 113 constituent parts, as identified by the Directorate of Census Operations, for the 2011 census of India. Of these, 100 are defined as towns for census purposes, which may be categorised as municipal corporations, municipal councils, cantonment boards, census towns, or out growths; and 13 are cities. These, all with a population of 1 lakh or more, are noted below:

==== Census towns ====
- Aali
- Alipur
- Asola
- Aya Nagar
- Babarpur
- Bakhtawarpur
- Bakkar Wala
- Bankauli
- Bankner
- Bapraula
- Baqiabad
- Barwala
- Bawana
- Begum Pur
- Bhalswa Jahangirpur
- Bhati
- Bhor Garh
- Burari
- Chandan Hola
- Chattarpur
- Chhawala
- Chilla Saroda Bangar
- Chilla Saroda Khadar
- Daryapur Kalan
- Dayalpur
- Dallopura
- Dindarpur
- Deoli
- Dera Mandi
- Fatehpur Beri
- Gharonda Neemka Bangar (also known as Patparganj)
- Gharoli
- Gheora
- Gokalpur
- Ghitorni
- Hastsal
- Holambi kalan
- Holambi khurd
- Ibrahimpur
- Jaitpur
- Jiwanpur (also called Johripur)
- Jaffrabad
- Jharoda Kalan
- Jonapur
- Jharoda Majra Burari
- Kanjhawala
- Kamalpur Majra Burari
- Kapas Hera
- Karala
- Karawal Nagar
- Kair
- Khanpur Dhani
- Khajoori Khas
- Khera
- Khera Kalan
- Khera Khurd
- Kirari Suleman Nagar
- Kondli
- Kotla Mahigiran
- Kusumpur
- Ladpur
- Libaspur
- Maidan Garhi
- Mehrauli
- Mukhmelpur
- Moradabad Pahari
- Malikpur Kohi alias Rangpuri
- Mithepur
- Molarband
- Mirpur Turk
- Mubarak Pur Dabas
- Mustafabad
- Mohammad Pur Majri
- Mandoli
- Mukandpur
- Mundka
- Mitraon
- Nilothi
- Nangloi Jat
- Nithari
- Neb Sarai
- Nangli Sakrawati
- Pooth Kalan
- Pooth Khurd
- Pul Pehlad
- Prahlad Pur Bangar
- Qadipur
- Quammruddin Nagar
- Rajapur Khurd
- Rajokri
- Rani Khera
- Roshanpura (also called Dichaon Khurd)
- Sultanpur Majra
- Saidabad
- Shakarpur Baramad
- Sadatpur Gujran
- Siraspur
- Sahibabad Daulatpur
- Shafipur Ranhola
- Tikri Kalan
- Sambhalka
- Sultanpur
- Saidul Azaib
- Taj Pul
- Tukhmirpur
- Tilangpur Kotla
- Tigri
- Tikri Khurd
- Ziauddinpur

==== Cantonment boards ====
- Delhi Cantonment

==== Out growths ====
- Nil

==== Municipal corporations ====
- Delhi Municipal Corporation

==== Municipal councils ====
- New Delhi (NDMC)

=== Constituents with city status ===
Constituents of the Delhi UA which are classified as cities, all with a population greater than 100,000, as per the 2011 census, are shown in the table below.

| Urban agglomeration | Name of constituent | District | Type* | Population 2011 | Male | Female | Population below 5 yrs | Literacy rate |
|---|---|---|---|---|---|---|---|---|
| Delhi | Delhi Municipal Corporation | - | M Corp | 11,007,835 | 5,871,362 | 5,136,473 | 1,209,275 | 87.60 |
| | New Delhi Municipal Council | - | M Cl | 249,998 | 136,438 | 113,560 | 20,857 | 90.93 |
| | Kirari Suleman Nagar | North West Delhi | CT | 282,598 | 152,135 | 130,463 | 40,720 | 79.22 |
| | Sultan Pur Majra | North West Delhi | CT | 181,624 | 95,816 | 85,808 | 24,254 | 79.78 |
| | Bhalswa Jahangir Pur | North West Delhi | CT | 197,150 | 106,271 | 90,879 | 27,653 | 76.94 |
| | Burari | North Delhi | CT | 145,584 | 77,767 | 67,817 | 18,134 | 81.94 |
| | Karawal Nagar | North East Delhi | CT | 224,666 | 120,284 | 104,382 | 30,985 | 84.57 |
| | Mustafabad | North East Delhi | CT | 127,012 | 66,754 | 60,258 | 19,370 | 76.10 |
| | Gokal Pur | North East Delhi | CT | 121,938 | 64,935 | 57,003 | 15,299 | 85.24 |
| | Mandoli | | CT | 120,345 | 64,123 | 56,222 | 16,212 | 80.72 |
| | Dallo Pura | East Delhi | CT | 154,955 | 66,754 | 81,425 | 73,530 | 81.92 |
| | Hastsal | West Delhi | CT | 177,033 | 95,068 | 81,965 | 23,920 | 84.68 |
| | Nangloi Jat | West Delhi | CT | 205,497 | 110,068 | 95,429 | 28,274 | 83.40 |
| | Delhi Cantonment | South West Delhi | CB | 116,352 | 67,703 | 48,649 | 13,214 | 91.11 |
| | Deoli | South Delhi | CT | 169,410 | 91,173 | 78,237 | 22,526 | 83.85 |

Abbreviations: M Corp. = municipal corporation, M = municipality, CT = census town, OG = out growth, NA = notified area, CB = cantonment board
