= List of towns and cities with 100,000 or more inhabitants/country: G-H-I-J-K =

This is a list of towns and cities in the world believed to have 100,000 or more inhabitants, sorted by countries beginning with letters between G and K. Unless otherwise noted, populations are based on United Nations estimates from 2022.

Index

A-B • C-D-E-F • G-H-I-J-K • L-M-N-O • P-Q-R-S • T-U-V-W-Y-Z
Back to main page

== Gabon ==
City	Province	Population (2013)
Libreville	Estuaire	703,940
Port-Gentil	Ogooué-Maritime	136,462
Franceville	Haut-Ogooué	110,568

== Georgia ==
City	Region	Population (2023)
Tbilisi	Tbilisi	1,241,709
Batumi	Adjara	179,185
Rustavi	Kvemo Kartli	132,333
Kutaisi	Imereti	130,411

== Germany ==
City	State	Population (2016)
Aachen	North Rhine-Westphalia	245,900
Augsburg	Bavaria	286,400
Bergisch Gladbach	North Rhine-Westphalia	111,400
Berlin	Berlin	3,520,000
Bielefeld	North Rhine-Westphalia	333,000
Bochum	North Rhine-Westphalia	364,700
Bonn	North Rhine-Westphalia	318,800
Bottrop	North Rhine-Westphalia	117,100
Braunschweig	Lower Saxony	251,400
Bremen	Bremen	557,500
Bremerhaven	Bremen	114,000
Chemnitz	Saxony	248,600
Cologne	North Rhine-Westphalia	1,060,600
Darmstadt	Hesse	155,400
Dortmund	North Rhine-Westphalia	586,200
Dresden	Saxony	543,800
Duisburg	North Rhine-Westphalia	491,200
Düsseldorf	North Rhine-Westphalia	612,200
Erfurt	Thuringia	210,100
Erlangen	Bavaria	108,300
Essen	North Rhine-Westphalia	582,600
Frankfurt	Hesse	732,700
Freiburg im Breisgau	Baden-Württemberg	226,400
Fürth	Bavaria	124,200
Gelsenkirchen	North Rhine-Westphalia	260,400
Göttingen	Lower Saxony	119,000
Hagen	North Rhine-Westphalia	189,000
Halle	Saxony-Anhalt	237,000
Hamburg	Hamburg	1,747,400
Hamm	North Rhine-Westphalia	179,400
Hanover	Lower Saxony	532,200
Heidelberg	Baden-Württemberg	156,300
Heilbronn	Baden-Württemberg	122,600
Herne	North Rhine-Westphalia	155,900
Hildesheim	Lower Saxony	101,700
Ingolstadt	Bavaria	132,400
Jena	Thuringia	109,500
Karlsruhe	Baden-Württemberg	307,800
Kassel	Hesse	198,000
Kiel	Schleswig-Holstein	246,300
Koblenz	Rhineland-Palatinate	112,600
Krefeld	North Rhine-Westphalia	225,100
Leipzig	Saxony	560,500
Leverkusen	North Rhine-Westphalia	163,500
Lübeck	Schleswig-Holstein	216,300
Ludwigshafen	Rhineland-Palatinate	164,700
Magdeburg	Saxony-Anhalt	235,700
Mainz	Rhineland-Palatinate	209,800
Mannheim	Baden-Württemberg	305,800
Moers	North Rhine-Westphalia	104,500
Mönchengladbach	North Rhine-Westphalia	260,000
Mülheim	North Rhine-Westphalia	169,300
Munich	Bavaria	1,450,400
Münster	North Rhine-Westphalia	310,000
Neuss	North Rhine-Westphalia	155,400
Nuremberg	Bavaria	510,000
Oberhausen	North Rhine-Westphalia	211,000
Offenbach am Main	Hesse	211,000
Oldenburg	Lower Saxony	163,800
Osnabrück	Lower Saxony	162,400
Paderborn	North Rhine-Westphalia	148,100
Pforzheim	Baden-Württemberg	122,200
Potsdam	Brandenburg	167,700
Recklinghausen	North Rhine-Westphalia	114,300
Regensburg	Bavaria	145,500
Remscheid	North Rhine-Westphalia	109,500
Reutlingen	Baden-Württemberg	114,310
Rostock	Mecklenburg-Vorpommern	206,000
Saarbrücken	Saarland	178,200
Salzgitter	Lower Saxony	101,100
Siegen	North Rhine-Westphalia	102,400
Solingen	North Rhine-Westphalia	158,700
Stuttgart	Baden-Württemberg	623,700
Trier	Rhineland-Palatinate	114,900
Ulm	Baden-Württemberg	122,636
Wiesbaden	Hesse	276,200
Wolfsburg	Lower Saxony	124,000
Wuppertal	North Rhine-Westphalia	350,000
Würzburg	Bavaria	124,900

== Ghana ==
City	Region	Population (2010)
Accra	Greater Accra	1,594,400
Ashaiman	Greater Accra	191,000
Koforidua	Eastern	122,300
Kumasi	Ashanti	1,730,200
Madina	Greater Accra	111,900
Obuasi	Ashanti	168,600
Tamale	Northern	223,300
Tema	Greater Accra	292,700

== Greece ==
City	Administrative region	Population (2021)
Athens	Attica	643,452
Patras	Western Greece	169,886
Heraklion	Crete	145,440
Larissa	Thessaly	146,377
Piraeus	Attica	168,151
Volos	Thessaly	139,670
Peristeri	Attica	133,630
Thessaloniki	Central Macedonia	309,617

== Guatemala ==
City	Department	Population (2001)
Ciudad de Guatemala	Guatemala	1,022,000
Escuintla	Escuintla	114,600
Mixco	Guatemala	452,100
Quetzaltenango	Quetzaltenango	152,200
Villa Nueva	Guatemala	390,300

== Guinea ==
City	Region	Population (2014)
Conakry	Conakry	1,660,973
Nzérékoré	Nzérékoré	195,027
Kankan	Kankan	190,722
Manéah	Kindia	167,354
Dubréka	Kindia	157,017
Kindia	Kindia	138,695
Siguiri	Kankan	127,492

== Guinea-Bissau ==
City	Region	Population (2009)
Bissau	Bissau	387,909

== Guyana ==
City	Region	Population (2012)
Georgetown	Demerara-Mahaica	118,369

== Haiti ==
City	Department	Population (1999)
Cap-Haitien	Nord	113,600
Carrefour	Ouest	336,200
Delmas	Ouest	284,100
Port-au-Prince	Ouest	990,600

== Honduras ==
City	Department	Population (2013)
Catacamas	Olancho	117,500
Choloma	Cortés	231,700
Choluteca	Choluteca	152,500
Comayagua	Comayagua	144,800
Danlí	El Paraíso	195,900
El Progreso	Yoro	188,400
Juticalpa	Olancho	124,800
La Ceiba	Atlántida	197,300
Olanchito	Yoro	104,600
Puerto Cortés	Cortés	122,400
San Pedro Sula	Cortés	719,100
Tegucigalpa	Francisco Morazán	1,157,500
Villanueva	Cortés	150,000

== Hungary ==
City	Region	Population (2023)
Budapest	Central Hungary	1,671,004
Debrecen	Northern Great Plain	201,582
Győr	Western Transdanubia	130,020
Kecskemét	Southern Great Plain	109,731
Miskolc	Northern Hungary	145,248
Nyíregyháza	Northern Great Plain	115,711
Pécs	Southern Transdanubia	141,031
Szeged	Southern Great Plain	158,829

== Iceland ==
City	Region	Population (2024)
Reykjavík	Capital	136,894

== India ==
City	State / Union Territory	Population (2011)
Abohar	Punjab	145,300
Achalpur	Maharashtra	112,300
Adilabad	Telangana	117,200
Adityapur	Jharkhand	174,400
Adoni	Andhra Pradesh	184,600
Agartala	Tripura	400,000
Agra	Uttar Pradesh	1,585,700
Ahmadabad	Gujarat	5,633,900
Ahmadnagar	Maharashtra	350,900
Aizawl	Mizoram	293,400
Ajmer	Rajasthan	542,300
Akbarpur	Uttar Pradesh	111,400
Akola	Maharashtra	425,800
Alandur	Tamil Nadu	164,400
Alappuzha	Kerala	174,164
Aligarh	Uttar Pradesh	874,400
Allahabad	Uttar Pradesh	1,168,400
Alwar	Rajasthan	322,600
Ambala	Haryana	195,100
Ambala Sadar	Haryana	105,000
Ambarnath	Maharashtra	253,500
Ambattur	Tamil Nadu	466,200
Ambikapur	Chhattisgarh	121,000
Ambur	Tamil Nadu	114,600
Amravati	Maharashtra	647,100
Amreli	Gujarat	118,000
Amritsar	Punjab	1,159,200
Amroha	Uttar Pradesh	198,500
Anand	Gujarat	209,400
Anantapur	Andhra Pradesh	267,200
Anantnag	Jammu and Kashmir	150,600
Arrah	Bihar	261,400
Asansol	West Bengal	563,900
Ashoknagar Kalyangarh	West Bengal	121,600
Aurangabad, Bihar	Bihar	102,200
Aurangabad, Maharashtra	Maharashtra	1,175,100
Avadi	Tamil Nadu	346,000
Azamgarh	Uttar Pradesh	111,000
Badlapur	Maharashtra	174,200
Bagaha	Bihar	112,600
Bagalkot	Karnataka	111,900
Bahadurgarh	Haryana	170,800
Baharampur	West Bengal	195,200
Bahraich	Uttar Pradesh	186,200
Baidyabati	West Bengal	121,100
Baleshwar	Odisha	144,300
Ballia	Uttar Pradesh	104,400
Bally	West Bengal	113,000
Balurghat	West Bengal	153,300
Banda	Uttar Pradesh	160,500
Bankura	West Bengal	137,400
Bansberia	West Bengal	103,900
Banswara	Rajasthan	101,000
Baran	Rajasthan	118,000
Baranagar	West Bengal	245,200
Barasat	West Bengal	278,400
Baraut	Uttar Pradesh	103,800
Barddhaman	West Bengal	314,300
Bareilly	Uttar Pradesh	904,800
Baripada	Odisha	116,800
Barnala	Punjab	116,400
Barrackpur	West Bengal	152,800
Barshi	Maharashtra	118,700
Basirhat	West Bengal	125,300
Basti	Uttar Pradesh	114,700
Batala	Punjab	158,600
Bathinda	Punjab	285,800
Beawar	Rajasthan	151,200
Begusarai	Bihar	252,000
Belgaum	Karnataka	490,000
Bellary	Karnataka	410,400
Bettiah	Bihar	132,200
Betul	Madhya Pradesh	103,300
Bhadrak	Odisha	121,300
Bhadravati	Karnataka	151,000
Bhadreswar	West Bengal	101,500
Bhagalpur	Bihar	400,100
Bhalswa Jahangir Pur	Delhi	197,100
Bharatpur	Rajasthan	252,800
Bharuch	Gujarat	169,000
Bhatpara	West Bengal	386,019
Bhavnagar	Gujarat	605,900
Bhilai Nagar	Chhattisgarh	627,700
Bhilwara	Rajasthan	359,500
Bhilmavaram	Andhra Pradesh	147,000
Bhind	Madhya Pradesh	197,600
Bhiwadi	Rajasthan	104,900
Bhiwandi	Maharashtra	709,700
Bhiwani	Haryana	196,100
Bhopal	Madhya Pradesh	1,798,200
Bhubaneswar	Odisha	885,400
Bhuj	Gujarat	148,800
Bhusawal	Maharashtra	187,400
Bid	Maharashtra	146,700
Bidar	Karnataka	216,000
Bidhan Nagar	West Bengal	215,500
Biharsharif	Bihar	297,300
Bijapur	Karnataka	327,400
Bikaner	Rajasthan	644,400
Bilaspur	Chhattisgarh	365,600
Bokaro Steel City	Jharkhand	414,800
Bongaon	West Bengal	108,900
Botad	Gujarat	130,300
Brahmapur	Odisha	356,600
Bangalore	Karnataka	8,495,500
Budaun	Uttar Pradesh	159,300
Bulandshahar	Uttar Pradesh	230,000
Bundi	Rajasthan	104,900
Burari	Delhi	146,200
Burhanpur	Madhya Pradesh	210,900
Buxar	Bihar	102,900
Champdani	West Bengal	111,300
Chandannagar	West Bengal	166,900
Chandausi	Uttar Pradesh	114,400
Chandigarh	Chandigarh	970,600
Chandrapur	Maharashtra	320,400
Chapra	West Bengal	202,400
Chas	Jharkhand	141,600
Chennai	Tamil Nadu	4,646,700
Chhatarpur	Madhya Pradesh	142,100
Chhindwara	Madhya Pradesh	175,100
Chilakaluripet	Andhra Pradesh	101,400
Chitradurga	Karnataka	145,900
Chittaurgarh	Rajasthan	116,400
Chittoor	Andhra Pradesh	160,700
Churu	Rajasthan	120,200
Coimbatore	Tamil Nadu	1,050,700
Cuddalore	Tamil Nadu	173,600
Cuttack	Odisha	610,200
Dabgram	West Bengal	119,000
Dallo Pura	Delhi	154,800
Damoh	Madhya Pradesh	139,600
Darbhanga	Bihar	296,000
Darjiling	West Bengal	118,800
Datia	Madhya Pradesh	100,300
Davanagere	Karnataka	435,000
Deesa	Gujarat	111,200
Dehradun	Uttarakhand	574,800
Dehri	Bihar	137,200
Delhi Cantonment	Delhi	110,400
Delhi	Delhi	11,034,600
Deoghar	Jharkhand	203,100
Deoli	Rajasthan	169,100
Deoria	Uttar Pradesh	129,400
Dewas	Madhya Pradesh	289,600
Dhamtari	Chhattisgarh	101,700
Dhanbad	Jharkhand	1,162,500
Dharmavaram	Andhra Pradesh	121,900
Dhaulpur	Rajasthan	133,100
Dhule	Maharashtra	375,600
Dibrugarh	Assam	145,500
Dimapur	Nagaland	122,800
Dinapur Nizamat	Bihar	182,400
Dindigul	Tamil Nadu	207,300
Dohad	Gujarat	118,800
Dum Dum	West Bengal	114,800
Durg	Chhattisgarh	268,800
Durgapur	West Bengal	566,500
Eluru	Andhra Pradesh	218,000
English Bazar	West Bengal	205,500
Erode	Tamil Nadu	157,100
Etah	Uttar Pradesh	118,500
Etawah	Uttar Pradesh	256,800
Faizabad	Uttar Pradesh	165,200
Faridabad	Haryana	1,414,100
Farrukhabad-cum-Fatehgarh	Uttar Pradesh	276,600
Fatehpur	Uttar Pradesh	193,200
Firozabad	Uttar Pradesh	604,200
Firozpur	Punjab	110,300
Gadag-Betigeri	Karnataka	172,600
Gandhidham	Gujarat	248,000
Gandhinagar	Gujarat	292,800
Ganganagar	Rajasthan	237,800
Gangapur City	Rajasthan	119,100
Gangawati	Karnataka	114,600
Gangtok	Sikkim	100,300
Gaya	Bihar	474,100
Ghaziabad	Uttar Pradesh	1,648,600
Ghazipur	Uttar Pradesh	121,000
Giridih	Jharkhand	114,500
Godhra	Gujarat	143,600
Gokal Pur	Delhi	121,900
Gonda	Uttar Pradesh	114,000
Gondal	Gujarat	112,200
Gondiya	Maharashtra	132,800
Gorakhpur	Uttar Pradesh	673,400
Mumbai	Maharashtra	12,442,400
Greater Noida	Uttar Pradesh	102,100
Gudivada	Andhra Pradesh	118,200
Gulbarga	Karnataka	543,100
Guna	Madhya Pradesh	180,900
Guntakal	Andhra Pradesh	126,300
Guntur	Andhra Pradesh	670,100
Gurgaon	Haryana	886,500
Guwahati	Assam	962,300
Gwalior	Madhya Pradesh	1,054,400
Habra	West Bengal	147,200
Hajipur	Bihar	147,700
Haldia	West Bengal	200,800
Haldwani-cum-Kathgodam	Uttarakhand	201,500
Halisahar	West Bengal	124,900
Hanumangarh	Rajasthan	151,000
Haora	West Bengal	1,077,100
Hapur	Uttar Pradesh	263,000
Hardoi	Uttar Pradesh	197,000
Hardwar	Uttarakhand	231,300
Hassan	Karnataka	155,000
Hastsal	Delhi	176,900
Hathras	Uttar Pradesh	143,000
Hazaribag	Jharkhand	142,500
Hindaun	Rajasthan	105,500
Hindupur	Andhra Pradesh	151,700
Hinganghat	Maharashtra	101,800
Hisar	Haryana	307,000
Hoshangabad	Madhya Pradesh	118,000
Hoshiarpur	Punjab	168,700
Hospet	Karnataka	206,200
Hosur	Tamil Nadu	116,800
Hubli-Dharwad	Karnataka	943,800
Hugli-Chinsurah	West Bengal	179,900
Hyderabad	Telangana	6,993,300
Ichalkaranji	Maharashtra	287,400
Imphal	Manipur	277,200
Indore	Madhya Pradesh	1,994,400
Jabalpur	Madhya Pradesh	1,081,700
Jagadhri	Haryana	124,900
Jagdalpur	Chhattisgarh	125,500
Jagtial	Telangana	103,900
Jaipur	Rajasthan	3,046,200
Jalandhar	Punjab	868,900
Jalgaon	Maharashtra	460,200
Jalna	Maharashtra	285,600
Jalpaiguri	West Bengal	107,300
Jamalpur	Bihar	105,400
Jammu	Jammu and Kashmir	576,200
Jamnagar	Gujarat	600,900
Jamshedpur	Jharkhand	677,400
Jamuria	West Bengal	149,200
Jaunpur	Uttar Pradesh	180,400
Jehanabad	Bihar	103,200
Jetpur Navagadh	Gujarat	118,300
Jhansi	Uttar Pradesh	505,700
Jhunjhunun	Rajasthan	118,500
Jind	Haryana	167,600
Jodhpur	Rajasthan	1,056,200
Jorhat	Assam	126,700
Junagadh	Gujarat	319,500
Kadapa	Andhra Pradesh	344,900
Kaithal	Haryana	144,900
Kakinada	Andhra Pradesh	384,200
Kalol	Gujarat	134,400
Kalyan Dombivali	Maharashtra	1,247,300
Kalyani	West Bengal	100,600
Kamarhati	West Bengal	330,200
Kancheepuram	Tamil Nadu	164,400
Kanchrapara	West Bengal	129,600
Kannur	Kerala	232,486
Kanpur	Uttar Pradesh	2,768,100
Kanpur Cantonment	Uttar Pradesh	108,500
Karaikkudi	Tamil Nadu	106,700
Karawal Nagar	Delhi	224,300
Karimnagar	Telangana	289,800
Karnal	Haryana	302,100
Kasganj	Uttar Pradesh	101,300
Kashipur	Uttarakhand	121,600
Katihar	Bihar	240,800
Khammam	Telangana	196,300
Khandwa	Madhya Pradesh	200,700
Khanna	Punjab	128,100
Kharagpur	West Bengal	207,600
Khardaha	West Bengal	108,500
Khargone	Madhya Pradesh	116,200
Khora	Uttar Pradesh	190,000
Khurja	Uttar Pradesh	121,200
Kirari Suleman Nagar	Delhi	283,200
Kishanganj	Bihar	105,800
Kishangarh	Rajasthan	154,900
Kochi	Kerala	633,600
Kolar	Karnataka	138,500
Kolhapur	Maharashtra	549,200
Kolkata	West Bengal	4,496,700
Kollam	Kerala	367,100
Korba	Chhattisgarh	365,300
Kota	Rajasthan	1,001,700
Kottayam	Kerala	136,812
Kozhikode	Kerala	609,224
Krishnanagar	West Bengal	153,100
Kulti	West Bengal	313,800
Kumbakonam	Tamil Nadu	140,200
Kurichi	Tamil Nadu	123,700
Kurnool	Andhra Pradesh	457,600
Lakhimpur	Uttar Pradesh	152,000
Lalitpur	Uttar Pradesh	133,300
Latur	Maharashtra	382,900
Loni	Uttar Pradesh	516,100
Lucknow	Uttar Pradesh	2,817,100
Ludhiana	Punjab	1,618,900
Machilipatnam	Andhra Pradesh	169,900
Madanapalle	Andhra Pradesh	180,200
Madhavaram	Tamil Nadu	119,100
Madhyamgram	West Bengal	196,100
Madurai	Tamil Nadu	1,017,900
Mahbubnagar	Telangana	190,400
Mahesana	Gujarat	190,800
Maheshtala	West Bengal	448,300
Mainpuri	Uttar Pradesh	136,600
Malappuram	Kerala	101,400
Malegaon	Maharashtra	481,200
Malerkotia	Punjab	135,400
Mandoli	Delhi	120,400
Mandsaur	Madhya Pradesh	141,700
Mandya	Karnataka	137,400
Mangalagiri	Andhra Pradesh	107,200
Mangalore	Karnataka	499,500
Mango	Jharkhand	223,800
Mathura	Uttar Pradesh	349,900
Maunath Bhanjan	Uttar Pradesh	278,700
Medinipur	West Bengal	169,300
Meerut	Uttar Pradesh	1,305,400
Mira Bhayandar	Maharashtra	809,400
Miryalaguda	Telangana	104,900
Mirazpur-cum-Vindhyachal	Uttar Pradesh	234,900
Modinagar	Uttar Pradesh	130,300
Moga	Punjab	163,400
Moradabad	Uttar Pradesh	887,900
Morena	Madhya Pradesh	200,500
Morvi	Gujarat	210,500
Motihari	Bihar	126,200
Mughalsarai	Uttar Pradesh	109,700
Muktsar	Punjab	116,700
Munger	Bihar	213,300
Murwara (Katni)	Madhya Pradesh	221,900
Mustafabad	Delhi	127,200
Muzaffarnagar	Uttar Pradesh	392,800
Muzaffarpur	Bihar	354,500
Mysore	Karnataka	920,600
Nabadwip	West Bengal	125,500
Nadiad	Gujarat	225,100
Nagaon	Assam	121,600
Nagapattinam	Tamil Nadu	102,900
Nagaur	Rajasthan	105,200
Nagda	Madhya Pradesh	100,000
Nagercoli	Tamil Nadu	224,800
Nagpur	Maharashtra	2,405,700
Naihati	West Bengal	217,900
Nalgonda	Telangana	154,300
Nanded	Maharashtra	550,400
Nandurbar	Maharashtra	111,000
Nandyal	Andhra Pradesh	211,400
Nangloi Jat	Delhi	205,600
Narasaraopet	Andhra Pradesh	117,500
Nashik	Maharashtra	1,486,100
Navi Mumbai	Maharashtra	1,120,500
Navsari	Gujarat	171,100
Neemuch	Madhya Pradesh	128,600
Nellore	Andhra Pradesh	547,600
New Delhi	Delhi	257,800
Neyveli	Tamil Nadu	105,700
Nizamabad	Telangana	311,200
Noida	Uttar Pradesh	637,300
North Barrackpur	West Bengal	132,800
North Dum Dum	West Bengal	249,100
Ongole	Andhra Pradesh	208,300
Orai	Uttar Pradesh	190,600
Osmanabad	Maharashtra	111,800
Ozhukarai	Puducherry	300,100
Palakkad	Kerala	131,000
Palanpur	Gujarat	141,600
Pali	Rajasthan	230,100
Pallavaram	Tamil Nadu	234,000
Palwal	Haryana	131,900
Panchkula	Haryana	211,400
Panihati	West Bengal	377,300
Panipat	Haryana	296,000
Panvel	Maharashtra	180,000
Parbhani	Maharashtra	307,200
Patan	Gujarat	133,700
Pathankot	Punjab	156,300
Patiala	Punjab	446,200
Patna	Bihar	1,684,300
Pilibhit	Uttar Pradesh	128,000
Pimpri Chinchwad	Maharashtra	1,727,700
Pithampur	Madhya Pradesh	126,200
Porbandar	Gujarat	152,800
Port Blair	Andaman and Nicobar Islands	108,100
Proddatur	Andhra Pradesh	164,000
Puducherry	Puducherry	244,400
Pudukkottai	Tamil Nadu	117,600
Pune	Maharashtra	3,124,500
Puri	Odisha	200,600
Purnia	Bihar	282,200
Puruliya	West Bengal	121,100
Rae Bareli	Uttar Pradesh	191,300
Raichur	Karnataka	234,100
Raiganj	West Bengal	183,600
Raigarh	Chhattisgarh	150,000
Raipur	Chhattisgarh	1,027,300
Rajahmundry	Andhra Pradesh	376,300
Rajapalayam	Tamil Nadu	130,400
Rajarhat Gopalpur	West Bengal	402,800
Rajkot	Gujarat	1,323,400
Rajnandgaon	Chhattisgarh	163,100
Rajpur Sonarpur	West Bengal	424,400
Ramagundam	Telangana	243,000
Rampur	Uttar Pradesh	325,300
Ranchi	Jharkhand	1,073,400
Ranibennur	Karnataka	106,400
Raniganj	West Bengal	129,400
Ratlam	Madhya Pradesh	264,900
Raurkela Industrial Township	Odisha	216,400
Raurkela Town	Odisha	320,000
Rewa	Madhya Pradesh	235,700
Rewari	Haryana	143,000
Rishra	West Bengal	124,600
Robertson Pet	Karnataka	162,200
Rohtak	Haryana	372,300
Roorkee	Uttarakhand	118,200
Rudrapur	Uttarakhand	154,600
S.A.S. Nagar	Punjab	166,900
Sagar	Madhya Pradesh	274,600
Saharanpur	Uttar Pradesh	705,500
Saharsa	Bihar	156,500
Salem	Tamil Nadu	829,300
Sambalpur	Odisha	189,400
Sambhal	Uttar Pradesh	220,800
Sangli-Miraj Kupwad	Maharashtra	502,800
Santipur	West Bengal	151,800
Sasaram	Bihar	147,400
Satara	Maharashtra	120,200
Satna	Madhya Pradesh	283,000
Sawai Madhpour	Rajasthan	121,100
Secunderabad	Telangana	217,900
Sehore	Madhya Pradesh	109,110
Seoni	Madhya Pradesh	102,300
Serampore	West Bengal	181,800
Shahjahanpur	Uttar Pradesh	329,700
Shamli	Uttar Pradesh	107,300
Shikohabad	Uttar Pradesh	107,400
Shillong	Meghalaya	143,200
Shimla	Himachal Pradesh	169,600
Shimoga	Karnataka	322,700
Shivpuri	Madhya Pradesh	180,000
Sikar	Rajasthan	244,500
Silchar	Assam	178,900
Siliguri	West Bengal	513,300
Singrauli	Madhya Pradesh	220,300
Sirsa	Haryana	182,500
Sitapur	Uttar Pradesh	177,200
Siwan	Bihar	135,100
Solapur	Maharashtra	951,600
Sonipat	Haryana	289,300
South Dum Dum	West Bengal	403,300
Srikakulam	Andhra Pradesh	137,900
Srinagar	Jammu and Kashmir	1,206,400
Sujangarh	Rajasthan	101,500
Sultan Pur Majra	Delhi	181,600
Sultanpur	Punjab	107,600
Surat	Gujarat	4,501,600
Surendranagar Dudhrej	Gujarat	177,900
Suryapet	Telangana	106,800
Tadepelligudem	Andhra Pradesh	104,000
Tadpatri	Andhra Pradesh	108,200
Tambaram	Tamil Nadu	174,800
Tenali	Andhra Pradesh	164,900
Thane	Maharashtra	1,841,500
Thanesar	Haryana	155,200
Thanjavur	Tamil Nadu	222,900
Thiruvananthapuram	Kerala	788,300
Thoothkkudi	Tamil Nadu	237,800
Thrissur	Kerala	316,000
Tinsukia	Assam	116,300
Tiruchirappalli	Tamil Nadu	847,400
Tirunelveli	Tamil Nadu	473,600
Tirupati	Andhra Pradesh	295,300
Tiruppur	Tamil Nadu	444,400
Tiruvannamalai	Tamil Nadu	145,300
Tiruvottiyur	Tamil Nadu	249,400
Titagarh	West Bengal	116,500
Tonk	Rajasthan	165,300
Tumkur	Karnataka	302,100
Udaipur	Rajasthan	451,100
Udgir	Maharashtra	103,600
Udupi	Karnataka	145,000
Ujjain	Madhya Pradesh	515,200
Ulhasnagar	Maharashtra	506,100
Uluberia	West Bengal	235,300
Unnao	Uttar Pradesh	177,700
Uttarpara Kotrung	West Bengal	159,100
Vadodara	Gujarat	1,752,400
Valsad	Gujarat	139,800
Vapi	Gujarat	163,600
Varanasi	Uttar Pradesh	1,198,500
Vasai-Virar City	Maharashtra	1,222,400
Vellore	Tamil Nadu	185,800
Veraval	Gujarat	171,100
Vidisha	Madhya Pradesh	156,000
Vijayawada	Andhra Pradesh	1,143,200
Visakhapatnam	Andhra Pradesh	1,728,100
Vizianagaram	Andhra Pradesh	228,700
Warangal	Telangana	704,600
Wardha	Maharashtra	106,400
Yamunanagar	Haryana	217,100
Yavatmal	Maharashtra	116,600

== Indonesia ==
City	Province	Population (2016)
Ambon	Maluku	444,800
Balikpapan	East Kalimantan	636,000
Banda Aceh	Aceh	259,900
Bandar Lampung	Lampung	1,015,900
Banjarmasin	South Kalimantan	692,800
Bandung	West Java	2,497,900
Banjar	West Java	200,973
Banjarbaru	South Kalimantan	253,442
Banjarmasin	South Kalimantan	657,663
Batam	Riau Islands	1,283,200
Batu	East Java	213,046
Bau-Bau	Southeast Sulawesi	159,248
Bekasi	West Java	2,543,676
Bengkulu	Bengkulu	368,100
Bima	West Nusa Tenggara	155,140
Binjai	North Sumatra	270,900
Bitung	North Sulawesi	212,400
Blitar	East Java	134,000
Bogor	West Java	178,917
Bontang	East Kalimantan	140,787
Bukittinggi	West Sumatra	121,028
Cilegon	Banten	434,896
Cimahi	West Java	568,400
Cirebon	West Java	313,300
Denpasar	Bali	914,300
Depok	West Java	2,056,335
Dumai	Riau	316,782
Gorontalo	Gorontalo	210,800
Gunungsitoli	North Sumatra	136,017
Jakarta	Jakarta Special Capital Region	10,374,200
Jambi	Jambi	591,100
Jayapura	Papua	293,700
Kediri	East Java	284,000
Kendari	Southeast Sulawesi	345,107
Kotamobagu	North Sulawesi	123,722
Kupang	East Nusa Tenggara	442,758
Langsa	Aceh	185,971
Lhokseumawe	Aceh	188,713
Lubuklinggau	South Sumatra	234,166
Madiun	East Java	176,100
Magelang	Central Java	121,500
Makasar	South Sulawesi	1,489,000
Malang	East Java	861,400
Manado	North Sulawesi	430,100
Mataram	West Nusa Tenggara	468,500
Medan	North Sumatra	2,247,400
Metro	Lampung	145,346
Mojokerto	East Java	168,676
Padang	West Sumatra	927,000
Padang Sidempuan	North Sumatra	225,105
Pagar Alam	South Sumatra	143,844
Palangkaraya	Central Kalimantan	275,700
Palembang	South Sumatra	1,623,100
Palopo	South Sulawesi	184,681
Palu	Central Sulawesi	373,218
Pangkal Pinang	Bangka Belitung Islands	204,400
Pare Pare	South Sulawesi	142,100
Pasuruan	East Java	197,700
Payakumbuh	West Sumatra	139,576
Pekalongan	Central Java	301,900
Pekanbaru	Riau	1,091,100
Pematang Siantar	North Sumatra	251,500
Pontianak	West Kalimantan	627,000
Prabumulih	South Sumatra	193,196
Probolinggo	East Java	233,100
Purwakarta	West Java	179,233
Salatiga	Central Java	188,900
Samarinda	East Kalimantan	843,400
Semarang	Central Java	1,757,700
Serang	Banten	692,101
Singkawang	West Kalimantan	235,064
Sukabumi	West Java	323,800
Surabaya	East Java	2,874,700
Surakarta	Central Java	516,100
Sorong	Southwest Papua	284,410
South Tangerang	Banten	1,354,350
Tangerang	Banten	2,139,900
Tanjung Balai	North Sumatra	171,200
Tanjungpinang	Riau Islands	227,663
Tarakan	North Kalimantan	242,786
Tasikmalaya	West Java	716,155
Tebing Tinggi	North Sumatra	160,700
Tegal	Central Java	248,100
Ternate	North Maluku	205,001
Tidore	North Maluku	114,480
Tomohon	North Sulawesi	100,587
Yogyakarta	Special Region of Yogyakarta	422,700

== Iran ==
City	Province	Population (2011)
Abadan	Khuzestan	212,700
Ahwaz	Khuzestan	1,112,000
Amol	Mazandaran	219,900
Andimeshk	Khuzestan	126,800
Arak	Markazi	484,200
Ardabil	Ardabil	482,600
Babol	Mazandaran	219,500
Bandar-e-Abbas	Hormozgan	435,800
Bandar-e-Anzali	Gilan	116,700
Bandar-e-Mahshahr	Khuzestan	153,800
Behbahan	Khuzestan	107,400
Birjand	South Khorasan	178,000
Bojnurd	North Khorasan	199,800
Borujerd	Lorestan	240,700
Bukan	West Azerbaijan	170,600
Bushehr	Bushehr	195,200
Dezful	Khuzestan	248,400
Esfahan	Isfahan	1,756,100
Fasa	Fars	104,800
Golestan	Tehran	259,500
Gonbad-e-Kavus	Golestan	144,500
Gorgan	Golestan	329,500
Hamadan	Hamadan	525,800
Ilam	Ilam	172,200
Islam Shahr	Tehran	389,100
Izeh	Khuzestan	117,100
Jahrom	Fars	114,100
Jiroft	Kerman	111,000
Kamal Shahr	Alborz	109,900
Karaj	Alborz	1,614,600
Kashan	Isfahan	275,300
Kerman	Kerman	534,400
Kermanshah	Kermanshah	851,400
Khomeini Shahr	Isfahan	244,700
Khoramabad	Lorestan	348,200
Khoramshahr	Khuzestan	129,400
Khoy	West Azerbaijan	201,000
Mahabad	West Azerbaijan	147,300
Malard	Tehran	290,800
Malayer	Hamadan	159,800
Marand	East Azerbaijan	124,300
Maraqeh	East Azerbaijan	162,300
Marvdasht	Fars	138,600
Mashhad	Razavi Khorasan	2,766,300
Masjed Soleyman	Khuzestan	103,400
Miandoab	West Azerbaijan	123,100
Mohammad Shahr	South Khorasan	100,500
Najafabad	Isfahan	221,800
Nasim Shahr	Tehran	157,500
Nazar Abad	Alborz	107,800
Neyshabur	Razavi Khorasan	239,200
Orumiyeh	West Azerbaijan	667,500
Pakdasht	Tehran	206,500
Piranshahr	West Azerbaijan	110,500
Qaem Shahr	Mazandaran	196,100
Qarchak	Tehran	191,600
Qazvin	Qazvin	381,600
Qods	Tehran	283,500
Qom	Qom	1,074,000
Quchan	Razavi Khorasan	103,800
Rafsanjan	Kerman	151,400
Rasht	Gilan	640,000
Sabzewar	Razavi Khorasan	231,600
Sanandaj	Kurdistan	374,000
Saqez	Kurdistan	139,700
Sari	Mazandaran	296,400
Saveh	Markazi	200,500
Semnan	Semnan	153,700
Shahinshahr	Isfahan	143,300
Shahr-e-Kord	Chaharmahal and Bakhtiari	159,800
Shahreza	Isfahan	123,800
Shahriar	Tehran	249,500
Shahrud	Semnan	140,500
Shiraz	Fars	1,460,700
Shoosh	Khuzestan	106,800
Sirjan	Kerman	185,600
Tabriz	East Azerbaijan	1,495,000
Tehran	Tehran	8,154,100
Torbat-e-Heydariyeh	Razavi Khorasan	131,200
Varamin	Tehran	219,000
Yasooj	Kohgiluyeh and Boyer-Ahmad	108,500
Yazd	Yazd	486,200
Zabol	Sistan and Baluchestan	137,700
Zahedan	Sistan and Baluchestan	560,700
Zanjan	Zanjan	386,900

== Iraq ==
City	Governorate	Population (2018)
Abu al-Kahsib	Basra	203,200
Ad-Diwaniyah	Al-Qādisiyyah	403,800
Al-'Amarah	Maysan	527,500
Al-Basrah	Basra	1,340,800
Al-Fallujah	Al Anbar	250,900
Al-Hillah	Babil	455,700
Al-Iskandriah	Babil	100,600
Al-Kufah	Najaf	171,300
Al-Kut	Wasit	389,400
Al-Mahmudiyah	Baghdad	101,400
Al-Mawsil	Nineveh	1,361,800
Al-Qurnah	Basra	126,400
An-Najaf	Najaf	747,300
An-Nasiriyah	Dhi Qar	558,400
Arbil	Erbil	879,100
Ar-Ramadi	Al Anbar	223,500
Ash-Shatrah	Dhi Qar	182,200
As-Samawah	Muthanna	221,700
As-Sulaymaniyah	Sulaymaniyah	676,500
Az-Zubayr	Basra	300,800
Baghdad	Baghdad	6,719,500
Ba'qubah	Diyala	279,100
Dahuk	Duhok	340,900
Kalar	Sulaymaniyah	145,200
Karbala'	Karbala	711,500
Kirkuk	Kirkuk	972,300
Samarra'	Saladin	144,800
Shatt al-'Arab	Basra	133,000
Suq as-Shuyukh	Dhi Qar	131,600
Suran	Erbil	131,800
Tal'afar	Nineveh	172,500
Tikrit	Saladin	109,000
Tuz Khurmatu	Saladin	102,600
Zakhu	Duhok	212,000

== Ireland ==
City	County	Population (2022)
Dublin	Dublin	592,713
Cork	Cork	131,423

== Israel ==
City	District	Population (2023)
Ashdod	Southern	227,960
Ashqelon	Southern	156,120
Bat Yam	Tel Aviv	129,584
Be'er Sheva	Southern	215,459
Bene Beraq	Tel Aviv	220,689
Bet Shemesh	Jerusalem	160,123
Haifa	Haifa	295,184
Hadera	Haifa	104,312
Holon	Tel Aviv	198,285
Jerusalem	Jerusalem	989,829
Netanya	Central	237,311
Petah Tikva	Central	257,032
Ramat Gan	Tel Aviv	174,329
Rehovot	Central	152,084
Kfar Saba	Central	101,615
Rishon Leziyyon	Central	263,007
Tel Aviv-Yafo	Tel Aviv	478,767
Herzelia	Tel Aviv	108,034
Modi'in-Maccabim-Re'ut	Central	100,845

== Italy ==
City	Region	Population (2023)
Bari	Apulia	316,736
Bergamo	Lombardy	119,809
Bologna	Emilia-Romagna	389,200
Bolzano	Trentino-Alto Adige/Südtirol	106,410
Brescia	Lombardy	197,236
Cagliari	Sardinia	148,296
Catania	Sicily	299,730
Ferrara	Emilia-Romagna	129,724
Florence	Tuscany	362,742
Foggia	Apulia	146,017
Forlì	Emilia-Romagna	116,726
Genoa	Liguria	561,191
Giugliano in Campania	Campania	124,222
Latina	Lazio	127,719
Livorno	Tuscany	153,859
Messina	Sicily	219,387
Milan	Lombardy	1,358,420
Modena	Emilia-Romagna	184,836
Monza	Lombardy	122,369
Naples	Campania	917,510
Novara	Piedmont	101,797
Padua	Veneto	207,112
Palermo	Sicily	632,499
Parma	Emilia-Romagna	197,018
Perugia	Umbria	162,367
Pescara	Abruzzo	118,829
Piacenza	Emilia-Romagna	102,728
Prato	Tuscany	196,317
Ravenna	Emilia-Romagna	156,050
Reggio Calabria	Calabria	171,181
Reggio Emilia	Emilia-Romagna	170,451
Rimini	Emilia-Romagna	149,681
Rome	Lazio	2,755,309
Salerno	Campania	127,485
Sassari	Sardinia	121,409
Syracuse	Sicily	116,635
Taranto	Apulia	188,310
Terni	Umbria	106,793
Trento	Trentino-Alto Adige/Südtirol	118,277
Trieste	Friuli-Venezia Giulia	199,032
Turin	Piedmont	847,398
Venice	Veneto	250,913
Verona	Veneto	256,049
Vicenza	Veneto	110,283

== Ivory Coast ==
Name	District	Population
Abidjan	Abidjan	4,395,000
Bouaké	Vallée du Bandama	536,190
Daloa	Sassandra-Marahoué	319,425
Korhogo	Savanes	286,000
Yamoussoukro	Yamoussoukro	281,735
San-Pédro	Bas-Sassandra	261,615
Gagnoa	Gôh-Djiboua	213,918
Man	Montagnes	188,704
Divo	Gôh-Djiboua	179,455
Anyama	Abidjan	103,297

== Jamaica ==
City	Parish	Population (2011)
Kingston	Kingston, St. Andrew	584,627
Portmore	St. Catherine	182,153
Spanish Town	St. Catherine	147,152
Montego Bay	St. James	110,115

== Japan ==
City	Prefecture	Population (2015)
Abiko	Chiba	131,600
Ageo	Saitama	225,200
Aizuwakamatsu	Fukushima	124,100
Akashi	Hyōgo	293,400
Akishima	Tokyo	111,500
Akita	Akita	315,800
Amagasaki	Hyōgo	452,600
Anjo	Aichi	184,100
Aomori	Aomori	287,700
Asahikawa	Hokkaido	339,600
Asaka	Saitama	136,300
Ashikaga	Tochigi	149,500
Atsugi	Kanagawa	225,700
Beppu	Ōita	122,100
Chiba	Chiba	971,900
Chigasaki	Kanagawa	239,300
Chikusei	Ibaraki	104,600
Chikushino	Fukuoka	101,100
Chofu	Tokyo	229,100
Daito	Osaka	123,200
Ebetsu	Hokkaido	120,600
Ebina	Kanagawa	130,200
Fuchu	Tokyo	260,300
Fuji	Shizuoka	248,400
Fujieda	Shizuoka	143,600
Fujimi	Saitama	108,100
Fujimino	Saitama	111,000
Fujinomiya	Shizuoka	130,800
Fujisawa	Kanagawa	423,900
Fukaya	Saitama	143,800
Fukui	Fukui	265,900
Fukuoka	Fukuoka	1,538,700
Fukushima	Fukushima	294,200
Fukuyama	Hiroshima	464,800
Funabashi	Chiba	622,900
Gifu	Gifu	406,700
Habikino	Osaka	112,700
Hachinohe	Aomori	231,300
Hachioji	Tokyo	577,500
Hadano	Kanagawa	167,400
Hakodate	Hokkaido	266,000
Hakusan	Ishikawa	109,300
Hamamatsu	Shizuoka	798,000
Handa	Aichi	116,900
Hatsukaichi	Hiroshima	114,900
Higashihiroshima	Hiroshima	192,900
Higashikurume	Tokyo	116,600
Higashimurayama	Tokyo	150,000
Higashiomi	Shiga	114,200
Higashiosaka	Osaka	502,800
Hikone	Shiga	113,700
Himeji	Hyōgo	535,700
Hino	Tokyo	186,300
Hirakata	Osaka	404,200
Hiratsuka	Kanagawa	258,200
Hirosaki	Aomori	177,400
Hiroshima	Hiroshima	1,194,000
Hitachi	Ibaraki	185,100
Hitachinaka	Ibaraki	155,700
Hofu	Yamaguchi	115,900
Ibaraki	Osaka	280,000
Ichihara	Chiba	274,700
Ichikawa	Chiba	481,700
Ichinomiya	Aichi	380,900
Ichinoseki	Iwate	121,600
Iida	Nagano	101,600
Iizuka	Fukuoka	129,100
Ikeda	Osaka	103,100
Ikoma	Nara	118,200
Imabari	Ehime	158,100
Inazawa	Aichi	136,900
Iruma	Saitama	148,400
Isahaya	Nagasaki	138,100
Ise	Mie	127,800
Isehara	Kanagawa	101,500
Isesaki	Gunma	208,800
Ishinomaki	Miyagi	147,200
Itami	Hyōgo	196,900
Iwaki	Fukushima	350,200
Iwakuni	Yamaguchi	136,800
Iwata	Shizuoka	167,200
Izumi	Osaka	186,100
Izumisano	Osaka	101,000
Izumo	Shimane	171,900
Joetsu	Niigata	197,000
Kadoma	Osaka	123,600
Kagoshima	Kagoshima	599,800
Kakamigahara	Gifu	144,700
Kakegawa	Shizuoka	114,600
Kakogawa	Hyōgo	267,400
Kamagaya	Chiba	108,900
Kamakura	Kanagawa	173,000
Kanazawa	Ishikawa	465,700
Kanoya	Kagoshima	103,600
Karatsu	Saga	122,800
Kariya	Aichi	149,800
Kashihara	Nara	124,000
Kashiwa	Chiba	414,000
Kasuga	Fukuoka	110,700
Kasugai	Aichi	306,500
Kasukabe	Saitama	232,700
Kawachinagano	Osaka	107,000
Kawagoe	Saitama	350,700
Kawaguchi	Saitama	578,100
Kawanishi	Yamagata	156,400
Kawasaki	Kanagawa	1,475,200
Kazo	Saitama	112,200
Kirishima	Kagoshima	125,900
Kiryu	Gunma	114,700
Kisarazu	Chiba	134,100
Kishiwada	Osaka	194,900
Kitakyushu	Fukuoka	961,300
Kitami	Hokkaido	121,200
Kobe	Hyōgo	1,537,300
Kochi	Kōchi	337,200
Kodaira	Tokyo	190,000
Kofu	Yamanashi	193,100
Koga	Ibaraki	140,900
Koganei	Tokyo	121,400
Kokubunji	Tokyo	122,700
Komaki	Aichi	149,500
Komatsu	Ishikawa	109,900
Konosu	Saitama	118,100
Koriyama	Fukushima	335,400
Koshigaya	Saitama	337,500
Kuki	Saitama	152,300
Kumagaya	Saitama	198,700
Kumamoto	Kumamoto	740,800
Kurashiki	Okayama	477,100
Kure	Hiroshima	228,600
Kurume	Fukuoka	304,600
Kusatsu	Shiga	137,200
Kushiro	Hokkaido	174,700
Kuwana	Mie	140,300
Kyoto	Kyoto	1,475,200
Machida	Tokyo	432,300
Maebashi	Gunma	336,200
Marugame	Kagawa	110,000
Matsubara	Osaka	120,800
Matsudo	Chiba	483,500
Matsue	Shimane	206,200
Matsumoto	Nagano	243,300
Matsusaka	Mie	163,900
Matsuyama	Ehime	514,900
Minoh	Osaka	133,400
Misato	Saitama	136,500
Mishima	Shizuoka	110,000
Mitaka	Tokyo	186,900
Mito	Ibaraki	270,800
Miyakonojo	Miyazaki	165,000
Miyazaki	Miyazaki	401,100
Moriguchi	Osaka	143,000
Morioka	Iwate	297,600
Musashino	Tokyo	144,700
Nagahama	Shiga	118,200
Nagano	Nagano	377,600
Nagaoka	Niigata	275,100
Nagareyama	Chiba	174,400
Nagasaki	Nagasaki	429,500
Nagoya	Aichi	2,295,600
Naha	Okinawa	319,400
Nara	Nara	360,300
Narashino	Chiba	167,900
Narita	Chiba	131,200
Nasushiobara	Tochigi	117,100
Neyagawa	Osaka	237,500
Niigata	Niigata	810,200
Niihama	Ehime	119,900
Niiza	Saitama	162,100
Nishinomiya	Hyōgo	487,900
Nishio	Aichi	168,000
Nishitokyo	Tokyo	200,000
Nobeoka	Miyazaki	125,200
Noda	Chiba	153,600
Numazu	Shizuoka	195,600
Obihiro	Hokkaido	169,300
Odawara	Kanagawa	194,100
Ogaki	Gifu	159,900
Oita	Ōita	478,100
Okayama	Okayama	719,500
Okazaki	Aichi	381,100
Okinawa	Okinawa	139,300
Ome	Tokyo	137,400
Omuta	Fukuoka	117,400
Onomichi	Hiroshima	138,600
Osaka	Osaka	2,691,200
Osaki	Miyagi	133,400
Oshu	Iwate	119,400
Ota	Gunma	219,800
Otaru	Hokkaido	121,900
Otsu	Shiga	341,000
Oyama	Tochigi	166,800
Saga	Saga	236,400
Sagamihara	Kanagawa	720,800
Saijo	Ehime	108,200
Saitama	Saitama	1,264,000
Sakado	Saitama	101,700
Sakata	Yamagata	106,200
Sakura	Chiba	172,700
Sanda	Hyōgo	112,700
Sano	Tochigi	118,900
Sapporo	Hokkaido	1,952,400
Sasebo	Nagasaki	255,400
Sayama	Saitama	152,400
Sendai	Miyagi	1,082,200
Seto	Aichi	129,000
Shimonoseki	Yamaguchi	268,500
Shizuoka	Shizuoka	705,000
Shunan	Yamaguchi	144,800
Soka	Saitama	247,000
Suita	Osaka	374,500
Suzuka	Mie	196,400
Tachikawa	Tokyo	176,300
Tajimi	Gifu	110,400
Takamatsu	Kagawa	420,700
Takaoka	Toyama	172,100
Takarazuka	Hyōgo	224,900
Takasaki	Gunma	370,900
Takatsuki	Osaka	351,800
Tama	Tokyo	146,600
Tochigi	Tochigi	159,200
Toda	Saitama	136,200
Tokai	Aichi	111,900
Tokorozawa	Saitama	340,400
Tokushima	Tokushima	258,600
Tokyo	Tokyo	9,272,700
Tomakomai	Hokkaido	172,700
Tondabayashi	Osaka	114,000
Toride	Ibaraki	106,600
Tottori	Tottori	193,700
Toyama	Toyama	418,700
Toyohashi	Aichi	374,800
Toyokawa	Aichi	182,400
Toyonaka	Osaka	395,500
Toyota	Aichi	422,500
Tsu	Mie	279,900
Tsuchiura	Ibaraki	140,800
Tsukuba	Ibaraki	227,000
Tsuruoka	Yamagata	129,700
Tsuyama	Okayama	103,800
Ube	Yamaguchi	169,400
Ueda	Nagano	156,800
Uji	Kyoto	184,700
Urasoe	Okinawa	114,200
Urayasu	Chiba	164,000
Uruma	Okinawa	118,900
Utsunomiya	Tochigi	518,600
Wakayama	Wakayama	364,200
Yachiyo	Chiba	193,200
Yaizu	Shizuoka	139,500
Yamagata (city)	Yamagata	253,800
Yamaguchi	Yamaguchi	197,400
Yamato	Kanagawa	232,900
Yao	Osaka	268,800
Yatsushiro	Kumamoto	127,500
Yokkaichi	Mie	311,000
Yokohama	Kanagawa	3,724,800
Yokosuka	Kanagawa	406,600
Yonago	Tottori	149,300
Zama	Kanagawa	128,700

== Jordan ==
City	Governorate	Population (2016)
Amman	Amman	3,752,600
Aqaba	Aqaba	148,400
Irbid	Irbid	502,700
Madaba	Madaba	105,400
Mafraq	Mafraq	106,000
Ramtha	Irbid	155,700
Russiefa	Zarqa	472,600
Zarqa	Zarqa	635,200

== Kazakhstan ==
City	Region	Population (2013)
Aktau	Mangystau	181,500
Aktobe	Aktobe	377,800
Almaty	Almaty	1,507,500
Astana	Astana	814,400
Atirau	Atyrau	209,700
Ekibastuz	Pavlodar	139,800
Karaganda	Qaraghandy	484,500
Koktshetau	Akmola	143,300
Kustanai	Kostanay	221,900
Kyzylorda	Kyzylorda	238,800
Pavlodar	Pavlodar	339,100
Petropavlovsk	North Kazakhstan	207,400
Rudni	Kostanay	127,700
Semipalatinsk	East Kazakhstan	315,800
Shimkent	Shymkent	682,600
Taldykorgan	Almaty Region	135,200
Taraz	Jambyl	351,400
Temirtau	Qaraghandy	182,600
Turkestan	Turkistan	155,600
Uralsk	West Kazakhstan	273,400
Ust-Kamenogorsk	East Kazakhstan	314,100
Zhanaozen	Mangystau	106,200

== Kenya ==
City	County	Population (2009)
Eldoret	Uasin Gishu	289,400
Garissa	Garissa	116,300
Kangundo	Machakos	218,600
Karuri	Kiambu	107,700
Kericho	Kericho	101,800
Kikuyu	Kiambu	233,200
Kisumu	Kisumu	388,300
Kitale	Trans-Nzoia	106,200
Kitui	Kitui	109,600
Machakos	Machakos	150,000
Malindi	Kilifi	118,300
Mavoko (Athi River)	Machakos	137,200
Mombasa	Mombasa	938,100
Nairobi	Nairobi	3,133,500
Naivasha	Nakuru	169,100
Nakuru	Nakuru	308,000
Ngong	Kajiado	107,200
Nyeri	Nyeri	119,400
Ruiru	Kiambu	238,900
Thika	Kiambu	136,900
Vihiga	Vihiga	118,700

== Kosovo ==
City	District	Population (2021)
Pristina	Pristina	161,751

== Kuwait ==
City	Governorate	Population (2018)
Hawally	Hawalli	957,090
Farwaniya	Farwaniya	892,915
Fintas	Ahmadi	516,252
Kuwait	Capital	468,670
Jahra	Jahra	452,259
Mangaf	Ahmadi	337,114
Firdaws	Farwaniya	264,718
Mubarak Al-Kabeer	Mubarak Al-Kabeer	250,135

== Kyrgyzstan ==
City	Region	Population (2016)
Bishkek	Bishkek City	955,100
Osh	Osh City	250,800

== See also ==
- World largest cities
