= List of cities in India by population =

Map of Indian cities. Hover over the dot to see the city name with rank in parentheses.

There are 496 cities in India with a population of over 100,000, of which 46 cities have a population of over 1,000,000. Mumbai is the most populated city followed by Delhi, Bengaluru and Hyderabad. (Note: As per the 2011 Census.)

Cities are a type of sub-administrative unit and are defined by the Ministry of Home Affairs. In some cases, cities are bifurcated into municipalities, which can lead to cities being included within other cities. India conducts decennial censuses with the two most recent being the 2001 census of India and the 2011 census of India. (Note: The 2027 census of India was originally set for 2021, but due to the Covid pandemic, it was delayed.)

- The list is based on population within the boundaries of the respective Municipal Corporations and not the actual urban area.
- Towns/Cities with populations of 1 lakh (100,000) are categorized as Class-I towns or Cities.
- The 46 cities with populations of 1 million and above are known as Million Plus UAs (urban agglomerations) or Cities.
- The 3 UAs with populations of 10 million and above are known as Mega Cities. (Note: The census defines the three as Greater Mumbai UA (18.4 million), Delhi UA (16.3 million) and Kolkata UA (14.1 million). See List of million-plus urban agglomerations in India.)

== List of cities above 100,000 ==
Cities
Name	State or Union territory	Census			Location
Name	State or Union territory	2011 Census	2001 Census	Change	Location
Mumbai ‡	Maharashtra	12,442,373	11,978,450	+3.9%	19.0760°N 72.8777°E
Delhi ‡	Delhi	11,034,555	9,879,172	+11.7%	28.7041°N 77.1025°E
Bengaluru ‡	Karnataka	8,443,675	5,682,293	+48.6%	12.9716°N 77.5946°E
Hyderabad ‡	Telangana	6,993,262	5,496,960	+27.2%	17.3850°N 78.4867°E
Chennai ‡	Tamil Nadu	6,748,026	4,343,645	+55.4%	13.0827°N 80.2707°E
Ahmedabad ‡	Gujarat	5,577,940	4,470,006	+24.8%	23.0225°N 72.5714°E
Kolkata ‡	West Bengal	4,496,694	4,580,546	−1.8%	22.5726°N 88.3639°E
Surat	Gujarat	4,467,797	2,788,126	+60.2%	21.1702°N 72.8311°E
Pune	Maharashtra	3,124,458	2,538,473	+23.1%	18.5204°N 73.8567°E
Jaipur ‡	Rajasthan	3,046,163	2,322,575	+31.2%	26.9124°N 75.7873°E
Lucknow ‡	Uttar Pradesh	2,817,105	2,185,927	+28.9%	26.8467°N 80.9462°E
Kanpur	Uttar Pradesh	2,765,348	2,551,337	+8.4%	26.4499°N 80.3319°E
Nagpur	Maharashtra	2,405,665	2,052,066	+17.2%	21.1458°N 79.0882°E
Indore ‡	Madhya Pradesh	1,964,086	1,503,237	+30.7%	22.7196°N 75.8577°E
Thane	Maharashtra	1,841,488	1,262,551	+45.9%	19.2183°N 72.9781°E
Bhopal ‡	Madhya Pradesh	1,798,218	1,458,416	+23.3%	23.2599°N 77.4126°E
Visakhapatnam ‡	Andhra Pradesh	1,728,128	1,345,938	+28.4%	17.6868°N 83.2185°E
Pimpri-Chinchwad	Maharashtra	1,727,692	1,020,448	+69.3%	18.6279°N 73.8009°E
Patna ‡	Bihar	1,684,222	1,431,477	+17.7%	25.5941°N 85.1376°E
Vadodara	Gujarat	1,670,806	1,338,244	+24.9%	22.3072°N 73.1812°E
Ghaziabad	Uttar Pradesh	1,648,643	968,256	+70.3%	28.6692°N 77.4538°E
Ludhiana ‡	Punjab	1,618,879	1,398,467	+15.8%	30.9000°N 75.8573°E
Agra	Uttar Pradesh	1,585,704	1,275,134	+24.4%	27.1767°N 78.0081°E
Nashik	Maharashtra	1,486,053	1,077,236	+38.0%	20.0112°N 73.7909°E
Faridabad ‡	Haryana	1,414,050	1,055,938	+33.9%	28.4089°N 77.3178°E
Meerut	Uttar Pradesh	1,305,429	1,068,772	+22.1%	28.9845°N 77.7064°E
Rajkot	Gujarat	1,286,678	967,476	+33.0%	22.3039°N 70.8022°E
Kalyan-Dombivli	Maharashtra	1,247,327	1,193,512	+4.5%	19.2358°N 73.1307°E
Vasai-Virar	Maharashtra	1,222,390	518,601	+135.7%	19.3925°N 72.8328°E
Varanasi	Uttar Pradesh	1,198,491	1,103,952	+8.6%	25.3176°N 82.9739°E
Srinagar ‡	Jammu and Kashmir	1,180,570	935,764	+26.2%	34.0836°N 74.7973°E
Chhatrapati Sambhajinagar	Maharashtra	1,175,116	873,311	+34.6%	19.8762°N 75.3433°E
Dhanbad ‡	Jharkhand	1,162,472	1,031,523	+12.7%	23.7957°N 86.4304°E
Amritsar	Punjab	1,132,383	979,801	+15.6%	31.6340°N 74.8723°E
Navi Mumbai	Maharashtra	1,120,547	704,002	+59.2%	19.0330°N 73.0297°E
Prayagraj	Uttar Pradesh	1,112,544	975,393	+14.1%	25.4358°N 81.8463°E
Howrah	West Bengal	1,077,075	1,007,532	+6.9%	22.5958°N 88.2636°E
Ranchi ‡	Jharkhand	1,073,427	847,093	+26.7%	23.3441°N 85.3096°E
Jabalpur	Madhya Pradesh	1,055,525	951,472	+10.9%	23.1815°N 79.9864°E
Gwalior	Madhya Pradesh	1,054,420	827,026	+27.5%	26.2183°N 78.1828°E
Coimbatore	Tamil Nadu	1,050,721	930,882	+12.9%	11.0168°N 76.9558°E
Vijayawada	Andhra Pradesh	1,034,358	941,760	+9.8%	16.5062°N 80.6480°E
Jodhpur	Rajasthan	1,033,756	856,525	+20.7%	26.2389°N 73.0243°E
Madurai	Tamil Nadu	1,017,865	928,869	+9.6%	9.9252°N 78.1198°E
Raipur ‡	Chhattisgarh	1,010,433	707,469	+42.8%	21.2514°N 81.6296°E
Kota	Rajasthan	1,001,694	703,150	+42.5%	25.2138°N 75.8648°E
Chandigarh ‡	Chandigarh	961,587	808,515	+18.9%	30.75°N 76.78°E
Guwahati ‡	Assam	957,352	809,895	+18.2%	26.183°N 91.733°E
Solapur	Maharashtra	951,558	872,478	+9.1%	17.6800°N 75.9200°E
Hubli–Dharwad	Karnataka	943,788	786,195	+20.0%	15.36167°N 75.08500°E
Bareilly	Uttar Pradesh	903,668	344,543	+162.3%	28.167°N 78.383°E
Mysore	Karnataka	893,062	755,379	+18.2%	12.26°N 76.6°E
Moradabad	Uttar Pradesh	887,871	641,583	+38.4%	28.83°N 78.78°E
Gurgaon	Haryana	876,969	173,542	+405.3%	28.456°N 77.029°E
Aligarh	Uttar Pradesh	874,408	669,087	+30.7%	27.88°N 78.08°E
Jalandhar	Punjab	862,886	706,043	+22.2%	31.326°N 75.576°E
Tiruchirappalli	Tamil Nadu	847,387	752,066	+12.7%	10.80500°N 78.68556°E
Bhubaneswar ‡	Odisha	843,402	648,032	+30.1%	20.27°N 85.84°E
Salem	Tamil Nadu	829,267	696,760	+19.0%	11.65°N 78.16°E
Mira-Bhayandar	Maharashtra	809,378	520,388	+55.5%	19.29°N 72.85°E
Thiruvananthapuram ‡	Kerala	743,691	744,983	−0.2%	8.48750°N 76.95250°E
Bhiwandi	Maharashtra	711,329	598,741	+18.8%	19.296664°N 73.063121°E
Saharanpur	Uttar Pradesh	705,478	455,754	+54.8%	29.964°N 77.546°E
Gorakhpur	Uttar Pradesh	673,446	622,701	+8.1%	26.7588°N 83.3697°E
Guntur	Andhra Pradesh	647,508	514,461	+25.9%	16.20°N 80.27°E
Amravati	Maharashtra	647,057	549,510	+17.8%	20.92583°N 77.76472°E
Bikaner	Rajasthan	644,406	529,690	+21.7%	28.01667°N 73.31194°E
Noida (town)	Uttar Pradesh	637,272	305,058	+108.9%	28.57°N 77.32°E
Jamshedpur	Jharkhand	631,364	573,096	+10.2%	22.783°N 86.200°E
Bhilai	Chhattisgarh	625,700	556,366	+12.5%	21.21°N 81.38°E
Warangal	Telangana	615,998	530,636	+16.1%	18.0°N 79.58°E
Cuttack	Odisha	610,189	534,654	+14.1%	20.52306°N 85.78806°E
Firozabad	Uttar Pradesh	604,214	279,102	+116.5%	27.150°N 78.400°E
Kochi	Kerala	602,046	596,473	+0.9%	9.967°N 76.217°E
Bhavnagar	Gujarat	593,368	511,085	+16.1%	21.76°N 72.15°E
Dehradun ‡	Uttarakhand	569,578	426,674	+33.5%	30.318°N 78.029°E
Durgapur	West Bengal	566,517	493,405	+14.8%	23.48°N 87.32°E
Asansol	West Bengal	563,917	475,439	+18.6%	23.68°N 86.99°E
Nanded Waghala	Maharashtra	550,439	430,733	+27.8%	19.15°N 77.30°E
Kolhapur	Maharashtra	549,236	493,167	+11.4%	16.69167°N 74.23333°E
Ajmer	Rajasthan	542,321	485,575	+11.7%	26.45°N 74.64°E
Kalaburagi	Karnataka	533,587	422,569	+26.3%	17.3333°N 76.8333°E
Loni	Uttar Pradesh	516,082	120,945	+326.7%	28.75°N 77.28°E
Ujjain	Madhya Pradesh	515,215	430,427	+19.7%	23.167°N 75.767°E
Siliguri	West Bengal	513,264	472,374	+8.7%	26.71°N 88.43°E
Ulhasnagar	Maharashtra	506,098	473,731	+6.8%	19.22°N 73.15°E
Jhansi	Uttar Pradesh	505,693	383,644	+31.8%	25.44862°N 78.56962°E
Sangli-Miraj & Kupwad	Maharashtra	502,793	436,781	+15.1%	16.860446°N 74.565518°E
Jammu ‡	Jammu and Kashmir	502,197	369,959	+35.7%	32.73°N 74.87°E
Nellore	Andhra Pradesh	499,575	378,428	+32.0%	14.43°N 79.97°E
Mangalore	Karnataka	488,968	399,565	+22.4%	12.87°N 74.88°E
Belgaum	Karnataka	488,157	399,653	+22.1%	15.850°N 74.500°E
Jamnagar	Gujarat	479,920	443,518	+8.2%	22.47°N 70.07°E
Tirunelveli	Tamil Nadu	473,637	411,831	+15.0%	8.73°N 77.7°E
Malegaon	Maharashtra	471,312	409,403	+15.1%	18.42°N 77.53°E
Gaya	Bihar	468,614	385,432	+21.6%	24.75°N 85.01°E
Ambattur	Tamil Nadu	466,205	310,967	+49.9%	13.0983°N 80.1622°E
Jalgaon	Maharashtra	460,228	368,618	+24.9%	20.997984°N 75.566711°E
Udaipur	Rajasthan	451,100	389,438	+15.8%	24.525049°N 73.677116°E
Maheshtala	West Bengal	448,317	385,266	+16.4%	22.5086210°N 88.2532182°E
Tiruppur	Tamil Nadu	444,352	718,395	−38.1%	11.1075°N 77.3398°E
Davanagere	Karnataka	434,971	364,523	+19.3%	14.4666°N 75.9242°E
Kozhikode	Kerala	431,560	436,556	−1.1%	11.25°N 75.77°E
Kurnool	Andhra Pradesh	430,214	269,122	+59.9%	15.8333°N 78.05°E
Akola	Maharashtra	425,817	400,520	+6.3%	20.7°N 77.00°E
Rajpur Sonarpur	West Bengal	424,368	336,707	+26.0%	22.4382026°N 88.4320450°E
Bokaro	Jharkhand	414,820	393,805	+5.3%	23.67°N 86.15°E
Bellary	Karnataka	410,445	316,766	+29.6%	15.100°N 76.917°E
Patiala	Punjab	406,192	303,151	+34.0%	30.32°N 76.40°E
South Dumdum	West Bengal	403,316	392,444	+2.8%	22.61°N 88.40°E
Gopalpur	West Bengal	400,146	271,811	+47.2%	22.62°N 88.44°E
Agartala ‡	Tripura	400,004	271,811	+47.2%	23.833°N 91.267°E
Bhagalpur	Bihar	398,138	340,767	+16.8%	25.250°N 87.000°E
Muzaffarnagar	Uttar Pradesh	392,768	316,729	+24.0%	29.472332°N 77.708874°E
Bhatpara	West Bengal	383,762	442,385	−13.3%	22.87°N 88.41°E
Latur	Maharashtra	382,940	299,985	+27.7%	18.40°N 76.56°E
Panihati	West Bengal	377,347	348,438	+8.3%	22.69°N 88.37°E
Dhule	Maharashtra	375,559	341,755	+9.9%	20.89972°N 74.76972°E
Rohtak	Haryana	374,292	286,807	+30.5%	28.8909°N 76.5796°E
Korba	Chhattisgarh	363,390	315,690	+15.1%	22.35°N 82.68°E
Bhilwara	Rajasthan	359,483	280,128	+28.3%	25.35°N 74.63°E
Berhampur	Odisha	356,598	307,792	+15.9%	19.32°N 84.78°E
Muzaffarpur	Bihar	354,462	305,525	+16.0%	26.0°N 85.45°E
Ahilyanagar	Maharashtra	350,859	307,615	+14.1%	19.08°N 74.73°E
Mathura	Uttar Pradesh	349,909	302,770	+15.6%	27.28°N 77.41°E
Kollam	Kerala	348,657	361,560	−3.6%	8.88°N 76.60°E
Avadi	Tamil Nadu	345,996	229,403	+50.3%	13.12°N 80.1°E
Kadapa	Andhra Pradesh	343,054	125,725	+172.9%	14.47°N 78.82°E
Rajamahendravaram	Andhra Pradesh	341,831	315,251	+8.4%	16.98°N 81.78°E
Bilaspur	Chhattisgarh	331,030	274,917	+20.4%	22.09°N 82.15°E
Kamarhati	West Bengal	330,211	314,507	+5.0%	22.67°N 88.37°E
Shahjahanpur	Uttar Pradesh	329,736	296,662	+11.1%	27.88°N 79.91°E
Bijapur	Karnataka	327,427	228,175	+43.5%	16.83°N 75.7°E
Rampur	Uttar Pradesh	325,313	281,494	+15.6%	28.8°N 79.0°E
Shivamogga	Karnataka	322,650	274,352	+17.6%	13.933°N 75.567°E
Chandrapur	Maharashtra	320,379	289,450	+10.7%	19.950°N 79.297°E
Junagadh	Gujarat	319,462	168,686	+89.4%	21.520°N 70.463°E
Thrissur	Kerala	315,957	317,526	−0.5%	10.52°N 76.21°E
Alwar	Rajasthan	315,379	260,593	+21.0%	27.34°N 76.38°E
Bardhaman	West Bengal	314,265	285,602	+10.0%	23.233°N 87.867°E
Kulti	West Bengal	313,809	289,903	+8.2%	23.73°N 86.85°E
Kakinada	Andhra Pradesh	312,538	296,329	+5.5%	16.93°N 82.22°E
Nizamabad	Telangana	311,152	288,722	+7.8%	18.672°N 78.094°E
Parbhani	Maharashtra	307,170	259,329	+18.4%	19.27°N 76.78°E
Tumkur	Karnataka	302,143	248,929	+21.4%	13.34°N 77.1°E
Hisar	Haryana	301,383	—	—	29.09°N 75.43°E
Ozhukarai ‡	Puducherry	300,104	217,707	+37.8%	11.9569800°N 79.773700°E
Bihar Sharif	Bihar	297,268	232,071	+28.1%	25.197°N 85.518°E
Darbhanga	Bihar	296,039	267,348	+10.7%	26.17°N 85.9°E
Panipat	Haryana	294,292	261,740	+12.4%	29.39°N 76.97°E
Aizawl ‡	Mizoram	293,416	228,280	+28.5%	23.43°N 92.43°E
Bally	West Bengal	293,373	260,906	+12.4%	22.65°N 88.34°E
Dewas	Madhya Pradesh	289,550	231,672	+25.0%	22.96°N 76.06°E
Tirupati	Andhra Pradesh	287,482	228,202	+26.0%	13.6355°N 79.4236°E
Ichalkaranji	Maharashtra	287,353	257,610	+11.5%	16.7°N 74.47°E
Karnal	Haryana	286,827	210,476	+36.3%	29.68°N 76.98°E
Bathinda	Punjab	285,788	217,256	+31.5%	30.20°N 74.95°E
Jalna	Maharashtra	285,577	235,795	+21.1%	19.83°N 75.88°E
Kirari Suleman Nagar	Delhi	283,211	153,874	+84.1%	28.69565°N 77.06533°E
Purnia	Bihar	282,248	171,687	+64.4%	25.78°N 87.47°E
Satna	Madhya Pradesh	280,222	225,464	+24.3%	24.16°N 80.83°E
Maunath Bhanjan	Uttar Pradesh	278,745	212,657	+31.1%	25.94167°N 83.56111°E
Barasat	West Bengal	278,435	231,515	+20.3%	22.72°N 88.48°E
Sonipat	Haryana	278,149	214,974	+29.4%	28.98°N 77.02°E
Farrukhabad	Uttar Pradesh	276,581	228,333	+21.1%	27.37°N 79.63°E
Sagar	Madhya Pradesh	273,296	232,133	+17.7%	23.83°N 78.71°E
Rourkela	Odisha	272,721	224,601	+21.4%	22.24917°N 84.88278°E
Durg	Chhattisgarh	268,806	232,517	+15.6%	21.19°N 81.28°E
Imphal ‡	Manipur	268,243	221,492	+21.1%	24.82°N 93.95°E
Ratlam	Madhya Pradesh	264,914	222,202	+19.2%	23.31667°N 75.06667°E
Hapur	Uttar Pradesh	262,983	211,983	+24.1%	28.72°N 77.78°E
Arrah	Bihar	261,430	203,380	+28.5%	25.55750°N 84.67°E
Karimnagar	Telangana	261,185	205,653	+27.0%	18.43694°N 79.12417°E
Anantapur	Andhra Pradesh	261,004	218,808	+19.3%	14.68°N 77.6°E
New Delhi ‡	Delhi	257,803	302,147	−14.7%	28.61389°N 77.20889°E
Etawah	Uttar Pradesh	256,838	210,453	+22.0%	26.77°N 79.03°E
Ambarnath	Maharashtra	253,475	203,795	+24.4%	19.209°N 73.186°E
Bharatpur	Rajasthan	252,342	204,587	+23.3%	27.22°N 77.48°E
Begusarai	Bihar	252,008	93,378	+169.9%	25.42°N 86.13°E
Tiruvottiyur	Tamil Nadu	249,446	212,281	+17.5%	13.16°N 80.3°E
North Dumdum	West Bengal	249,142	220,042	+13.2%	22.6520800°N 88.4190700°E
Gandhidham	Gujarat	247,992	166,388	+49.0%	23.08°N 70.13°E
Baranagar	West Bengal	245,213	250,768	−2.2%	22.64°N 88.37°E
Puducherry ‡	Puducherry	244,377	220,749	+10.7%	11.930965°N 79.785182°E
Thoothukudi	Tamil Nadu	237,830	216,058	+10.1%	8.7625°N 78.134218°E
Sikar	Rajasthan	237,532	184,904	+28.5%	27.62°N 75.15°E
Rewa	Madhya Pradesh	235,654	183,274	+28.6%	24.53°N 81.3°E
Mirzapur	Uttar Pradesh	234,871	205,053	+14.5%	25.15°N 82.58°E
Raichur	Karnataka	234,073	207,421	+12.8%	16.2°N 77.37°E
Pali	Rajasthan	230,075	187,641	+22.6%	25.77°N 73.33°E
Ramagundam	Telangana	229,644	236,600	−2.9%	18.8000°N 79.4500°E
Haridwar	Uttarakhand	228,832	175,010	+30.8%	29.956°N 78.17°E
Vijayanagaram	Andhra Pradesh	228,025	174,324	+30.8%	18.12°N 83.42°E
Katihar	Bihar	226,261	175,169	+29.2%	25.53°N 87.58°E
Nagercoil	Tamil Nadu	224,849	208,179	+8.0%	8.17899°N 77.43227°E
Sri Ganganagar	Rajasthan	224,532	210,713	+6.6%	29.92°N 73.88°E
Karawal Nagar	Delhi	224,281	148,549	+51.0%	28.727122°N 77.270473°E
Mango	Jharkhand	223,805	166,125	+34.7%	22.82750°N 86.21639°E
Thanjavur	Tamil Nadu	222,943	215,314	+3.5%	10.7870°N 79.1378°E
Bulandshahr	Uttar Pradesh	222,519	176,425	+26.1%	28.406°N 77.8498°E
Uluberia	West Bengal	222,240	202,135	+9.9%	22.47°N 88.1011°E
Murwara	Madhya Pradesh	221,883	187,029	+18.6%	23.837757°N 80.394047°E
Sambhal	Uttar Pradesh	220,813	182,478	+21.0%	28.5852°N 78.5708°E
Singrauli	Madhya Pradesh	220,257	185,190	+18.9%	24.19899°N 82.66765°E
Nadiad	Gujarat	218,095	192,913	+13.1%	22.7°N 72.87°E
Secunderabad	Telangana	217,910	206,102	+5.7%	17.45°N 78.50°E
Naihati	West Bengal	217,900	215,303	+1.2%	22.893956°N 88.415205°E
Yamunanagar	Haryana	216,677	189,696	+14.2%	30.1294°N 77.2674°E
Bidhan Nagar	West Bengal	215,514	164,221	+31.2%	22.58°N 88.42°E
Pallavaram	Tamil Nadu	215,417	144,623	+49.0%	12.967696°N 80.158073°E
Bidar	Karnataka	214,373	172,877	+24.0%	17.9°N 77.55°E
Panchkula	Haryana	211,355	140,925	+50.0%	30.6942°N 76.8606°E
Burhanpur	Madhya Pradesh	210,886	193,725	+8.9%	21.30868°N 76.230258°E
Raurkela Industrial Township	Odisha	210,317	206,693	+1.8%	22.2322°N 84.8812°E
Kharagpur	West Bengal	207,604	188,761	+10.0%	22.33971°N 87.32501°E
Dindigul	Tamil Nadu	207,327	196,955	+5.3%	10.368958°N 77.980356°E
Gandhinagar ‡	Gujarat	206,167	195,985	+5.2%	23.216667°N 72.683333°E
Hospet	Karnataka	206,167	164,240	+25.5%	15.2665°N 76.3872°E
Nangloi Jat	Delhi	205,596	150,948	+36.2%	28.679568°N 77.067994°E
Malda	West Bengal	205,521	161,456	+27.3%	25.004444°N 88.145833°E
Ongole	Andhra Pradesh	204,746	150,471	+36.1%	15.5057°N 80.0499°E
Eluru	Andhra Pradesh	203,780	190,347	+7.1%	16.71°N 81.12°E
Deoghar	Jharkhand	203,123	112,525	+80.5%	24.28°N 86.41°E
Chapra	Bihar	202,352	79,190	+155.5%	25.7848°N 84.7274°E
Haldia	West Bengal	200,827	170,673	+17.7%	22.03°N 88.06°E
Khandwa	Madhya Pradesh	200,738	172,242	+16.5%	21.82168°N 76.34826°E
Puri	Odisha	200,564	—	—	19.798254°N 85.824938°E
Nandyal	Andhra Pradesh	200,516	152,676	+31.3%	15.47°N 78.48°E
Morena	Madhya Pradesh	200,482	150,959	+32.8%	26.498918°N 77.995344°E
Amroha	Uttar Pradesh	198,471	165,129	+20.2%	28.9031°N 78.4675°E
Anand	Gujarat	198,282	130,685	+51.7%	22.5645°N 72.9289°E
Bhind	Madhya Pradesh	197,585	153,752	+28.5%	26.56°N 78.78°E
Bhalswa Jahangir Pur	Delhi	197,148	152,339	+29.4%	28.735556°N 77.163889°E
Madhyamgram	West Bengal	196,127	155,451	+26.2%	22.69243°N 88.46551°E
Bhiwani	Haryana	196,057	169,531	+15.6%	28.78°N 76.13°E
Panvel	Maharashtra	195,373	104,058	+87.8%	18.988775°N 73.110128°E
Baharampur	West Bengal	195,223	160,143	+21.9%	24.0988°N 88.2676°E
Ambala	Haryana	195,153	139,279	+40.1%	30.360993°N 76.797819°E
Morvi	Gujarat	194,947	145,719	+33.8%	22.8116°N 70.8230°E
Fatehpur	Uttar Pradesh	193,193	151,757	+27.3%	25.927739°N 80.81266°E
Raebareli	Uttar Pradesh	191,316	169,333	+13.0%	26.230898°N 81.233152°E
Khora	Uttar Pradesh	190,005	—	—	28.6692°N 77.4279°E
Chittoor	Andhra Pradesh	189,332	152,654	+24.0%	13.2172°N 79.1003°E
Bhusawal	Maharashtra	187,421	172,372	+8.7%	21.05°N 75.77°E
Orai	Uttar Pradesh	187,137	139,318	+34.3%	25.990234°N 79.453344°E
Bahraich	Uttar Pradesh	186,223	168,323	+10.6%	27.57°N 81.59°E
Vellore	Tamil Nadu	185,803	177,230	+4.8%	12.9165°N 79.1325°E
Veraval	Gujarat	185,797	141,250	+31.5%	20.915°N 70.362°E
Mahesana	Gujarat	184,991	141,453	+30.8%	23.6°N 72.4°E
Khammam	Telangana	184,210	218,689	−15.8%	17.24°N 80.15°E
Sambalpur	Odisha	184,000	153,643	+19.8%	21.465268°N 83.975731°E
Raiganj	West Bengal	183,612	165,212	+11.1%	25.6138°N 88.1245°E
Sirsa	Haryana	182,534	160,735	+13.6%	29.5349°N 75.0290°E
Danapur	Bihar	182,429	131,176	+39.1%	25.623962°N 85.041432°E
Serampore	West Bengal	181,842	197,857	−8.1%	22.75°N 88.34°E
Sultan Pur Majra	Delhi	181,554	164,426	+10.4%	28.689664°N 77.076484°E
Guna	Madhya Pradesh	180,935	137,175	+31.9%	24.6469°N 77.3110°E
Jaunpur	Uttar Pradesh	180,362	160,055	+12.7%	25.7460°N 82.6836°E
Shivpuri	Madhya Pradesh	179,977	146,892	+22.5%	25.4358°N 77.7398°E
Surendranagar Dudhrej	Gujarat	177,851	156,161	+13.9%	22.731986°N 71.633906°E
Unnao	Uttar Pradesh	177,658	144,662	+22.8%	26.5470°N 80.4878°E
Hugli-Chuchura	West Bengal	177,259	170,201	+4.1%	22.9°N 88.39°E
Sitapur	Uttar Pradesh	177,234	—	—	27.57°N 80.67°E
Hastsal	Delhi	176,877	—	—	28.6568°N 77.0572°E
Tambaram	Tamil Nadu	174,787	—	—	12.9249°N 80.1000°E
Adityapur	Jharkhand	174,355	—	—	22.8046°N 86.1627°E
Badlapur	Maharashtra	174,226	97,948	+77.9%	19.1551°N 73.2654°E
Alappuzha	Kerala	174,176	177,029	−1.6%	9.4981°N 76.3388°E
Cuddalore	Tamil Nadu	173,636	—	—	11.756169°N 79.76693°E
Silchar	Assam	172,830	—	—	24.82°N 92.8°E
Gadag-Betageri	Karnataka	172,612	—	—	15.42250°N 75.62571°E
Bahadurgarh	Haryana	170,767	—	—	28.68°N 76.92°E
Machilipatnam	Andhra Pradesh	169,892	179,353	−5.3%	16.187°N 81.137°E
Shimla ‡	Himachal Pradesh	169,578	142,555	+19.0%	31.104°N 77.1708°E
Medinipur	West Bengal	169,264	—	—	22.4250°N 87.3190°E
Deoli	Delhi	169,122	—	—	28.502539°N 77.231173°E
Bharuch	Gujarat	169,007	—	—	21.7051°N 72.9959°E
Hoshiarpur	Punjab	168,653	—	—	31.5320°N 75.9180°E
Jind	Haryana	167,592	—	—	29.30863°N 76.33842°E
Chandannagar	West Bengal	166,867	—	—	22.86646°N 88.35485°E
Adoni	Andhra Pradesh	166,344	—	—	15.63°N 77.27°E
Tonk	Rajasthan	165,294	—	—	26.15657°N 75.78194°E
Faizabad	Uttar Pradesh	165,228	—	—	26.775486°N 82.150182°E
Tenali	Andhra Pradesh	164,937	—	—	16.239°N 80.645°E
Alandur	Tamil Nadu	164,430	—	—	12.997500°N 80.200600°E
Kancheepuram	Tamil Nadu	164,384	—	—	12.8300°N 79.7100°E
Vapi	Gujarat	163,630	—	—	20.36381°N 72.92290°E
Rajnandgaon	Chhattisgarh	163,114	—	—	21.0976°N 81.0337°E
Proddatur	Andhra Pradesh	162,717	—	—	14.7526°N 78.5541°E
Navsari	Gujarat	160,941	—	—	20.94237°N 72.92467°E
Budaun	Uttar Pradesh	159,285	—	—	28.038114°N 79.126677°E
Uttarpara Kotrung	West Bengal	159,147	—	—	22.676846°N 88.338509°E
Mahbubnagar	Andhra Pradesh	157,733	—	—	16.74892°N 77.99489°E
Erode	Tamil Nadu	157,101	173,600	−9.5%	11.21°N 77.44°E
Batala	Punjab	156,619	—	—	31.8186°N 75.2029°E
Saharsa	Bihar	156,540	125,167	+25.1%	25.88°N 86.60°E
Haldwani-Kathgodam	Uttarakhand	156,078	—	—	29.2183°N 79.5130°E
Vidisha	Madhya Pradesh	155,951	125,453	+24.3%	23.526037°N 77.810925°E
Thanesar	Haryana	155,152	—	—	29.9690°N 76.8783°E
Kishangarh	Rajasthan	154,886	—	—	26.60250°N 74.85706°E
Hindupur	Andhra Pradesh	151,835	—	—	13.8223°N 77.5009°E
Sasaram	Bihar	147,396	131,172	+12.4%	24.95°N 84.03°E
Hajipur	Bihar	147,126	119,412	+23.2%	25.69°N 85.20°E
Beed	Maharashtra	146,709	138,196	+6.2%	18.9891°N 75.7601°E
Bhimavaram	Andhra Pradesh	142,280	—	—	16.544°N 81.524°E
Dehri	Bihar	137,068	119,057	+15.1%	24.91°N 84.18°E
Madanapalle	Andhra Pradesh	135,669	—	—	13.5560°N 78.5010°E
Siwan	Bihar	134,458	109,919	+22.3%	26.22°N 84.36°E
Bettiah	Bihar	132,896	116,670	+13.9%	26.80°N 84.51°E
Gondia	Maharashtra	132,813	120,902	+9.9%	21.4624°N 80.2210°E
Guntakal	Andhra Pradesh	126,270	—	—	15.1670°N 77.3667°E
Srikakulam	Andhra Pradesh	125,939	—	—	18.2969°N 83.8968°E
Motihari	Bihar	125,183	100,683	+24.3%	26.64°N 84.90°E
Dharmavaram	Andhra Pradesh	121,874	—	—	14.4149°N 77.7214°E
Satara	Maharashtra	120,195	108,048	+11.2%	17.688°N 74.006°E
Barshi	Maharashtra	118,722	104,785	+13.3%	18.2342°N 75.6950°E
Gudivada	Andhra Pradesh	118,167	—	—	16.434°N 80.993°E
Yavatmal	Maharashtra	116,551	120,676	−3.4%	20.3888°N 78.1204°E
Narasaraopet	Andhra Pradesh	116,250	—	—	16.236111°N 80.053889°E
Bagaha	Bihar	113,012	91,467	+23.6%	27.0990°N 84.0900°E
Achalpur	Maharashtra	112,311	107,316	+4.7%	21.2575°N 77.5100°E
Osmanabad	Maharashtra	111,825	80,625	+38.7%	18.181584°N 76.038895°E
Nandurbar	Maharashtra	111,037	94,368	+17.7%	21.3667°N 74.2500°E
Miryalaguda	Telangana	109,891	91,395	+20.2%	16.86°N 79.58°E
Tadipatri	Andhra Pradesh	108,171	—	—	14.908321°N 78.010313°E
Kishanganj	Bihar	107,076	85,590	+25.1%	26.09°N 87.93°E
Karaikudi	Tamil Nadu	106,714	86,596	+23.2%	10.0730°N 78.7808°E
Wardha	Maharashtra	106,444	111,118	−4.2%	20.7453°N 78.6022°E
Suryapet	Telangana	105,250	94,585	+11.3%	17.140537°N 79.620445°E
Jamalpur	Bihar	105,221	96,983	+8.5%	25.31°N 86.49°E
Kavali	Andhra Pradesh	104,000	—	—	14.9132°N 79.9930°E
Tadepalligudem	Andhra Pradesh	103,906	—	—	16.808°N 81.531°E
Udgir	Maharashtra	103,550	91,933	+12.6%	18.3920°N 77.1170°E
Amaravati ‡	Andhra Pradesh	103,000	—	—	16.541°N 80.515°E
Buxar	Bihar	102,591	83,168	+23.4%	25.56°N 83.98°E
Jehanabad	Bihar	102,456	81,503	+25.7%	25.22°N 84.99°E
Greater Noida	Uttar Pradesh	102,054	—	—	28.4744°N 77.5040°E
Hinganghat	Maharashtra	101,805	92,342	+10.2%	20.5480°N 78.8390°E
Aurangabad	Bihar	101,520	79,393	+27.9%	24.75°N 84.37°E
India		1,210,854,977	1,028,737,436	+17.7%	

== See also ==
- List of million-plus urban agglomerations in India
- List of metropolitan areas in India
- List of states and union territories of India by population
