= Rani Khera =

Rani Khera may refer to:

== Places ==
- Rani Khera, Bachhrawan, a village in Uttar Pradesh, India
- Rani Khera, a village in Bharawan, Hardoi district, Uttar Pradesh, India
- Rani Khera, Delhi, an urban village and a constituent of the urban agglomeration of Delhi
- Rani Khera, Harpalpur, a village in Harpalpur, Hardoi, in Uttar Pradesh, India
- Rani Khera, Sareni, a village in Uttar Pradesh, India
- Rani Khera, Shivgarh, a village in Uttar Pradesh, India

== See also ==
- Maharani Khera
