= Deoli =

Deoli may refer to:

== Places ==
- Deoli, Delhi
- Deoli, Maharashtra
- Deoli, Rajasthan
- Deoli, Uttarakhand

== Constituencies ==
- Deoli (Delhi Assembly constituency)
- Deoli (Maharashtra Vidhan Sabha constituency)

== Other use ==
- Deoli Irregular Force
