= Mini Qutub Minar =

Minaret tower in Delhi, India

- Chhota Qutub Minar, Mini Minar, Kaushal Minar, Hastsal-ki-Laat, Hashtsal Minaret
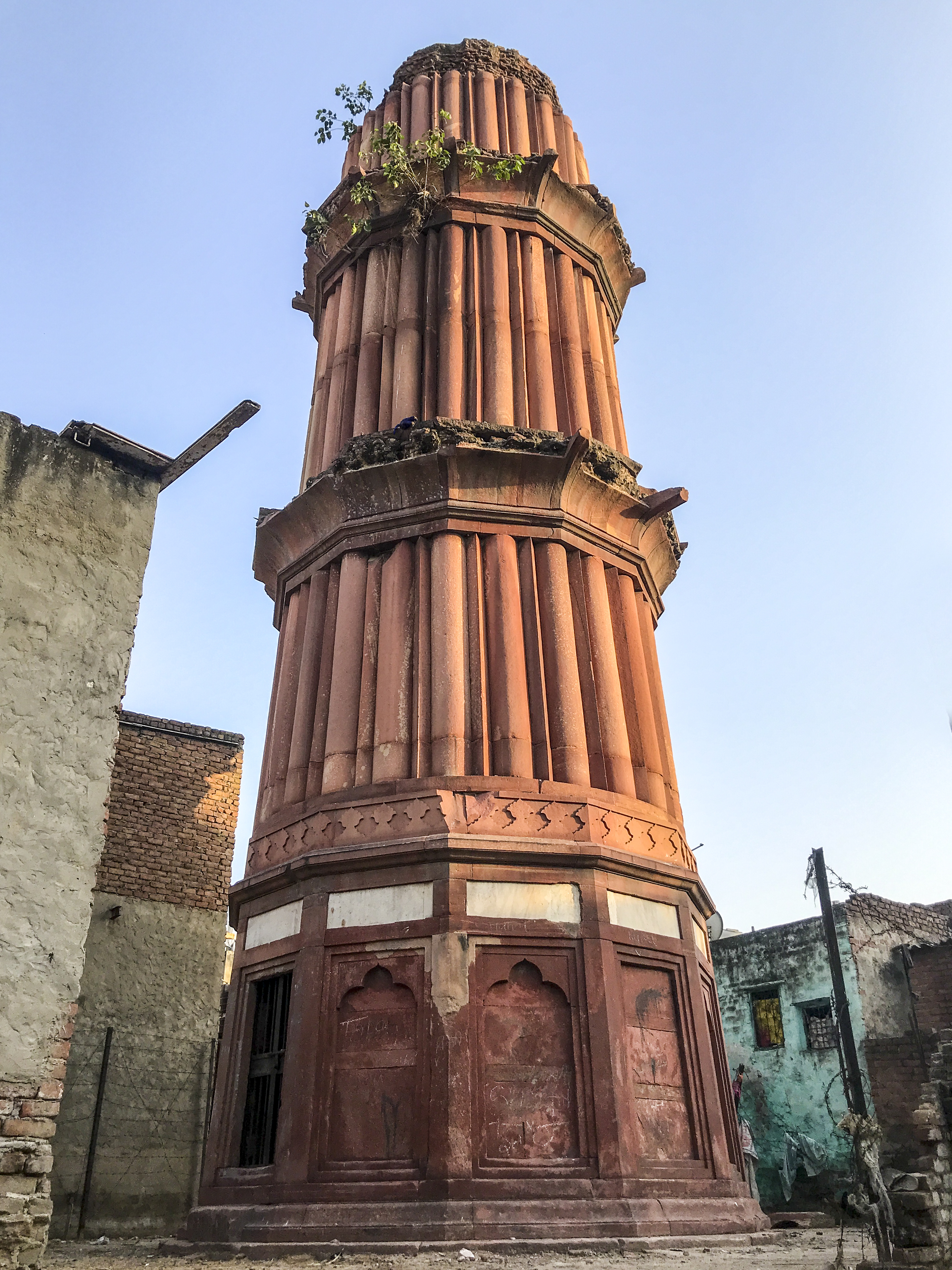
- Interactive map of Mini Qutub Minar
- Type: Minaret
- Cultures: Mughal
- Location: Hastsal, Delhi, India
- Region: West Delhi, Delhi

History
- Built: 1650; 376 years ago
- Built by: Mughal emperor, Shah Jahan
- Abandoned: Yes

Site notes
- Material: Bricks, red sandstone
- Height: 16.87 m (55.3 ft)
- Condition: Endangered
- Public access: Yes

The Mini Qutub Minar (local: Chhota Qutub Minar, Mini Minar, Kaushal Minar, Hastsal ki Laat) is a minaret tower in Hastsal village, near Uttam Nagar in West Delhi, Delhi, India. It was built in the 1650 by the Mughal emperor Shah Jahan (reign, 1628-1658) near his hunting lodge in Hasthal. The three-storey tower is 16.87 meters (55 feet) tall and stands on a raised octagonal platform. The minar (minaret) is built with bricks and clad with red sandstone. The tower structure and design resembles the Qutub Minar of Delhi and was inspired by it.

Originally, the Mini Qutub Minar was a 5-storey tower, topped out with a domed Chhatri pavilion at the top. It was used by emperor Shah Jahan for his entertainment after hunting in the all encompassing wilderness that used to surround this colossal Hastsal minaret and royal hunting lodge. The emperor's Shikargah or hunting lodge is situated a few hundred metres from the minaret tower.

The Mini Qutub Minar is a 'Grade A' listed, protected heritage monument with the Department of Archaeology, India.

== History ==
In the past, the Hastsal area where the Minar is located, used to be submerged in water and it used to be elephants' corridor and resting place. The origin of the area name ‘Hastsal' indicates this with haathi (elephant) and sthal (place).

In the early 17th century, Mughal emperor, Shah Jahan used Hastsal as one of his hunting lodges. In 1650, he commissioned the construction of a tall minaret similar to Qutub Minar in Delhi. When completed, the Mini Qutub Minar was much higher than it is now. It was a tall 5-storey tower with an internal stairway leading to the domed Chhatri pavilion at the top. It was a gorgeous hunting pavilion tower in the center of a wilderness. The emperor rested in the tower top, royally-entertained with his immediate retinue after hunting in the surrounding wilderness.

Local legends claim there used to be a tunnel from the tower to the royal hunting lodge which lie a few hundred meters apart from each other.

The domed Chhatri pavilion and the top two storeys of the tower had collapsed in the 18th century.

In recent history, Shah Jahan's Mini Minar and his royal hunting lodge have remained abandoned and forgotten. It was left to crumble away and become completely surrounded by the urbanization that replaced the wilderness of Hastsal area.

In the past, local kids were able to climb the tower using the internal stairway and play at the top but it is no longer allowed.

== Architecture ==
The Mini Qutub Minar structure is similar to Qutub Minar in Delhi. It originally consisted of five storeys, each with a reducing diameter. A narrow staircase built inside led to the top. Each storey is surrounded by an octagonal ring in the outside with red sandstone overhanging eves (Chhajja) like in the Qutub Minar. The minar is built using Lakhori bricks.

However, 20th-century historian Zafar Hasan who documented the tower disagrees with the tower once been five storeys high. He wrote, "Locally it is said that it originally consisted of five storeys and was crowned by a domed chhatri but the two topmost storeys subsequently disappeared...the statement that it was originally five-storeys high does not seem to be true, possibly it was topped by a chhatri which is not now existing".

== Threats ==
The Mini Qutub Minar is endangered today due to decades of neglect and lack of conservation. It is in danger from both natural elements and the encroachment of new constructions that are taking place around the tower in Hastsal. The tower is today completely surrounded by haphazardly built houses, buildings and new constructions. New constructions have sprung up right up to the tower base.

The raised octagonal platform of Mini Qutub Minar used to have a lower platform. New constructions have encroached into the lower platform. The steps that lead up to the octagonal platform have disappeared. The only access way to the tower is by walking through a grimy half-meter wide lane that is surrounded in all sides by new constructions.

Few hundred meters away the Shajahan's historic royal hunting lodge (Shikargah) is facing the same situation. It also lay abandon, crumbling and completely encroached upon with new constructions.
