= Quammruddin Nagar =

Quammruddin Nagar Kamruddin Nagar
- city
- Location in India
- Coordinates: 28.669°N 77.050°E
- Country: India
- State: Delhi
- District: Nangloi

Government
  - Type: Delhi government
  - Body: Municipal Corporation of Delhi

Area
  - Total: 5 km^{2} (1.9 sq mi)

Population (2020)
  - Total: 15,697
  - Density: 3,100/km^{2} (8,100/sq mi)

Languages
  - Official: Hindi, English
- Time zone: UTC+5:30 (IST)
- Postal code: 110041

Quammruddin Nagar is a census town, near Nangloi in West district Nangloi in the Union Territory of Delhi in India, surrounded by Paschim Vihar, Delhi Outer Ring road, Najafgarh and Bahadurgarh.

National Highway 10 (Rohtak Road) runs through Nangloi. It is connected to the Green Line of the Delhi Metro. Metro station—Nangloi railway metro station and Nangloi metro station. Railway station—Nangloi railway station.

== Demographics ==
As of 2020 India census, Kamruddin Nagar had a population of 15697. Males constitute 55% of the population and females 45%. Kamruddin Nagar has an average literacy rate of 67%, higher than the national average of 59.5%: male literacy is 73%, and female literacy is 58%. In Kamruddin Nagar, 12% of the population is under 6 years of age.
