= Ziauddin Pur =

- Village
- Location in India
- Coordinates: 28.6936°N 77.3073°E
- Country: India
- State: Delhi
- District: North East

Population (2001)
  - Total: 48,028

Languages
  - Official: Hindi, English
- Time zone: UTC+5:30 (IST)
- PIN: 110094

Ziauddin Pur is a village and census town in Mustafabad in North East district in the Indian state of Delhi.

== Demographics ==
As of 2001 India census, Ziauddin Pur had a population of 48,028. Males constitute 54% of the population and females 46%. Ziauddin Pur has an average literacy rate of 67%, higher than the national average of 59.5%: male literacy is 73%, and female literacy is 59%. In Ziauddin Pur, 17% of the population is under 6 years of age.
