= Mubarak Pur Dabas =

- Village
- Nickname: Mubarakpur
- Location in India Mubarak Pur Dabas (India)
- Coordinates: 28.7093°N 77.0328°E
- Country: India
- Union Territory: Delhi
- District: North West

Government
  - Body: MCD

Population (2011)
  - Total: 12,043

Languages
  - Official: Hindi, English, Haryanvi
- Time zone: UTC+5:30 (IST)
- PIN: 110081

Mubarak Pur Dabas is a village in North West district in the Indian union territory of Delhi. It is a Jaat village in the north-west region of Delhi, dominated by the Dabas gotra.

== Demographics ==
As per 2011 India Census, Mubarak Pur Dabas census town has population of 12,043 out of which 6,441 are males while 5,602 are females. Literacy rate of the village is 81.64% which is lower than state average of 86.21%. In Mubarak Pur Dabas, Male literacy is around 88.73% while female literacy rate is 73.48%. Kanjhawala, Ghevra, Nangloi are the neighbouring villages of Mubarak Pur Dabas. The most common language of Mubarak Pur Dabas is Haryanvi, along with Hindi.
