= Bankauli =

Coordinates: 28°48′44.0″N 77°8′25.6″E

- census town
- Location in India
- Country: India
- Union Territory: Delhi
- District: North West

Population (2011)
  - Total: 6,310

Languages
  - Official: Hindi
- Time zone: UTC+5:30 (IST)

Bankauli is a census town in North West district in the Indian territory of Delhi.

== Demography ==
In the 2011 census, Bankauli had 1,104 houses with a population of 5,339, consisting of 2,953 males and 2,386 females. The population of children aged 0–6 was 689, making up 12.99% of the total population of the village. The average sex ratio was 808 out of 1000, which is loweer than the state average of 868 out of 1000. The child sex ratio in the village was 799 out of 1000, which is lower than the average of 871 out of 1000 in the territory of Delhi. The total Scheduled Castes and Scheduled Tribes population in the town was 827 people and all were Scheduled Castes. There are no people of the Scheduled Tribe in the town.
