= Pooth Kalan =

- Village
- Nickname: Baddi Pooth
- Location in India Pooth Kalan (Delhi)
- Coordinates: 28.7117°N 77.07796°E
- Country: India
- Union Territory: Delhi
- District: North West
- Established: 1200

Government
  - Type: Municipal Corporation
  - Body: Municipal Corporation of Delhi

Population (2001)
  - Total: 50,587

Languages
  - Official: Hindi, English
  - Mother Tongue: Haryanvi
- Time zone: UTC+5:30 (IST)
- PIN: 110086

Pooth Kalan is a village towards Rohini in the North West district of the Union Territory of Delhi. It is majorly inhabited by Hindus.

== Demographics ==
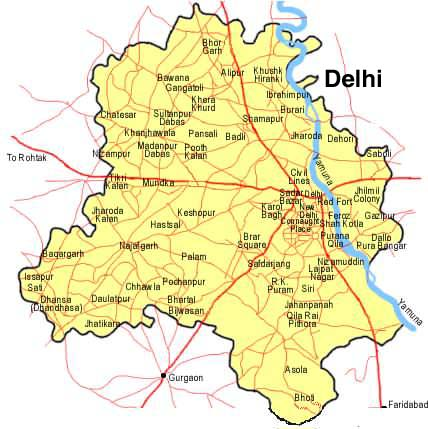
Map of Delhi showing location of Pooth Kalan

As of 2001 Indian census, Pooth Kalan had a population of 50,587. Males constitute 55% of the population and females 45%. Pooth Kalan has an average literacy rate of 64%. Male literacy is 72% and female literacy is 56%. In Pooth Kalan, 17% of the population is under 6 years of age.
