= Dindarpur =

Dindarpur Deenpur
- census town
- Location in Delhi Dindarpur (India)
- Coordinates: 28.60°N 76.99°E
- Country: India
- State: Delhi
- District: South West Delhi
- Tehsil: Najafgarh
- Elevation: 217 m (712 ft)

Population (2011)
  - Total: 30,856
- Time zone: UTC+5:30 (IST)
- PIN: 110043
- Census code: 64051

Dindarpur is a census town in Delhi, India. It is located in the Najafgarh tehsil of the Southwest Delhi district.

== Overview ==
Dindarpur is a census town in Delhi, India. Also known as Deenpur, it is located in the Najafgarh tehsil of the South West Delhi district. As of the 2011 census, it had a total population of 35,856 people comprising 19,121 males and 16,735 females.

== Politics ==
Pravesh Verma of BJP is the MP from this constituency while Gulab Singh Yadav of Aam Aadmi Party is MLA from this region. In 2012, as part of a government initiative, the Delhi government’s revenue department will step up action to free large tracts of gram sabha land, allotted to the education department for setting up schools.
