= Khan Pur Dhani =

- census town
- Location in India
- Coordinates: 28.7103°N 77.2781°E
- Country: India
- Union Territory: Delhi
- District: North East

Population (2011)
  - Total: 6,994

Languages
  - Official: Hindi
- Time zone: UTC+5:30 (IST)

Khan Pur Dhani is a census town in North East district in the Indian territory of Delhi.
