= Jonapur =

- Town
- Location in India
- Coordinates: 28°27′53″N 77°09′21″E
- Country: India
- State: Delhi
- District: South

Population (2001)
  - Total: 7,419

Languages
  - Official: Hindi, English
- Time zone: UTC+5:30 (IST)

Jonapur is a census town in South district in the Indian state of Delhi.

== Demographics ==
As of 2001 India census, Jonapur had a population of 7,419. Males constitute 57% of the population and females 43%. Jonapur has an average literacy rate of 62%, higher than the national average of 59.5% male literacy is 70%, and female literacy is 51%. In Jonapur, 16% of the population is under 0–6 years of age.
