= Qadi Pur =

Coordinates: 28.773336°N 77.1593214°E

- census town
- Location in India
- Country: India
- Union Territory: Delhi
- District: North West

Population (2011)
  - Total: 18,369

Languages
  - Official: Hindi
- Time zone: UTC+5:30 (IST)

Qadi Pur is a census town in North West district in the Indian territory of Delhi.
