= Karala, Delhi =

Karala
- Village of Delhi
- Location in Delhi, India
- Coordinates: 28.738°N 77.0392°E
- Country: India
- Union Territory: Delhi
- District: North West Delhi

Languages
  - Official: Hindi, English
  - Mother Tongue: Haryanvi, Hindi
- Time zone: UTC+5:30 (IST)
- PIN: 110081
- Civic agency: North Delhi Municipal Corporation

Karala is a village in North West District in Union Territory of Delhi, India. It is surrounded by Rohini Sector 38, Rohini Sector 37, Kanjhawala, Sultanpur Dabas and Madanpur Dabas. Its PIN code is 110081. The Nearest Metro Station are Mundka Metro Station & Rithala Metro Station. Which are Approx. 6 km & 10 km from Karala.Karala is biggest village of Delhi.

== Demographics ==
Karala is the Village of "Mathur Jats" & "Vats Brahmin" the largest advanced urban village in Delhi. Permanent residents of this village include all castes like Jat(Jatt), Brahmins, Balmiki, Chamar etc. but in recent years people from different regions resided here who came in search of better livelihood from different regions of India. The village Karala itself has all religions people, but nearby colonies have people from different states. Karala has population of 35,730 of which 19,085 are males while 16,645 are females as per report released by Census India 2011. The female Sex Ratio is 872 against the state average of 868. The literacy rate of Karala is 86.38%, higher than the state average of 86.21%. In Karala, male literacy is around 92.58% while female literacy rate is 79.32%.

Karala Religion Distribution
Population	Hindu	Muslim	Christian	Sikh	Buddhist	Jain	Others	Non-stated
35,730	94.16%	3.03%	0.29%	1.83%	0.01%	0.62%	0.01%	0.04%

== Economy and urbanization ==
Historically an agricultural settlement, Karala has transitioned into a densely populated urban village (locally referred to as Lal Dora). This demographic shift has diversified the local economy towards small-scale retail, service industries, and rental housing, which now support a significant migrant workforce from various regions of India.

== Transportation ==
Karala village is approximately 5 km from the Mundka Railway Station and Metro Station, the distance between Rithala Metro Station and Karala is 10 km (6.2 miles or 5.4 nautical miles) and almost 7 km from Ghewra Village Railways Station. To reach Karala Village, the DTC bus nos. 114, 114C & 114B 174, 921, 247, 182, 972A, 741, 962A, 962 are available. There's no direct metro service for Karala, though buses are available to board from Pitam Pura, Rithala, and Mundka Metro Stations and from there by taking private buses or DTC and Orange Cluster buses.

== Geography ==
Nearby villages are Kanjhawala, Mohammadpur Majri, Rani Khera, Sultanpur Dabas and Begumpur. Karala has many small settlements namely Shiv Vihar, Anandpur Dham, Rama Vihar etc. Most of the people who know about Karala do not know about its span. Rama Vihar is created by one of the Congress MLA .

== Local ==
The village deity is Dada Mandu. There is a big temple associated with the deity, and is worshiped by not only people of Karala but also by the people from nearby villages and colonies. A big annual feast is organised in his name which is embraced by people across the district. This annual gathering, traditionally known as a bhandara, highlights the socio-religious customs of the local Jat community and surrounding areas.

There is also a big pond adjacent to the temple. Nearing this temple is another beautiful and huge temple of Radha-Krishna, which is also a place of attraction and worship for the locals. There are places of worship for different religions as well, there is a Church, there are Mosques, Gurudwaras, and many more. The village also has a big stadium with a football playground. Karala has its own football club that is KFC (Karala Football Club). The song 'Jo Bhi Main' from the Bollywood movie "Rockstar" has been shot in this stadium on 14 December 2010. There is also a park named as Shaheed Bhagat Singh Park, which is situated in the middle of the village called Bazar Panna, where all the trade union meetings held. On the educational institution front, Karala has a Primary Government School, Girls' Senior Secondary Government School, that arranges afternoon shift for boys as well, and many Private Schools. Karala has its own post office but the S.O. office is in Kanjhawala. Karala has its own water tank attached to the Delhi Jal Board old office. Karala has its own Sanskrit Paathshala, situated in Rama Vihar near the very famous Balaji Temple, one of the oldest Sanskrit schools since the English time. There are hospitals, hotels, eat-outs, banks, ATMs and many more services that are of importance in daily life, are easily accessible here.

== In popular culture ==
Karala has been featured in mainstream media. The village stadium served as a primary filming location for the song "Jo Bhi Main" in the 2011 Bollywood film Rockstar, directed by Imtiaz Ali.

== School ==
Karala SKVis a well known school that offers education for Karala children. Facilities are provided by the Delhi Government.

== Administration ==
The SDM office and the police station are in Kanjhawala. All the judicial activities come under SDM Kanjhawala, New Delhi. All the law and order situations fall under the area of Kanjhawala police station. The MCD councilor seat no. 35 comes under Karala administration. Karala village is in Mundka Assembly Constituency (08).
