= Mirpur Turk =

Tukmeerpur
- city
- Nickname: Gurjar
- Location in Delhi, India
- Coordinates: 28.7133°N 77.2722°E
- Country: India
- Union territory: Delhi
- District: North East Delhi
- Lok Sabha Constituency: North East Delhi

Population (2001)
  - Total: 28,257

Languages
  - Official: Gujari, Hindi, English
- Time zone: UTC+5:30 (IST)
- PIN: 110090

Tukmeerpur is a census town in North East district in the Indian union territory of Delhi.

== Demographics ==
As of 2001 India census, Mirpur Turk had a population of 28,257. Males constitute 54% of the population and females 46%. Mirpur Turk has an average literacy rate of 63%, higher than the national average of 59.5%: male literacy is 71%, and female literacy is 54%. In Mirpur Turk, 17% of the population is under 6 years of age. Tukmirpur is part of dedha chubisi i.e. group of 24 dedha gurjars village. Near by dedha villages are Biharipur, Sherpur Gujran, dayalpur, sadatpur gujran, sabhapur, Illachipur, garhi mandu, khajoori khas, Gamri, Ghonda, Usmanpur, Moujpur,
