= Chilla Saroda Bangar =

- city
- Location in Delhi, India
- Coordinates: 28.59577°N 77.30153°E
- Country: India
- State: Delhi
- District: East Delhi

Population (2001)
  - Total: 65,969

Languages
  - Official: Hindi, English
- Time zone: UTC+5:30 (IST)

Chilla Saroda Bangar is a census town in East Delhi District in the National Capital Territory of Delhi, India.

== Demographics ==
As of 2001 India census, Chilla Saroda Bangar had a population of 65,969. Males constitute 56% of the population and females 44%. Chilla Saroda Bangar has an average literacy rate of 70%, higher than the national average of 59.5%; with male literacy of 76% and female literacy of 62%. 16% of the population is under 6 years of age.
