= Bhor Garh =

- census town
- Location in India
- Country: India
- Union Territory: Delhi
- District: North West

Population (2011)
  - Total: 8,627

Languages
  - Commonly used: Hindi, Khariboli or Haryanvi
- Time zone: UTC+5:30 (IST)
- Postal code: 110040

Bhor Garh is a census town in North West district in the Indian territory of Delhi.

== Demography ==
In the 2011 census, Bhor Garh had 1,765 houses with a population of 8,627, consisting of 4,815 males and 3,812 females. The population of children aged 0–6 was 1,276, making up 14.79% of the total population of the village. The average sex ratio was 792 out of 1000, which is lower than the state average of 868 out of 1000. The child sex ratio in the village was 815 out of 1000, which is lower than the average of 871 out of 1000 in the territory of Delhi. There are 83.06% Hindus, 12.87% Muslims, 3.92% Sikhs, 0.10% Christians and 0.05% Buddhists residing in it. The total Scheduled Castes and Scheduled Tribes population in the town was 1,236 people and all were Scheduled Castes. There are no people of the Scheduled Tribe in the town.

== Accessibility ==
The closest nearby towns are Shahpur Garhi (2.9 km) and Alipur (6.7 km), Bawana (8.1 km) etc. Nearby hospitals include Satyawadi Raja Harish Chandra Hospital (4.1 km). There are two government aided schools, out of which one is a primary school and other is a senior secondary school, both affiliated by the CBSE. Nearby private schools and institutions include Lala Hans Raj Gupta ITI and L.K. International School.

== Politics ==
Raj Kumar Khatri of the Bharatiya Janata Party is the incumbent MLA from the area after the 2025 Delhi Legislative Assembly election under which Bhor Garh falls.
