= Rani Khera, Sareni =

Rani Khera Rāni Khera
- Village
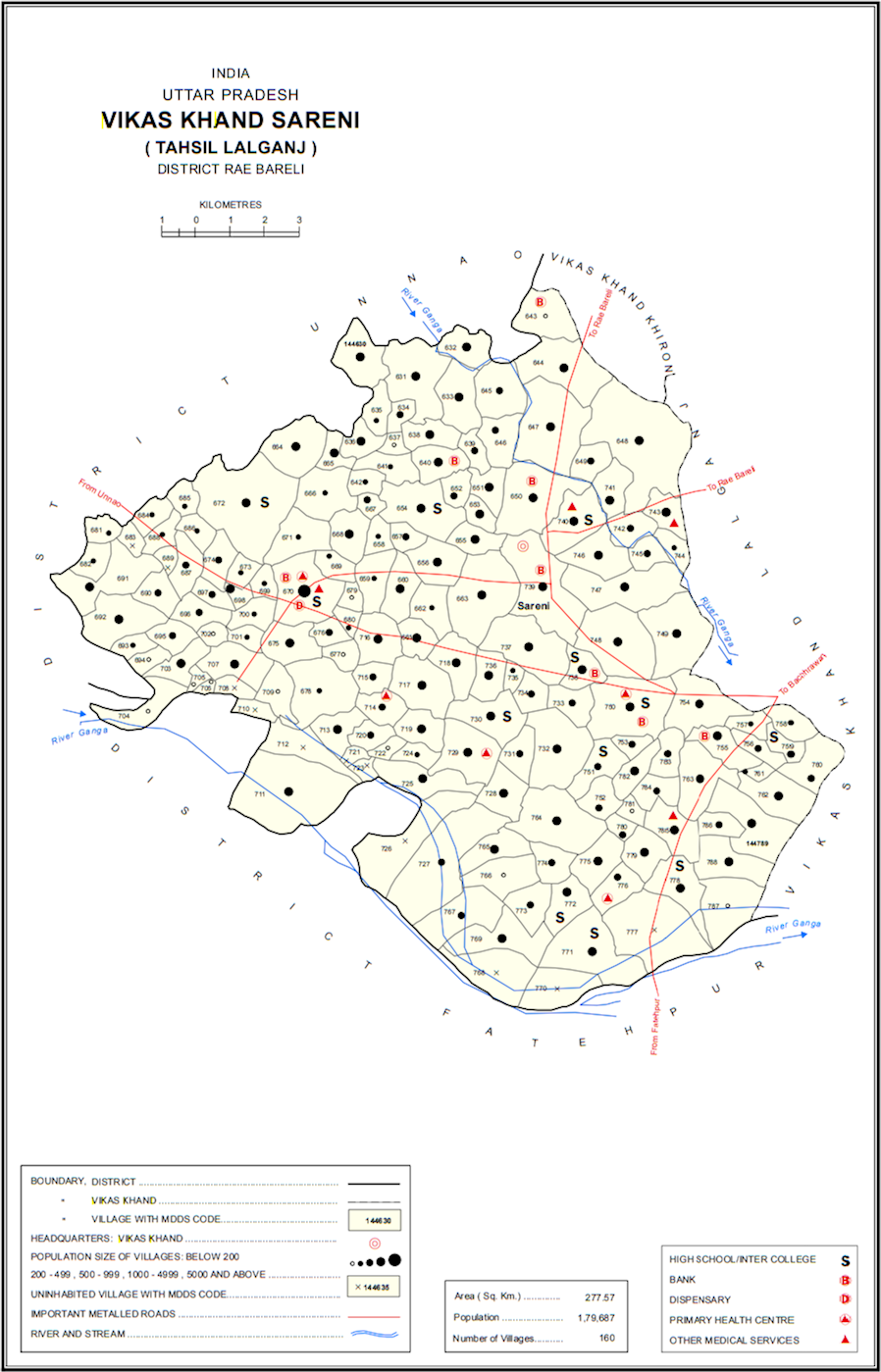
- Map showing Rani Khera (#661) in Sareni CD block

- Location in Uttar Pradesh, India
- Coordinates: 26.131507°N 80.792956°E
- Country: India
- State: Uttar Pradesh
- District: Raebareli

Area
  - Total: 1.187 km^{2} (0.458 sq mi)

Population (2011)
  - Total: 1,451
  - Density: 1,222/km^{2} (3,166/sq mi)

Languages
  - Official: Hindi
- Time zone: UTC+5:30 (IST)
- Vehicle registration: UP-35

Rani Khera is a village in Sareni block of Rae Bareli district, Uttar Pradesh, India. It is located 27 km from Lalganj, the tehsil headquarters. As of 2011, it has a population of 1,451 people, in 278 households. It has one primary school and no healthcare facilities. It belongs to the nyaya panchayat of Murarmau.

The 1951 census recorded Rani Khera as comprising three hamlets, with a population of 663 people (344 male and 319 female), in 127 households and 111 physical houses. The area of the village was given as 316 acres. 80 residents were literate, all but four of them males. The village was listed as belonging to the pargana of Sareni and the thana of Sareni.

The 1961 census recorded Rani Khera as comprising two hamlets, with a total population of 815 people (381 male and 434 female), in 137 households and 126 physical houses. The area of the village was given as 319 acres.

The 1981 census recorded Rani Khera as having a population of 1,047 people, in 166 households, and having an area of 124.23 hectares. The main staple foods were given as wheat and rice.

The 1991 census recorded Rani Khera as having a total population of 1,357 people (720 male and 637 female), in 238 households and 238 physical houses. The area of the village was listed as 123 hectares. Members of the 0-6 age group numbered 237, or 17% of the total; this group was 52% male (124) and 48% female (113). Members of scheduled castes made up 19% of the village's population, while no members of scheduled tribes were recorded. The literacy rate of the village was 54% (469 men and 268 women). 584 people were classified as main workers (389 men and 195 women), while no workers were classified as marginal workers; the remaining 773 residents were non-workers. The breakdown of main workers by employment category was as follows: 223 cultivators (i.e. people who owned or leased their own land); 222 agricultural labourers (i.e. people who worked someone else's land in return for payment); 19 workers in livestock, forestry, fishing, hunting, plantations, orchards, etc.; no workers in mining and quarrying; 26 household industry workers; one worker employed in other manufacturing, processing, service, and repair roles; one construction worker; 15 employed in trade and commerce; three employed in transport, storage, and communications; and 74 in other services.
