= Nithari Village (Delhi) =

Nithari (Baljit Vihar, Delhi) Nithari Village
- Neighbourhood
- Location in Delhi, India
- Coordinates: 28.706206°N 77.055732°E
- Country: India
- State: Delhi
- District: North West Delhi

Languages
  - Official: Hindi, English
  - Mother Tongue: Haryanvi
- Time zone: UTC+5:30 (IST)
- PIN: 110086
- Civic agency: North Delhi Municipal Corporation

Nithari Village (Baljit Vihar, Delhi), popularly known as Nithari Village (not to be confused by the Nithari Village in Noida). Nithari lies in the Kirari Suleman Nagar Constituency.

As of 2011, the population of Nithari Village was 50464 inhabitants, of which 27213 were male and 23251 were female. As of 2023, the village's estimated population was approximately 67000.

== Gallery ==
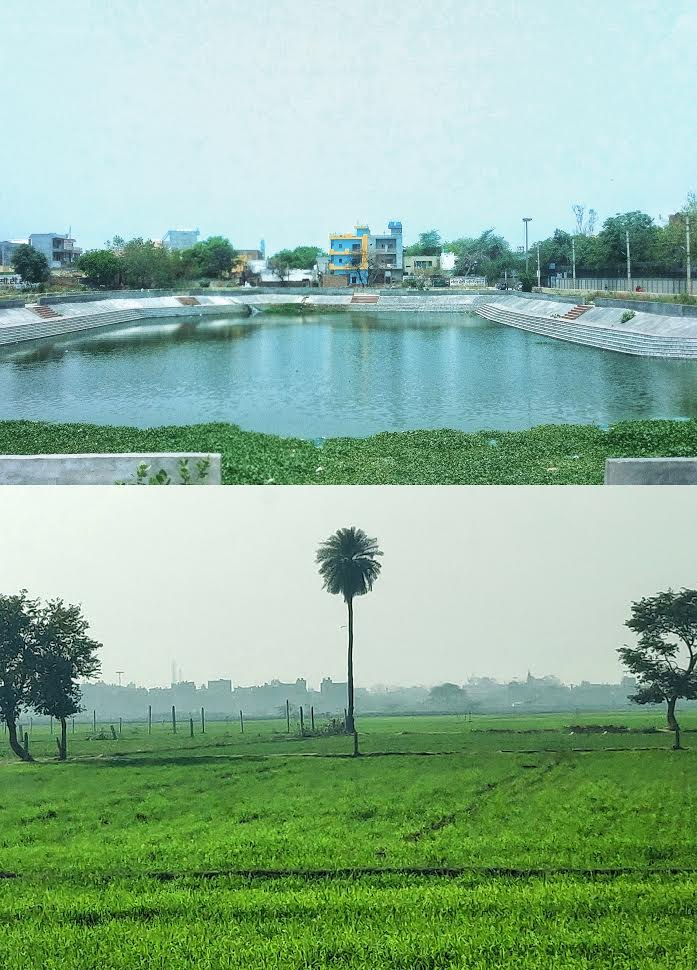
Village Nithari

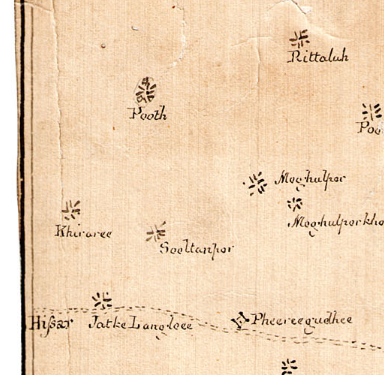
Khiraree or Kirari by which Nithari was formed in Sketch of the Environs of Delhi, 1807. National Archives of India
