= Mandoli, Delhi =

Mandoli
- Town
- Location in India
- Country: India
- Union Territory: Delhi
- District: Shahdara

Population (2011)
  - Total: 120,417

Languages
  - Official: Hindi
- Time zone: UTC+5:30 (IST)

Mandoli is a town in Shahdara district in the Indian territory of Delhi. It is an early historic site in east Delhi. It is towards east of Yamuna River near Nand Nagari about 14 km from Delhi Railway Station on Delhi-Ghaziabad highway. Its PIN code is 110093.

Mandoli has one of 3 prison complexes within Delhi, other being Tihar Prisons and Rohini.

== See also ==
- Tihar Prisons
