= Taj Pul =

- city
- Location in India
- Coordinates: 28.5549°N 77.1919°E
- Country: India
- State: Delhi
- District: South

Population (2001)
  - Total: 58,220

Languages
  - Official: Hindi, English
- Time zone: UTC+5:30 (IST)

Taj Pul is a census town in South district in the Indian union territory of Delhi.

== Demographics ==
As of 2001 India census, Taj Pul had a population of 58,220. Males constitute 56% of the population and females 44%. Taj Pul has an average literacy rate of 69%, higher than the national average of 59.5%: male literacy is 77%, and female literacy is 59%. In Taj Pul, 17% of the population is under 6 years of age.
