= Dallupura =

- Village
- Location in Delhi, India Dallupura (India)
- Coordinates: 28.6004°N 77.3194°E
- Country: India
- State: Delhi
- District: East Delhi

Population (2001)
  - Total: 132,628

Languages
  - Official: Hindi, English
- Time zone: UTC+5:30 (IST)
- PIN: 110096
- Vehicle registration: DL

Dallupura is a village situated in the Mayur Vihar Phase III area of the East Delhi district of Delhi, India. It falls under Kondli Assembly constituency and East Delhi Lok Sabha constituency.

== History ==
Gujars of Dedha and Rajputs Of Uttrakhand are landholding community of this village.

== Educational institutions ==
Cosmos Public School, Evergreen Public School, Somerville School and Starex International School, Dashmesh Public School.

Maharaja Agrasen College, affiliated to Delhi University (DU), is also situated in this region.

== Demographics ==
Historical population
Year	Pop.	±%
2001	132,621	—
2011	154,791	+16.7%
Source: Government of India

As of 2001 India census, Dallupura had a population of 132,628. Males constitute 54% of the population and females 46%. Dallupura has an average literacy rate of 65%, higher than the national average of 59.5%: male literacy is 73% and, female literacy is 56%. In Dallupura, 15% of the population is under 6 years of age.
