= Kirari Suleman Nagar =

Kirari Nagar Kirari Village
- Neighbourhood
- Location in Delhi, India
- Coordinates: 28.6968°N 77.0644°E
- Country: India
- State: Delhi
- District: North West Delhi

Languages
  - Official: Hindi, English
  - Mother Tongue: Haryanvi
- Time zone: UTC+5:30 (IST)
- PIN: 110086
- Civic agency: North Delhi Municipal Corporation

Kirari village is an urban village originally settled by Jat kings of Bharatpur State. It lies in the north west of Delhi. The surrounding area and some parts of the village itself are now heavily urbanized and industrialized.

Waves of migrants from Bihar and UP came in 1999s to 2020. A lot of migrants are now settled in the village.

The current MLA of Kirari is Anil Jha Vats. The federal president of Kirari RWA Federation is Ajay Vats.

== History ==
Kirari first officially appeared as Khiraree on the map found in the National Archives of India which shows Delhi in 1807, shortly after the arrival of the British in 1803. It highlights the hierarchy of settlements, from small to larger villages.

On 15 August 1947, when India became independent, the Government of India formed the Matsya Union by combining Alwar, Bharatpur, Dholpur and Karauli from the princely states of Rajputana, and formed Rajasthan by merging the remaining princely states. In June 1949, the four princely states of Matsya Union were also merged in Rajasthan. On behalf of the state of Bharatpu.

Lateron Village Nithari was created from the Kirari.

== Gallery ==
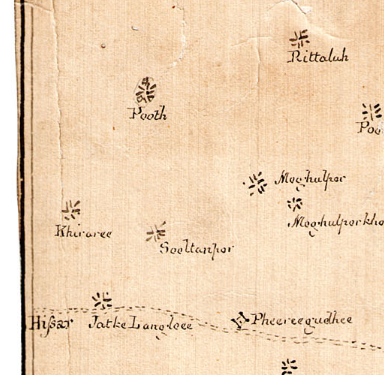
(Khiraree) or Kirari in Sketch of the Environs of Delhi, 1807. National Archives of India.

== Demography ==
As of 2012 India census, Kirari Suleman Nagar had a population of 154633 (2001). Males constituted 55% of the population and females 45%. Kirari Suleman Nagar had an average literacy rate of 49%, less than the national average of 59.5%: male literacy was 51%, and female literacy was 38%. In Kirari Suleman Nagar, 20% of the population were under 6 years of age. This is a census town in the North West district in the Indian state of Delhi.
