= Gokal Pur =

- Village
- Location in India
- Coordinates: 28°42′36″N 77°16′48″E
- Country: India
- State: Delhi
- District: North East

Population (2001)
  - Total: 90,564

Languages
  - Official: Hindi, English
- Time zone: UTC+5:30 (IST)
- PIN: 110094

Gokulpur is a historically significant, medium-sized village located in the Shahdara region of the Union Territory of Delhi, India. Situated approximately 7 miles east of Delhi on the Delhi–Saharanpur Road and near the banks of the Yamuna River, it lies close to the Delhi–Uttar Pradesh border. Dominated and inhabited in modern day and historically by Jindhad clan/gotra Gurjars.

== Demographics ==
Historical population
Year	Pop.	±%
1981	14,972	—
1991	49,186	+228.5%
2001	91,159	+85.3%
2011	121,870	+33.7%
Source: Government of India

As of 2001 India census, Gokal Pur had a population of 90,564. Males constitute 54% of the population and females 46%. Gokal Pur has an average literacy rate of 58%, lower than the national average of 59.5%: male literacy is 63%, and female literacy is 52%. In Gokal Pur, 12% of the population is under 6 years of age.
