= Mustafabad, Delhi =

Mustafabad
- Neighborhood
- Location in Delhi, India
- Coordinates: 28.71115°N 77.2688°E
- Country: India
- State: Delhi
- District: North East Delhi
- Lok Sabha Constituency: North East Delhi
- Vidhan Sabha Constituency: Mustafabad
- Named for: Mustafabad name established in the memory of saint HAZRAT MUSTAFA BABA whose shrine is presently situated inside the Mustafabad kabristan, formerly name is RAJIV GANDHI NAGAR.

Government
  - MP: Manoj Tiwari
  - MLA: Mohan Singh Bisht

Population (2015)
  - Total: 189,117

Languages
  - Official: Hindi, English, Urdu
- Time zone: UTC+5:30 (IST)
- PIN: 110094

Mustafabad, is a census town in the North East district of Delhi, a union territory of India.

== Demographics ==
Historical population
| Year | Pop. | ±% |
|---|---|---|
| 2001 | 90,171 | — |
| 2011 | 127,167 | +41.0% |
Source: Government of India

As of the 2001 India census, Mustafabad has a population of 89,117. Males constitute 53% of the population and females 47% in Mustafabad. Mustafabad has an average literacy rate of 74%, higher than the national average of 59.5%. Male literacy is 63%, and female literacy is 44%. Twenty per cent of the population is under 6 years of age.

Mustafabad consists of Old Mustafabad, New Mustafabad.
