= Deoli, Delhi =

Deoli Devli gram
- Urbanised village situated in South Delhi
- Location in India
- Coordinates: 28.50207°N 77.22862°E
- Country: India
- State: Delhi
- District: South
- Named for: 'Dev' means gods and hence Deoli/Devli means Gods place

Government
  - Body: State government of Delhi

Population (2001)
  - Total: 119,432

Languages
  - Official: Hindi, English
- Time zone: UTC+5:30 (IST)
- Postal code: 110080

Deoli also, (Devli) is a census town in the South district of the state of Delhi, India.

== Demographics ==
Historical population
Year	Pop.	±%
1981	5,788	—
1991	33,214	+473.8%
2001	119,468	+259.7%
2011	169,122	+41.6%
Source: Government of India

As of 2001 India census, Deoli had a population of 119,432. Deoli is Jat village with more than 40,000 Jat people. Males constitute 56% of the population and females 44%. Deoli has an average literacy rate of 64%, higher than the national average of 59.5%: male literacy is 73% and, female literacy is 54%. In Deoli, 19% of the population is under 6 years of age.
