= Sultanpur Majra =

Sultan Pur Majra
- census town/village
- Location in India
- Coordinates: 28°41′53″N 77°04′08″E
- Country: India
- State: Delhi
- District: North West

Population (2001)
  - Total: 163,716

Languages
  - Official: Hindi, English
- Time zone: UTC+5:30 (IST)
- PIN: 110083

Sultanpur Majra is a census town in Sultanpuri in North West district in the Indian Union Territory of Delhi.

== Demographics ==
Historical population
Year	Pop.	±%
1981	56,058	—
1991	111,567	+99.0%
2001	164,426	+47.4%
2011	181,554	+10.4%
Source: Government of India

As of 2001 India census, Sultan Pur Majra had a population of 163,716. Males constitute 54% of the population and females 46%. Sultan Pur Majra has an average literacy rate of 61%, higher than the national average of 59.5%: male literacy is 69%, and female literacy is 51%. In Sultan Pur Majra, 16% of the population is under 6 years of age.
