= Bhalswa Jahangir Pur =

- village
- Location in India
- Coordinates: 28.73542°N 77.16383°E
- Country: India
- State: Delhi
- District: North West

Population (2001)
  - Total: 151,427

Languages
  - Official: Hindi, English
- Time zone: UTC+5:30 (IST)

Bhalswa Jahangir Pur is a census town in North West district in the state of Delhi, India, it is situated next to Bhalswa horseshoe lake.

== Demographics ==
Historical population
Year	Pop.	±%
1981	70,301	—
1991	95,065	+35.2%
2001	152,339	+60.2%
2011	197,148	+29.4%
2025	292,000	+48.1%
Source: Government of India

The provisional figures for the 2001 Census of India recorded Bhalswa Jahangir Pur having a population of 151,427. Males constituted 55% of the population and females 45%. The average literacy rate was 59%, lower than the national average of 59.5%; with 62% of the males and 38% of the females literate. 17% of the population was under 6 years of age. Its a land of Yadav community majorly. The concillor of this area is Ajeet Singh Yadav (2026) and Aheer Deepak Chaudhary is the MLA (2026).
