= Hastsal =

Suburb of New Delhi, India

- city
- Location in India
- Coordinates: 28.634°N 77.053°E
- Country: India
- State: Delhi
- District: West

Population (2011)
  - Total: 176,877

Languages
  - Official: Hindi, English
- Time zone: UTC+5:30 (IST)
- Vehicle registration: DL4s

Hastsal is a census town and village in the West Delhi district of the Union Territory of Delhi, India.

== History ==
According to legend, this area was once submerged in water and served as a resting place for elephants. In Hindi, elephants are known as "Hathi" and place is known as "Sthal"; hence, Hastsal: the resting place of elephants.

In the 17th century, Mughal Emperor Shahjahan had a hunting lodge in Hastsal. In 1650, he built the Mini Qutub Minar close to his hunting lodge. The tower is a 55-foot (17 m) high minaret, locally popular as Hastsal ki Laat or the Hastsal Minaret. It is now situated at a corner of the village and is popularly known as the Laat (Pillar). The minaret and hunting lodge still exist but lie abandoned and crumbling, suffering from neglect. The minaret closely resembles the Qutub Minar in design, and was inspired by it.

== Demographics ==
Historical population
Year	Pop.	±%
2001	86,556	—
2011	176,877	+104.3%
Source: Government of India

As of 2011 India census, Hastsal had a population of 176,877. Males constitute 55% of the population and females 45%. Hastsal has a literacy rate of 83.71 %, male literacy is 90.51%, and female literacy is 75.84%. In Hastsal, 18% of the population is under 6 years of age.
