= Nangloi Jat =

Nangloi Jat Nangloi
- Urban city
- Location within Delhi Location within India
- Coordinates: 28°41′00″N 77°04′00″E
- Country: India
- State: Delhi
- District: West

Population (2001)
  - Total: 150,371

Languages
  - Official: Hindi, English
- Time zone: UTC+5:30 (IST)
- Postal code: 110041

Nangloi Gaon popularly known as "Nangloi Jat", is a locality in West district in the Union Territory of Delhi in India, surrounded by Paschim Vihar, Delhi Outer Ring road and Najafgarh.

Hastsal ki Laat is situated at corner of Hastsal village near Nangloi, popularly known as the Laat, the 75-feet high minar (tower) was built by Mughal Emperor Shahjahan in 1650 and served as his hunting lodge. It resembles the Qutub Minar in design and is also made with red sandstone.

== Demographics ==
Historical population
Year	Pop.	±%
1981	37,623	—
1991	76,063	+102.2%
2001	150,948	+98.5%
2011	205,596	+36.2%
Source: Government of India

As of 2001 India census, Nangloi had a population of 150,371. Males constitute 55% of the population and females 45%. Nangloi has an average literacy rate of 63%, higher than the national average of 59.5%: male literacy is 71%, and female literacy is 53%. 17% of the population is under 6 years of age.
