= Alipur, Delhi =

Alipur (haripur)
- Village
- Location in India
- Coordinates: 28.80°N 77.150°E
- Country: India
- State: Delhi
- District: Outer North Delhi
- Elevation: 209 m (686 ft)

Population (2001)
  - Total: 16,623

Languages
  - Official: Hindi, English
- Time zone: UTC+5:30 (IST)
- Postal code: 110036

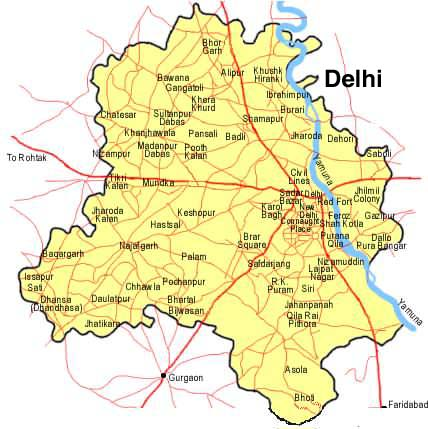
Map of Delhi showing location of Alipur

Alipur is the administrative headquarters and a sub-division of Outer North Delhi district in the state of Delhi, India. It is surrounded by the localities of Bawana, Narela, Budhpur, Bakoli and Mukhmelpur. Alipur falls under the Narela constituency. The nearest metro station is Jahangirpuri Metro Station. Alipur is situated on the Delhi-Amritsar National Highway 1. During the Indian Rebellion of 1857 over 70 Jats were martyred fighting against the British for their nation.

== Demographics ==
Historical population
Year	Pop.	±%
1981	6,735	—
1991	9,256	+37.4%
2001	16,631	+79.7%
2011	20,332	+22.3%
Source: Government of India

As of 2001 Indian census, Alipur had a population of 16,623. Males constitute 58% of the population and females, 42%. It has an average literacy rate of 68%, higher than the national average of 59.5%; 63% for males and 37% for females. 15% of the population is below six years of age. Alipur is home to many migrants from all over India, similar to the rest of Delhi, which has led to a spike in the population in the last decade.

== Education ==
Alipur has many types of education with various government schools, public or private schools, colleges, university and institutions.

=== Universities ===
- Delhi University

=== Colleges ===
- Swami Shraddhanand College

=== Govt. Schools ===
- Government Boys Senior Secondary School
- Government Sarvodaya Boys and Girls Senior Secondary School
- Municipal Corporation Primary (Boys) Model School
- Municipal Corporation Primary Model (Girls) School

== Neighboring villages ==
- Budhpur Bijapur
- Holambi Khurd
- Kham Pur
- Kureni
- Palla
- Bakhtawar Pur
- Bakoli
- Bhor Garh
- Hamid Pur
- Hiranki
- Holambi Kalan
- Khera Kalan
- Khera Khurd
- Zind Pur
- Taj Pur Kalan
- Tikri Khurd
- Shah Pur Garhi
- Mukhmel Pur
- Singhola
- Siras Pur
- Narela
- Singhu
- Kadipur
