= Chhawla forest =

Forest area in India

Coordinates: 28.551°N 77.017°E

Chhawla or Najafgarh drain city forest consists of forestry plantations near the town of Chhawla on both embankments of Najafgarh drain, which is the delhi-end of Sahibi River originating from Aravalli Range mountain in Rajasthan, flowing along the border of Haryana state and south west Delhi in India before converging with Yamuna. It provides refuge to local and migratory wildlife specially waterfowl and other water birds. The area is a subset of the entire Najafgarh drain in rural south west Delhi with forested plantations on both its embankments which has been proposed as the Najafgarh drain bird sanctuary.

== History ==
Delhi Chief Minister Sheila Dikshit inaugurated the city forest at Chhawla on the banks of the Najafgarh drain in South-West Delhi on Saturday 28 Jun 2008. Over 12,000 saplings were planted including 1,000 saplings by school children. In all, nine city forests in different parts of Delhi were set up and 18 lakh saplings were planted during that greening drive in Delhi. Chhawla city forest covers a 12-hectare terrain that originally belonged to the Irrigation and Flood Control Department and a boundary wall has been constructed around it.

== Najafgarh drain or nullah ==
The Najafgarh drain or Najafgarh Nallah (nullah in Hindi means drain) is just another name for the River Sahibi which continues its flow through Delhi, it is a tributary to River Yamuna in which it outfalls here. Within Delhi it is erroneously called "Najafgarh drain" or "Najafgarh Nallah"', it gets this name from the once famous and huge Najafgarh Jheel (lake) near the town of Najafgarh in southwest Delhi and within urbanized Delhi it is the Indian Capital's most polluted water body due to direct inflow of untreated sewage from surrounding populated areas. A January 2005 report by the Central Pollution Control Board clubs this drain with 13 other highly polluted wetlands under category ‘‘D ’’ for assessing the water quality of wetlands in wildlife habitats.

== Forested embankments ==
The Najafgarh drain has been much widened over the past decades and now has thick mud embankments on both its sides to channel the waters and protect Delhi from floods, these embankments have been planted with thick forest cover which serve as a much needed habitat for remnant local wildlife occurring in nearby and surrounding farmlands including common foxes, jackals, hares, wild cats, nilgai, porcupines and various reptiles and snakes including the dreaded cobras. Many local birds including waterbirds roost and nest in these trees.

Sections of the forested embankments of Najafgarh drain are currently classified as and are featured in Protected Forests and RECORDED FORESTS (NOTIFIED FOREST AREAS IN DELHI) as "M. P. Green area Najafgarh Drain (Tagore garden)", "Afforestation M.P.Green Area Najafgarh Drain (DDA)" and "Chhawla or Najafgarh drain city forest (29.64 Acre)".

== Accessibility: Drivable road on embankment ==
There is a well kept drivable inspection road maintained by Irrigation and Flood Control Department of Delhi on one of the drains embankment throughout its entire length of several kilometers running through rural Delhi from Dhansa regulators at the southwest border of Delhi with the state of Haryana to where the drain crosses under the outer ring road at Keshopur bus depot near the Najafgarh road between the housing colonies of Vikaspuri and Tilak Nagar in New Delhi.

Wildlife and waterbirds can be easily viewed from vehicles by driving on this road and stopping intermittently and going down to the waters edge. As the width of the drain is limited the flocks of waterfowl and other waterbirds in the drain can be easily observed from the drain's edges and this same fact makes the birds much more vulnerable to hunting as they remain in easy reach of the poacher's shotguns and the nets and traps set for them by local villagers and professional trappers.

== Najafgarh Bird Sanctuary and wetland ecosystem ==
Wetland ecosystem and wildlife habitat important to migratory waterbirds and local wildlife

The Najafgarh drain has been much widened over the years to drain all the water which in earlier decades use to collect in the Nagafgarh Jheel basin this was supposedly done to remove the threat of flooding in Delhi and now the drain itself acts as an elongated water body or lake with trees planted on both its embankments with an inspection road running on one embankment. During the winter months it attracts vast quantities of migratory birds and also supports local wildlife yearlong. Due to the rich wildlife observed in and around the less polluted stretch of the drain outside of congested populated areas it has been proposed as a Bird Sanctuary for Delhi.

The wetland ecosystem and wildlife habitat on several kilometers of less polluted Najafgarh drain in rural Delhi before entering the main city including the former Najafgarh lake or Najafgarh jheel area is very important habitat to migratory waterbirds as well as local wildlife and has been earmarked to be declared a Bird sanctuary for Delhi. The area came to be recognized as an important wildlife habitat after a local naturalist studying the area during 1986-88 called attention to it recommending it to be conserved as a bird sanctuary after which the Delhi wildlife department posted 16 guards in the area to control illegal bird hunters including diplomats from various international embassies located in Delhi, India's capital. Delhi Administration officials were tasked with declaring about 25 km stretch of the drain in rural delhi, including where is passes through the core area of the now drained Najafgarh Lake, "protected" under the "Wildlife Act" after Lt.-Governor of Delhi Mr. H.L. Kapur was invited to the area for touring the site where he also heard accounts of local villagers about the rampant illegal hunting of waterbirds that went on here every year. The existing staff of the Flood Control and Irrigation Department numbering about 40 were also given the additional responsibility of protecting the wildlife on and around the drain.

== See also ==
- Arid Forest Research Institute
- Najafgarh drain bird sanctuary
- Najafgarh drain
- Masani barrage
