= Bakoli, Delhi =

Bakoli
- Village
- Location within Delhi
- Coordinates: 28.8160°N 77.1420°E
- Country: India
- Union Territory: Delhi
- District: North Delhi

Government
  - Type: Government
  - Body: Government of National Capital Territory of Delhi
- Elevation: 217 m (712 ft)

Languages
  - Official: Hindi
- Time zone: UTC+5:30 (IST)
- Alipur: 110036
- Area code: 011

Bakoli is a village listed under Narela tehsil in North Delhi district in the NCT of Delhi. It is located 3 km east from the district headquarters of Alipur and 35 km from New Delhi, the NCT Capital of Delhi.

== Nearby places ==
Khampur (2 km), Mukhmel Pur (3 km), Bakhtawar Pur (3 km ), Khera Kalan (4 km), and Kadipur (5 km) are the closest villages to Bakoli.

Loni, Sonipat, Bahadurgarh, and Delhi are some of the nearest major cities to Bakoli.
