= Najafgarh drain =

Northernmost end of River Sahibi

Coordinates: 28°31′N 76°36′E

Najafgarh Drain River Sahibi (Northernmost end)
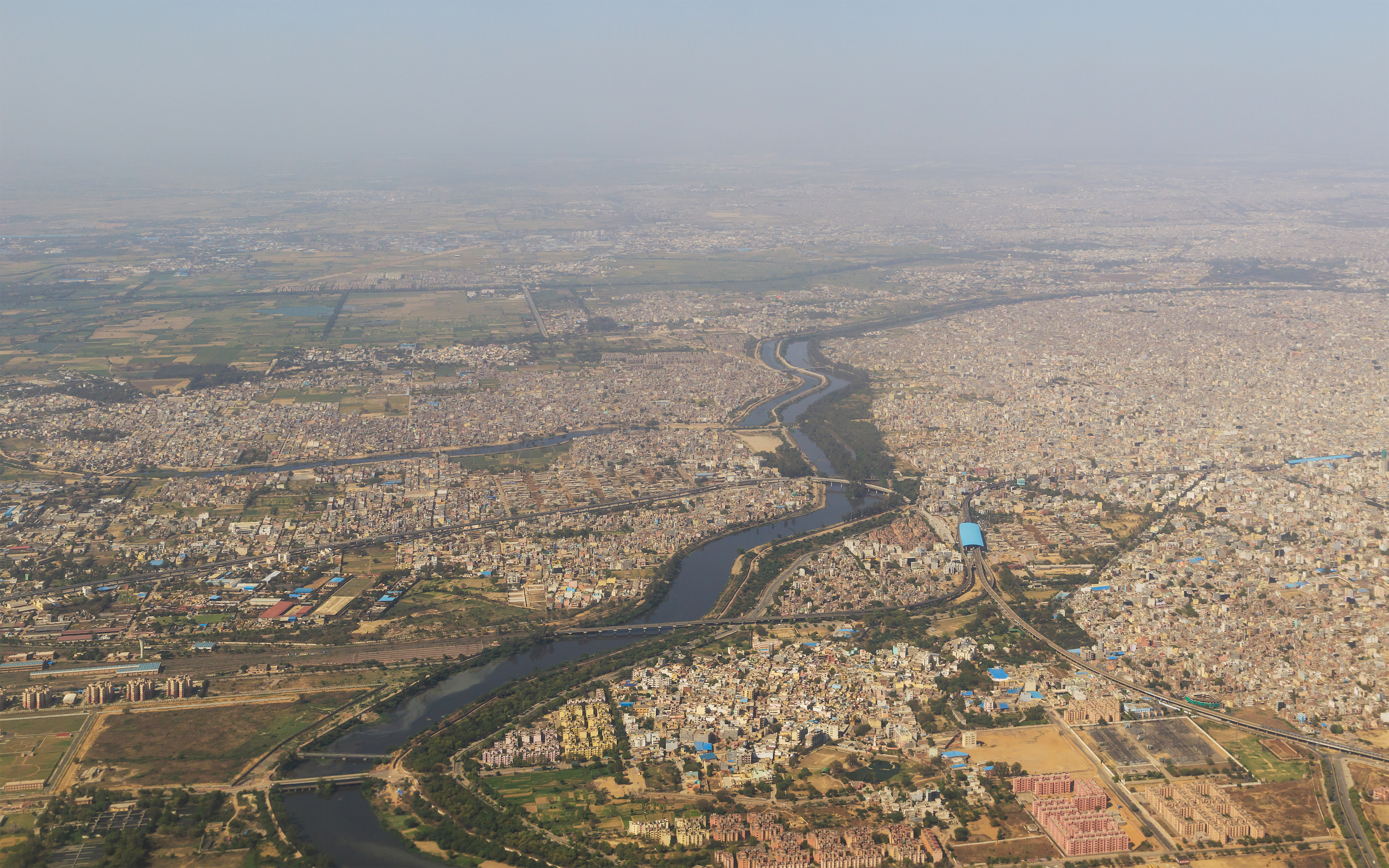
- Aerial view

Location
- Country: India
- City: Delhi

Physical characteristics
- Mouth: Yamuna River
  - location: Delhi, India

Basin features
- River system: Yamuna River
- Landmarks: Najafgarh lake, Najafgarh Drain Bird Sanctuary
- Pollution status: Highly polluted due to sewage inflow

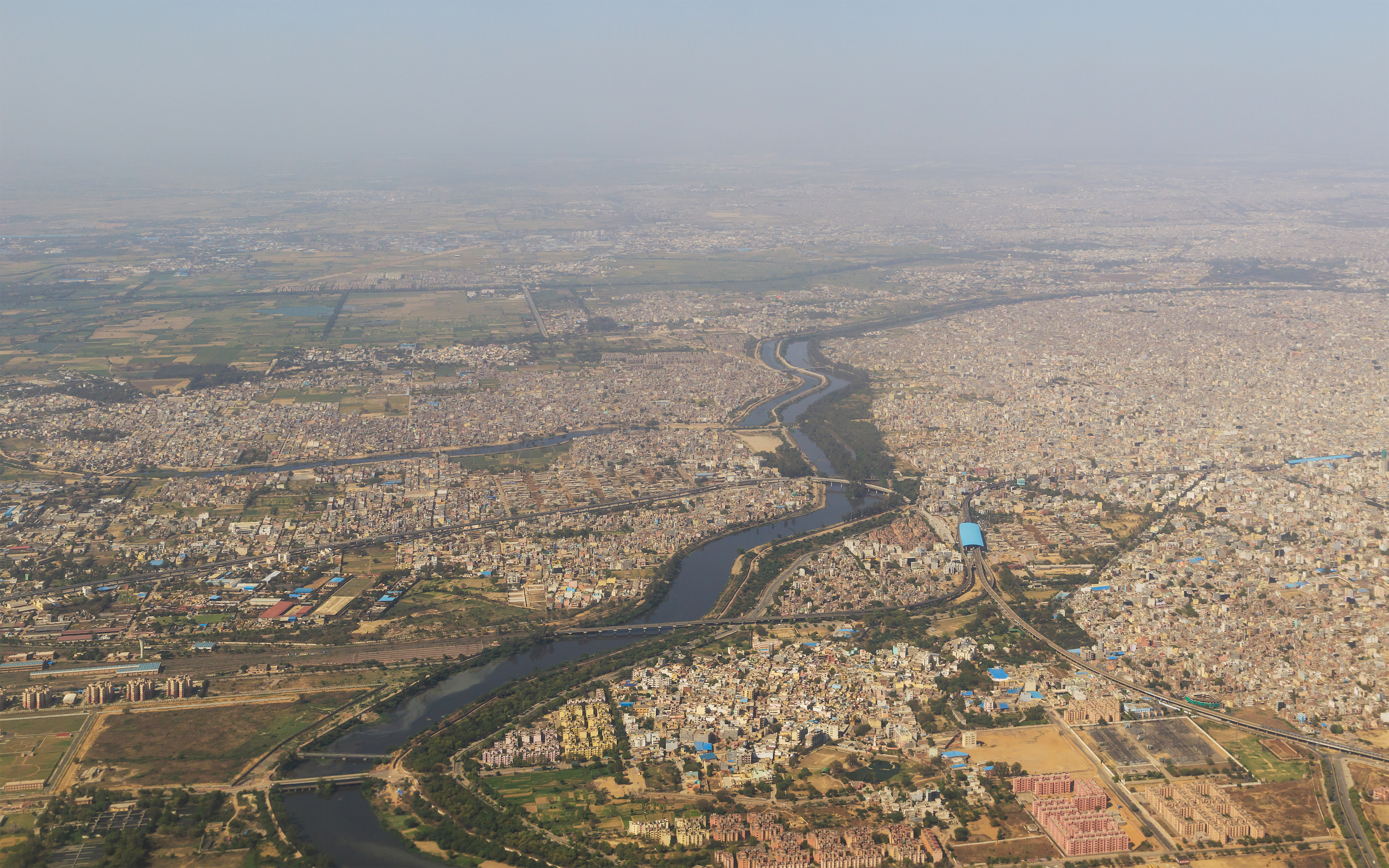
Aerial view

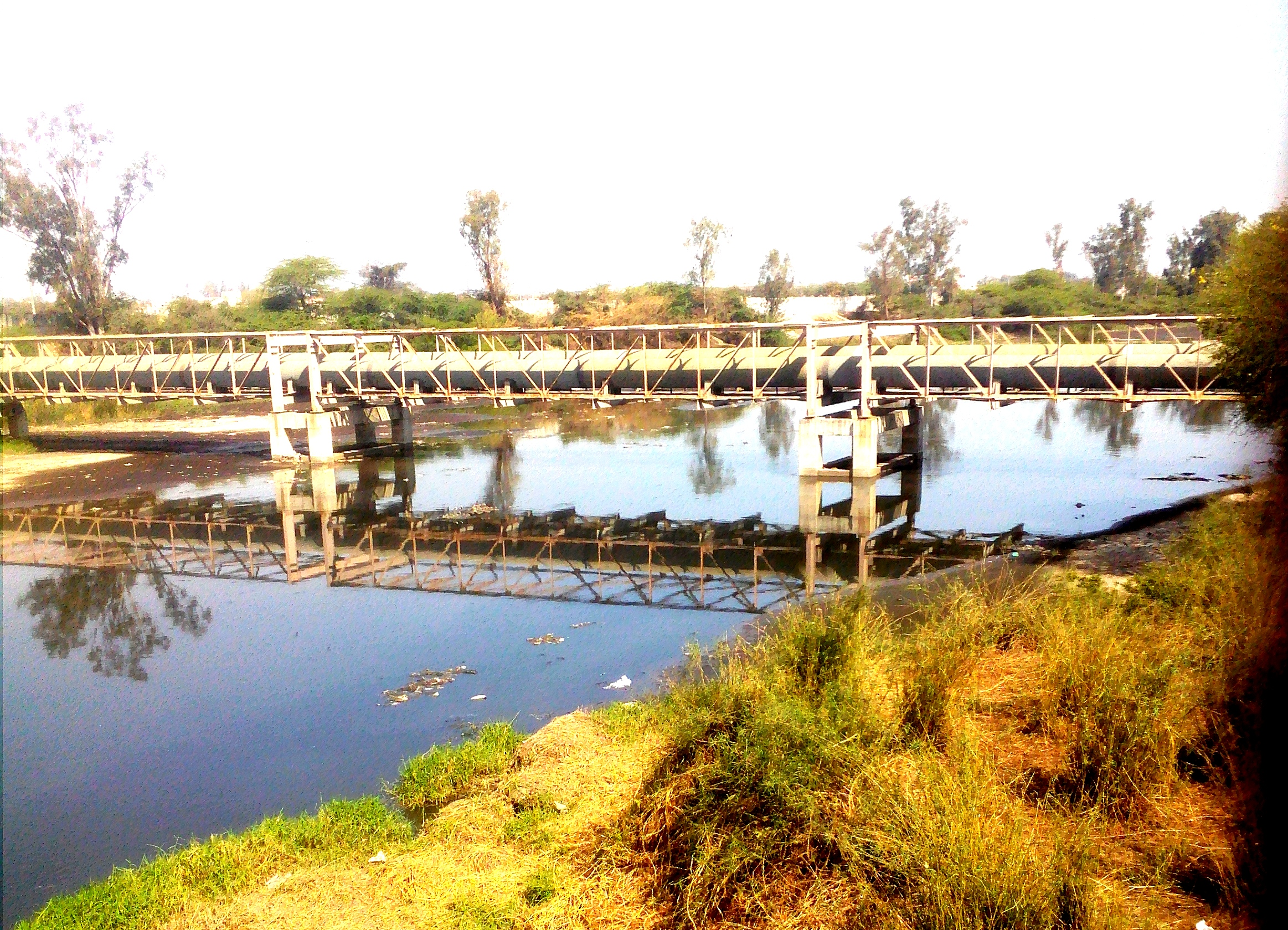
Najafgarh Drain flowing through Kakrola Bridge near Dwarka Sector 16.

The Najafgarh drain or Najafgarh nalah, which also acts as Najafgarh drain bird sanctuary, is another name for the northernmost end of River Sahibi, which continues its flow through Delhi, where it is channelized, and then flows into the Yamuna. Within Delhi, due to its channelization for flood control purposes, it is now erroneously called "Najafgarh drain", and gets this name from the once famous and huge Najafgarh Jheel (lake) near the town of Najafgarh in southwest Delhi and within urbanized Delhi.

== Background ==
=== Etymology ===
Within the National Capital Territory of Delhi (NCT), this channelized waterway misclassified and misnamed as the Najafgarh drain or nullah (nalah in Hindi means rivulet or storm water drain) is the continuation of the Sahibi River and an elongation of the Najafgarh Lake.

=== History ===
During the 1960s and before, the rain-fed Sahibi River, which originates in the Jaipur District of Rajasthan, passing through Alwar District in Rajasthan and Gurgaon District in Haryana, entered Delhi near Dhansa and spilled its overflow in the Najafgarh Lake basin. This overflow created a seasonal lake; an area of more than 300 square kilometres (120 mi^{2}) was submerged in some seasons. This water then continued to flow on the other side, forming a tributary of the River Yamuna. In the following decades, this Sahibi River flow reaching the Dhansa regulators was channelized by digging out a wide drain and connecting it directly to the River Yamuna. This channelization also drained off the seasonal Najafgarh Jheel that had formed there previously. The channelized drain from Dhansa regulators to Keshopur Bus Depot on Outer Ring Road is wide with thick and high embankments. A vast amount of water is retained in this widened drain by closing the Kakrola regulators under Najafgarh Road to recharge the local ground watertable; hence it acts like an elongated lake as well. The drain has been much widened over the years to drain all the water which in earlier decades used to collect in the Nagafgarh Jheel basin; this was supposedly done to remove the threat of flooding in Delhi. Before the draining of this lake in the 1960s by widening of the Najafgarh drain by the Flood control and irrigation department of Delhi the lake in many years filled up a depression more than 300 square kilometres (120 mi^{2}) in rural Delhi, It had an extremely rich wetland ecosystem forming a refuge for vast quantities of waterbirds and local wildlife. The lake was one of the last habitats of the famed and endangered Siberian Crane which has all but vanished from the Indian subcontinent now. Till before independence many British colonial Officers and dignitaries came in large parties for waterfowl hunting every season.

== Hydrology ==
=== Course ===
The 51 km-long Najafgarh drain starts at Dhansa and joins the Yamuna river near Wazirabad. Najafgarh Drain is canalized after Bharat Nagar up to confluence to River Yamuna at Downstream Wazirabad Barrage.

=== Wetland bird sanctuary ===
The wide and deep drain acts as an elongated lake maintaining water-level even during the summer months, leading to recharging of ground water table, and the drain's elongated water body with trees planted on both its embankments acts as a wildlife and bird sanctuary which attracts vast numbers of migratory birds during the winter months and supports local wildlife year-round.

== Infrastructure ==
=== Forested embankments ===
The Najafgarh drain has been much widened over the past decades and now has thick mud embankments on both its sides to channel the waters and protect Delhi from floods. These embankments have been planted with thick forest cover which serve as a much needed habitat for remnant local wildlife occurring in nearby and surrounding farmlands including common foxes, jackals, hares, wild cats, nilgai, porcupines and various reptiles and snakes including the dreaded cobras. Many local birds including waterfowl roost and nest in these trees.

Sections of the forested embankments of Najafgarh drain are currently classified as and are featured in Protected Forests and Recorded Forests (Notified Forest Areas in Delhi) as "M. P. Green area Najafgarh Drain (Tagore garden)", "Afforestation M.P.Green Area Najafgarh Drain (DDA)" and "Chhawla or Najafgarh drain city forest (29.64 Acre)".

=== Embankment highway ===
In May 2025, Delhi government announced construction of a 60.77 km long 2-lane major highway along the left bank of Najafgarh drain, including 5.94 km long Jhatikra-Chhawla in south and 54.83 km long Chhawla-Basai Dara Pur Bridge in north, connecting Dwarka Expressway, Urban Extension Road-II, Outer Ring Road, Inner Ring Road, Pankha Road, etc. The existing drivable minor inspection road maintained by Irrigation and Flood Control Department of Delhi on drain's embankment, from Dhansa regulators at the southwest border of Delhi with the state of Haryana to where the drain crosses under the Outer Ring Road, will be upgraded to 2-lane highway.

== Conservation ==
Irrigation and Flood Control Department of the Delhi Government, de-silted the drain to increase its storage capacity. Regulators at Kakraula and Dhansa retain the water. Presently the brackish water is improving with dilution. By retaining the water in the drain, the aquifers and groundwater table have been recharged and there is more water now for irrigation, enabling farmers 6 kilometres away from the drain to grow crops. Tube wells in the area have been discharging water copiously and in two years the water table is up by a meter.

In January 2026, the Irrigation and Flood Control Department commissioned a Finnish-sourced amphibious multipurpose dredger, the Watermaster, along with three self-propelled hopper barges to desilt the drain and remove sludge, silt and aquatic weeds, with the drain estimated to account for nearly 70% of the total pollution load entering the Yamuna. Officials described the deployment as part of a broader shift toward technology-driven, large-scale, sustained action intended to improve water flow, enhance Delhi’s flood resilience and reduce pollution before it reaches the Yamuna.

== See also ==
- Najafgarh drain bird sanctuary
- Najafgarh lake (Najafgarh jheel), nearby lake
- Najafgarh, town in Delhi
- National Zoological Park Delhi
- Sultanpur National Park, bordering Delhi in adjoining Gurgaon District, Haryana
- Okhla Sanctuary, bordering Delhi in adjoining Uttar Pradesh
- Bhalswa horseshoe lake, Northwest, Delhi
