= Siras =

Siras may refer to:

- Siris (goddess), or Siraš, a Mesopotamian goddess associated with beer
- Surasa, or Siras, a Hindu goddess, mother of the primordial reptilians
- Hmayak Siras (1902–1983), Armenian writer
- Ramchandra Siras (1948–2010), Indian linguist
- SIRAS, a form of isomorphous replacement in crystallography

== See also ==
- Sira (disambiguation)
- Siraspur, a village in Delhi, India
