= Haibat Pur =

Haibatpur is a large village of Yadavs in Delhi and comes under Najafgarh. It is an urbanized village.

== See also ==
- Najafgarh
