= Hamidpur, Delhi =

- Village
- Location within Delhi
- Coordinates: 28.8279°N 77.1476°E
- Country: India
- State: Delhi
- District: North Delhi

Area
  - Total: 343.3 ha (848 acres)

Population (Census 2011)
  - Total: 3,469

Languages
  - Official: Hindi, English, Haryanvi
- Time zone: UTC+5:30 (IST)
- Postal code: 063870

Hamidpur is a village located in Narela tehsil of North Delhi district in the outskirts of Delhi, India. It is situated 9 km (5.6 mi) away from the district headquarters of Alipur and 9 km (5.6 mi) away from Narela.

== Demographics ==
According to Census 2011, the total geographical area of the village is 343.3 hectares (848 acres)s. Hamidpur has a total population of 3,469 and 644 houses. Narela is the nearest town to Hamidpur, and is approximately 9 km (5.6 mi) away.
