= Bhalswa Lake =

Coordinates: 28.743°N 77.171°E

Bhalswa Horseshoe Lake
- Location within Delhi
- Location: Delhi, India
- Type: natural freshwater lake
- Basin countries: India
- Max. length: 4,610 feet (1,410 m)
- Max. width: 1,110 feet (340 m)

Bhalswa Horseshoe Lake, or Bhalswa Jheel, is a lake in northwest Delhi, India. It was originally shaped like a horseshoe, until around half of it was used as a landfill site over the years. Now a low income housing colony, an extension of the nearby town of Bhalswa Jahangir Puri, Mukundpur, has been built on it, destroying the once excellent wetland ecosystem and wildlife habitat of the region which once played host to scores of local and migratory wildlife species, especially waterbirds, including waterfowl, storks and cranes. This horseshoe lake was originally formed when the nearby River Yamuna left behind one of its meandering loops here when it changed course over the years and is now channelled through more defined and fortified embankments and dykes to defend modern Delhi from floods. Bhalswa lake but it's half area under Mukundpur colony

== Destruction of the lake ==
On the west side of the lake on the landfill-reclaimed land stands a housing colony. On the east side is a plantation of a few acres of acacia, babool and keekar trees, offering some habitat to local remnant wildlife.

== Current status ==
Though the lake and its surrounding fields were originally an excellent wetland ecosystem which supported a rich wildlife habitat, the Delhi government of late has converted the lake and started promoting it as a water games/sports facility.

== Other horseshoe lakes in India ==
There is another horseshoe-shaped lake, Ansupa Lake near Saranda hills, situated 100 km west of cuttack district in Orissa, having a length of 16 km.

== See also ==
- Bhalswa Jahangir Pur colony / town, Delhi
- Sahibi river
- Najafgarh drain, Delhi
- Najafgarh drain bird sanctuary, Delhi
- Najafgarh lake, Delhi
- National Zoological Park Delhi
- Okhla Sanctuary, bordering Delhi in adjoining Uttar Pradesh
- River Yamuna
- Sultanpur National Park, bordering Delhi in adjoining Gurgaon District, Haryana
