= Swami Omanand Saraswati =

Indian historian and educator (1911–2003)

Swami Omanand Saraswati (1911, – 23 March 2003) was an educator and collector of ancient artifacts in Haryana, India. He was born in March 1910 in Narela, near Delhi, and died in the same city on 23 March 2003 at the age of 93.

Saraswati was director of the archaeological museum at Jhajjar, to the collections of which he made significant accessions from all over India. He was also a member of the Arya Samaj.

== See also ==
- Arya Samajis
- Hindu reformists
