= Najafgarh Lake =

Lake in Delhi, India

Coordinates: 28.504°N 76.944°E

Najafgarh Lake (Najafgarh Marsh or Najafgarh Jheel), fed by Yamuna's tributary Sahibi River, used to be a vast lake in the south west of Delhi, near the town of Najafgarh, from which it takes its name. After the 1960s the Flood Control Department of Delhi canalised the Najafgarh lake area which came to be known as the Najafgarh drain, which led to the eventually partial drainage of the once huge and ecologically rich Najafgarh lake. The Najafgarh drain itself is designated as the Najafgarh drain bird sanctuary which together with the partially drained Najafgarh Lake and adjoining farmland comprise a rich wetland bird habitat used by hundreds of congregating demoiselle cranes, common cranes, sarus cranes, hares, nilgai, wildcat, common fox, jackal, monitor lizards, various varieties of snakes etc.

== History ==
Despite more than 215 years of existence and progressive deterioration, the lake was formally recognised as a water body under India's Wetland Rules of 2017 only after a ruling by the National Green Tribunal. The lake historically covered a much larger area but has been substantially reduced through agricultural expansion and urban encroachment over time. It sits within the Yamuna watershed, which sustains the capital city region of approximately 46 million people. Researchers have identified Najafgarh Jheel as a strong candidate for designation as a wetland of international significance, owing primarily to its notable ornithological diversity and its strategic position within the migratory flyway network of northern India. Before the draining of this lake in the 1960s by widening of the Najafgarh Drain by the flood control and irrigation department of Delhi the lake in many years filled up a depression more than 300 square kilometres (120 mi^{2}) in rural Delhi. It had an extremely rich wetland ecosystem forming a refuge for vast quantities of waterbirds and local wildlife. The lake was one of the last habitats of the famed and endangered Siberian crane which has all but vanished from the Indian subcontinent now. Till before independence many British colonial officers and dignitaries came in large parties for waterfowl hunting every season.

== Issues ==
Development of major housing colonies in the former Najafgarh lake basin: After the complete draining of the lake in the 1960s the former lake basin was converted into farmland first and by now various large scale housing projects occupy the former lake basin, including Vikaspuri, Uttam Nagar, Pappankalan, Dwarka etc., which have shrunk the overall area of the combined wetland area of Najafgrah Drain Brid Sanctuary and Najafgarh Lake.

== See also ==
- Bhalswa horseshoe lake
- Najafgarh town, Delhi
- Najafgarh drain, Delhi
- Najafgarh drain bird sanctuary on the Najafgarh drain
- National Zoological Park Delhi
- Okhla Sanctuary, bordering Delhi in adjoining Uttar Pradesh
- Sultanpur National Park, bordering Delhi in adjoining Gurgaon District, Haryana
