= Bankner =

- Village in Narela
- Location in India
- Coordinates: 28.84819°N 77.07144°E
- Country: India
- Union Territory: Delhi
- District: North Delhi
- Tehsil: Narela

Government
  - Type: Government
  - Body: Government of National Capital Territory of Delhi

Population (2001)
  - Total: 21,085

Languages
  - Official: Hindi, Haryanvi
- Time zone: UTC+5:30 (IST)
- PIN: 110040
- Website: {{URL|example.com|optional display text}}

Bankner is a village which is situated in Narela tehsil in Narela, North Delhi district in the Union Territory of Delhi, India. It is part of Narela Assembly constituency.

== Demographics ==
Historical population
Year	Pop.	±%
2001	21,089	—
2011	14,788	−29.9%
Source: Government of India

As of 2001 India census, Bankner had a population of 21,085. Males constitute 52% of the population and females 48%. Bankner has an average literacy rate of 80%, higher than the national average of 59.5%; with 85% of the males and 75% of females literate. 16% of the population is under six years of age.
