= Krishna Yadav =

Indian entrepreneur

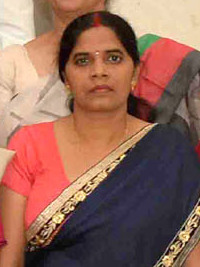
- Krishna at Rashtrapati Bhavan in 2016
- Occupation: pickle manufacturer
- Known for: Nari Shakti Puraskar
- Spouse: GS Yadav
- Children: three

Krishna Yadav is an Indian entrepreneur. She is known for her successful pickle business venture, which she started after receiving training from Krishi Vigyan Kendra in Delhi. Over several years she sold pickles at the roadside and gradually turned her venture into four different entities with a turnover of 40 million INR. She was awarded the Nari Shakti Puraskar in 2016.

== Life ==
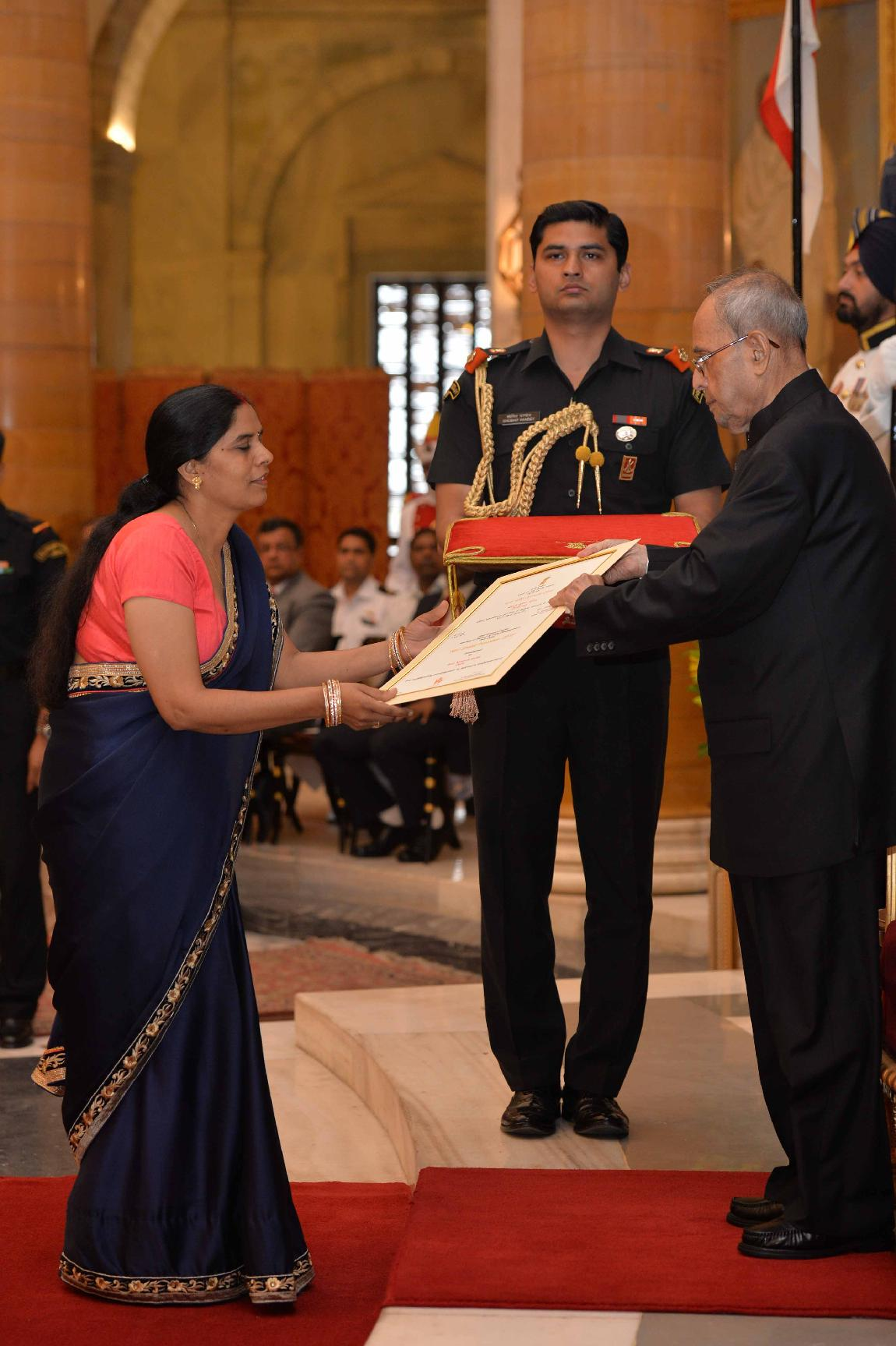
Yadav receiving Nari Shakti Puraskar from the President

Yadav did not attend school and lacks any formal education. She grew up picking crops and when her husband's car business failed, they had to sell their house in Bulandshahr. She decided that they should move to Delhi and borrowed money so her husband could travel ahead and find work. After spending three months, her husband did not find a luck. In such a situation, Yadav decided to join her husband in Delhi and she moved with their three children. After settling at Delhi, they did some vegetable farming but found it difficult to sell. Then she heard about pickles and its prospect as a business but she knew that she would need training for undertaking a pickle business. She attended training at the Krishi Vigyan Kendra in Ujwa village, Delhi.

In 2002 Yadav started to produce pickles. Initially for not being a known brand, she could not arrange to sell them in grocery shops, so her husband sold them at the side of the road, while she used to produce them along with her children. By 2013, she was selling over 150 varieties of pickles and in 2016 she was reported to be selling 200 tonnes of food products. Her efforts have generated jobs in rural areas. She and her husband GS Yadav have opened a shop in Najafgarh. She reportedly have four different business ventures and her annual turnover was reported to be 40 million INR.

In 2016, Yadav was nominated to receive the Nari Shakti Puraskar on International Women's Day by the Ministry of Women and Child Development. The award was handed over by President Pranab Mukherjee at the Presidential palace in New Delhi. Another fourteen women and seven institutions were also honored for their achievements and contributions on the same day.
