= Chhawla =

Chhawla Village
- Suburban Village
- Location in India
- Coordinates: 28.5614°N 77.0020°E
- Country: India
- State: Delhi
- District: South West

Population (2011)
  - Total: 19,875
- Time zone: UTC+5:30 (IST)
- Postal code: 110071
- Vehicle registration: DL-09
- Languages: Hindi, English, Haryanvi

Chhawla village is a census town in the South West district in the state of Delhi, India.

== Demographics ==
According to the India census of 2001, Chhawla has a population of 9,047. Males constitute 57% of the population, females 40%, and 3% other. Chhawla has an average literacy rate of 77%, higher than the national average of 59.5%, with male literacy of 83% and female literacy of 68%. Thirteen percent of the population is under the age of six.
