= Holambi Kalan =

Suburban area in North West Delhi, India

- Tyagi Village
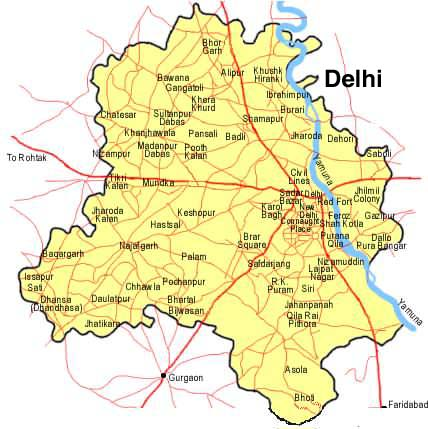
- Coordinates: 28.806°N 77.097°E
- Country: India
- Union Territory: Delhi
- District: North Delhi
- Tehsil: Narela
- Assembly constituency: Narela

Government
  - Type: Municipal Corporation
  - Body: Municipal Corporation of Delhi

Area
  - Total: 32.4 km^{2} (12.5 sq mi)

Dimensions
  - Length: 5.4 km (3.4 mi)
  - Width: 5.9 km (3.7 mi)
- Elevation: 210 m (690 ft)

Population
  - Estimate (2011): 42,392
  - Density: 5,865/km^{2} (15,190/sq mi)

Languages
  - Official: Hindi, English, Haryanvi

Time zone
- Indian Standard Time: UTC+05:30
- Postal code: 110082

Holambi Kalan is a village in the Narela Sub Division of the North Delhi district of Delhi, India. The area has a railway station named Holambi Kalan (HUK). Its distance from the Delhi Junction railway station is 21 km. It is 22 km away from New Delhi railway station. Metro Vihar is a rehabilitated colony in Holambi Kalan. The population of Metro Vihar is 42,392 according to the 2011 Census of India. It falls under the Narela assembly constituency.

== Demographics ==
Haryanvi, Hindi is the local language of Holambi Kalan but the English, Urdu, and Punjabi languages are also spoken.

Metro Vihar is a large rehabilitated colony which is a part of Holambi Kalan, Narela of North West Delhi district, Delhi with total 8157 families residing. The Holambi Kalan along with Metro Vihar has population of 42,392 of which 22,933 are males while 19,459 are females as per Population Census 2011.

There are 6091 0-6 year olds, making up 14.37% of total population of the area. The average sex ratio of Holambi Kalan is 849, which is lower than Delhi state average of 868. The child sex ratio for Holambi Kalan is 903, higher than the Delhi average of 871.

Holambi Kalan has a lower literacy rate compared to Delhi. In 2011, the literacy rate was 67.50% compared to 86.21% of Delhi. Male literacy stands at 76.09% while the female literacy rate was 57.27%.

== Geography ==
Holambi Kalan is a mostly plain area. The elevation of Holambi Kalan from sea level is 210m.
