= Najafgarh drain bird sanctuary =

Coordinates: 28.504°N 76.944°E

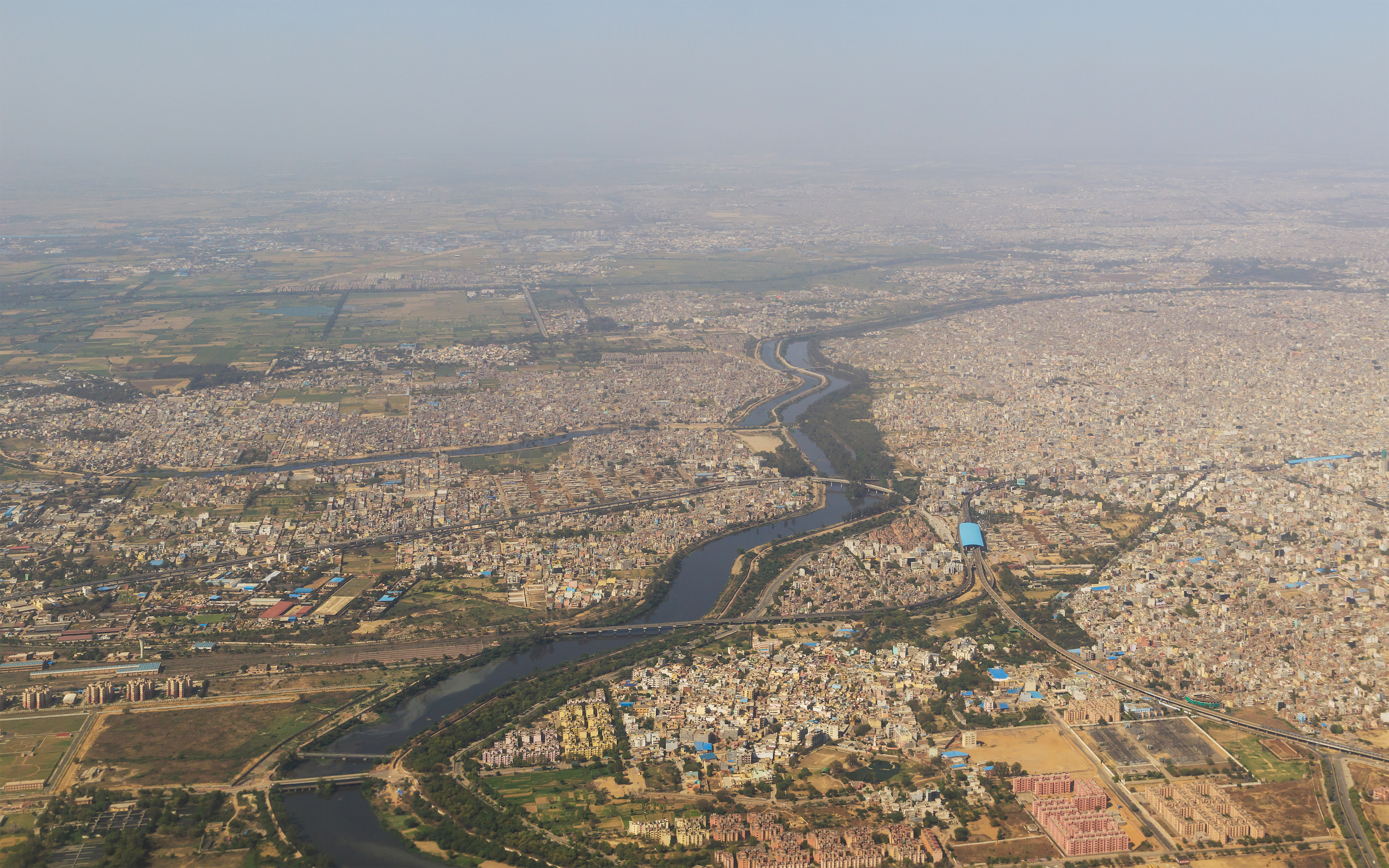
Aerial view of Najafgarh Drain

Najafgarh drain bird sanctuary and wetland ecosystem is composed of the wetland ecosystem and wildlife habitat on several kilometres of the Najafgarh drain (Delhi end of Sahibi River before it falls into Yamuna) which passes through southwest Delhi in India's capital territory. It includes the portion draining the depression or basin area that formed the once famous but now partially drained Najafgarh lake (Najafgarh jheel). It is a refuge to thousands of migratory waterbirds every winter. The winter months are the best time to visit it to see many flocks of wintering waterbirds. It is currently classified as a Protected Forest.

== History ==
The area came to be recognised as an important wildlife habitat after a local naturalist studying the area during 1986 to 1989 called attention to it, recommending it to be conserved as a bird sanctuary. After this, the Delhi wildlife department posted 16 guards in the area to control illegal bird hunters, including diplomats from various international embassies located in Delhi, India's capital. Delhi Administration officials were tasked with declaring about 25 km stretch of the drain in rural Delhi, including where it passes through the core area of the now partially drained Najafgarh Lake, protected under the Wildlife Act after Lt. Governor of Delhi Mr. H.L. Kapur was invited to the area for touring the site where he also heard accounts of local villagers telling of the rampant illegal hunting of waterbirds that went on here every year. The staff of the Flood Control and Irrigation Department, numbering about 40, were also given the additional responsibility of protecting the wildlife on and around the Drainage basin.

== Wetland ==
The Najafgarh drain itself acts as an elongated water body or lake. It has trees planted on both its embankments and an inspection road running on one embankment. During the winter months it attracts vast quantities of migratory birds, and supports local wildlife year-round. The wetland ecosystem and wildlife habitat on several kilometres of less polluted Najafgarh drain in rural Delhi before entering the main city, including the former Najafgarh lake or Najafgarh jheel area, is very important habitat to migratory waterbirds as well as local wildlife. It has been earmarked to be declared a bird sanctuary for Delhi. Sections of the forested embankments of Najafgarh drain are currently classified as the Protected Forests. Bird watchers also visit the area now and conduct annual bird-counts.

== Issues ==
Bird strikes on aircraft at the nearby Indira Gandhi International Airport have been a concern. The airport has undertaken several steps to mitigate the issue of bird strikes, including the positioning of 25 zone guns along the runway, deployment of 50 bird chasers, installation of reflective tapes, bursting of crackers, scarecrow devices on jeeps, regular grass cutting and pesticide spraying. Birds most commonly involved in bird strikes are the Pariah or Black Kite, Red-wattled Lapwing, Cattle Egret, pigeons and crows.

== See also ==
- Najafgarh drain, Delhi
- Nearby Najafgarh lake or Najafgarh jheel (now completely drained by Najafgarh drain)
- Najafgarh town, Delhi
- National Zoological Park Delhi
- Asola Bhatti Wildlife Sanctuary, Delhi
- Sultanpur National Park, bordering Delhi in adjoining Gurgaon District, Haryana
- Okhla Sanctuary, bordering Delhi in adjoining Uttar Pradesh
- Bhalswa horseshoe lake, Northwest, Delhi
