= Kakraula =

Coordinates: 24°24′N 85°18′E

Kakraula is a small village in Chauparan. It is part of the district of Hazaribag in Jharkhand.

== Population distribution ==
1. State - Jharkhand
2. District - Hazaribagh
3. Tahsil - Chauparan
4. Village - Kakraula
5. Male Population - 140
6. Female Population - 143
7. Kakraula Ward Member Name Shri Munshi Yadav
8. Total Population - 283
