= Narela =

Suburb of Delhi in North Delhi, India

- Neighborhood of Delhi
- Location in India
- Coordinates: 28.85°N 77.1°E
- Country: India
- State: Delhi
- District: North Delhi

Government
  - Body: North Delhi Municipal Corporation
- Elevation: 210 m (690 ft)

Population
  - Total: 809,913

Languages
  - Official: Hindi, English, Haryanvi
- Time zone: UTC+5:30 (IST)
- PIN: 110040
- Lok Sabha constituency: North West Delhi
- Vidhan Sabha constituency: Narela
- Civic agency: Municipal Corporation of Delhi

Narela is a Suburb and a Tehsil of Delhi, located in the North Delhi district of Delhi, close to the border of Haryana. Narela is a part of North Delhi. It is 30 km away from the city centre of New Delhi.

It is situated just off the Grand Trunk Road, its location made it an important commercial location for the surrounding areas, remains of the 19th century are still there. It was developed as the third mega sub city, which is a project of Delhi Development Authority (DDA) in the urban extension project of Delhi, other sub cities are Rohini sub city and Dwarka sub city. It covers an area of 9866 hectares. The 'Narela Industrial Area' started developing in the early 1980s and is today one of the important such complexes in Delhi.

It is one of 12 zones of the Municipal Corporation of Delhi (MCD) and one of the three subdistricts of the North Delhi district, along with Alipur and Model Town.

== History ==
=== Ancient era ===
Bhor Garh archeological site near Narela, which was excavated by Archaeological Survey of India (ASI) in 1992-93 and 1993–94, found artifacts belonging to the Late Harappan era of Indus Valley Civilization, Painted Grey Ware culture related to Vedic era, and Kushan Empire era (30 CE to 375 CE), and Bhorgarh inscription related to Tomar Dysnaty of Delhi (c. 8th-11th centure CE).

=== Medieval era: 9th century CE Narera under Tomar dynasty ===
During the Tomar Dynasty's rule, Narela was founded by a Hindu chief in 988 CE. According to the Bhorgarh inscription, the earlier human settlement at this site was known as the "Bhajju-Khera" after Bhardwaj Brahmins who had settled here. Narbir Singh (nicknamed "Nona"), son of Lahore's zamindar Akhand Pratap Singh, arrived here with his soldiers during a war exercise and chance encountered a girl named Nanki on the waterpond when he went for a bath. When "Nanu", the village chief, found Nona to be a brave warrior, the chief Nanu arranged Nona's and Nanki's wedding in 987-88 CE (944 Vikram Samvat दशोदस Kartika Krishna Paksha Navami Shukravar) and the area was named as the "Narera". When Delhi–Panipat–Ambala–Kalka line was opened in 1891, the John Christopher the superintendent of Northern Railway zone, who could not understand the Indian pronunciation of Narera, named the railway station "Narelah" and in due course of time the "h" disappeared from the name and it became "Narela".

Chahadapala, the ruler of Tomar Dynasty, built the water pond at Narela and connected it to Western Yamuna Canal where king and his queens use to come for bathing. During the digging of the pond at that time, a statue of Manasa (a Hindu goddess of snakes) was found and the king built an in-situ "Mata Mansa Devi Mandir Narela" temple of Mansa Devi at banks of the Pond which stills exists in Pana Paposia. The pond, which was built across 84 bigha with 10 gaz depth had ghat with 16 steps ghats and 24 chabutaras (platforms). The pond was later backfilled with the mud and dried up.

=== Medieval era: Delhi Sultanate ===
Even in the 13th century, during the days of Delhi Sultanate, Narela often became an encampment point, for marching or retreating armies from Delhi.

Sarai Narela was important sarai (caravan rest house) on the historic and busy Grand Trunk Road, that stretched all the way to Lahore and Kabul and the lifeline of the empire and important trade route.

=== Mughal era ===
Subsequently, during the Mughal era, The Narela Sarai also finds mention in Jahangirnama, the official autobiography of Mughal Emperor, Jahangir (1605–1627), as he mentions staying at the sarai, during his travels ca. 1605.

At the Tomar Raka Ka Talab (the "Pond of Tomar King"), which has dried up and has been acquired by the Delhi Development Authority (DDA), Mughal Empire coins of Babar, Akbar, Humanyu, and Mohammad Shah Rangila (r. 1719-1748) were found in 1998 when chidlre were playing cricket at the dried bed of the pond and their ball struck a pot which was filled with coins. Children took the coins away, but when ASI came to know of it they recovered 23 coins form the children.

=== 18th century: Maratha era ===
On 16 January 1757 in the Battle of Narela, before the Battle of Panipat (1761), the Maratha Army led by Antaji Mankeshwar, fought with an advance column of Ahmad Shah Abdali's Afghan army near Narela, and repulsed it. Mughals eventually lost the war to Afghans after muslim Nawab Najib ad-Dawlah of Saharanpur, a courtier of Mughal empire at Delhi, betrayed the native Maratha-Mughal forces and attacked Marathas from the rear at night.

=== 19th century: British raj ===
In the mid-19th century uner the Company raj, Narela was a tehsil and flourishing market town, and at 31.2 km was the nearest town to capital Delhi, and where people from neighbouring villages flocked to buy provisions and sell their agricultural produce and its Narela Mandi (agricultural market), a tradition which continues to date. By the early 20th century, it was a municipal town and a Civil Hospital was established by the District Board in 1913. After the World War I in 1919, Narela was declared a notified area by Delhi administration, earmarked for future development.

In 1860–61, the North-Western Provinces education system was abolished in Delhi, and Punjab education system was introduced with the opening of schools at Narela, Najafgarh, Mehrauli and their suburbs, several schools were opened here in the coming decades. The Hailey-Rifah-i-Am School was founded here in 1918, by Rifah-i-Am Society formed by local residents under the patronage of Lala Mussadi Lal, a noted social reformer. By 1920–1921, the society was running one middle school in Narela and two primary schools in Alipur and Kanjhawala and supported rural schools in Delhi Province.

Fro 1919 to 1941, British raj developed the Narela Anaz Mandi grain market here.

Dharani Road in Narela, was named in the aftermath of India's 1957 first war of independence. Ratna, a girl from Narela, who was married to Nahar Singh (6 April 1821 - 9 January 1858), the Jat king of princely state of Ballabgarh, who was hanged by British after the war for fighting against British colonial rule, returned to her parents in Narela and her parents give her the farm land where she built a house, temple and pond. The area later came to be known as Dhirani and then Dharani pond in her memory, where "dhi" means the "daughter" and "rani" means the "queen".

Mussadi Lal Senior Secondary School, the first school in Narela was established by the Lala Mussadi Lal who arrived here in 1914 and started the school from 2 rooms, which has now evolved into a large school.

Swami Omanand Saraswati (1911-2003), a local zamindar and numberdar of villages, founded Kanya Gurukul for girls in Narela by donating his 70 acres (280,000 m2) of land.

Lala Panna Lal Mangal (Kundli Wale), a prominent Indian Freedom Fighter and Congress party politician who worked with Mahatma Gandhi was also from Narela.

=== 1947 Partition of India ===
After the 1947 Partition of India and Independence of India, Hindu Punjabi refugees who arrived from Pakistan, were settled at Narela Anaz Mandi and they were later given plots of land to build permanent homes at newly established Punjabi Colony.

== Geography ==
The time zone in Narela (latitude. 28.85° and longitude. 77.1°) is India/Calcutta, with sunrise at 07:12 and Sunset at 17:30.

=== Residential colonies ===
Historically, Narela village had has three main Pana (parts): Pana Udyan, Pana Paposiyan, Pana Mamurpur. Presently, Narela is divided into various residential colonies, namely Rajeev colony, Nai Basti, Punjabi colony, Gautam colony, Swatantra Nagar, Shivaji Colony, Master colony, Sanjay colony, Indra colony, Police colony, etc.

Narela Urban extension project, was developed from 2010 onwards. The project area is bounded by the Delhi-Haryana border in the North, Western Yamuna Canal in the West, GT Karnal road in the East and Badli-Auchandi Marg in the South East. Project includes 8000 residential flats of different categories on 1000 ha land including 1000 flats allotted for Delhi Police, 200 bedded Raja Harish Chander Government Hospital in Sector A7, and a Recreational club in sector A7, DTC terminal, Fire station, Narela Industrial Estate from G.T. Karnal road (NH44) to Bawana Industrial area, National Science Park, Integrated Freight Complex.

=== Nearby towns ===
Its nearby towns are Alipur (9.9 km), Mukmelpur (10 km), Bawana (11.5 km) and Rāi (14.8 km). Located on the famed Grand Trunk Road, Narela is situated 14 km (8.7 miles) south of Sonipat, 42 km (26.3 miles) northwest of central Delhi, 100 km (62.2 miles) south of Karnal and 225 km (140 miles) southwest of Chandigarh. The Singhu Border is just 4 km (2.5 miles) away from Narela.

== Administration ==
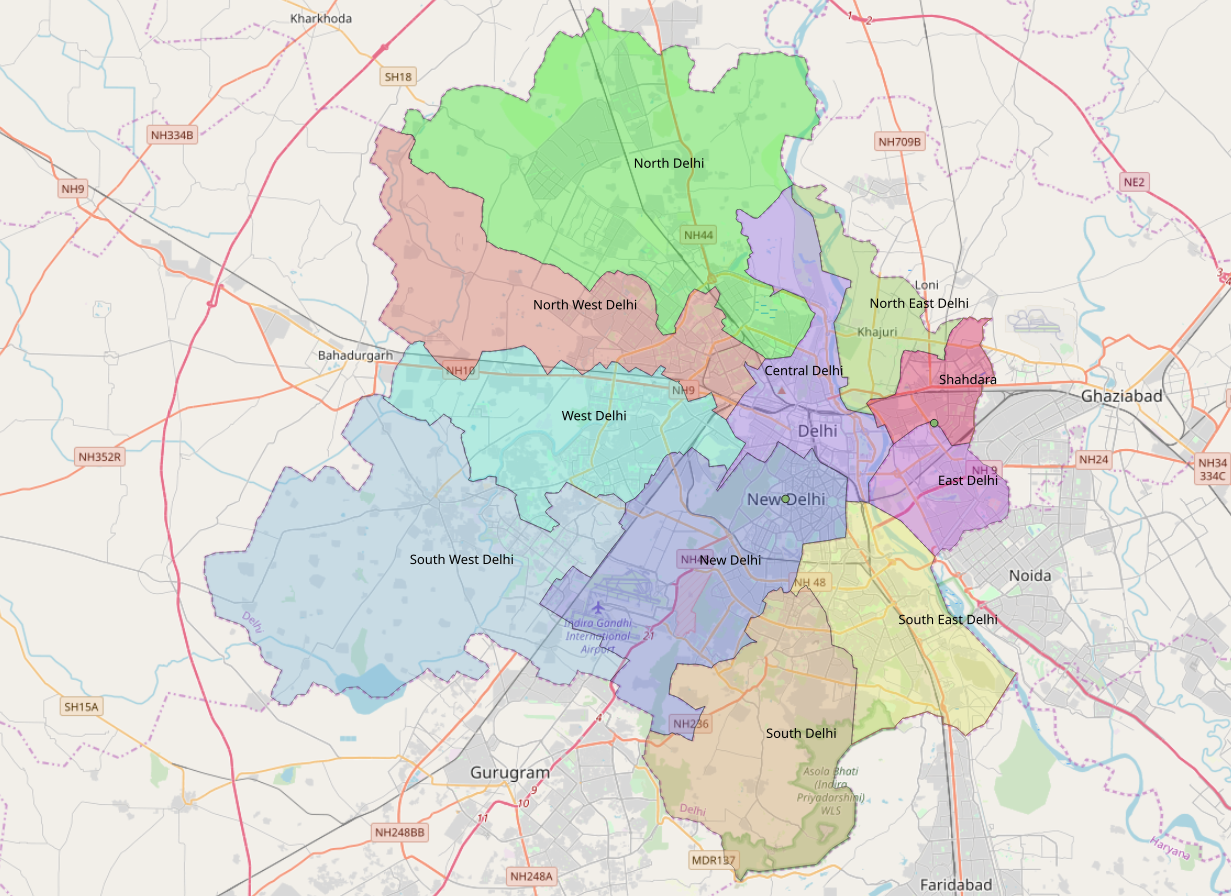
Old districts of Delhi until 2025 when Narela use to be the North West Delhi district. After the expansion of districts to 13, Narela is presently a sub-division in Outer North Delhi district.

=== Legislative assembly constituency ===
From 1993 to 2008, Narela was Delhi Legislative Assembly segment within the East Delhi Lok Sabha constituency, prior to it from 1966 to 1993 Narela, Narela remained a Delhi Metropolitan Council segment, within the same Lok Sabha constituency. After the delimitation of 2008, Narela (Nerela) is now an Assembly segment within the North West Delhi Lok Sabha constituency. After the 2025 Delhi Legislative Assembly election, Rajkaran Khatri of Bharatiya Janata Party became the incumbent MLA from Narela constituency of Delhi Assembly.

During 2020, Jayender Kumar Dabas was the chairman of Narela Zone of North Delhi Municipal Corporation.

=== Narela Sub-division ===
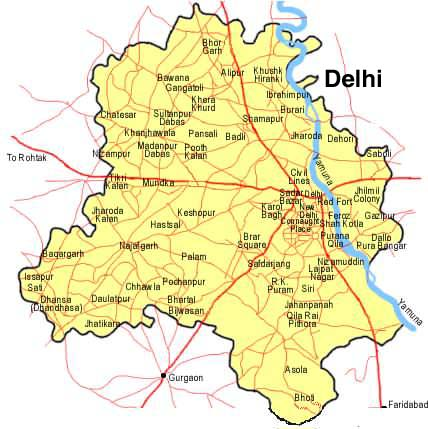
Map of Delhi showing locations within Narela Sub-division (Bhor Garh and Alipur) in the north.

The office of Sub Divisional Magistrate (SDM) (Narela), the head of Narela subdivision of North West Delhi district, is situated Block Development Officer (BDO) Office complex, at nearby Alipur, which is within the subdivision, along with Sub Registrar Office.

Revenue villages in Narela Sub-division are, Bakhtawar Pur, Akbarpur Majra, Alipur, Bakholi, Bankner, Bhor Garh, Lampur, Budhpur, Fatehpur Jat, Garhi Khasro, Gogha, Hamid Pur, Hiranki, Holambi Kalan, Holambi Khurd, Singhola, Iradat Nagar (Naya Bans), Tajpur, Tikri Khurd, Sanoth, Jhangola, Sungerpur, Jind Pur, Khampur, Khera Kalan, Kureni, and Singhu (border between Delhi and Haryana states).

== Demographics ==
As of 2011 Indian Census, the Narela sub-district had a total population of 809,913, of which 439,576 were males and 370,337 were females. The population within the age group of 0 to 6 years was 109,475. The total number of literates in Narela was 569,830, which constituted 70.3% of the population with male literacy of 75.9% and female literacy of 63.8%. The effective literacy rate of 7+ population of Narela was 81.4%, of which male literacy rate was 87.7% and the female literacy rate was 73.8%. The Scheduled Castes population was 155,299. Narela had 160132 households in 2011.

== Legacy Businesses ==
During the late 20th century, Narela's commercial landscape included several family-run enterprises that strengthened the local agro‑processing sector. One such business was Hanuman Oil and Flour Mill, located in the Narela Mandi area. According to trade records, the mill was established in the early 1970s by Ram Bhagat Mangla, Jagannath Mangla, Jagdish Mangla, and Trilok Chand Mangla. The enterprise processed staples such as toor dal, mustard oil, and flour, and operated for several decades. Beyond production, it played a role in boosting agro‑processing capacity in the region and supporting fellow traders. Locally, the family became associated with the "Kundi wale" lineage, which earned recognition within the Narela trading community. The mill was also officially empanelled with the Food Corporation of India (FCI) for wheat distribution under the Open Market Sale Scheme (OMSS) as of 2014.

== Transport ==
=== Air ===
Airports with regular scheduled commercial flights are:

- Indira Gandhi International Airport 40 km south of Narela
- Noida International Airport 110 km southeast of Narela
- Hindon Airport 40 km southeast of Narela with domestic flights only
- Hisar Airport 160 km west of Narela with domestic flights only and internation flights being planned

=== Railway ===
Narela (NUR) is a station of Indian Railways.

Samaypur Badli metro station station on Delhi Metro's Yellow Line is the nearest station. Delhi Metro's Master Plan Phase IV, currently underway, entails extension of metro to Narela and beyond to Sonipat.

=== Road ===
Narela is located on G.T. Karnal road (NH44). The Delhi Transport Corporation (DTC) has a bus depot at Narela with bus services within Delhi and nearby towns in NCR.

== See also ==
- List of neighbourhoods of Delhi
