= Zind Pur =

Coordinates: 28.7904692°N 77.1414418°E

Zind Pur, Delhi
- Village
- Interactive map of Zind Pur, Delhi
- Country: India
- State: Delhi
- District: North West Delhi

Area
  - Total: 273 ha (670 acres)

Population
  - Total: 11,359(2,020)

Zind Pur is a village which falls in North West Delhi district situated in NCT of Delhi state. Its nearest railway station is Khera Kalan which is 3.39 km away.

== Demographics ==
The total geographical area of village is 273 hectares. Zind Pur has a total population of 11359 peoples(2020).The male and female populations are 6164 and 5195 respectively.
