= Holambi Khurd =

Locality in North Delhi District, Delhi, India

Coordinates: 28°48′N 77°06′E

Holambi Khurd is a village in the Narela Sub Division of the North Delhi district of Delhi, India. The area has a railway station, Holambi Kalan (HUK). Its distance from Old Delhi Junction railway station is 21 km and it is 22 km away from New Delhi railway station. As of the 2011 Census of India, its population was 7,630. It falls under the Narela assembly constituency.

== Education ==
The Mann School is located in Holambi Khurd, on National Highway 1 (NH 1). Its inception was in 1989. The Mann School is a member of Indian Public Schools' Conference (IPSC) and an ISO-9001:2000 and ISO 14001:2004 certified school, and a British Council International school awardee.
