= Siraspur =

- city
- Siraspur in Delhi
- Coordinates: 28.76316°N 77.13312°E
- Country: India
- State: Delhi
- District: North West
- Founder: Diksha

Population (2001)
  - Total: 14,558

Languages
  - Official: Hindi, English
- Time zone: UTC+5:30 (IST)

Siraspur village is a census town in North West district in the Indian state of Delhi.

== Demographics ==
Historical population
Year	Pop.	±%
2001	15,043	—
2011	30,445	+102.4%
Source: Government of India

At the 2001 India census, Siraspur had a population of 14,558. Males constituted 56% of the population and females 44%. It had an average literacy rate of 65%, higher than the national average of 59.5%, with male literacy at 73% and female literacy at 55%. 17% of the population was under 6 years of age.
