= Najafgarh =

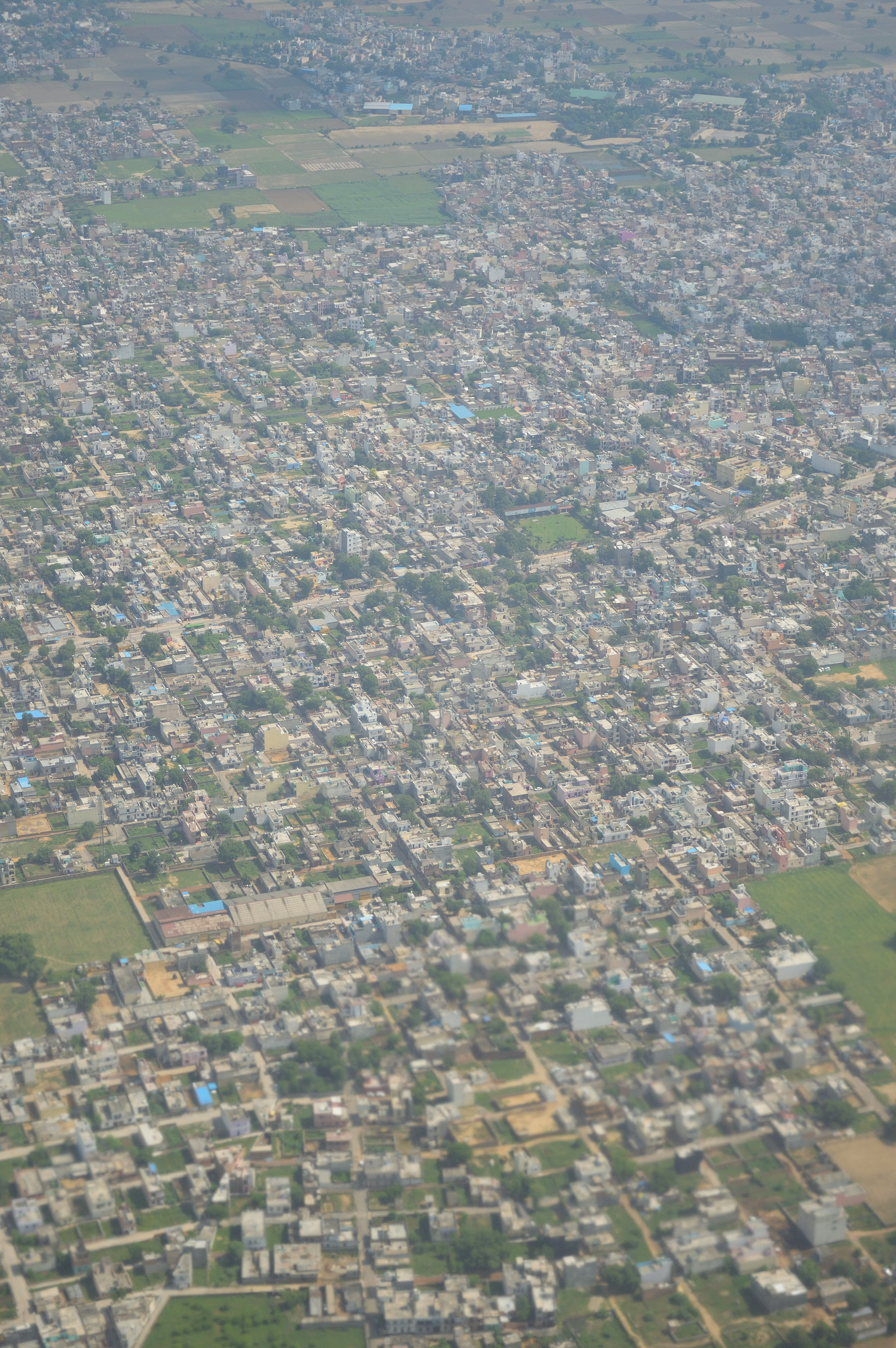
- Aerial view of western Najafgarh in 2016

- Location in India
- Coordinates: 28°36′45″N 76°59′5″E
- Country: India
- State: Delhi
- District: South West Delhi

Government
  - Body: Municipal Corporation of Delhi

Population (2011)
  - Total: 1,365,152

Languages
  - Official: Hindi; English
  - Additional official: Punjabi; Urdu
- Time zone: UTC+5:30 (IST)
- Postal code: 110043
- Lok Sabha constituency: West Delhi
- Vidhan Sabha constituency: Najafgarh
- Civic agency: MCD

Najafgarh is a town in the South West Delhi district of Delhi, India. It is one of the three subdivisions of the South West Delhi district. Najafgarh is located on the outskirts of NCT Delhi in south western part of Delhi sharing its territory limits with Gurgaon and Bahadurgarh, in Haryana.

== History ==
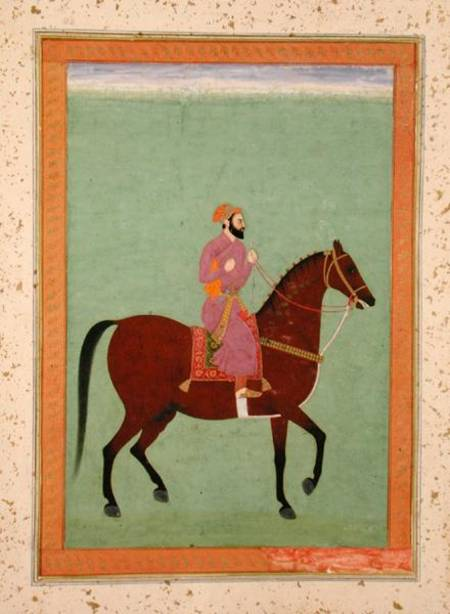
Mirza Najaf Khan, after whom Najafgarh is named

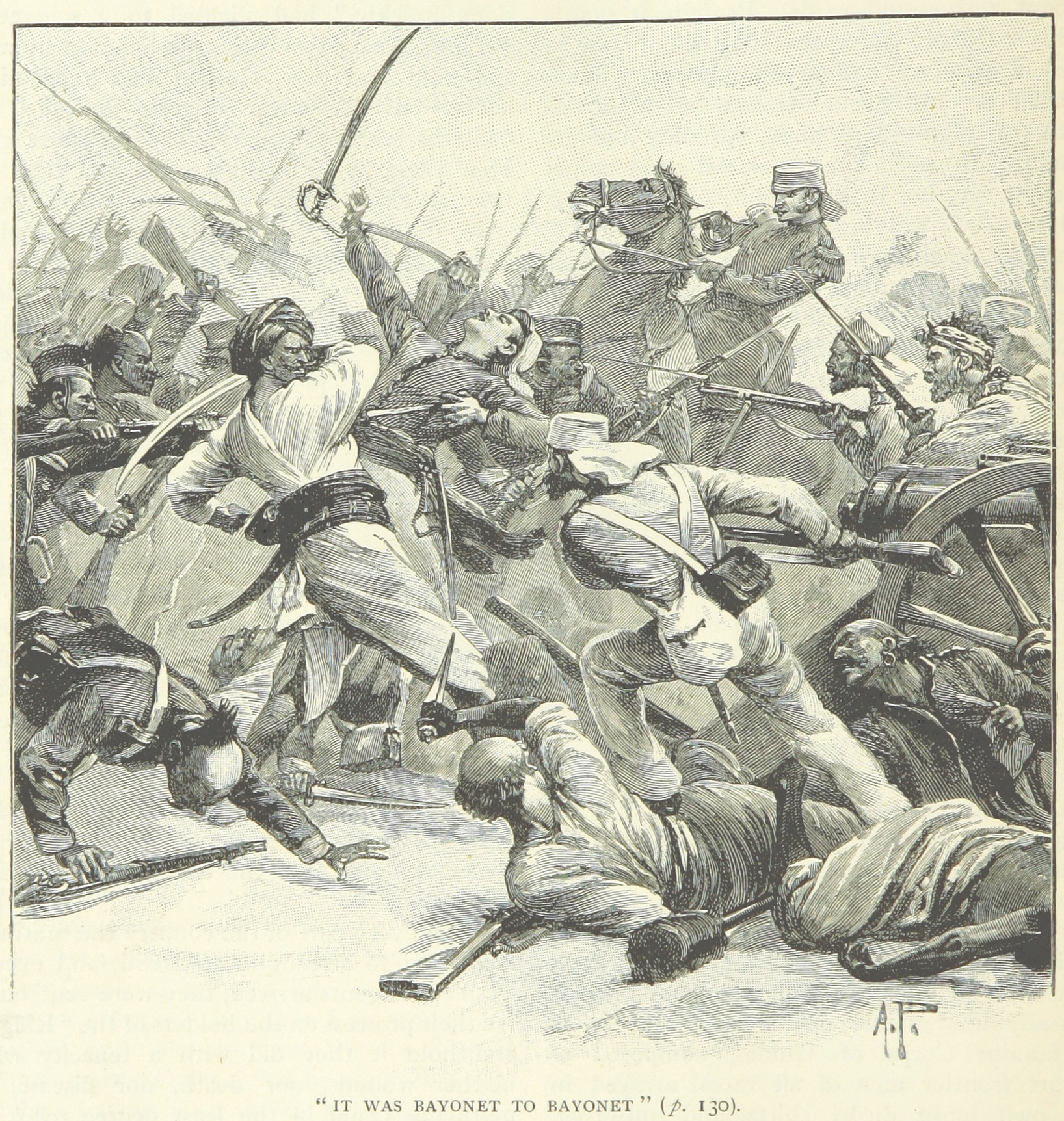
The Battle of Najafgarh

Before the foundation of modern Najafgarh, the site was occupied by the town of Mas'ūdābād. Mas'ūdābād was listed in the Ain-i-Akbari as a pargana in sarkar Delhi. It was assessed at 2,809,156 dams in revenue and supplied a force of 30 cavalry and 30 infantry. It was described as having an old brick fort and a prominent Jat population.

Najafgarh was named after Mirza Najaf Khan (1723–1782) the commander-in-chief of the Mughal Army under the Emperor Shah Alam II. He marched several kilometres from the capital of Shahjahanabad to establish a military outpost, which would guard Delhi against attacks by British, Rohillas and Sikhs. He built a strong fort, in the suburbs beyond the capital city, and settled a small number of the Mughal here. That fort was later named Najafgarh. After the death of Najaf Khan, Najafgarh later became a fortified stronghold of the Rohilla Afghan chieftain Zabita Khan.

During the Indian Rebellion of 1857, and as a part of the Siege of Delhi, the Battle of Najafgarh took place on 25 August 1857 between Indian rebels and East India Company soldiers. Approximately 800 people were killed. After the defeat of the Mughal troops in 1857, Delhi came under the control of the British Empire in 1858. Najafgarh became a part of Delhi district of the Delhi Division of Punjab Province. Delhi was transferred from the North-Western Provinces (later the United Provinces) to Punjab by the British Government in 1859.

In 1861, the North-Western Provinces education system was abolished in Delhi, and a new system for schools modelled on the Punjab education system was introduced by W.M. Holroyd, the Inspector of Schools for the Ambala Division. New schools were opened at Narela, Najafgarh, Mehrauli and their suburbs. Several schools were opened in the following decades. The Delhi Normal School was shifted to Najafgarh from Kashmere Gate in 1911. The Delhi Normal School, with a small attached Model School, trained its teachers in closer accordance with European methods than any other Normal School in Northern India.

In 1947, Najafgarh became a part of independent India and fell under the union territory of Delhi. Najafgarh Assembly Constituency was established in 1993 when the Delhi legislative assembly was re-established after the Constitution (Sixty-ninth Amendment Act, 1991) came into force. This declared the Union Territory of Delhi to be formally known as National Capital Territory of Delhi. Najafgarh is now one of the most populous electoral regions in the National Capital Region of India (NCR). Najafgarh is surrounded by 70 villages bordering Haryana. The borders are 10 kilometres (6.2 mi) to 15 kilometres (9.3 mi) from the main Najafgarh Market.

== Geography ==
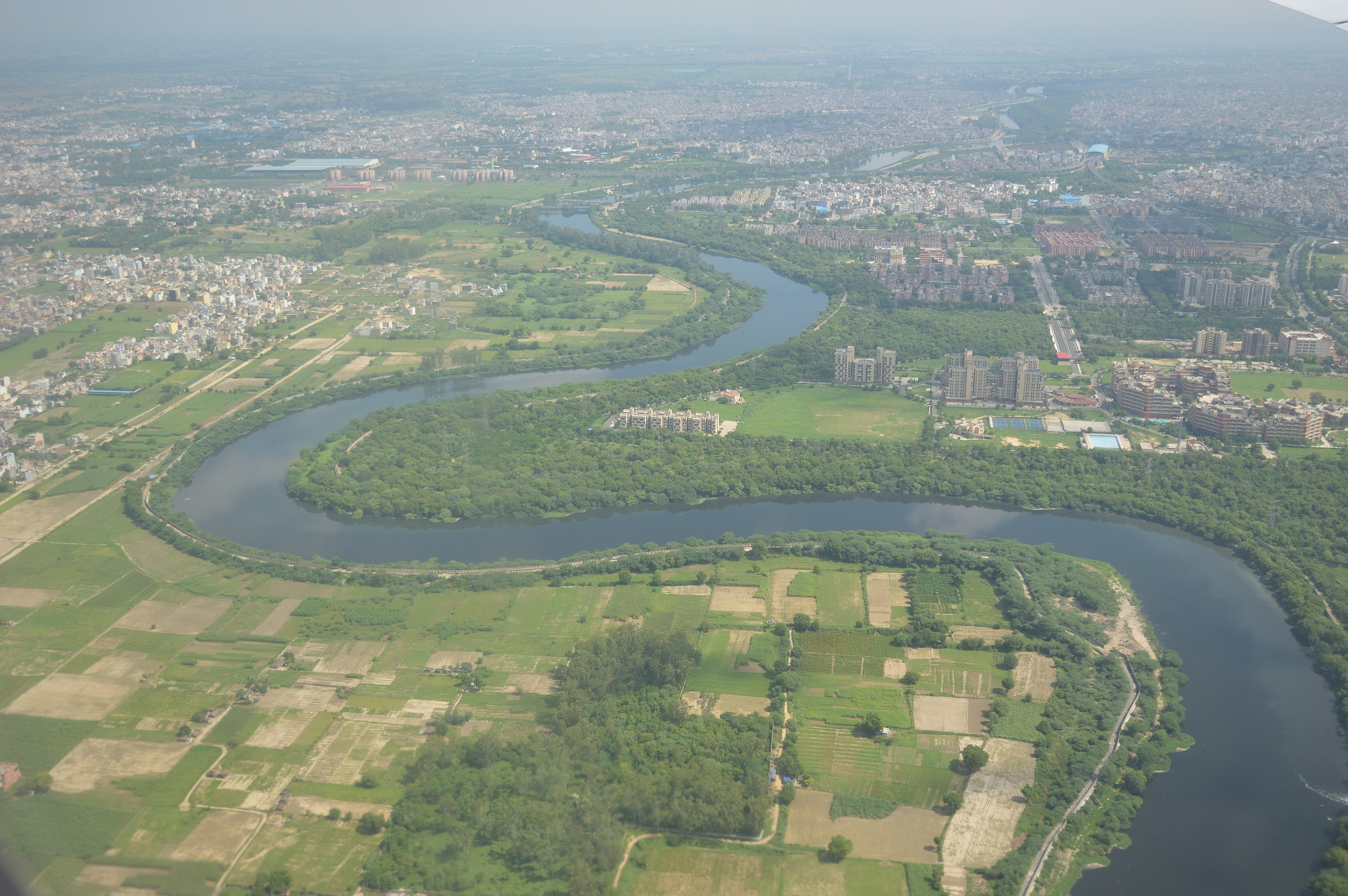
Aerial View of Najafgarh Drain

Najafgarh is located at 28.60°N 76.98°E in the South West Delhi district in the NCT of Delhi. Najafgarh is situated 29 kilometres (18 mi) Southwest of the New Delhi City Centre and 10 kilometres (6.2 mi) northwest to the district headquarters at Dwarka. It has an average elevation of 218 m (715 ft) above mean Sea Level. Najafgarh Drain, the continuation of the Sahibi River and an elongation of the Najafgarh Lake is the Indian capital's most polluted body of water due to the direct inflow of untreated sewage from surrounding populated areas. A January 2005 report by the Central Pollution Control Board classifies this drain, with 13 other highly polluted wetlands, under category "D" for assessing the water quality of wetlands in wildlife habitats.

== Demographics ==
As of 2011 India census, the population of Najafgarh is 1,365,152. Female sex Ratio is of 872 against Delhi's average of 868. Moreover, the child sex ratio in Najafgarh is around 832 compared to Delhi's average of 871. The literacy rate is 88.1%. Schedule Caste (SC) constitutes 12.60% of total population in Najafgarh.

== Government and politics ==
=== Delhi Legislative Assembly ===
The Najafgarh constituency of the Delhi Legislative Assembly was created in 2008 based on the recommendations of the Delimitation Commission of India constituted in 2002.

Neelam Pahalwan of the Bharatiya Janata Party has been its representative since 2025, defeating Tarun Yadav of the Aam Aadmi Party. The Najafgarh assembly constituency is part of the West Delhi (Lok Sabha constituency).

== Transport ==
Indira Gandhi International Airport is the nearest international airport to Najafgarh.

The Najafgarh is well connected to Delhi Metro, its metro station is located on the Grey Line of the Delhi Metro. It was opened for public on 4 October 2019.

As part of Phase III of Delhi Metro, Najafgarh is metro station of the Grey Line. Station was opened for public on 4 October 2019.[1] Najafgarh metro station is 288 meters long and is situated at a depth of 21 meters from the road level. The station is unique as it is only metro depot station to operate both Broad gauge and Standard gauge trains.

Delhi Urban Extension Road-II (UER-II) passes through Najafgarh near the Sai Baba temple. UER-II diverts commercial and private vehicles that previously used Najafgarh as a bypass between NH-8 and NH-10, reducing local traffic congestion.

Najafgarh is connected by roads with major destinations all over Delhi and Haryana. The DTC (Delhi Transport Corporation) and DIMTS (Delhi Multi-Model Transit System) provide bus services from Najafgarh Bus Terminal to the other parts of Delhi. In October 2019, a new metro line called the Grey Line was linked from Dwarka to Najafgarh, taking the rapid transit system to the area for the first time. The line was further extended to Dhansa Bus Stand in September 2021, thereby linking the interior rural areas of Najafgarh.

== Landmarks ==
- Najafgarh drain, Delhi
- Najafgarh drain bird sanctuary, Delhi
- Najafgarh Lake

== Notable people ==
- Brahm Prakash: first chief minister of Delhi.
- Virender Sehwag: Cricketer, born in Najafgarh
- Sushil Kumar: Wrestler, born in Baprola Village, Najafgarh
- Krishna Yadav won the Nari Shakti Puraskar for her business in Najafgarh.
