= Mukhmel Pur =

- census town
- Location within Delhi
- Coordinates: 28.789°N 77.161°E
- Country: India
- Union Territory: Delhi
- District: North West

Population (2011)
  - Total: 4,931

Languages
  - Official: Hindi
- Time zone: UTC+5:30 (IST)

Mukhmel Pur is a census town in North West district in the Indian territory of Delhi. According to the 2011 census, there were 910 families residing in the Mukhmel Pur city. The total population was 4,931 (2,649 males and 2,282 females; sex ratio 861).

There were 584 children aged 0–6 years (331 males and 253 females), 12% of the total population. The child sex ratio was 764, lower than the overall ratio (861).

The literacy rate was 84.8%, higher than the 84.4% average of North West district. Male literacy was 91.76% and female literacy was 76.74%.
