= Bakhtawar Pur =

Census town in North Delhi

- Clustered settlement
- Location in India
- Coordinates: 28.821°N 77.166°E
- Country: India
- Union Territory: Delhi
- District: North Delhi
- Established: 1911
- Founder: Chauhan's

Government
  - Type: Delhi Legislative Assembly
  - Body: Nerela Assembly constituency

Area
  - Total: 2 km^{2} (0.77 sq mi)
  - Rank: 1

Population (2011)
  - Total: 12,716
  - Density: 6,400/km^{2} (16,000/sq mi)

Languages
  - Official: Hindi
- Time zone: UTC+5:30 (IST)

Bakhtawar Pur is a census town covered under North West Delhi Lok Sabha constituency. It is located in North Delhi, Delhi.
