= National Zoological Park Delhi =

National Zoo at Delhi

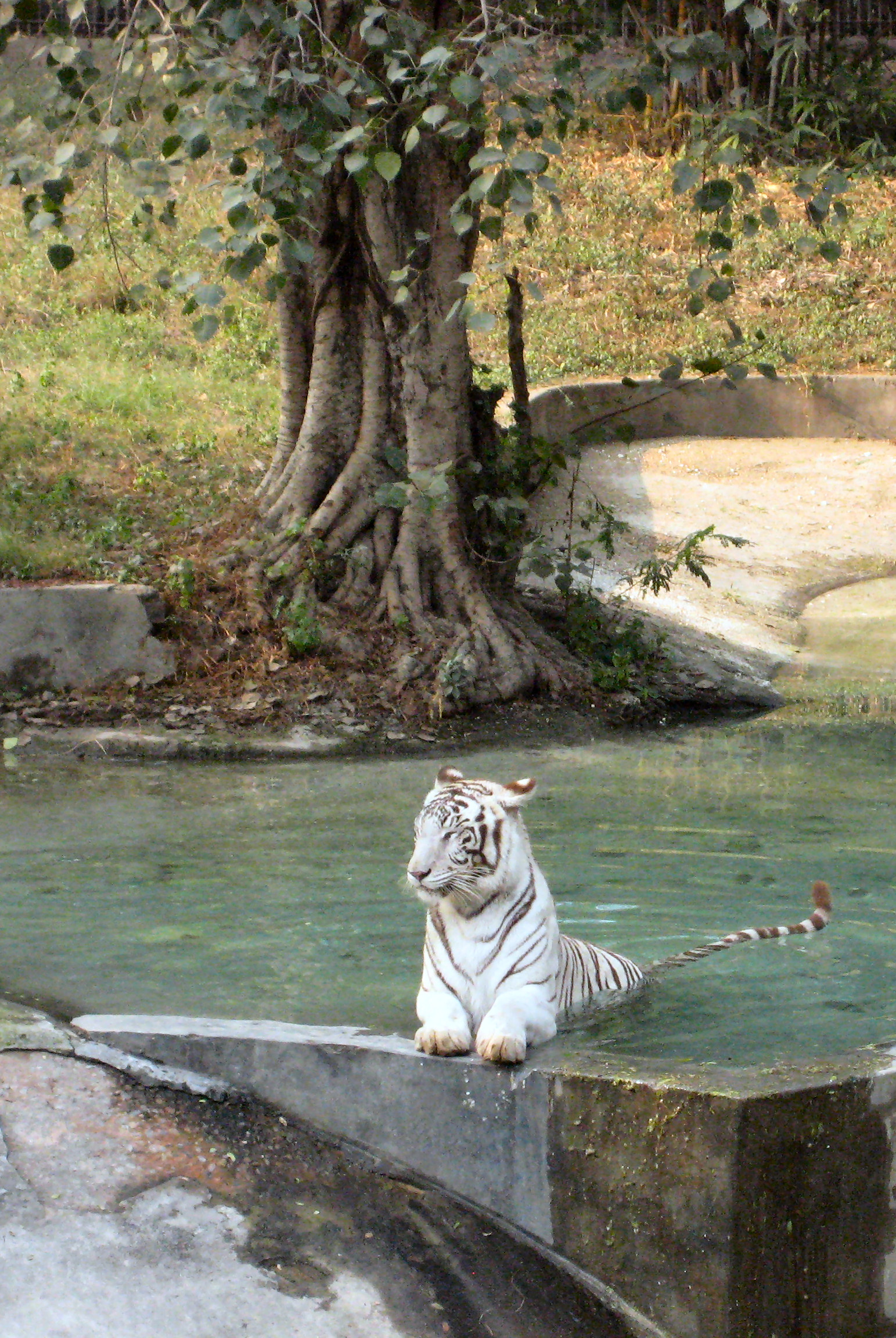
- White Tiger at National Zoological Park, Delhi
- Interactive map of National Zoological Park Delhi
- 28.6044359°N 77.2461981°E
- Date opened: 1 November 1959; 66 years ago
- Location: Delhi, India
- Land area: 176 acres (71 ha)
- No. of animals: 1347 (2008)
- No. of species: 127 (2008)
- Memberships: CZA
- Website: www.nzpnewdelhi.gov.in

The National Zoological Park (originally Delhi Zoo) is a 176-acre (71 ha) zoo in Delhi, India.

== History ==
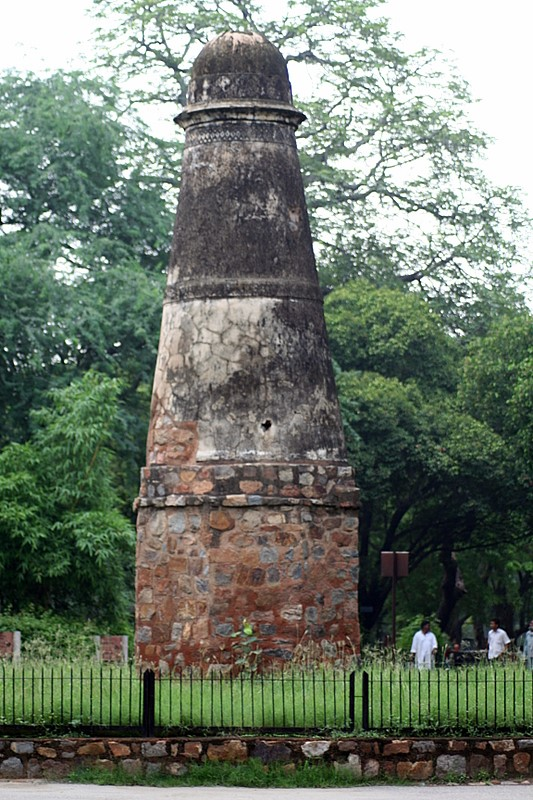
Mughal period Kos Minar in the zoo

The Delhi zoo was established decades after New Delhi was built. Although the idea to have a zoo near the national capital was proposed in 1951, the park was inaugurated in November 1959.

In 1952, the Indian Board for Wildlife created a committee to look into creating a zoo for Delhi. The government of India was to develop the zoo and then turn it over to Delhi as a working enterprise. In 1953 the committee approved the location of the zoo, and in October 1955 it assigned N. D. Bachkheti of the Indian Forest Service to oversee the creation of the zoo.

Initially Major Aubrey Weinman of the Ceylon Zoological Garden (now the National Zoological Gardens of Sri Lanka) was asked to help draw the plans for the zoo, but because he was not available for the long term, Carl Hagenbeck of the Zoological Garden of Hamburg was hired. In March 1956, Hagenbeck presented a preliminary plan, which included the recommendation to use moated enclosures for the new zoo. The plan was modified as needed to account for local conditions, and approved by the Indian government in December 1956.

By the end of 1959, the Northern part of the zoo was complete, and animals which had been arriving for some time and which had been housed in temporary pens were moved into their permanent homes. The park was opened on 1 November 1959 as the Delhi Zoo. In 1982 it was officially renamed to National Zoological Park, with hopes that it could become a model for other zoos in the country.

=== Maqsood incident ===
On 23 September 2014, a man named Maqsood, fell in white tiger's moat accidentally. The children around started throwing stones at the tiger. The man was then carried away and mauled by the enraged tiger after some minutes. The man later succumbed to his injuries. The incident, which took place between 12.30 pm and 1 pm, created a sensation and word soon spread through the metropolis, with pictures and video of the tiger - one of the zoo's star attractions - dragging the man going viral.

== Exhibits ==
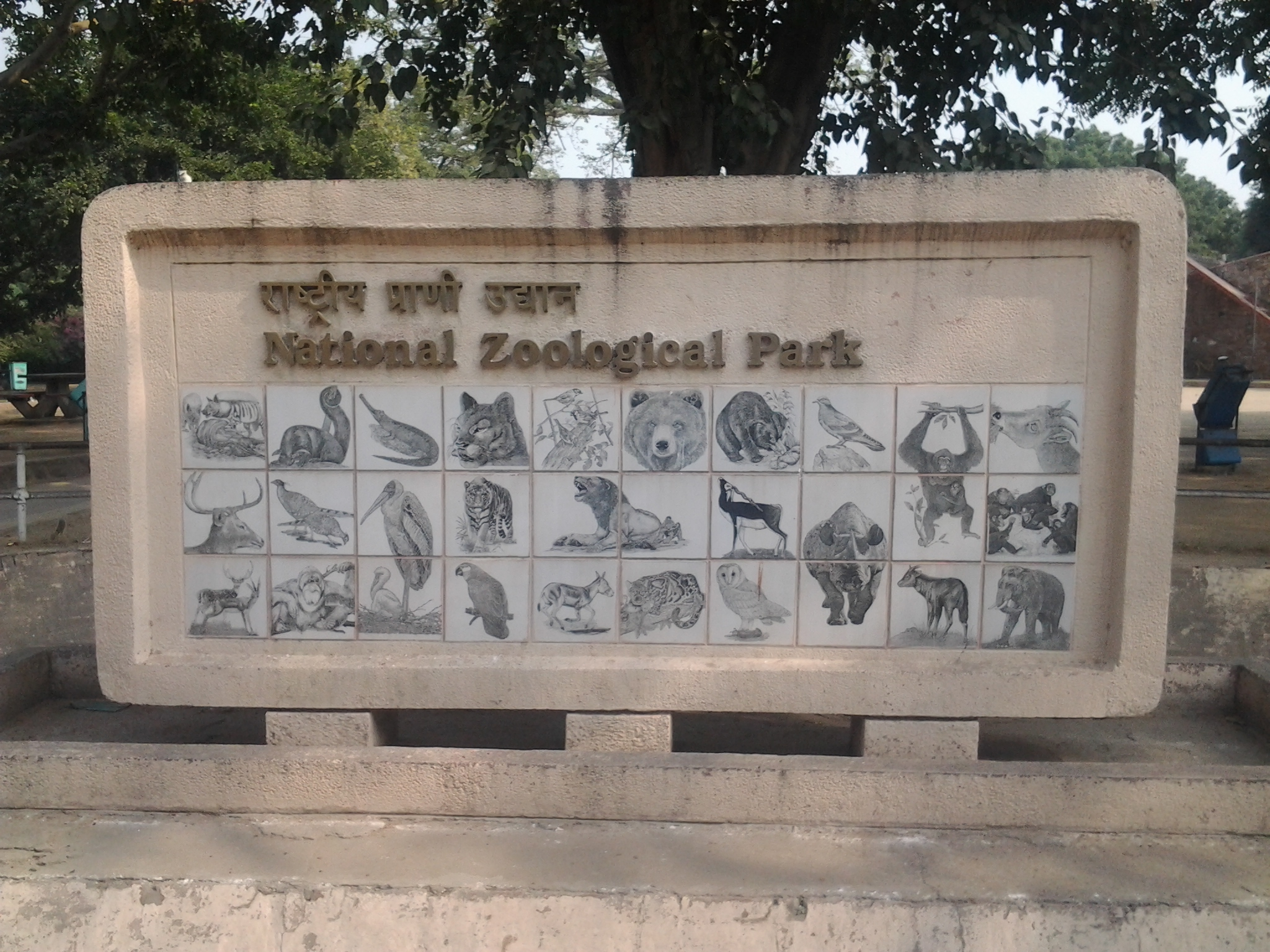
Zoo entrance depicts the exhibits.

The zoo is home to about 1350 animals representing almost 130 species of animals and birds from around the world.

=== Mammals ===
- Asian palm civet
- Asiatic lion
- Barasingha
- Bengal fox
- Bengal tiger
- Blackbuck
- Four-horned antelope
- Gaur
- Golden jackal
- Hanuman langur
- Himalayan black bear
- Hog deer
- Indian crested porcupine
- Indian elephant
- Indian leopard
- Greater one-horned rhinoceros
- Indian wolf
- Lion-tailed macaque
- Nilgai
- Rhesus macaque
- Sambar deer
- Sangai
- Sloth bear

=== Birds ===
- African grey parrot
- Alexandrine parakeet
- Black swan
- Blue-and-yellow macaw
- Brahminy kite
- Budgerigar
- Cockatiel
- Common ostrich
- Edwards's pheasant
- Egyptian vulture
- Emu
- Eurasian spoonbill
- Golden pheasant
- Great hornbill
- Great horned owl
- Greater rhea
- Grey francolin
- Indian grey hornbill
- Indian peafowl
- Illiger's macaw
- Kalij pheasant
- Lady Amherst's pheasant
- Little corella
- Painted stork
- Red junglefowl
- Red-and-green macaw
- Rosy pelican
- Silver pheasant
- Sun parakeet
- Zebra finch

=== Reptiles ===
- Gharial
- Indian cobra
- Indian python
- Indian star tortoise
- Mugger crocodile
- Red-eared slider

== Conservation breeding ==
The zoo is part of conservation breeding programmes of the Central Zoo Authority for the royal Bengal tiger, Indian rhinoceros, swamp deer, Asiatic lion, brow antlered deer, and red junglefowl.

The breeding program for the brow-antlered deer has been successful, starting with a pair of these deer in 1962, that individuals from the herd have been distributed to zoos in Ahmedabad, Kanpur, Lucknow, Hyderabad, Junagarh, and Mysore, and have acclimated well to all of these locations.

== Gallery ==
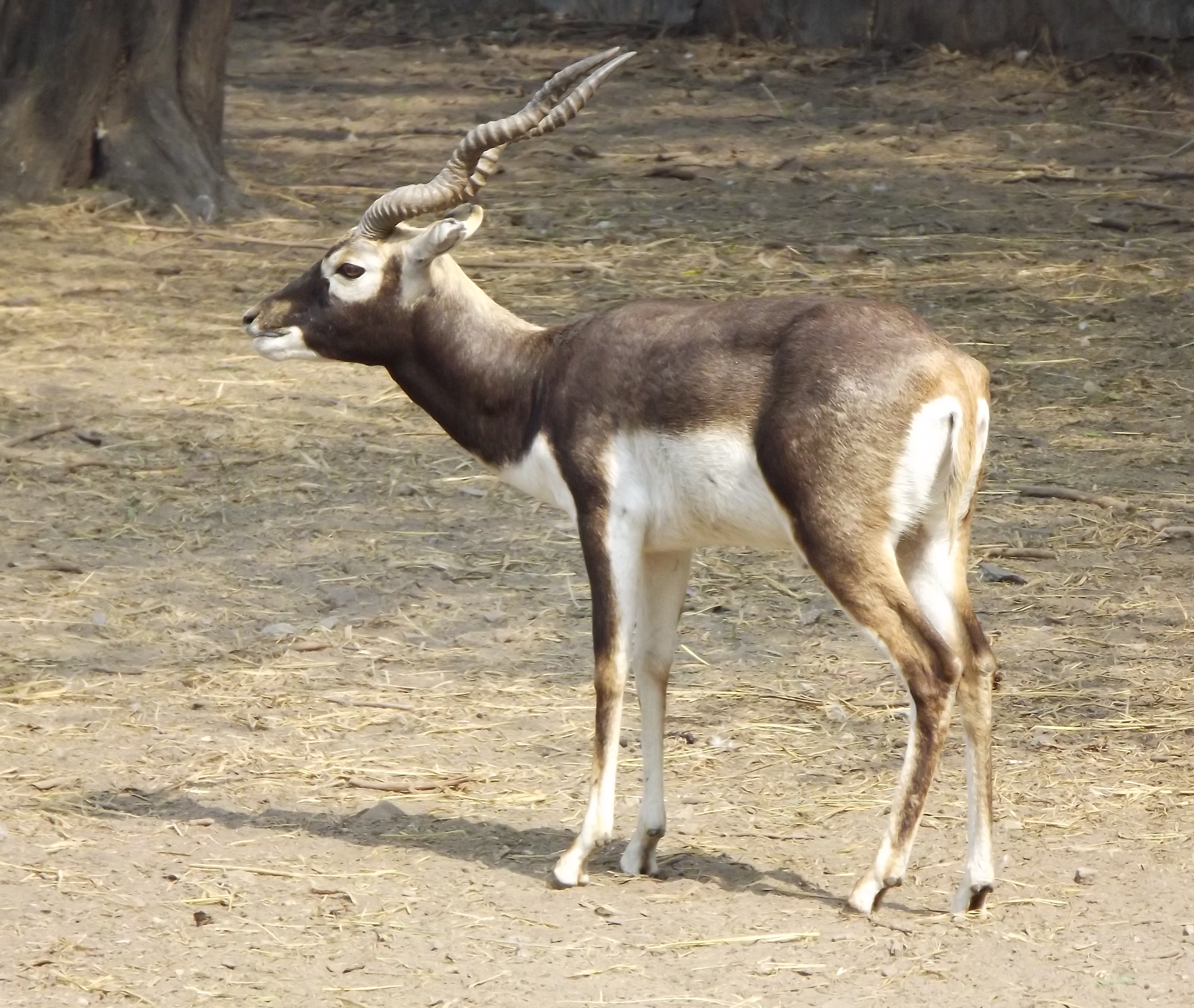
Blackbuck

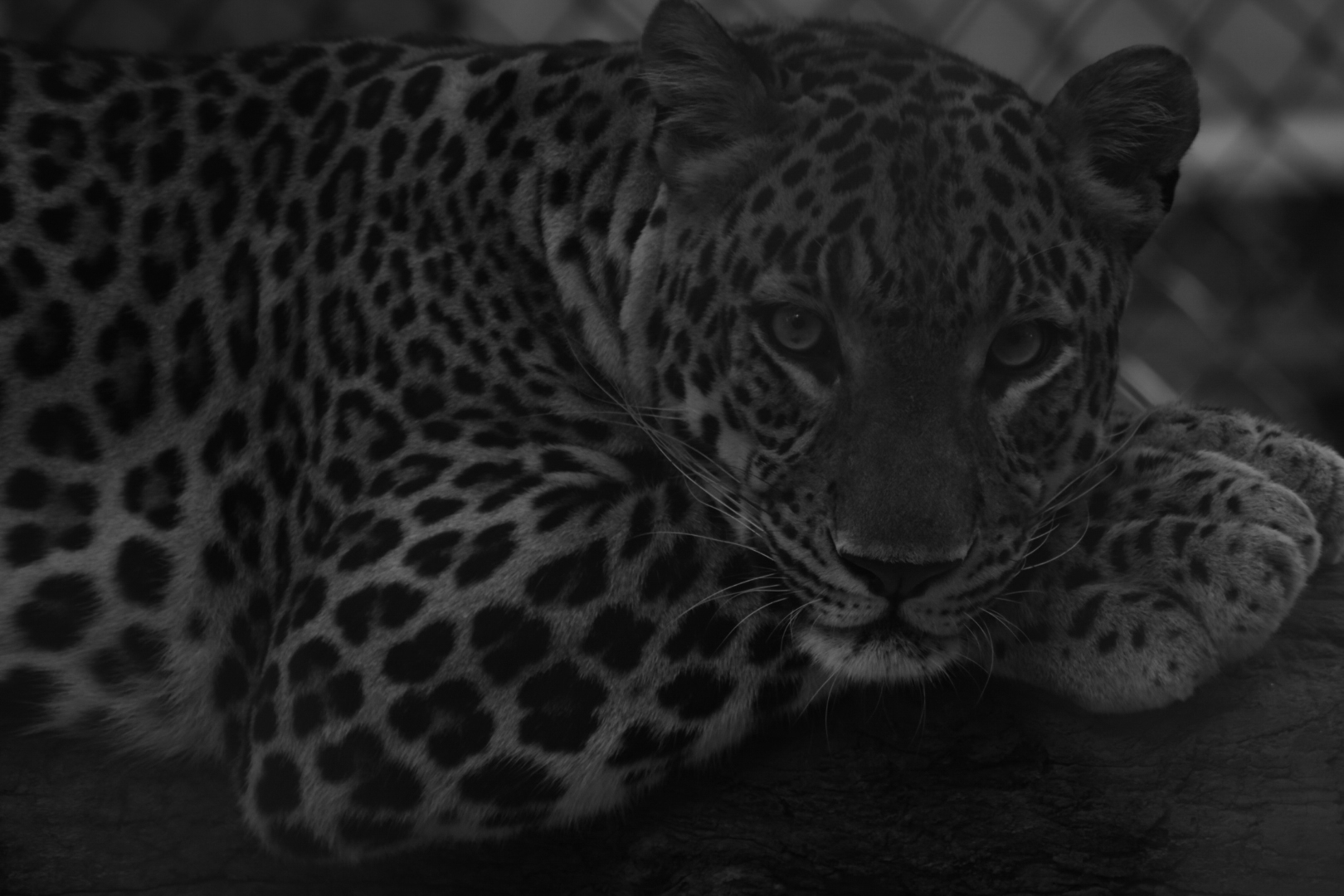
Leopard

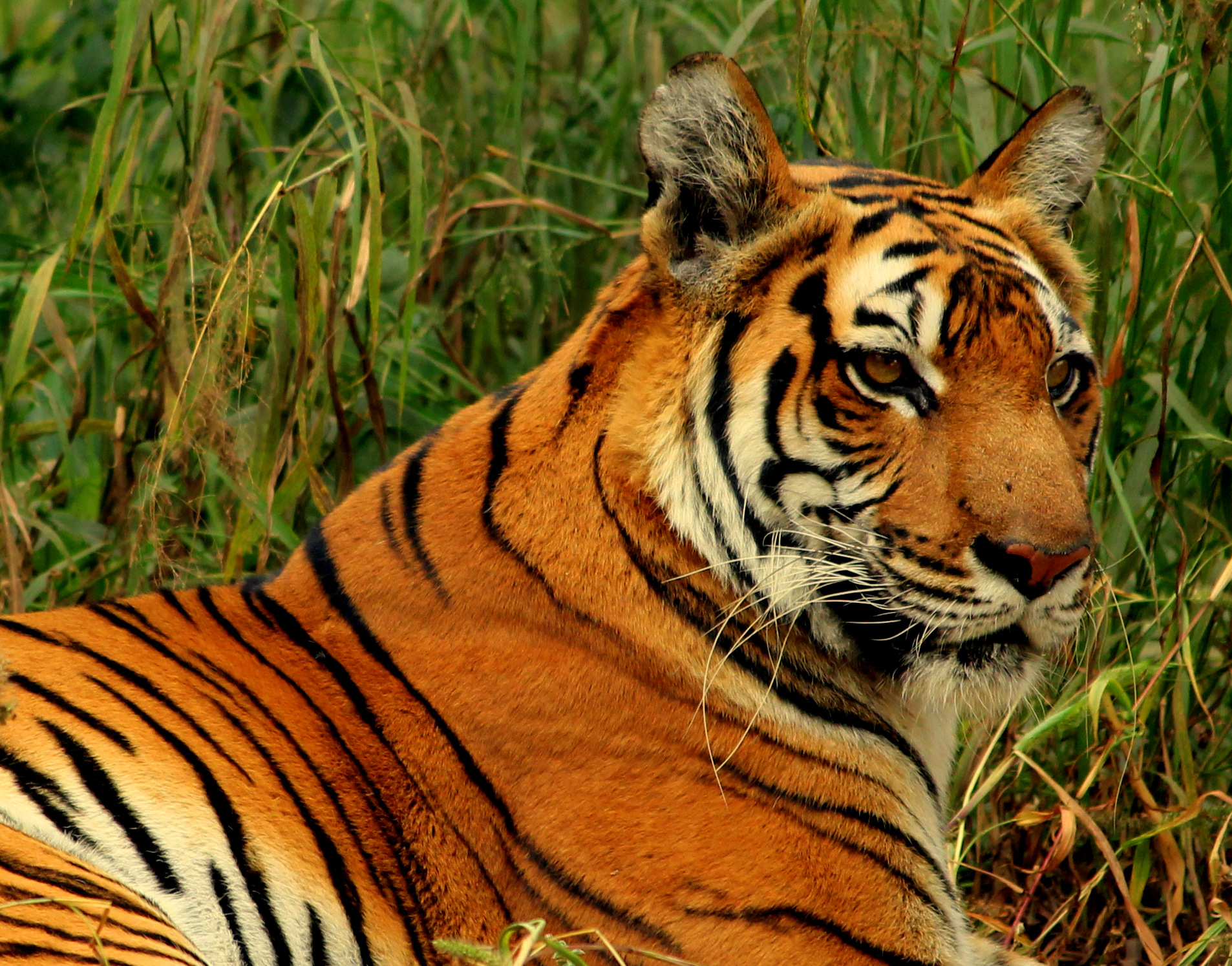
Royal Bengal tiger

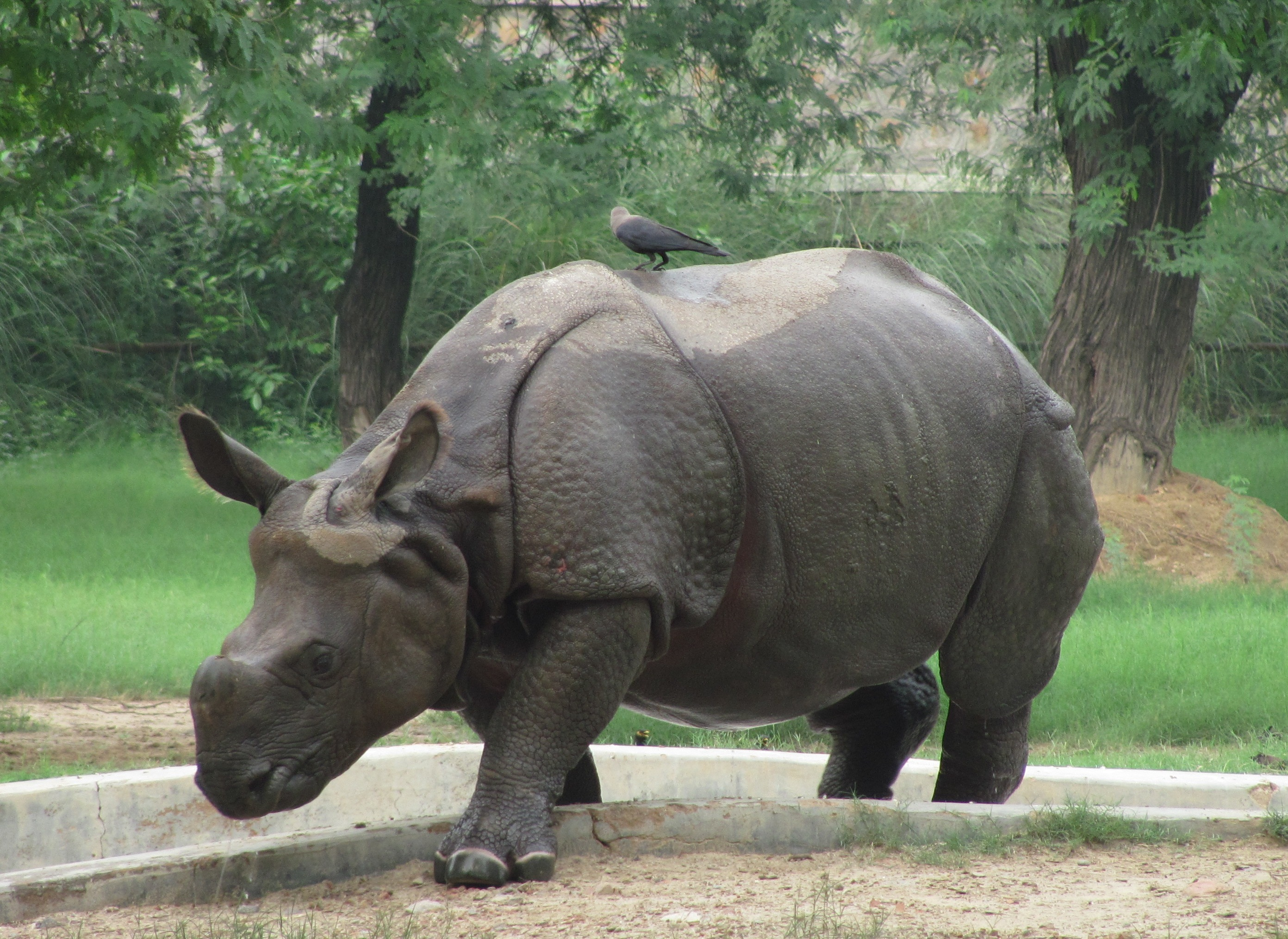
Indian rhinoceros

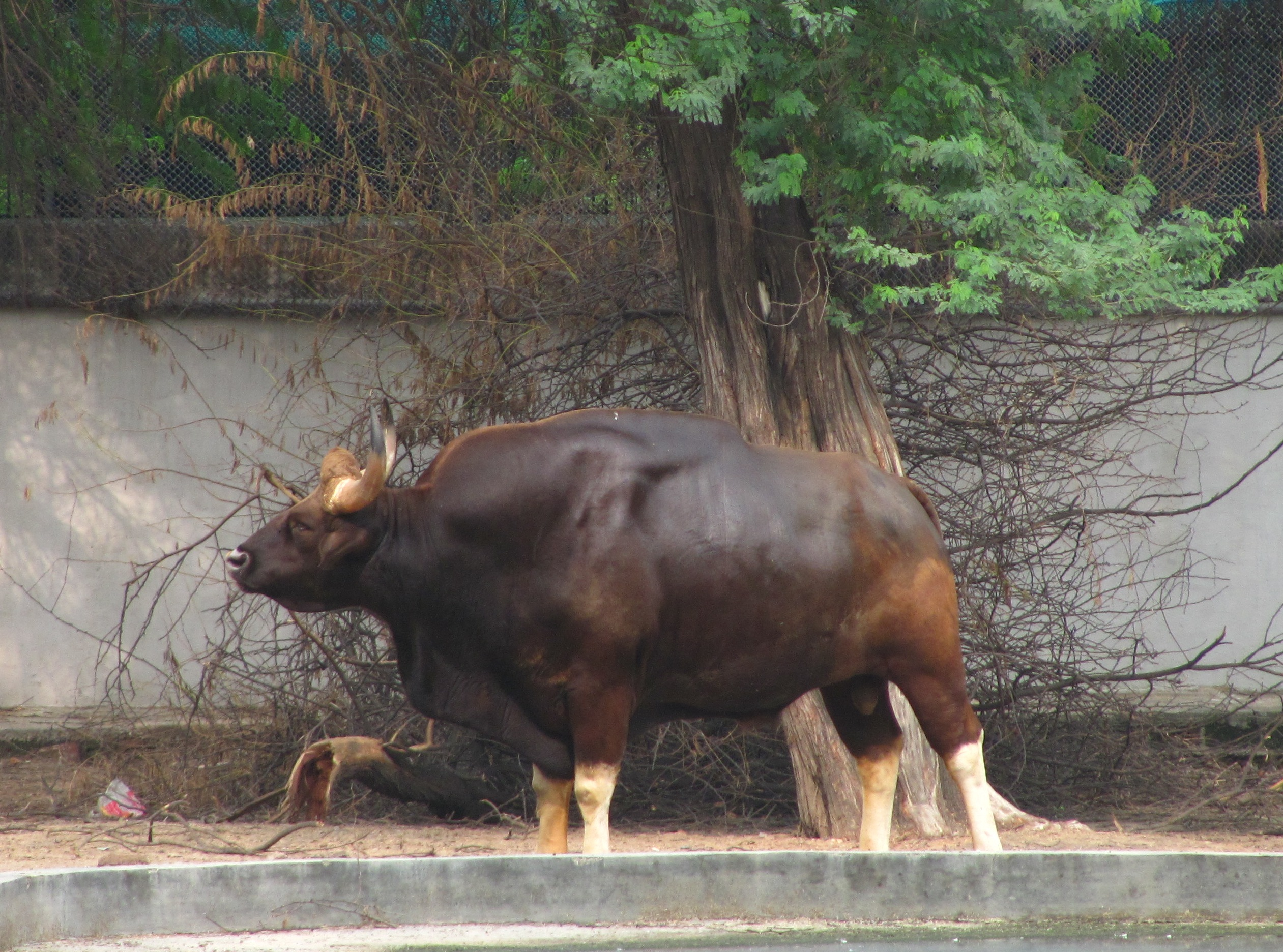
Gaur

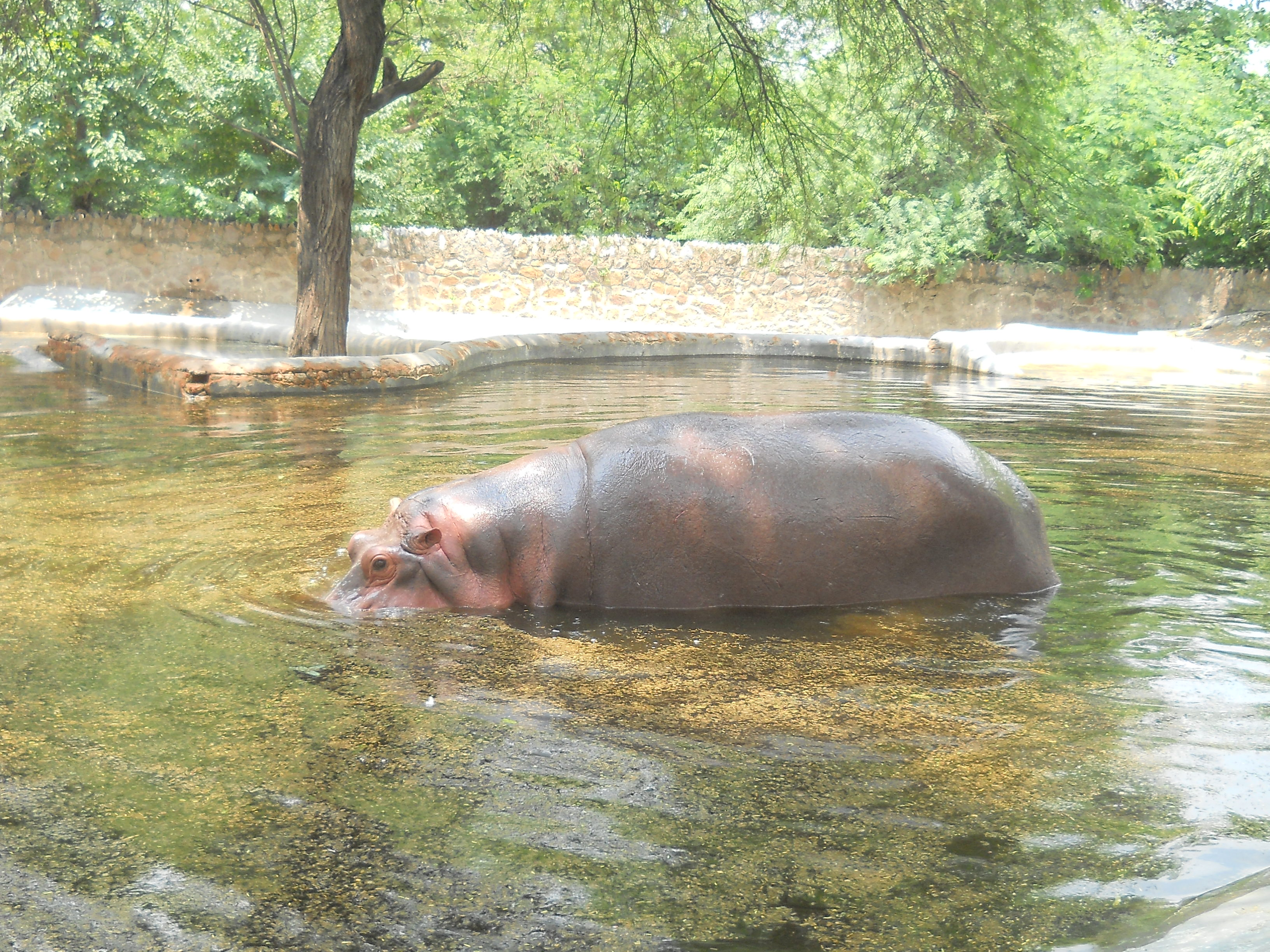
Hippopotamus

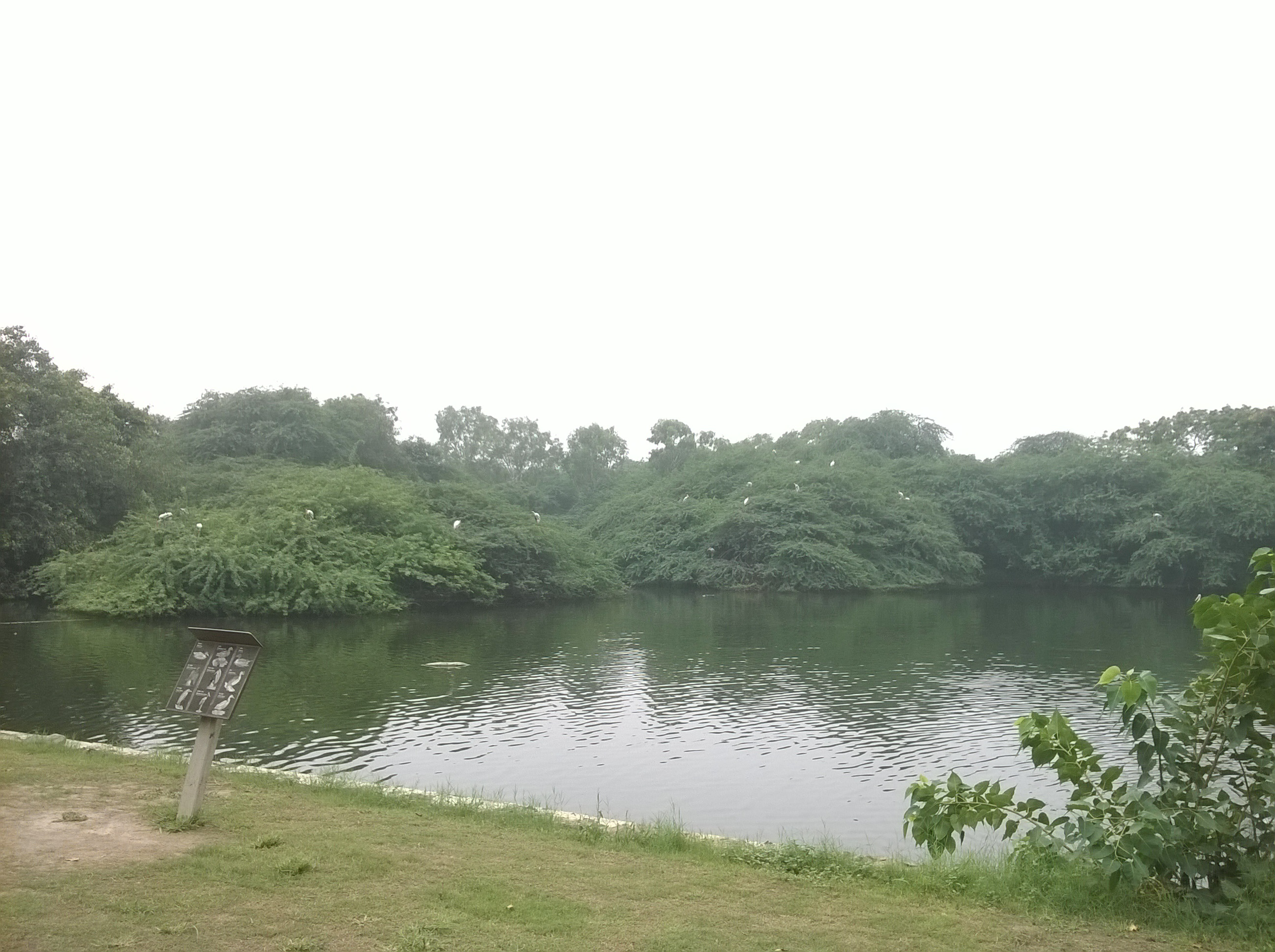
Waterbirds around Lake

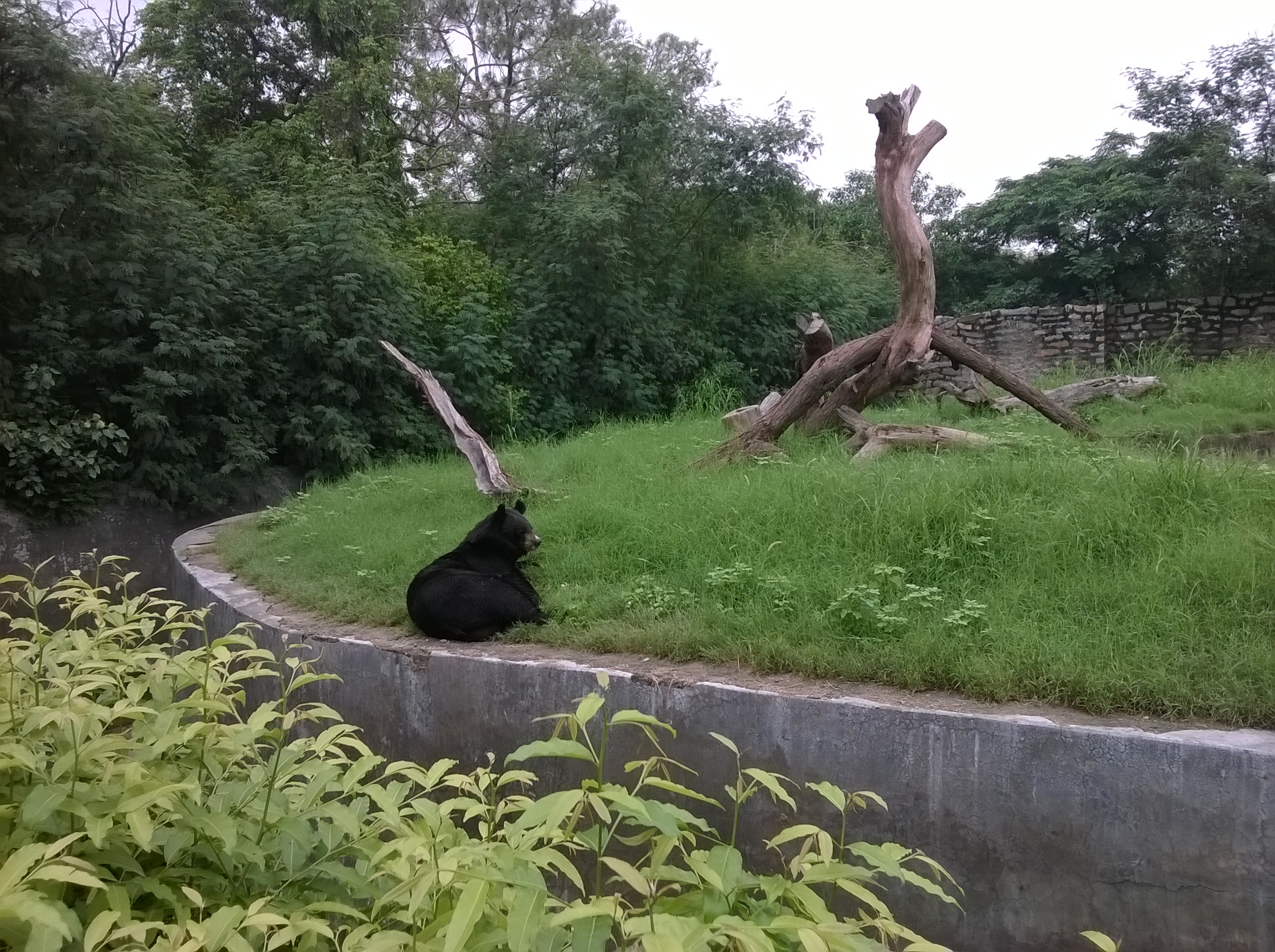
Asian black bear

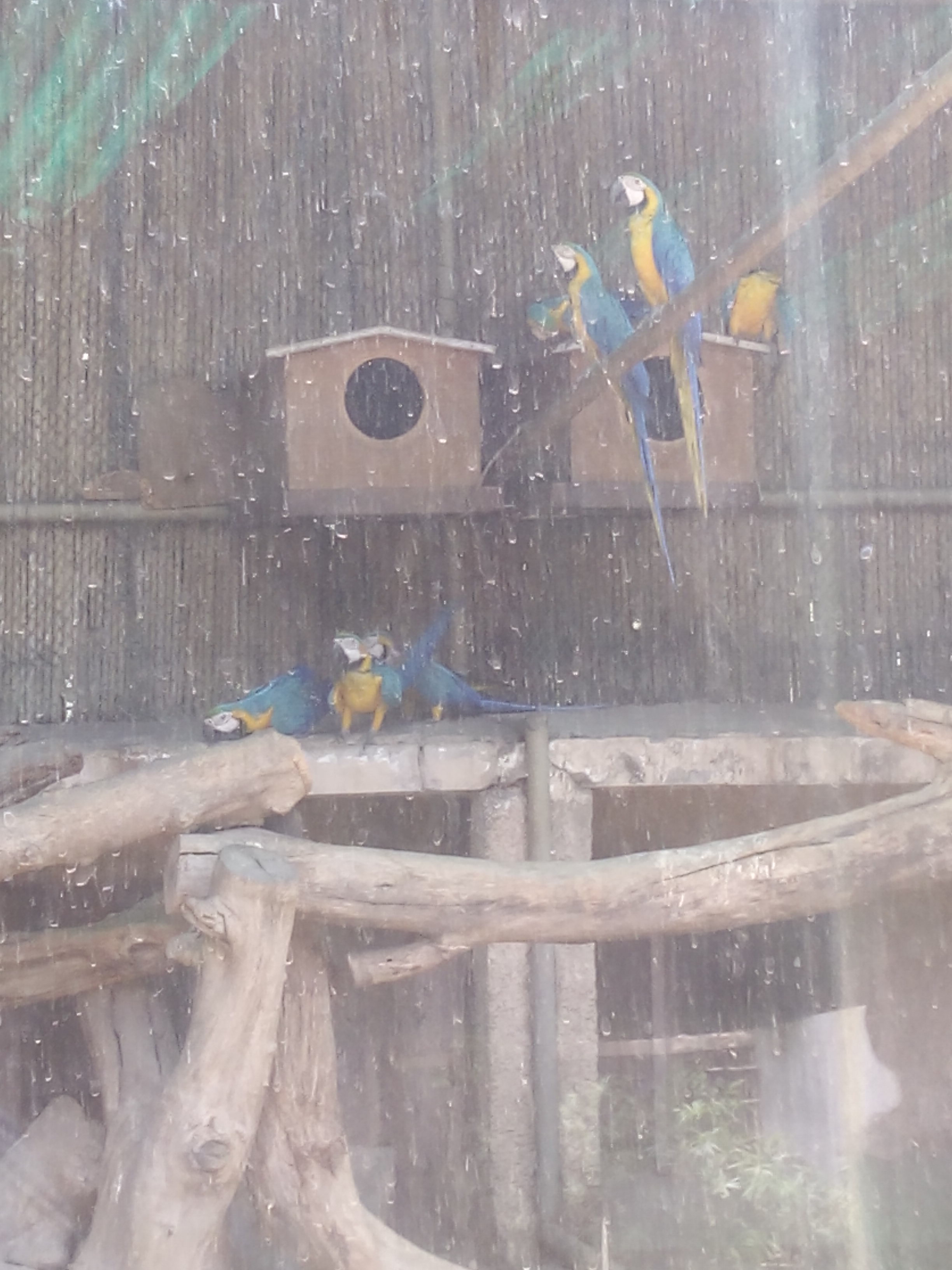
Blue-and-yellow macaw

== See also ==
- Najafgarh drain bird sanctuary, Delhi
- Asola Bhatti Wildlife Sanctuary, Delhi
- Sultanpur National Park, bordering Delhi in adjoining Gurgaon District, Haryana
- Okhla Sanctuary, bordering Delhi in adjoining Uttar Pradesh
