= Subah of Delhi =

Subdivision of the Mughal Empire between 1580–1857

Delhi Subah
- 1580–1857
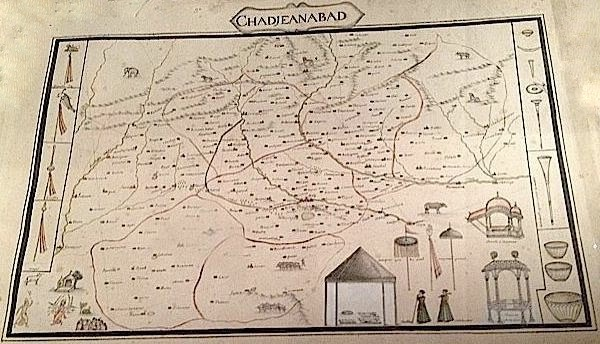
- Elaborately illustrated map of the Delhi Subah of the Mughal Empire commissioned by Jean Baptiste Joseph Gentil, ca.1770
- Capital: Delhi
- Government: Subdivision
- Subedar
- Historical era: Early modern period
  - Established: 1580
  - Siege of Delhi: 21 September 1857

Area
  - 1601: 66,797 sq mi (173,000 km^{2})
Preceded by	Succeeded by
Mughal Empire	Durrani Empire; Sikh Confederacy
- Today part of: India

Delhi Subah, also known as the Shahjahanabad Subah, was one of the subahs (provincial-level administrative division) of the Mughal Empire. During the Mughal Empire, the Punjab region consisted of three subahs: Lahore and Multan subahs, and parts of Delhi Subah.

Delhi remained an important place for the Mughals, who built palaces and forts. Most importantly, Shah Jahan ordered his famous chief architect, Ustad Ahmad Lahori to build the walled city between 1638 and 1649, containing the Lal Qila and the Chandni Chowk. Delhi was one of the original twelve subahs (imperial Mughal provinces), renamed Shahjahanabad in 1648, bordering Awadh, Agra, Ajmer, Multan, and Lahore subahs. Daryaganj had the original cantonment of Delhi, after 1803, where a native regiment of Delhi garrison was stationed, which was later shifted to the Ridge area. East of Daryaganj was Raj ghat Gate of the walled city, opening at Raj Ghat on Yamuna River. The first wholesale market of Old Delhi opened as the hardware market in Chawri Bazaar in 1840, the next wholesale market was that of dry fruits, spices, and herbs at Khari Baoli, opening in 1850. The Phool Mandi (Flower Market) of Daryaganj was established in 1869, and even today, despite serving a small geographical area, it is of great importance due to dense population.

== History ==
The early modern period in Indian history is marked with the rise of the Mughal Empire between the 16th and 18th centuries. After the fall of the Delhi Sultanate, the Mughals ruled from Agra, Sikri and Lahore, but the city once became the capital in 1648 during the rule of Shah Jahan, and remained the capital until the fall of the empire. During this time, Delhi became a center for culture, and poets such as Ghalib, Dard, Dagh and Zauq lived in the city and sought patronage of the emperor. The Mughals also built several monuments in the city including Humayun's Tomb, Red Fort, and Jama Masjid.

=== Babur and Humayun (1526–1556) ===
The first Mughal Emperors Babur (1526–1530) and Humayun (1530–1540, restored 1556–57) ruled from Agra, unlike the preceding Delhi Sultans.

In the mid-16th century there was an interruption in the Mughal rule of India as Sher Shah Suri defeated Humayun and forced him to flee to Persia. Sher Shah Suri built the sixth city of Delhi, as well as the old fort known as Purana Qila, even though this city was settled since the ancient era. After Sher Shah Suri's death in 1545, his son Islam Shah took the reins of north India from Delhi. Islam Shah ruled from Delhi. Then Humayun was briefly restored; but meanwhile in 1553 the Hindu Hemu became the Prime Minister and Chief of Army of Adil Shah.

Hemu fought and won 22 battles in all against rebels and (twice) against the Mughal Akbar's army in Agra and Delhi, without losing any. After defeating Akbar's army on 7 October 1556 at Tughlaqabad fort area in Battle of Delhi, Hemu acceded to Delhi throne and established Hindu Raj in North India for a brief period, taking the title 'Vikramaditya' at his coronation in Purana Quila, Delhi. Hemu was defeated at the second battle of Panipat by Mughal forces led by Akbar's regent Bairam Khan, thus reinstating Mughal rule in the region.

=== Akbar to Aurangzeb (1556–1707) ===
The third and greatest Mughal emperor, Akbar (1556–1605), continued to rule from Agra, resulting in a decline in the fortunes of Delhi.

In the mid-17th century, the Mughal Emperor Shah Jahan (1628–1658) built the city that sometimes bears his name Shahjahanabad, the seventh city of Delhi that is now commonly known as the old city or old Delhi. This city contains a number of significant architectural features, including the Red Fort (Lal Qila) and the Jama Masjid. The city served as the capital of the later Mughal Empire from 1638 onward, when Shah Jahan transferred the capital back from Agra.

Aurangzeb (1658–1707) crowned himself as emperor in Delhi in 1658 at the Shalimar garden ('Aizzabad-Bagh) with a second coronation in 1659.

After 1680, the Mughal Empire's influence declined rapidly as the Hindu Maratha Empire rose to prominence.

=== Decline of Mughals ===
The Mughal Empire suffered several blows due to invasions from Marathas, Jats, Afghans and Sikhs. In 1737, Bajirao I marched towards Delhi with a huge army. The Marathas defeated the Mughals in the First Battle of Delhi. The Maratha forces sacked Delhi following their victory against the Mughals. In 1739, the Mughal Empire lost the huge Battle of Karnal in less than three hours against the numerically outnumbered but military superior Persian army led by Nader Shah during his invasion after which he completely sacked and looted Delhi, the Mughal capital, followed by massacre for 2 days, killing over 30,000 civilians and carrying away immense wealth including the Peacock Throne, the Daria-i-Noor, and Koh-i-Noor. Nader eventually agreed to leave the city and India after forcing the Mughal emperor Muhammad Shah I to beg him for mercy and granting him the keys of the city and the royal treasury.

== Administrative divisions ==
The Delhi Subah was divided into sarkars (equivalent to districts), with them being as follows as per the Ain-i-Akbari:

List of sarkars of Delhi Subah in 1601 (Note: The area of the sarkars is based on the years 1595–6/1601. The revenue figures are the official estimates for jama or naqdī as per the Ain-i-Akbari. However, the revenue figures do not take into account the regional variations in price-levels. The jama' is stated in dams (a copper coin). At the time of the Ain-i-Akbari one rupee was worth 40 dams.)
No.	Name	Area (sq. mi.)	Revenue (dams)
1.	Delhi Sarkar	7,962 mi^{2}	123,012,596
2.	Badaun Sarkar	5,628 mi^{2}	34,817,063
3.	Kumaun Sarkar	18,846 mi^{2}	45,437,700
4.	Sambhal Sarkar	5,585 mi^{2}	66,941,431
5.	Saharanpur Sarkar	3,480 mi^{2}	87,839,859
6.	Rewari Sarkar	1,201 mi^{2}	28,807,718
7.	Hissar Firuza Sarkar	12,445 mi^{2}	52,554,905
8.	Sirhind Sarkar	11,650 mi^{2}	160,790,549
Total for the subah:		66,797 mi^{2}	600,201,821

The sarkars were subdivided into pargannahs (equivalent to sub-districts or tehsils). For example, the Sirhind Sarkar was further subdivided into twenty-eight pargannahs spread across the Yamuna-Sutlej Doab.

== See also ==
- Administrative divisions of India
- Delhi Territory
- Subah or Taraf, Pargana or Mahal, Mauza or Pir
