= Sadia Rashid =

Pakistani businessman

President of the Hamdard Foundation
- Incumbent
- Assumed office 17 October 1998
- Preceded by: Hakim Said

Chancellor of the Hamdard University

Personal details
- Born: Sadia Said; 1946 (age 79–80) Old Delhi, British India
- Citizenship: British subject (1946–1948); Pakistani (1948–)
- Spouse: Rashid Munir Ahmad (m. 1970; died 2022)
- Children: 3
- Parents: Hakim Muhammad Said (father); Naimat Begum (mother)
- Education: University of Karachi
- Awards: Order of the Rising Sun, Gold Rays with Neck Ribbon (2019) Hilal-i-Imtiaz (2024)

Sadia Rashid (born 1946) is a Pakistani educationist who is the current president of Hamdard Pakistan, chancellor of the Hamdard University and president of the Pakistan-Japan Cultural Association (PJCA).

== Early life ==
She was born in 1946 in Sitaram Bazar, Old Delhi, India to Hakim Said (Shaheed) and Naimat Begum. Her ancestors came from Kashgar (now Kashi, Xinjiang, China) to the Indian subcontinent, in the reign of the Mughal emperor, Shah Alam. They first stayed at Peshawar for about eighteen years, then moved to Multan and lastly settled down at Delhi. In January 1948, her family migrated to Karachi after the establishment of Pakistan.

She received her education from St Joseph's Convent School, Karachi and St Joseph's College, Karachi. Then she completed her Masters of Arts in Sociology from Karachi University.

== Personal life ==
In 1970, she married a barrister, Rashid Munir Ahmad, with whom she has three daughters, MaheNeemah (known as Maham), Amena Mian, and Fatema Zahra Munir Ahmed, who is currently serving as MD/CEO of Hamdard Lab (Waqf) Pak.

On 7 February 2022, her husband Rashid Munir Ahmad died.

== Awards ==
In February 2019, Sadia was awarded the Order of the Rising Sun, Gold Rays with Neck Ribbon, from the Japanese government in recognition of "her contribution for promoting cultural relations and mutual understanding between Japan and Pakistan."

On 14 August 2024, Sadia was awarded the Hilal-i-Imtiaz, from the Government of Pakistan in recognition of "her exceptional contribution to the field of Education".
