= Khari Baoli =

Coordinates: 28.6588423°N 77.2211152°E

- Neighborhood of Delhi
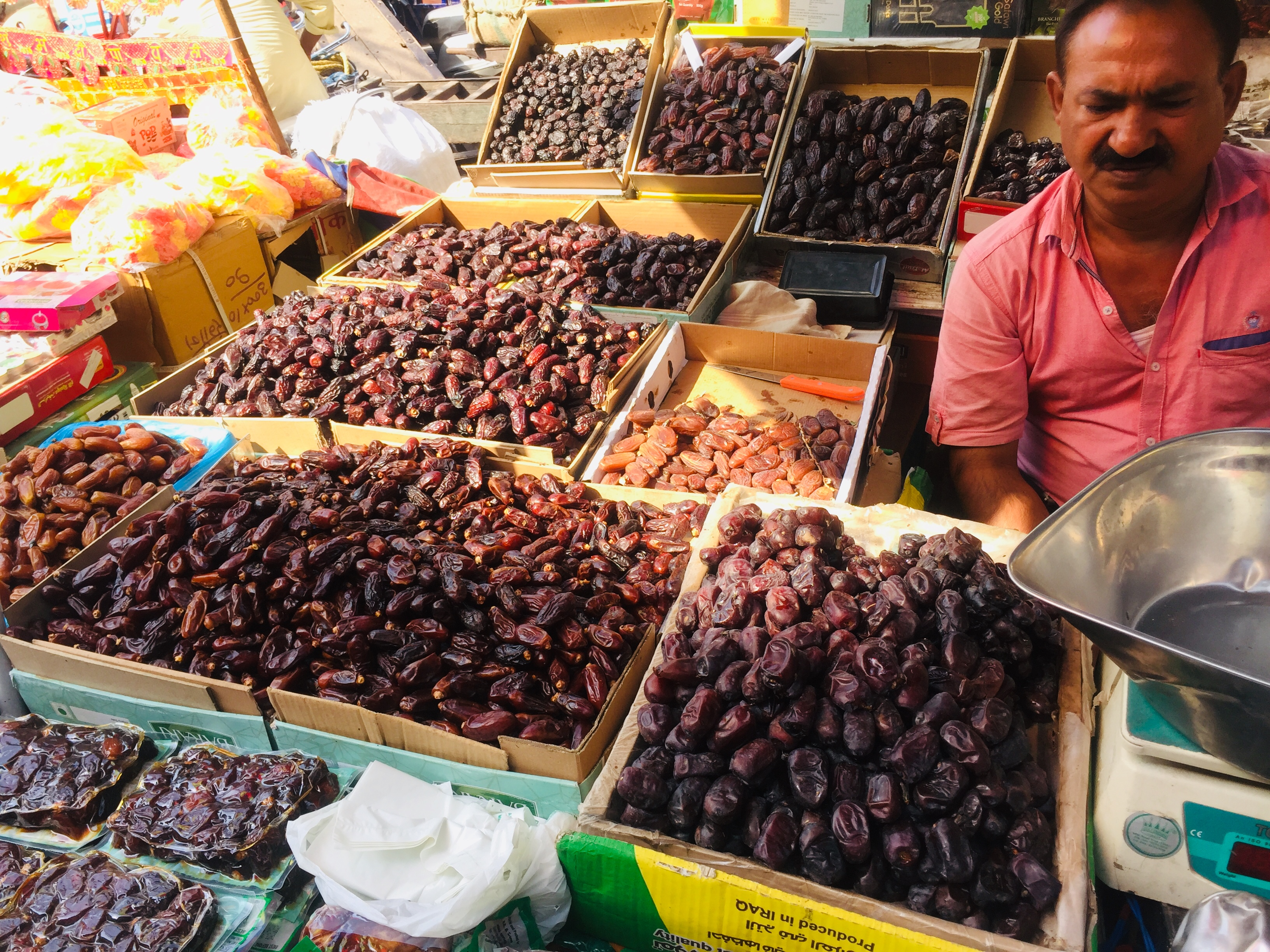
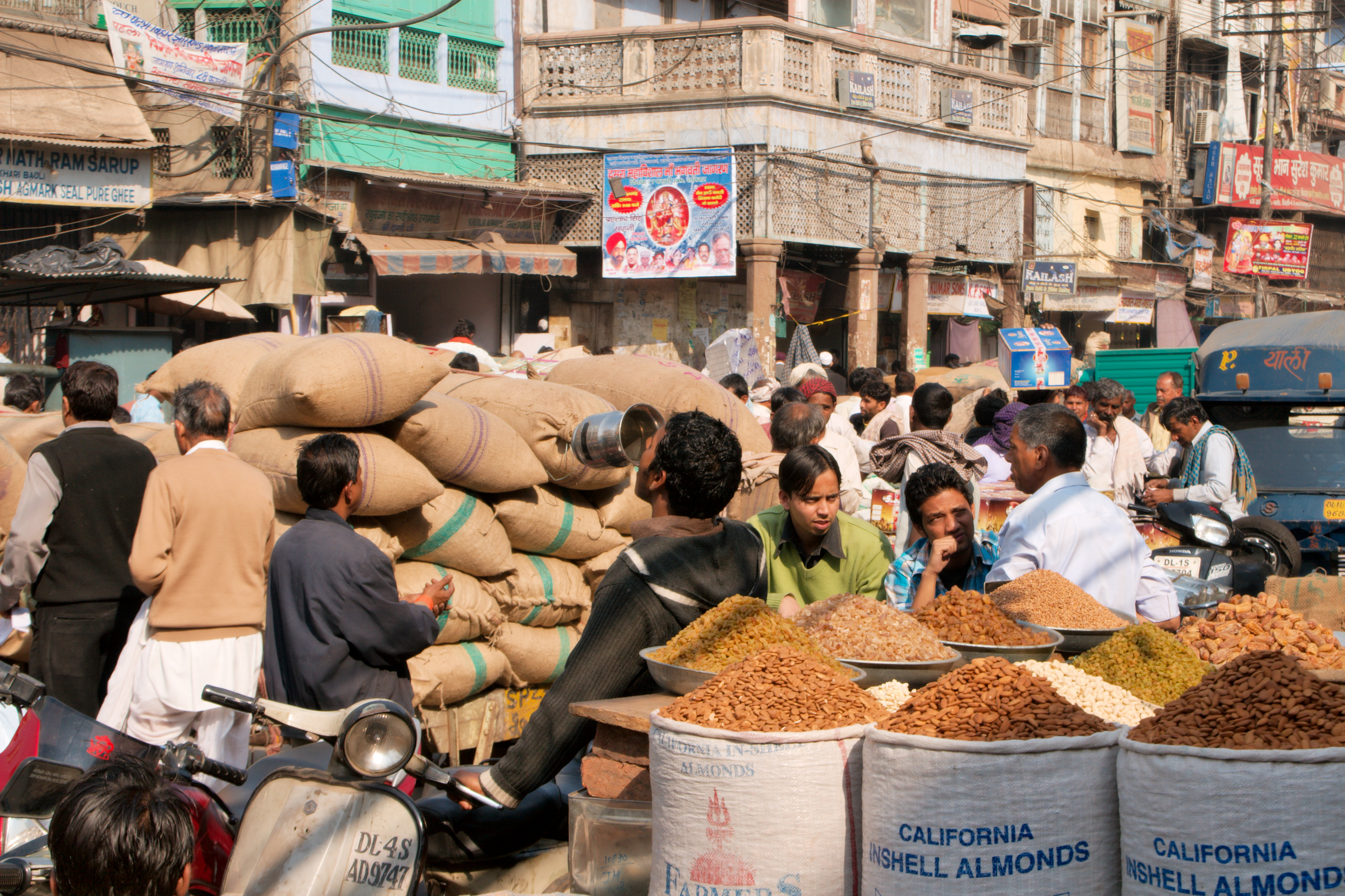
- Top: A shop selling dates in Khari Baoli; Bottom: Californian almonds being sold in Old Delhi's Khari Baoli market.

- Location in Delhi, India
- Country: India
- State: Delhi

Languages
  - Official: Hindi
- Time zone: UTC+5:30 (IST)

Khari Baoli (Hindustani: [kʰ aːriː baːwriː]) is a street in Old Delhi, India known for its wholesale grocery and Asia's largest wholesale spice market. It sells a variety of spices, nuts, herbs, and food products like rice and tea. Operating since the 17th century, the market is situated near the historic Delhi Red Fort, on the Khari Baoli Road adjacent to Fatehpuri Masjid at the western end of the Chandni Chowk, and over the years has remained a tourist attraction, especially those in the heritage circuit of Old Delhi.

== History ==
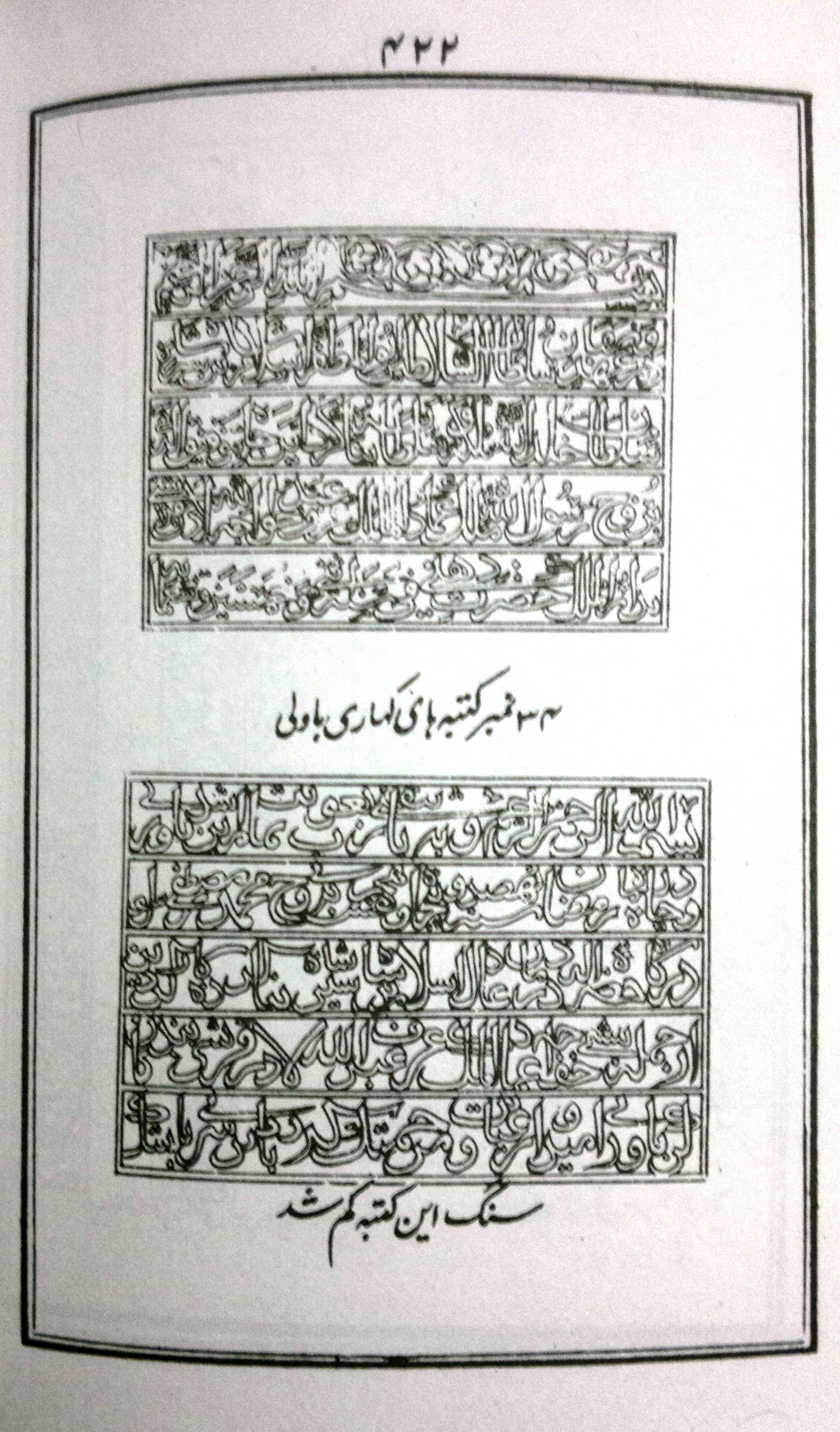
Inscriptions from the 'Khari Baoli' step-well

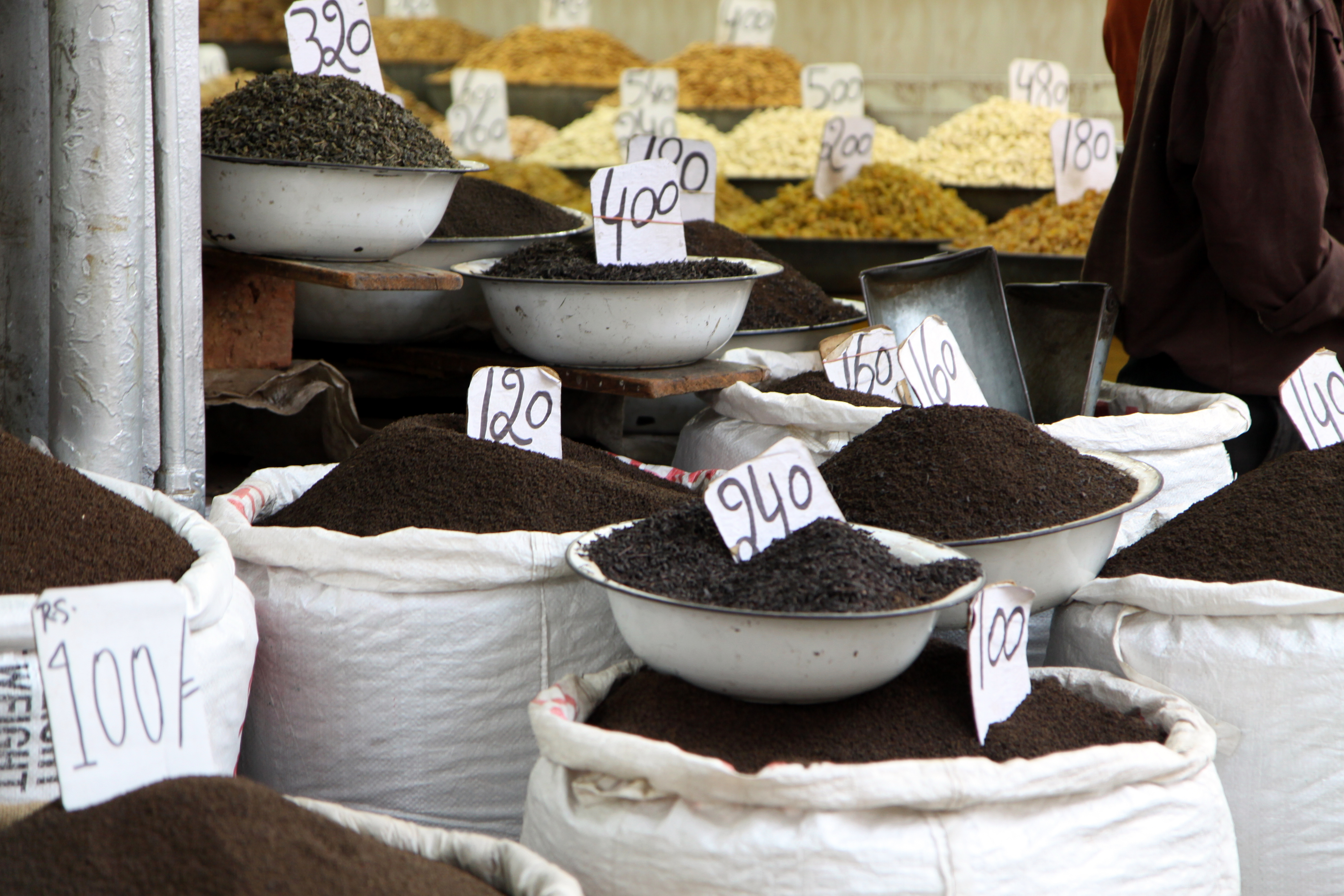
Shop selling tea leaves, at Khari Baoli.

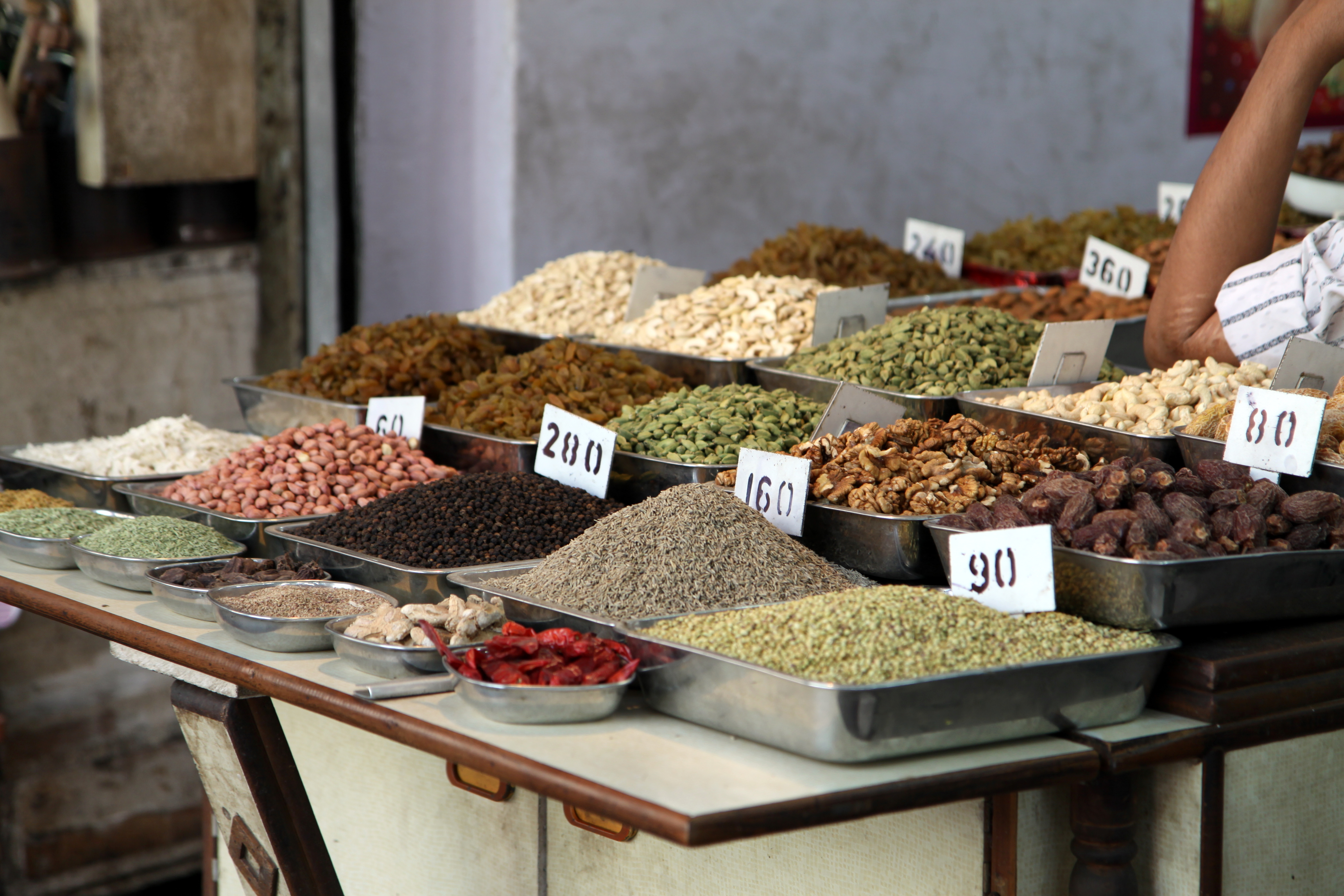
Shop selling spices, at Khari Baoli.

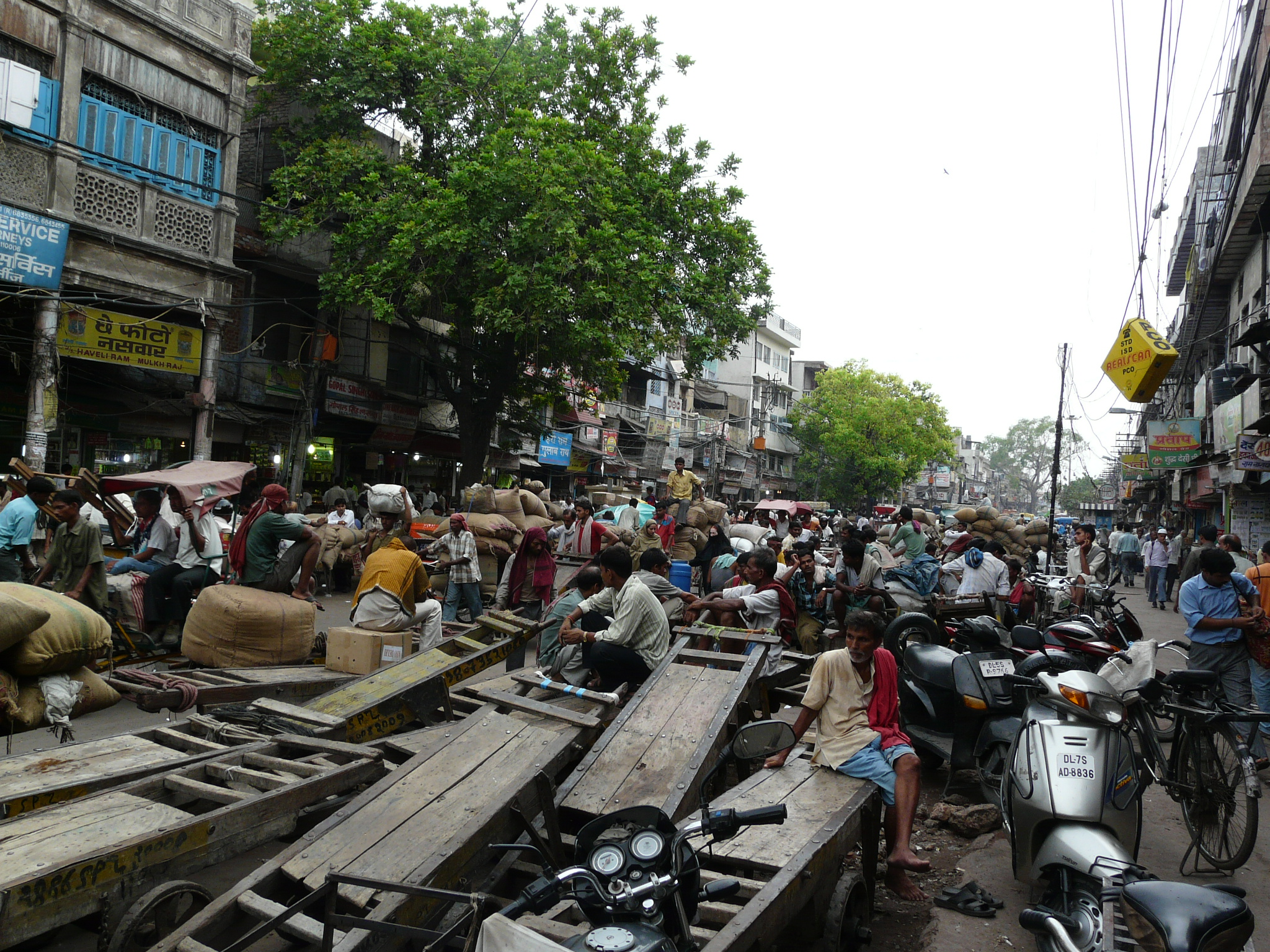
Carts parked on the Spice Market, Khari Baoli Road.

Foundations of the Khari Baoli step-well were laid by Khwaja Abdullah Laazar Qureshi during the reign of Islam Shah (Salim Shah), the son of Sher Shah Suri. The work on this building was completed in the year 1551. In the present day, nothing remains of this baoli, save copies of inscriptions that were preserved in works like Aasar Us Sanadeed (Sir Syed Ahmad Khan) and Miftah Al Tawarikh.

Persian text of the inscriptions (see adjoining image):

1. Top inscription, which was situated close to the eleventh step of the well on the southern wall of the second floor -

بِسم الله الرحمن الرحیم در عهد زمان شاه سلطان السلاطین و المظفر اسلام شاه بن شیر شاه سلطان خلد الله ملکه و سلطانه بنا کرده این چاه بتوفیق الله و بروح رسول الله ملک عماد الملک عرف خواجه عبد الله لاذر قریشی بدار الملک حضرت دهلی فی سنه اثنی و خمسین و تسعمأته

"Bismillah Al Rahman Al Rahim Dar Ahd Zaman Shah Sultan Al Salateen W Alam Zafar Islam Shah Bin Sher Shah Sultan Khalid Allah Malik W Sultan Bana Kar Do In Shah Batawfiq Allah W Barooh Rasool Allah Malik Asad Al Malik Arf Khwaja Abid Allah La Zar Qureshi Bad Ar Al Malik Hazrat Delhi Fi San Asni W Khamsin W Tasmat"

Literal English Translation:

"In the name of Allah, the Most Gracious, the Most Merciful, during the era of Shah Sultan Sultan and Al-Muzaffar, Islam Shah bin Sher Shah Sultan Khaldullah made a queen and a queen. Khamsin and Tasamata"

2. Bottom inscription, which was situated somewhere above the entrance - بِسم الله الرحمن الرحیم و به یبقنی یا رب بعونت تمام شُد این باولی و چاه در ماهِ رمضان سنه نهصد و پنجاه و هشت هجری بروح محمد مصطفی رسول درگاه حضرة اله در زمان عادل اسلام شاه بن شیر شاه بنا کرده کار گردِ دین از جمله بیشی خواجه عماد المُلک عرف لاذر قریشی بنده کار گردِ باولی اُمید وار عنایت و برحمتک گردد با برسری بالیستک

"Bism Allah Al Rahman Al Rahim W Ba ybqni Ya Rab Baonnat Tamam Shad Ayen Baoli W Chah Dar Mahi Ramzan San Nahast W Panjah W Hasht Hijri Bar W H Mohammad Mustafi Rasool Dargah Hazrat Al Dar Zaman Al Dil Islam Shah Bin Sher Shah Bin Kar D H Kar Gar Di Deen Az Jumla Baishi Khwaza Amad Al Mulk Arf La Zar Qureshi Bandh Kargar Di Baoli Umeed W Ar Inayat W Bar Hamtak Gar D D Babar Sri Balistak."

Literal English Translation:

"In the name of Allah, the Merciful, the Merciful, and with the help of the Lord, in the month of Ramadan, nine hundred and fifty-eight Hijri, in the spirit of Muhammad Mustafa, the Messenger of God, the Dargah of Hazrat Allah was built in the time of Adil Islam by Shah Bin Sher Shah, including Beshi Khawaja. Imad-ul-Mulk aka Lazar Qureshi is a servant of God, who is blessed with hope and mercy."

The market came up around the Fatehpuri Masjid, which was built in 1650 by Fatehpuri Begum, one of Mughal Emperor Shah Jahan's wives. During Shah Jahan's reign it came to be known as Khari Baoli (from Baoli, meaning step well, and Khari or Khara, meaning salty) from a saline water stepwell used for animals and for bathing. It was constructed along with a fortified gateway on its western end popularly known as Lahori Gate, one of the 14 gates of the fortified city of Delhi or Shahjahanabad, named so because a road through it led to the city of Lahore, now in Pakistan. However, today there is no trace of either the well or gateway, with both now lying buried under the main road of the market.

In 1936, Chowdhary Chhotu Ram, a minister in the Punjab Government, issued a law cancelling all debts of the villagers. Thus numerous Agrawal traders lost their businesses and migrated to Delhi, settling in colonies like Kamla Nagar, Shakti Nagar and Model Basti, and taking their trade to locations around the walled city of Old Delhi, especially Chandni Chowk, Khari Baoli, Dariba Kalan, Nai Sarak, Naya Bazaar, Sadar Bazaar and Chawri Bazaar.

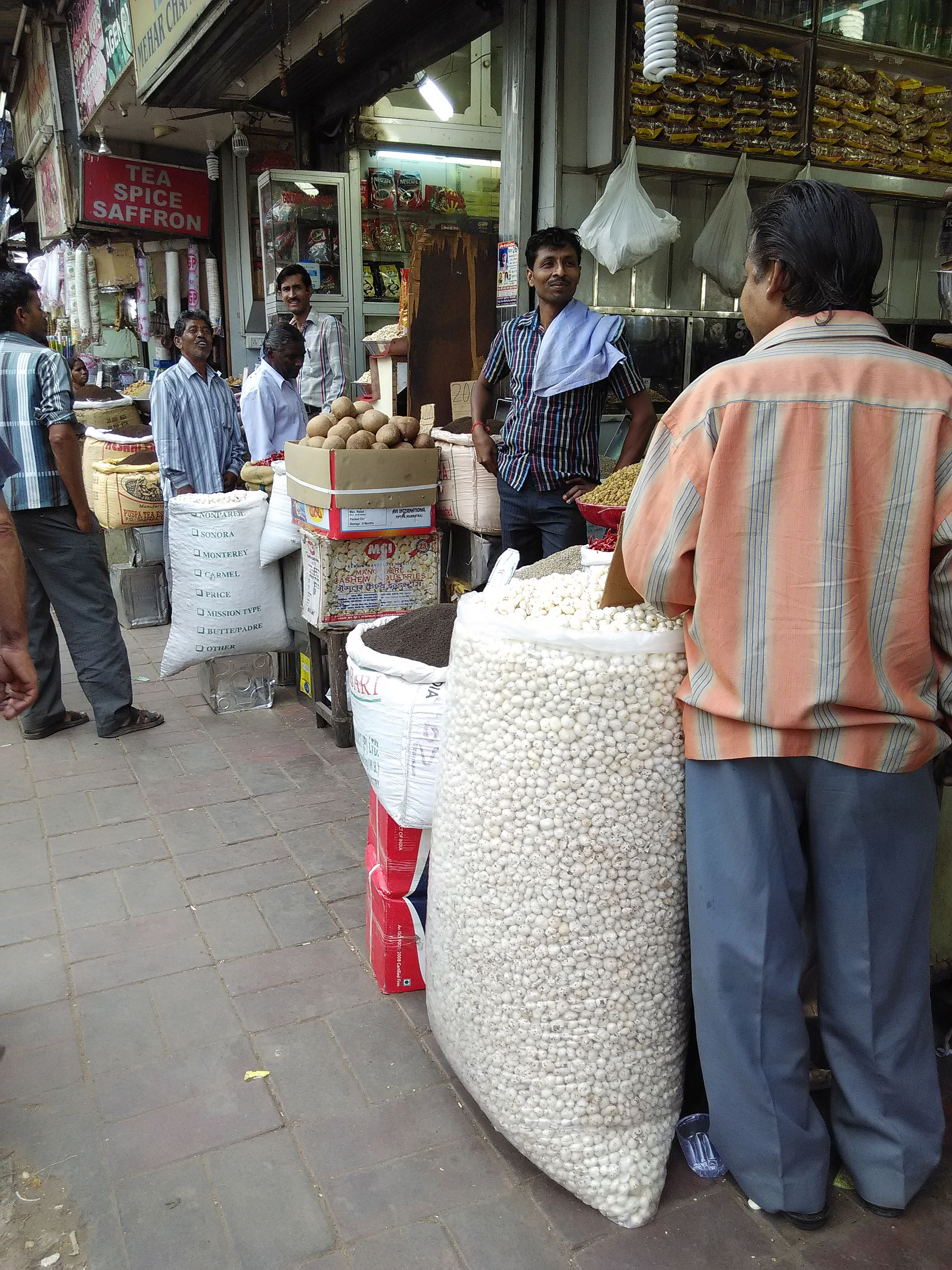
Running since the 17th century, the Khari Baoli market is nestled near the historic area of old Delhi adjacent to the Fatehpuri Masjid.

Here, many shops are still known by their serial numbers, e.g., "Chawal Wale 13" or "21 Number Ki Dookan," and are run by the ninth- or the tenth generation of the founders of these establishments dating to the 17th and 18th centuries. One such famous pickle shop which originally started in the 1860s is that of Harnarains, and currently operates under the name Harnarains International. They've been serving the nation for over a century and a half, and have landed on the tables of people like Jawaharlal Nehru and Indira Gandhi.

== Overview ==
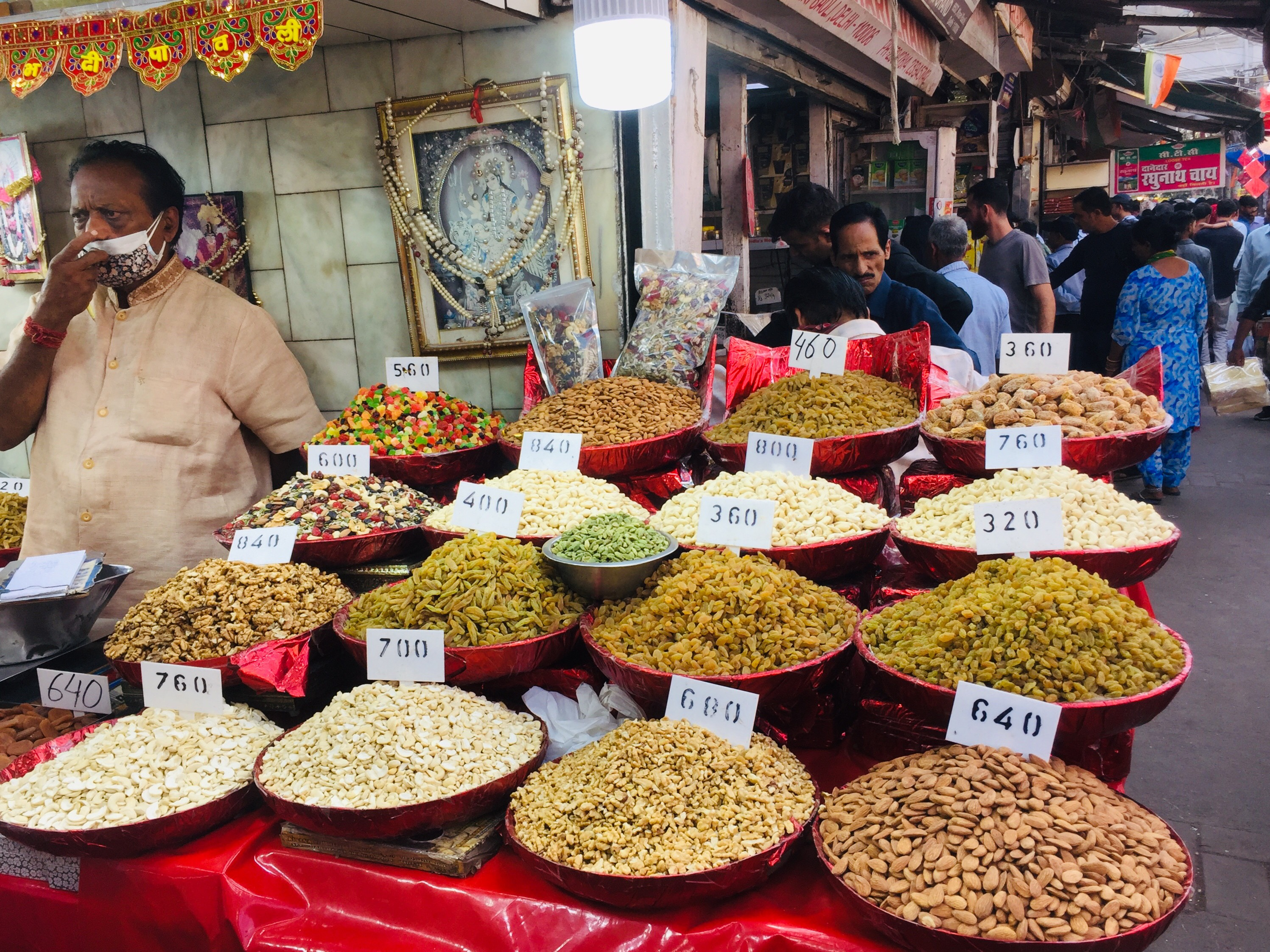
Dry fruits being sold at Khari Baoli market

"Gadodia Market", situated on the south side of Khari Baoli, was built by wealthy merchants in the 1920s and is Asia's largest wholesale spice market. Today, Khari Baoli is also a busy commercial district, as it caters to the vast spice market of North India, including states of Jammu and Kashmir, Rajasthan and even as far as Madhya Pradesh.

There is a wholesale market for genuine herbs in Katara Tambaku. The other end of the Khari Baoli market is on the GB Road (red light district and wholesale market for engineering goods) and Sadar Bazar (wholesale market for non-branded consumer goods).
