= Yamuna Pushta =

Coordinates: 28.6589°N 77.24738°E

- Neighbourhood of Delhi
- Location in Delhi, India
- Country: India
- State: Delhi

Languages
  - Official: Hindi
- Time zone: UTC+5:30 (IST)

Yamuna Pushta is the Pushta (embankment) on both sides of the Yamuna River in Delhi, starting from the ITO bridge and up to the Salimgarh Fort. It has also been home to riverbed cultivators, and over 100,000 residents in a string of slum colonies (shantytown) for some 40 years, mostly on the western banks, like those near the Nigambodh Ghat (cremation ghats) near Old Delhi and a few on the eastern banks like those near Sakarpur village in East Delhi. Many of these slums were being demolished in 2004, after court orders which were part of the beautification drive of the Government ahead of the 2010 Commonwealth Games and for creating a "green belt".

== Delhi slums ==
Delhi slums were developed by the migrant populations who could not afford land in the city, encroaching upon the riverbed. The Master Plan of the city described the area as "floodable". Hence, permanent structures were never built by the government. Early settlers bought land from local farmers, some reclaimed land while others encroached. Thus grew several jhuggi clusters on both sides of the Yamuna river. With the Yamuna flooding each monsoon, the residents of many of the lower-lying slums were uprooted, taking refuge within the city. Yet year after year, these slums grew despite remaining outside the purview of urban development within the city, and basic facilities remained minimal, and many stayed on because they developed into valuable vote banks. Another important reason for their development right up to the Nizamuddin Bridge in recent years was the availability of work opportunities in the vicinity.

The first resettlement drive in Yamuna Pushta took place in 1967, and the residents of the slum near Jamuna Bazar near Nigambodh Ghat were settled in Welcome Colony in East Delhi, however with more migrants regularly pouring in, these slums kept on refilling. Then, the 1982 Asian Games saw nearly a million migrant labourers coming in to construct games-related infrastructure.

Then in the early 2000s, the government activated its plans for the 118-acre (0.48 km^{2}) Games Village to house the 8,500 athletes and other sports persons visiting Delhi during the 2010 Commonwealth Games, and also started an ambitious project of restoring and beautifying the 22 km-long stretch of Yamuna floodplain. The Delhi High Court gave orders for demolition of the slums at Yamuna Pushta in May 2002, and in MCD had issued an eviction notice to the jhuggi (makeshift huts) dwellers on 12 January 2004 and at least 5,000 school-age children were to be affected by the drive. Slumdwellers had been asked to pay up Rs 7,000 per house as the residents offered to shift to resettlement colonies such as Holambi Kalan, Bawana, Narela and Madanpur Khadar, by the slum and Jhuggi Jhonpari Department of the Municipal Corporation of Delhi (MCD), though most of them became homeless since they could not even afford these costs, and further the city had virtually no low-income housing that was affordable and legal.

The slums were eventually demolished in a drive that started in March 2004, after the Election Commission gave its permission ahead of the Lok Sabha elections, and registration forms were issued to the residents. In this drive 1,000 slum clusters from Gautampurui-I and Koyla Basti of Yamuna Pushta were demolished, in all more than 18,000 slum clusters from both sides of the Yamuna river. As later studied revealed, the income of most of resettled residents decreased by 50 percent.

Subsequently, an eight-lane express highway was opened there in 2007, paving the way for the construction of the 2010 Commonwealth Games Village and beautification drive of the Yamuna banks before it. By October 2009, nearly 400,000 people from three large slum clusters, of Yamuna Pushta, Nanglamachi and Bhatti mines had been relocated

== Aftermath ==
In 2006, a book Yamuna Gently Weeps: A Journey into the Yamuna Pushta Slum Demolitions was published about the demolition of Yamuna Pushta., and a documentary film by the same name made by Ruzbeh N Bharucha was also released.

As of 2010, the area continues to be a home for numerous homeless people, out of the 1,00,000 homeless living on the streets of Delhi, where after cold deaths here, the revenue department put up tents in January 2010
