= Nili Chhatri =

Hindu temple in India

- Location in Delhi

Religion
- Affiliation: Hinduism
- Deity: Shiva

Location
- Location: Old Delhi
- Country: India
- Coordinates: 28.662°N 77.241°E

Nili Chhatri Temple (Neeli Chhatri) is an ancient Hindu temple in Old Delhi, India dedicated to Shiva. It is believed that the eldest Pandava brother, Prince Yudhishthira of Mahabharata, established the temple and the Nigambodh Ghat adjacent to it, and conducted Aswamedha Yajna from here. The temple located in the Yamuna bazaar area close to the Baharadur Shahi Gate of Salimgarh Fort, on Ring Road (Mahatma Gandhi Marg) close to the banks of the Yamuna river exists even today. The temple has been mentioned only infrequently in various chronicles of Delhi.

== Nili Chhatri tomb ==
Nili Chhatri is the tomb of Naubat Khan. Naubat Khan was a mansabdar (state official) during the time of Akbar. He built it during his lifetime in 1565 CE.

The tomb is called Nili Chhatri due to the colour of its dome which was originally ornamented with blue caustic tiles. The tomb stands almost midway between Purana Qila and the tomb of Nizamuddin Auliya. It is built in an enclosure of several acres. Though the walls of the tomb are not extant in its entirety, some portions of it can still be seen in the surrounding area. But the gateway is relatively in good shape. At the entrance of the tomb is written the inscription, the letters of the inscription are of black marble inlaid on sandstone. The eyes of Time did not see in this world Such a beautiful and lofty building, Of knowledge, the date of its completion, I asked, (it) replied, (it has) attained completion.

Behind the gateway is a small building with three doors. On the back of this building is a high octagonal terrace about 6 feet (1.8 m) from the ground and 79 feet (24 m) in diameter. In the middle of the southern wall of the terrace there are two flights of steps, on opposite sides, which lead to a landing on a level with the top of the terrace. On the north-eastern and north-western corners of the terrace there are two graves of masonry and stone. On each of the four corners of the terrace are the ruins of a tower. In the center of the ‘chabutrah’ is the mausoleum of Naubat Khan. It is octagonal in shape having 51 feet (16 m) as its diameter and about 34 feet (10 m) high. The whole of the tomb is built of stone and masonry and ornamented with encaustic tiles of four colours i.e. green, blue, yellow, and orange. The verses from Quran can be seen in the tomb. The tomb has eight arched entrances which are about 5 feet (1.5 m) wide and 7 feet (2.1 m) high. Above these doorways are open arched niches. The walls of the tomb have steps. The first set of steps takes the visitor to the level of the open niches over the doorways. The second set of steps which are twelve in number leads to the top of the building. The roof of the tomb is flat, but on its center there is an octagonal ‘chabutrah’ about 5 feet (1.5 m) high and 30 feet (9.1 m) in diameter which supports another octagonal ‘chabutrah’ 23 feet (7.0 m) in diameter and about 2 feet (0.61 m) high. This second ‘chabutrah’ bears marks of eight pillars. It was on these pillars that the blue enameled dome was raised which also began to be called as Nili Chhatri.
