= Nigambodh Ghat =

Religion
- Affiliation: Hinduism

Location
- Country: India
- Interactive map of Nigambodh Ghat
- Coordinates: 28°39′52.741″N 77°14′12.922″E

Nigambodh Ghat is a historic ghat, located on the banks of the Yamuna river coast in Delhi, India, situated on the Ring Road, Delhi behind the historic Red Fort. It consists of a series of bathing and ceremonial stepped piers leading to the waters of the river. It is the oldest burning ghat in Delhi for performing Antyesti, funeral rites of the dead in Hinduism, with an estimated 50–60 cremations a day. It also has an electric crematorium built in the 1950s, and a CNG-run crematorium was added by the Municipal corporation with manages the cremation facilities, in 2006.

== Etymology ==
It is believed that it was on this ghat during the Mahabharata era, that Lord Brahma, Hindu God of Creation, had bathed and recovered his lost memory and sacred books and hence the name Nigambodh Ghat, literally realisation of knowledge.

== Overview ==
It is believed that the ghats were established by the eldest Pandava brother, Prince Yudhishthira, the king of Indraprastha. At present, the ghat area includes the largest and busiest cremation ground in Delhi, where the Antyesti, Hindu funeral rites are carried out.

Nili Chatri mandir dedicated to Lord Shiva, also established by Yudhishthira nearby. Also adjacent to the ghat and nearer to the Salimgarh Fort, stood the Nigambodh Gate, of the walled city of Old Delhi then known as Shahjahanabad, built during Mughal Empire. However, the gate no longer exists as when the Yamuna river changed its course the gate disappeared and fell out of maintenance.

== See also ==
- Antyesti
- Manikarnika Ghat
- Yamuna Pushta
