= Sitaram Bazar =

Locality in Delhi, India

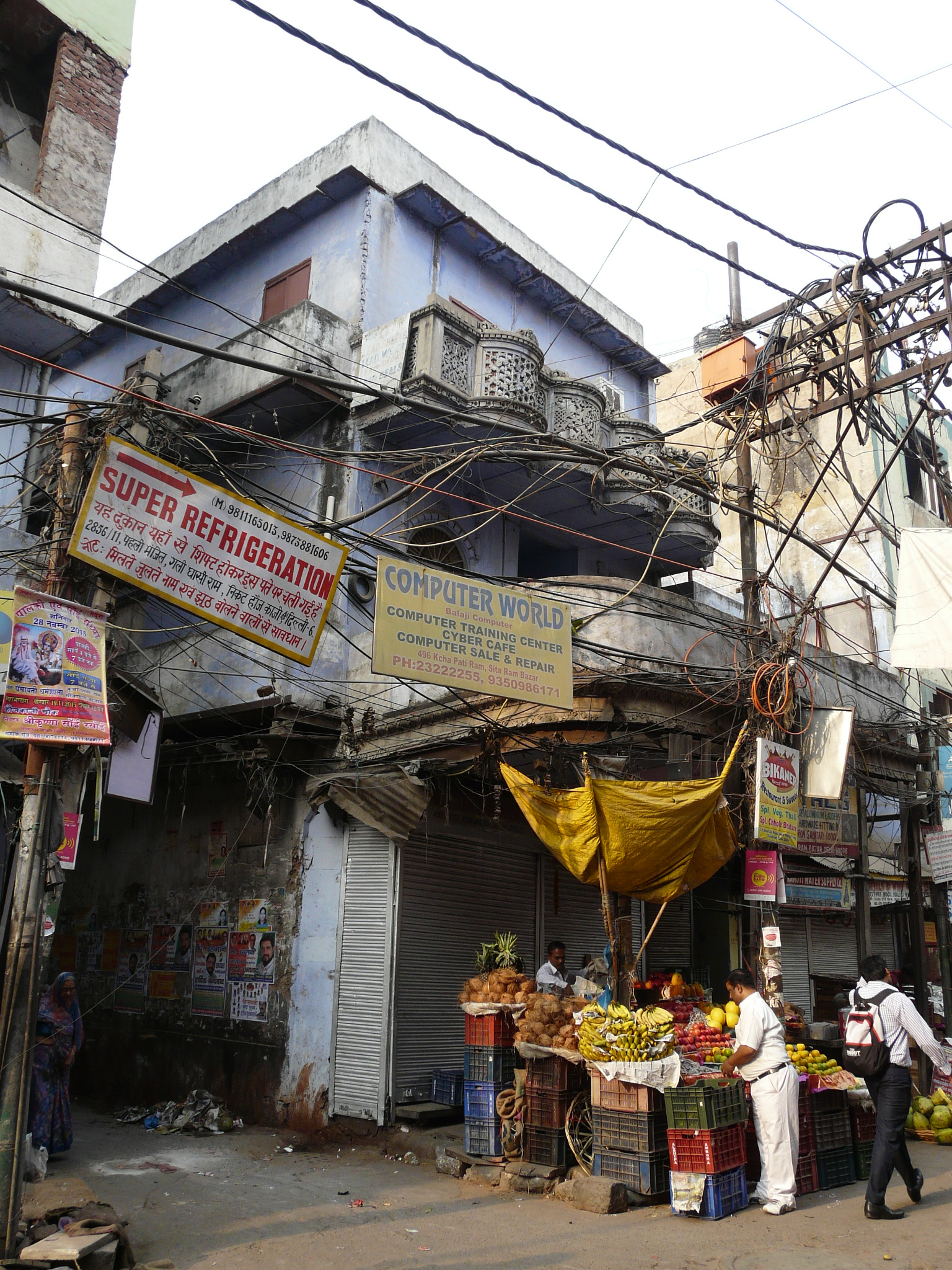
- Interactive map of Sitaram Bazar
- State: Delhi
- District: Central Delhi
- Time zone: UTC+5:30 (IST)
- PIN: 110006

Sitaram Bazar (Hindi: सीताराम बाज़ार, also spelled Sita Ram Bazar) is a historic sublocality in Old Delhi, located within the Chandni Chowk area of Central Delhi, India. Part of the Shahjahanabad region established during the Mughal era, it is renowned for its centuries-old havelis, wholesale markets, and street food culture. Nearby landmarks include the Red Fort and Jama Masjid.

== History ==
Sitaram Bazar traces its origins to the 17th century, when Emperor Shah Jahan founded Shahjahanabad as the capital of the Mughal Empire.

Its historical significance was captured in the 1993 short film Bazaar Sitaram, directed by Neena Gupta, which portrayed a year in the community's life, highlighting its social and cultural dynamics. The Shahjahanabad Redevelopment Corporation is currently working to preserve the area's heritage while improving infrastructure, recognising its historical value.

== Geography ==
Situated in the Kotwali ward of Central Delhi, Sitaram Bazar is bordered by sublocalities such as Chawri Bazar, Ballimaran, and Daryaganj. Its geographic coordinates are approximately 28.64757°N, 77.22746°E.

The area is accessible via the Chandni Chowk Metro Station on the Yellow Line, approximately 1 km away, and the New Delhi Railway Station. Nearby landmarks include the Red Fort, Jama Masjid, and the markets of Chandni Chowk.

== In popular culture ==
The 1993 short film Bazaar Sitaram, directed by Neena Gupta, depicted the sublocality's daily life, markets, and community spirit, cementing its cultural significance. The film remains a notable representation of Sitaram Bazar's heritage in Indian cinema.
