= Dariba Kalan =

- Neighborhood of Delhi
- Location in Central Delhi, India
- Coordinates: 28.6553°N 77.2342°E
- Country: India
- Territory: Delhi (National Capital Region)
- Region: North India
- Town: Delhi

Languages
  - Official: Hindi
- Time zone: UTC+5:30 (IST)
- PIN: 110054

Dariba Kalan (Hindi: दरीबा कलान, English: Street of the Incomparable Pearl) is a historic 17th-century street located in the Chandni Chowk area of Old Delhi (established as Shahjahanbad during the reign of the Mughal Empire). It lies within the walled city of Delhi, and connects the Chandni Chowk area with Jama Masjid. The words Khurd and Kalan, "small" and "big" in Persian, respectively, are used to distinguish two settlements that have the same name based on their relative sizes.

== History ==
The street derives its name from the Persian term Dur-e be-baha, which translates as "unparalleled pearl", whereas the suffix Kalan means big. There was also a smaller street in the vicinity, known as Dariba Khurd or Chhota Dariba; both Khurd and Chhota mean "small"; it is now known as Kinari Bazaar. This is in reference to its history as a popular bazaar for precious stones, gold, and silver jewelry, especially under the reign of the 17th-century Mughal emperor Shah Jahan. The street witnessed the bloody massacre of Delhi in March 1739, ordered by the Persian invader Nadir Shah, when hundreds of innocent civilians and soldiers were killed and the gold shops were pillaged and looted.

== Overview ==
Today, the vast majority of the shops in Dariba Kalan trade in costume jewellery. Some also deal in authentic attar, a special variety of fragrance derived from botanical sources. These stores claim to date back to the early 19th century. Also proximate to Dariba Kalan are Kinari Bazaar, Gali Kazanchi, and Gali Paranthe Wali, whereas located at both ends of the street are renowned outlets retailing jalebi, a sticky yet sweet confectionary delight.

== In popular culture ==
Dariba Kalan is mentioned in the popular song Kajra Re from the hit Hindi film Bunty aur Babli (2005).

== See also ==
- Nadir Shah
- Jainism in Delhi
