= Chawri Bazar =

- Neighborhood of Delhi
- Location in Delhi, India
- Coordinates: 28.650402°N 77.229379°E
- Country: India
- State: Delhi
- District: Central Delhi

Languages
  - Official: Hindi
- Time zone: UTC+5:30 (IST)
- PIN: 110 006
- Planning agency: MCD

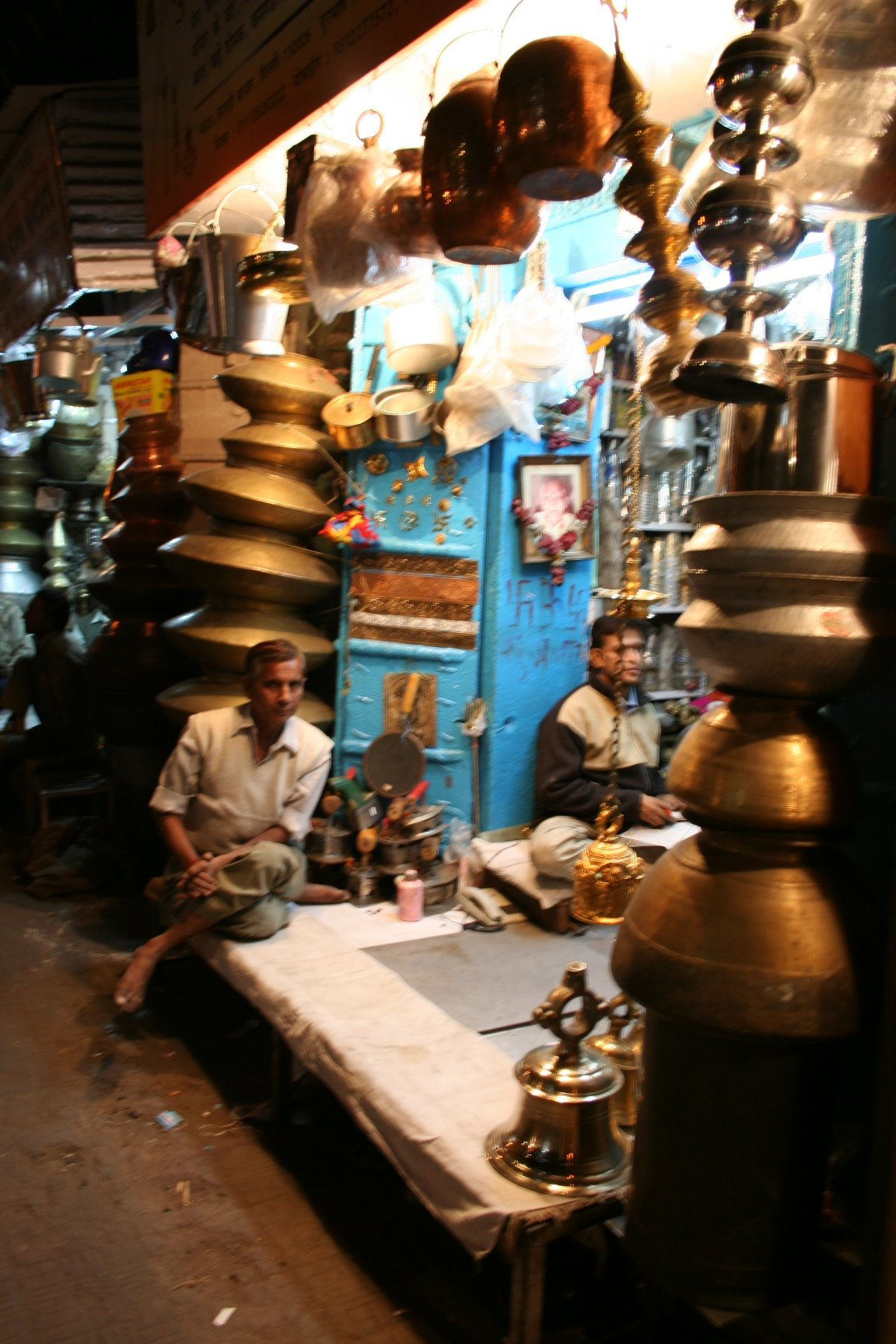
Brass shop in Chawri Bazar, Dec 2006.

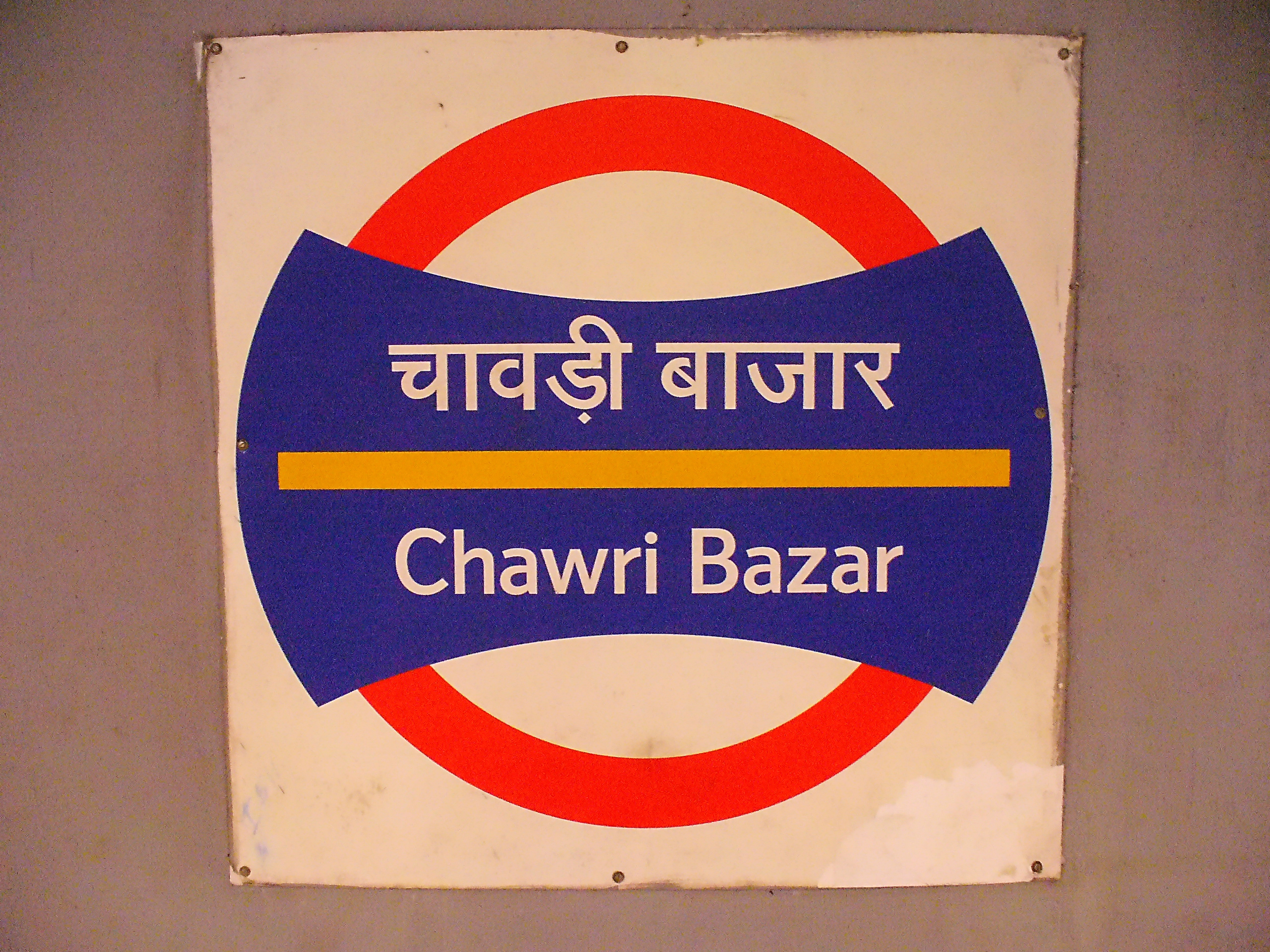
Chawri Bazar Metro Station

Chawri Bazar is a specialized wholesale market of brass, copper and paper products. Established in 1840, with a hardware market, it was the first wholesale market of Old Delhi it lies to the west of Jama Masjid in Delhi.

It can be reached by taking the street just near the middle projection of Jama Masjid's western (rear) wall. It was accessible via the Chawri Bazar underground station of the Delhi Metro.

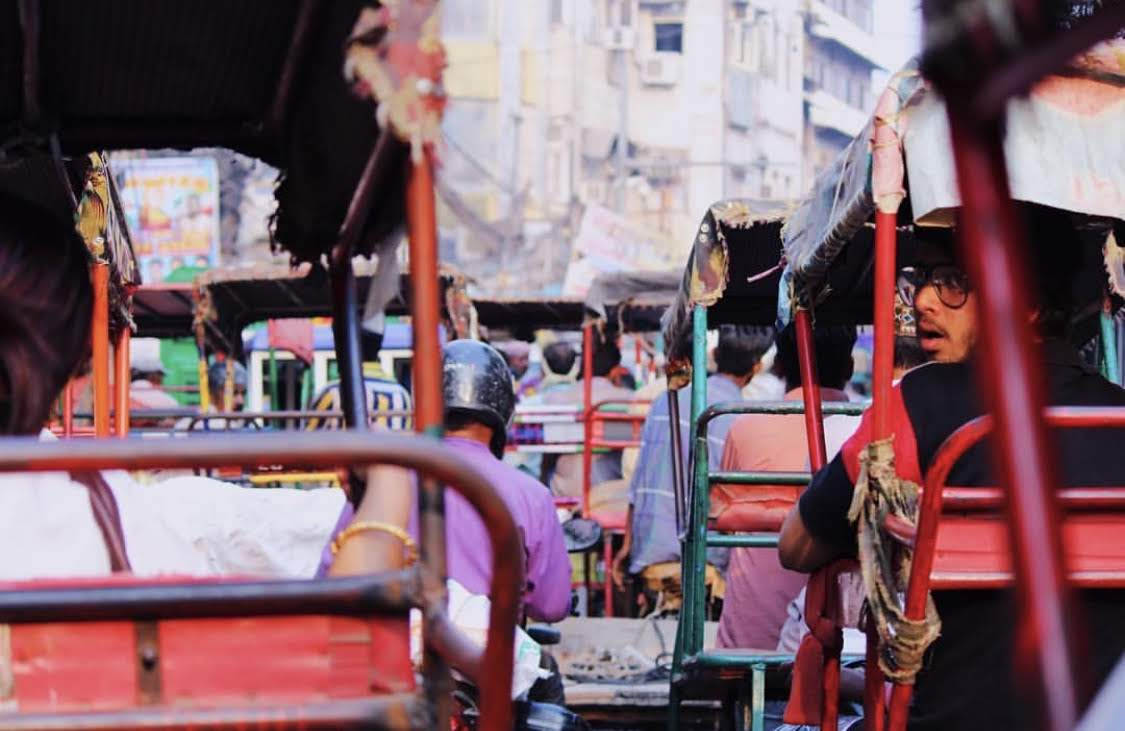
A rickshaw jam in Chawri Bazaar

== History ==
Once popularly known for its dancing girls and courtesans in the 19th century, frequented by nobility and rich alike. After the advent of the British as the tawaif culture faded out, subsequently, prostitutes came to occupy the upper floors of the market. This eventually led to the area becoming a hub of criminality and thus the Delhi Municipal Committee evicted them from the area altogether, the street is named after a Marathi word chawri, which means meeting place. The street got this name mainly because here a 'sabha' or meeting would take place in front of a Maratha noble's house and he would try settling the disputes before it would reach the emperor. A second reason is probably that a gathering used to get organized when a respected dancer performed and showed the finer nuances of her skill. The whole ambience of the street, however, got changed after the 1857 war when the British destroyed many huge mansions of the Maratha nobles. Built of Lakhori bricks, a small canon is placed over the gateways of both the buildings. The buildings have semi-octagonal projections on both sides with two small rooms on either side. The rooms have semi-circular arches to enter and it is difficult to visualize its former shape. The main features of the buildings are its niches and arches at the roof-level on the semi-octagonal projections, though difficult to make out.

Today, Chawri Bazaar is a high-traffic thoroughfare where laborers, vehicles, rickshaws, and pedestrians navigate the street during peak market hours. While primarily a wholesale market, retail purchases of brass and copper religious idols, such as those of Lord Vishnu and Buddha, are permitted alongside items like jewelry boxes, vases, pots, and oil lamps. Presently, the market is predominantly known for wholesale paper products, offering items ranging from wedding cards and wallpaper to greeting cards and specialized paper types..

Chawri Bazar is a road which has Jama Masjid on one end and Hauz Quazi on the other end. Now, there is a metro station at Hauz Quazi by the name of Chawri Bazar. Nai Sarak, which is famous for Books and Ladies' Garments, joins it at Bad-shah Bulla. Besides Nai Sarak, there is another way through Ballimaran which connects Chawri bazar to Chandni Chowk.
