= Shahjahanabad =

Old Delhi
- Historic core
- Shahjahanabad
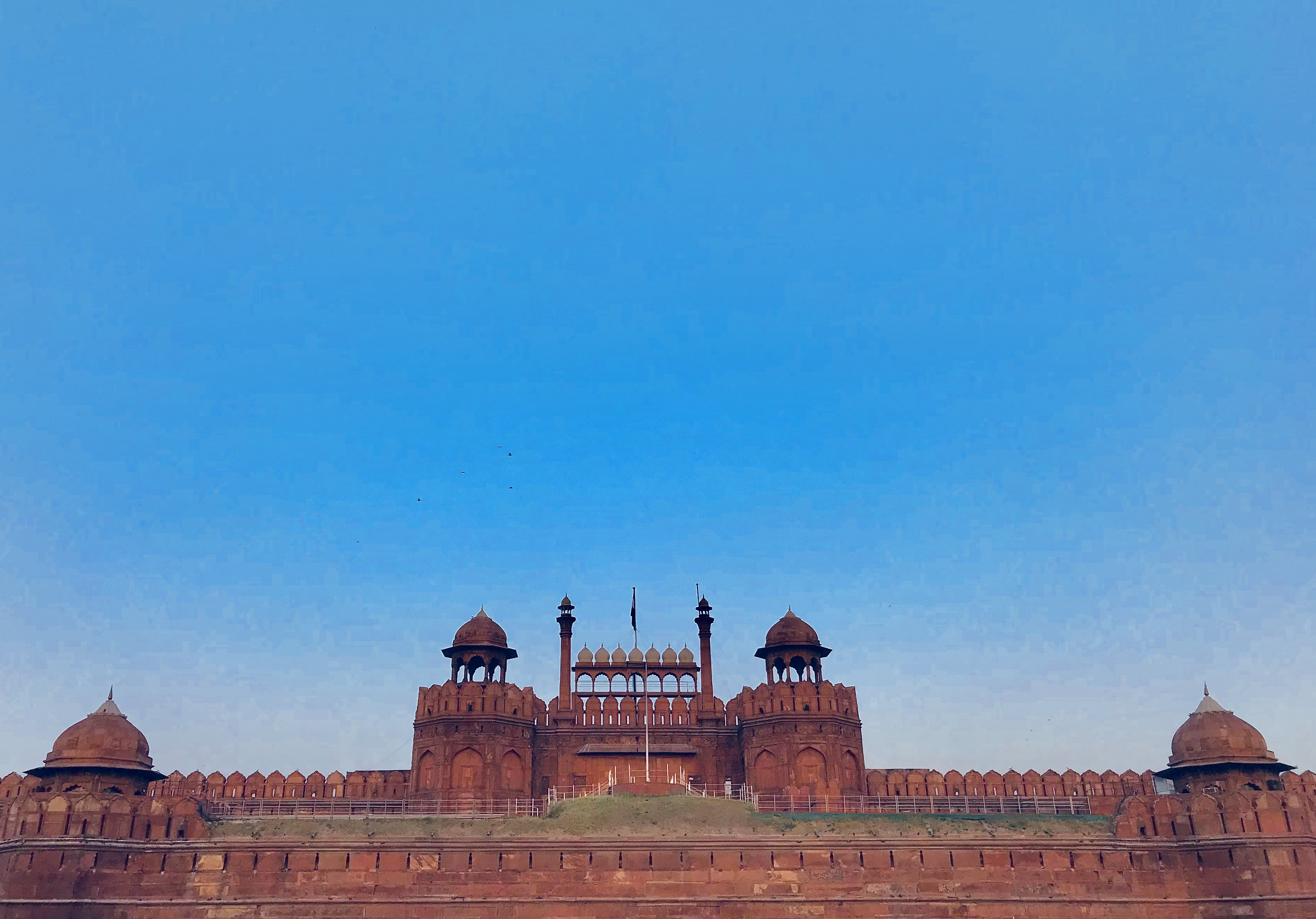
- Red Fort viewed from a distance close to the Chandni Chowk

- Location within Delhi Location within India
- Coordinates: 28°39′39″N 77°13′48″E
- Country: India
- Union Territory: Delhi
- District: Central Delhi
- Founder: Shah Jahan
- Named for: Shah Jahan

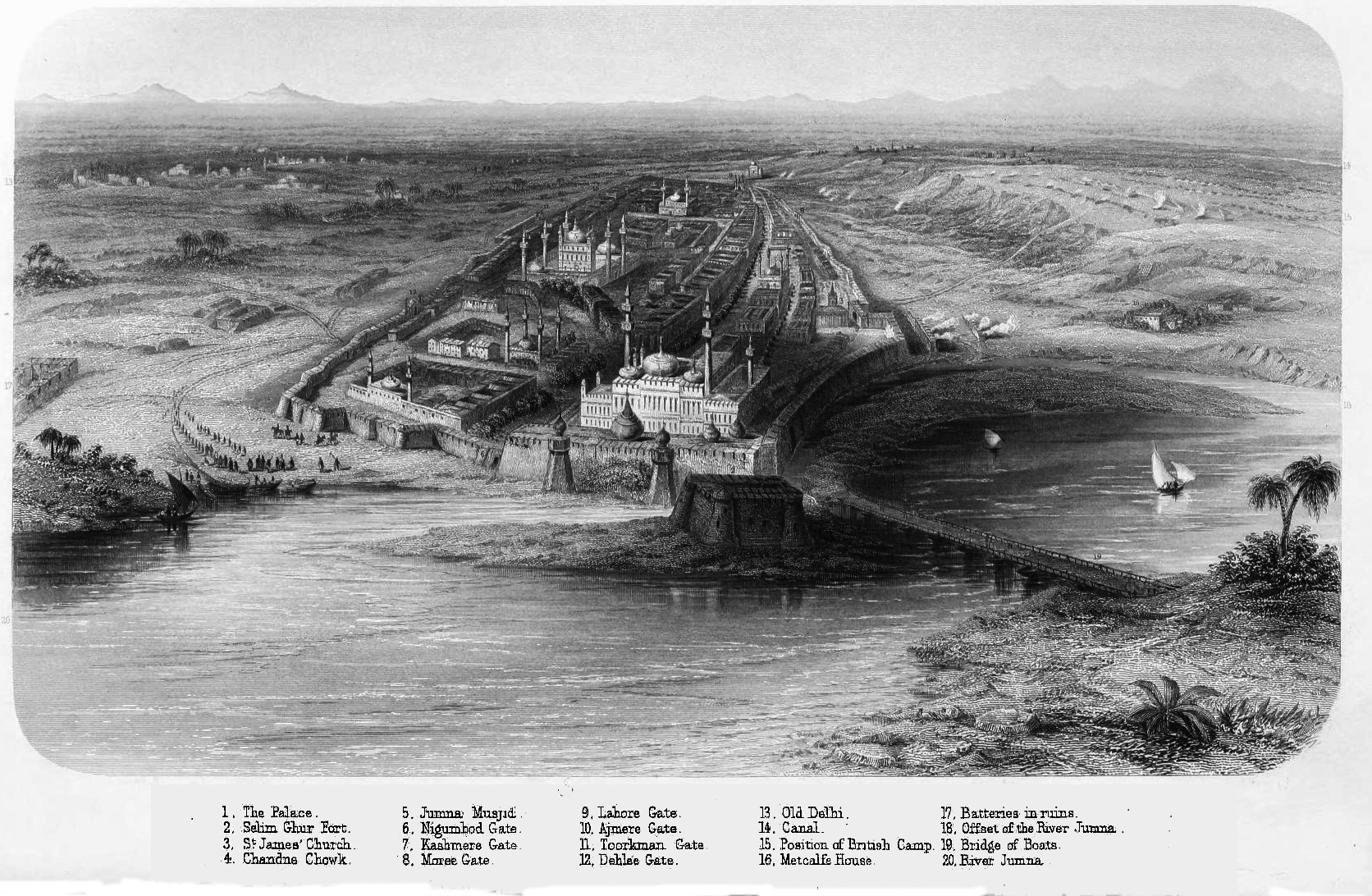
Old Delhi, Yamuna river bank

Shahjahanabad, colloquially known as Old Delhi (Hindustani: Purāni Dillī), is a place in the Central Delhi district of Delhi, India. It was founded as a Walled City and officially named Shahjahanabad in 1648, upon Shah Jahan's decision to shift the imperial Mughal capital from Agra. The construction of the fortified city was completed in 1648, and it remained the capital of Mughal India until its fall in 1857, when the British Empire (whose Indian capital was at Calcutta) took over as paramount power in the Indian subcontinent. After the inauguration of New Delhi as the capital of India, the locality started to be colloquially known as Old Delhi in order to distinguish it from the capital city, or the rest of the NCT Region or National Capital Region.

Old Delhi, or Shahjahanabad, rose as the capital of the Mughals for most of the empire's history, right from the rise and decline and demise of the empire. The major landmark monuments built during the Mughal era are the Red Fort, now a UNESCO World Heritage Site, the Jama Masjid, and the Sri Digambar Jain Lal Mandir. After the start of British colonialism, the St. James' Church and the Lawrence Institute of Educational and Cultural Affairs, later known as Delhi Town Hall were built in the 19th century. Today it serves as the symbolic heart of metropolitan Delhi and is renowned for its bustling bazaars, restaurants, street food, shopping locations, and its Mughal Indo-Persian and mixed native architecture with some touch of British influence. Only a few havelis are left and maintained.

Upon the 2012 trifurcation of the Municipal Corporation of Delhi, Shahjahanabad was administered by the North Delhi Municipal Corporation,; however, in May 2022, Shahjahanabad was placed in the ambit of the reunified Municipal Corporation of Delhi. The Shahjahanabad Redevelopment Corporation (SRDC) is the primary state agency responsible for the rejuvenation, conservation, development, and redevelopment of Shahjahanabad.

== History ==
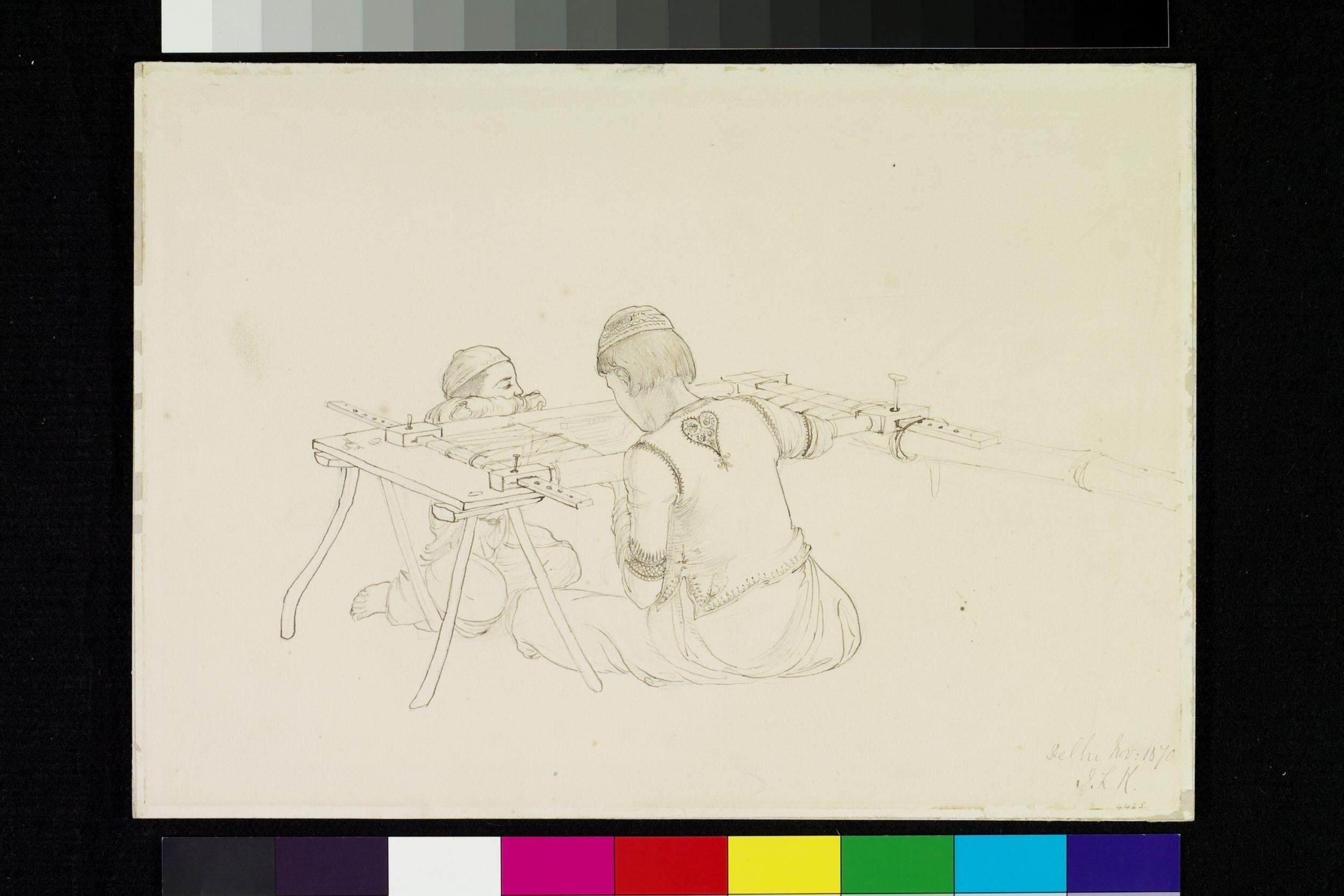
Two boys seated whilst embroidering on either side of an embroidery frame, Delhi, 1870

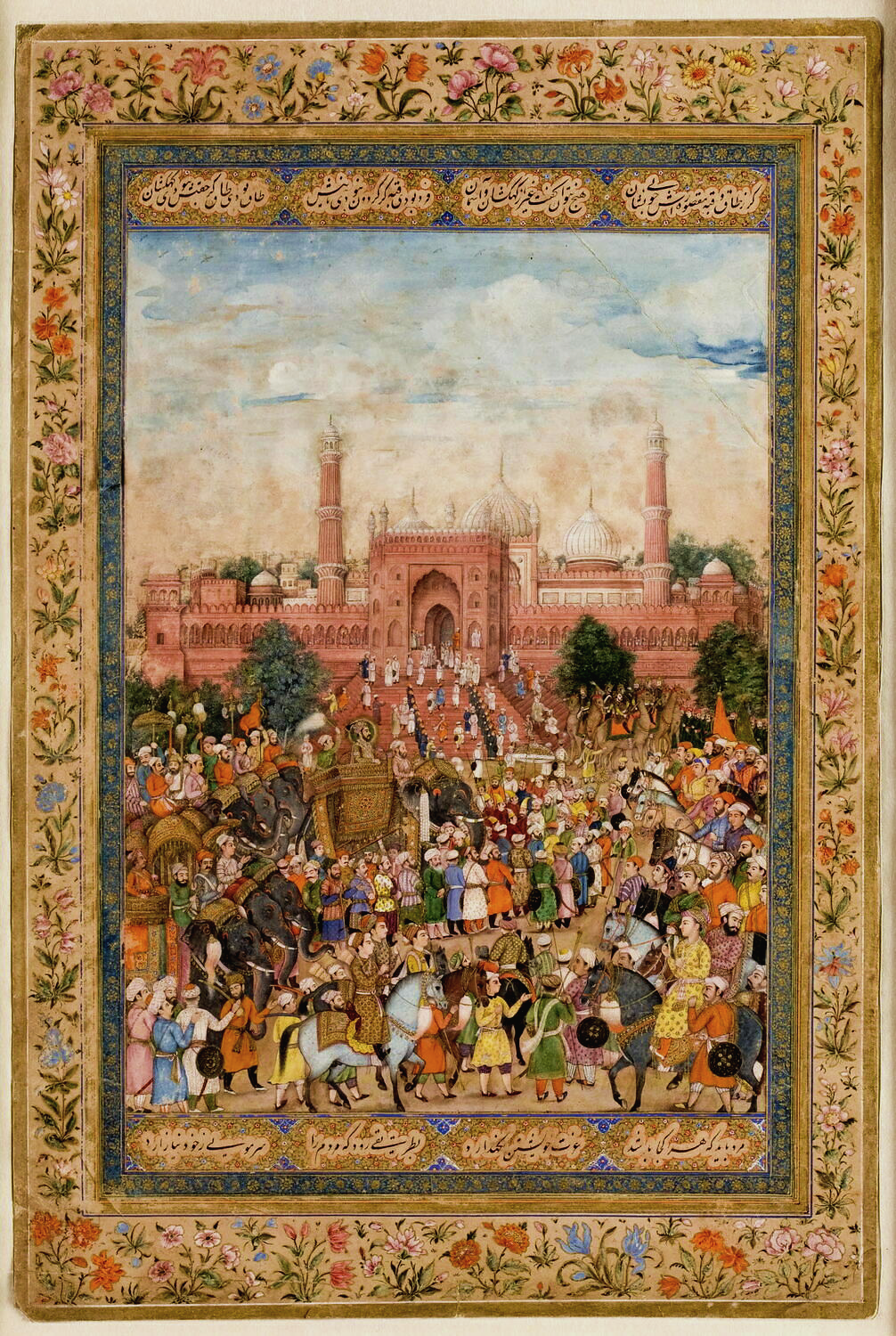
Arrival of an imperial procession of the emperor Farrukh Siyar - at Delhi's "world-revealing" mosque of congregation on a Friday, to hear the sermon (khutba) recited in his name

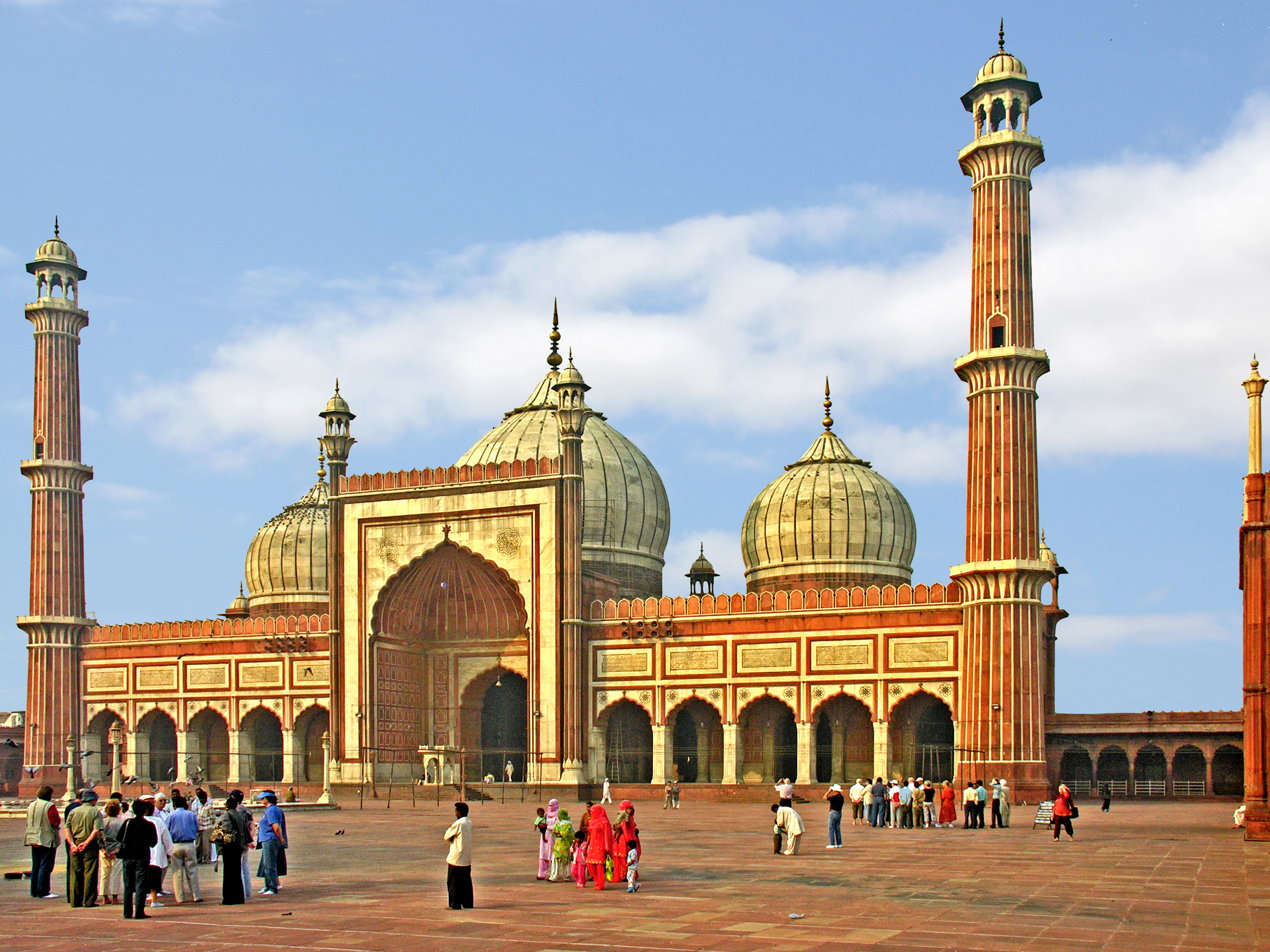
Jama Masjid built by Shah Jahan, 1656.

=== Delhi Sultanate era and beginning of the Mughal era ===
The site of Shahjahanabad is north of earlier settlements of Delhi. Its southern part overlaps with some of the area that was previously settled by the Tughlaqs in the 14th century when it was the seat of the Delhi Sultanate. The sultanates ruled from Delhi between 1206 and 1526, when the last was replaced by the Mughal dynasty. The five dynasties were the Mamluk dynasty (1206–90), the Khalji dynasty (1290–1320), the Tughlaq dynasty (1320–1414), the Sayyid dynasty (1414–51) and Lodi dynasty (1451–1526). For a period from 1538/1540 until 1555, the Mughals lost control over their empire under Humayun, and the Sur dynasty ruled swathes of India until the Mughals retook control of India, lastly defeating them and finally establishing firm control and stability over their empire.

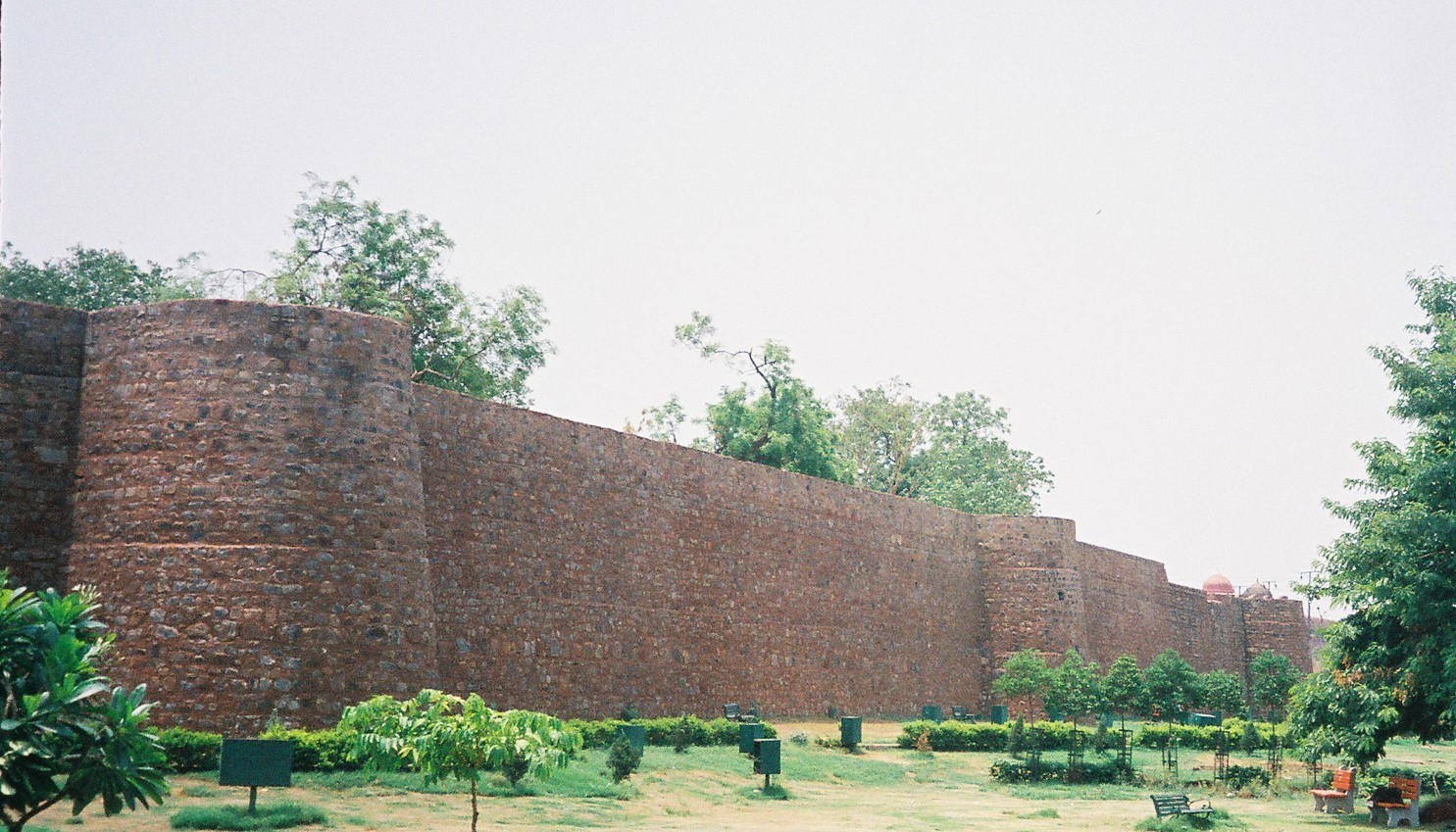
A view of the Salimgarh Fort

=== Mughal era ===
Delhi remained an important place for the Mughals, who built palaces and forts. Most importantly, Shah Jahan ordered his famous chief architect Ustad Ahmad Lahori to build the walled city between 1638 and 1649, containing the Lal Qila and the Chandni Chowk. Delhi was one of the original twelve subahs (imperial Mughal provinces), renamed Shahjahanabad in 1648, bordering Awadh, Agra, Ajmer, Multan and Lahore subahs. Daryaganj had the original cantonment of Delhi, after 1803, where a native regiment of Delhi garrison was stationed, which was later shifted to the Ridge area. East of Daryaganj was Raj Ghat gate of the walled city, opening at Raj Ghat on the Yamuna River. The inaugural wholesale market of Old Delhi opened as the hardware market in Chawri Bazaar in 1840, the succeeding wholesale market was that of dry fruits, spices and herbs at Khari Baoli, opening in 1850. The Phool Mandi (Flower Market) of Daryaganj was established in 1869, and, to this day, despite serving a small geographical area, it is of great importance due to a dense population.

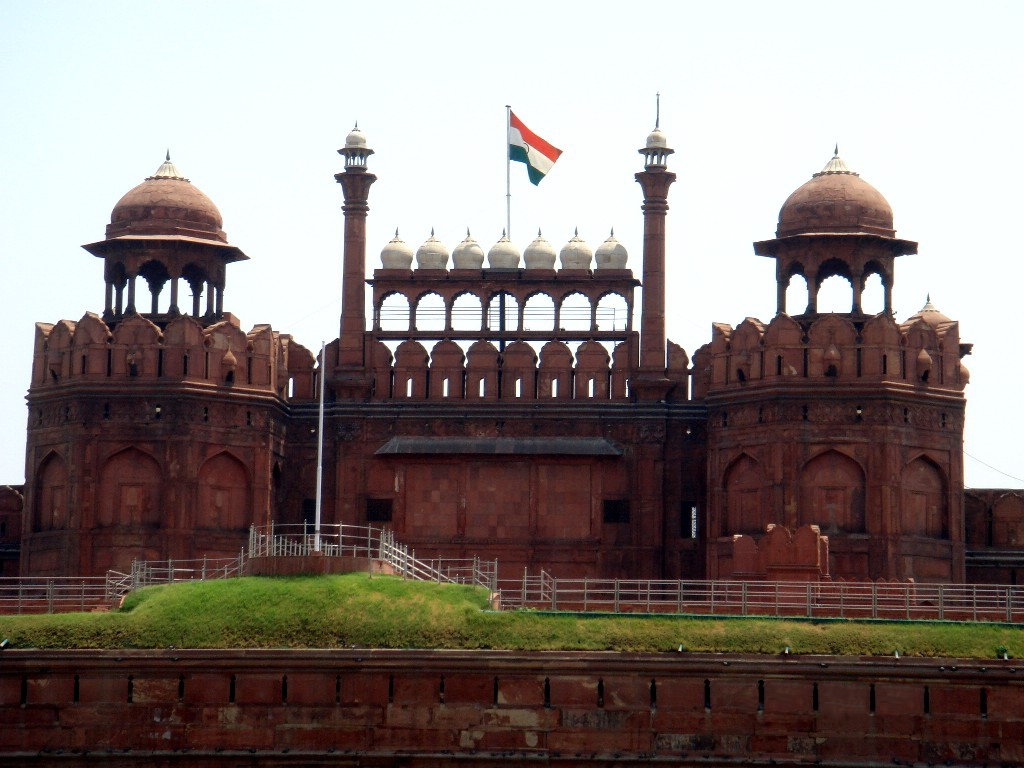
The Lahori Gate of Red Fort from Chandni Chowk.

=== Colonial era ===
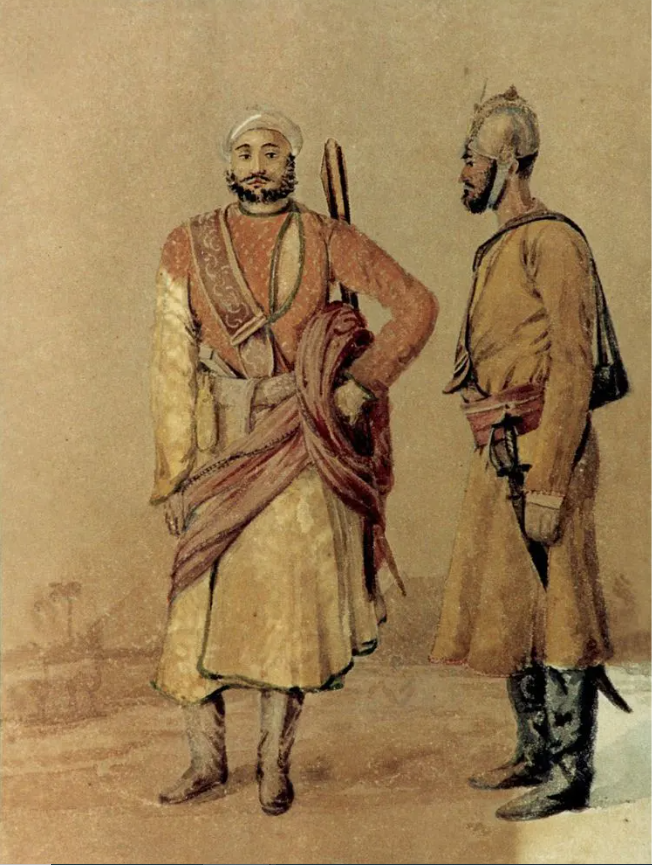
Police in Delhi under Bahadur Shah II, 1842.

After the fall of the Mughal Empire post 1857 revolt, the British Raj shifted the capital of British controlled territories in India to a less volatile city, Calcutta in Bengal, where it remained until 1911. After the announcement of the change, the British developed Lutyens' Delhi (in modern New Delhi) just south-west of Shahjahanabad. At this point, the older city started being called Old Delhi, as New Delhi became the seat of a national government. It was formally inaugurated as such in 1931.

==== 1876 description ====
In 1876, Carr Stephen described the city as follows:

Of the two streets described by Bernier, the longer extended from the Lahore Gate of the city to the Lahore Gate of the citadel, and the other from the Delhi Gate of the city to the Lahore Gate of the fort. Both these streets were divided into several sections, each of which was known by a different name. The section between the Lahore Gate of the fort and the entrance of the street called the Dariba, known as the Khání Darwázah, was called the Urdi or the Military Bazaar; owing, very probably, to the circumstance of a portion of the local garrison having been once quartered about the place. Between the Khúní Darwázah and the present Kotwálí, or the Head Police Station of the city, the street has the name of Phúl ká Mandí or the flower market. The houses in front of the Kotwálí were built, at a short distance from the line of the rest of the houses in the street, to form a square. Between the Kotwálí and the gate known as the Taráiah, was the Jowhri or the Jewellers' Bazaar; between the Taráiah and the neighborhood known as Asharfí ká Katrá, was, par excellence, the Chándní Chauk. There was a tank in the center of the Chauk the site of which is now occupied by the Municipal Clock Tower, and beyond this to the Fatehpúrí Masjid was the Fatehpúrí Bazaar. The houses around Chándní Chauk were of the same height, and were ornamented with arched doors and painted verandahs. To the north and south of the square there were two gate-ways, the former leading to the Sarái of Jahánárá Begam, and the latter to one of the most thickly populated quarters of the city. Round the tank the ground was covered with vegetable, fruit and sweetmeat stalls. In the course of time the whole of this long street came to be known as the Chandni Chauk. This grand street was laid out by Jahánárá Begam, daughter of Sháh Jahán, in the year 1600 A. D., and several ears later she built a garden and sarái on it. From the Lahore Gate of the fort to the end of the Chandni Chauk the street was about 40 yards [37 m] wide and 1,520 yards [1,390 m] long. Through the centre of this street ran the canal of 'Alí Mardán, shaded on both sides by trees. On the eastern end of the Chándni Chauk stands the Lahore Gate of the Fort, and on the opposite end the handsome mosque of Fatehpúrí Begam.

The clock tower no longer exists, although the location is still called Ghantaghar. The sarai of Jahanara Begum has been replaced by the city town hall. The kotwal is now adjacent to Gurdwara Sis Ganj Sahib.

The Old Delhi Railway Station, was designed in the architectural style of the nearby Red Fort, which was constructed during the administration of the British colonial government and opened in 1903.

The British also built the State Bank of India branch building in Chandni Chowk as well as the St. James' Church, the St. Stephen's Church and Old St. Stephen's College now one of the important offices of the Election Commission of India of Delhi near Kashmere Gate, leaving an influence of European architecture and Indo-Saracenic architecture as well in the historical place.

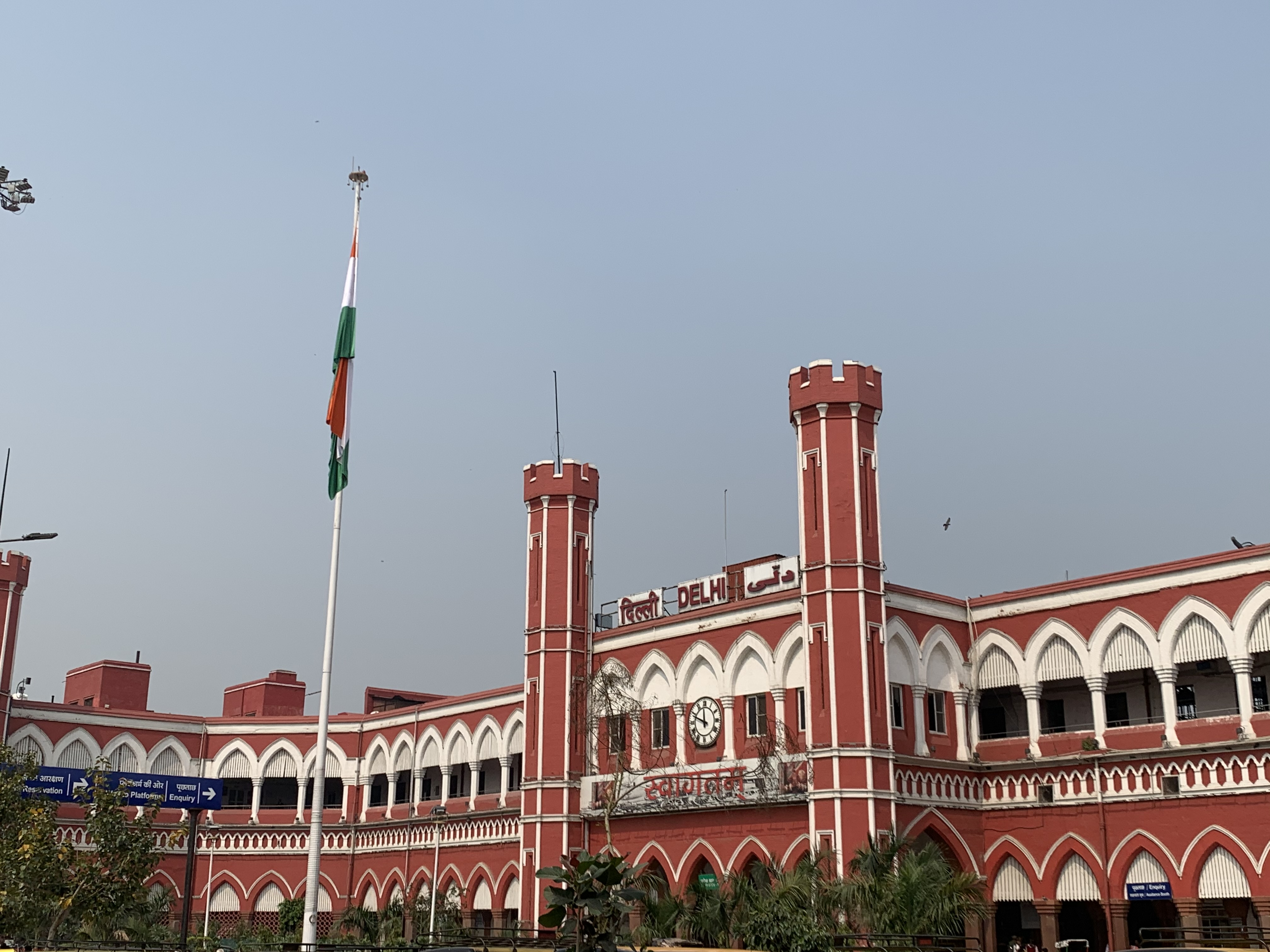
Old Delhi Railway Station built 1903

== Demographics ==
The population of Old Delhi remains a mix of many different ethnic groups. Hindi–Urdu (Hindustani) is the most spoken language.

== Walls and gates ==
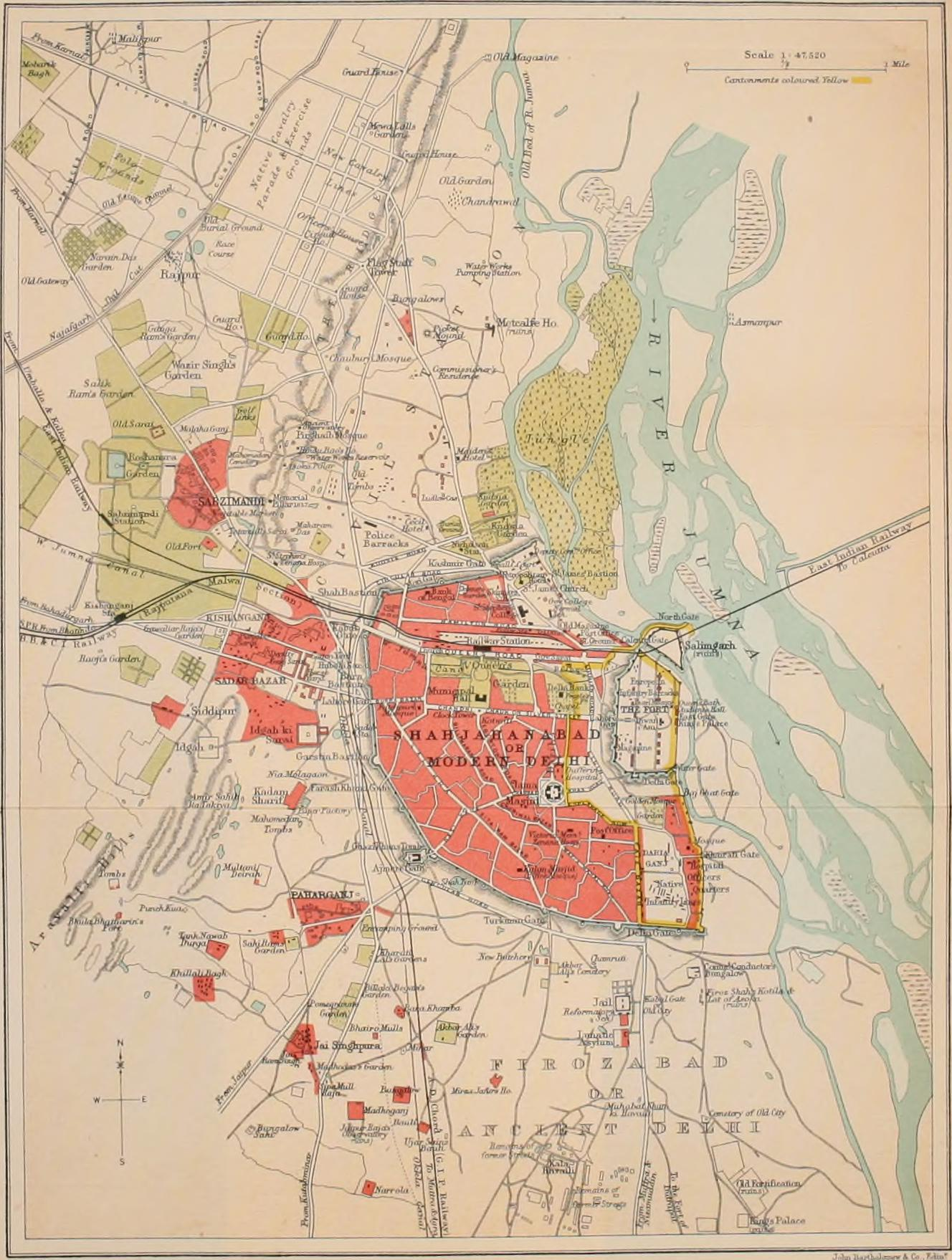
"Shahjahanabad or Modern Delhi", in 1911 map

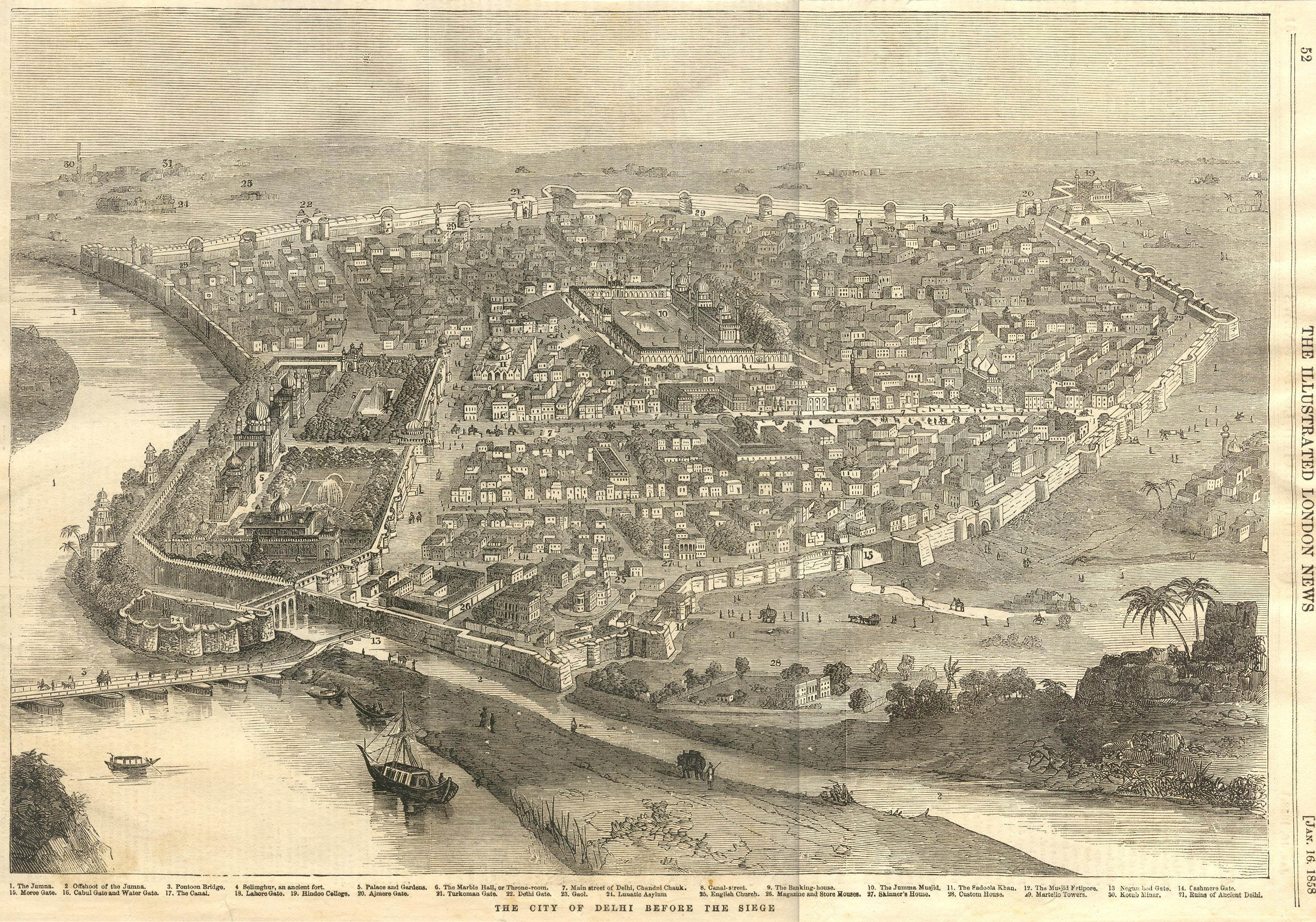
The City of Delhi Before the Siege - The Illustrated London News, January 16, 1858

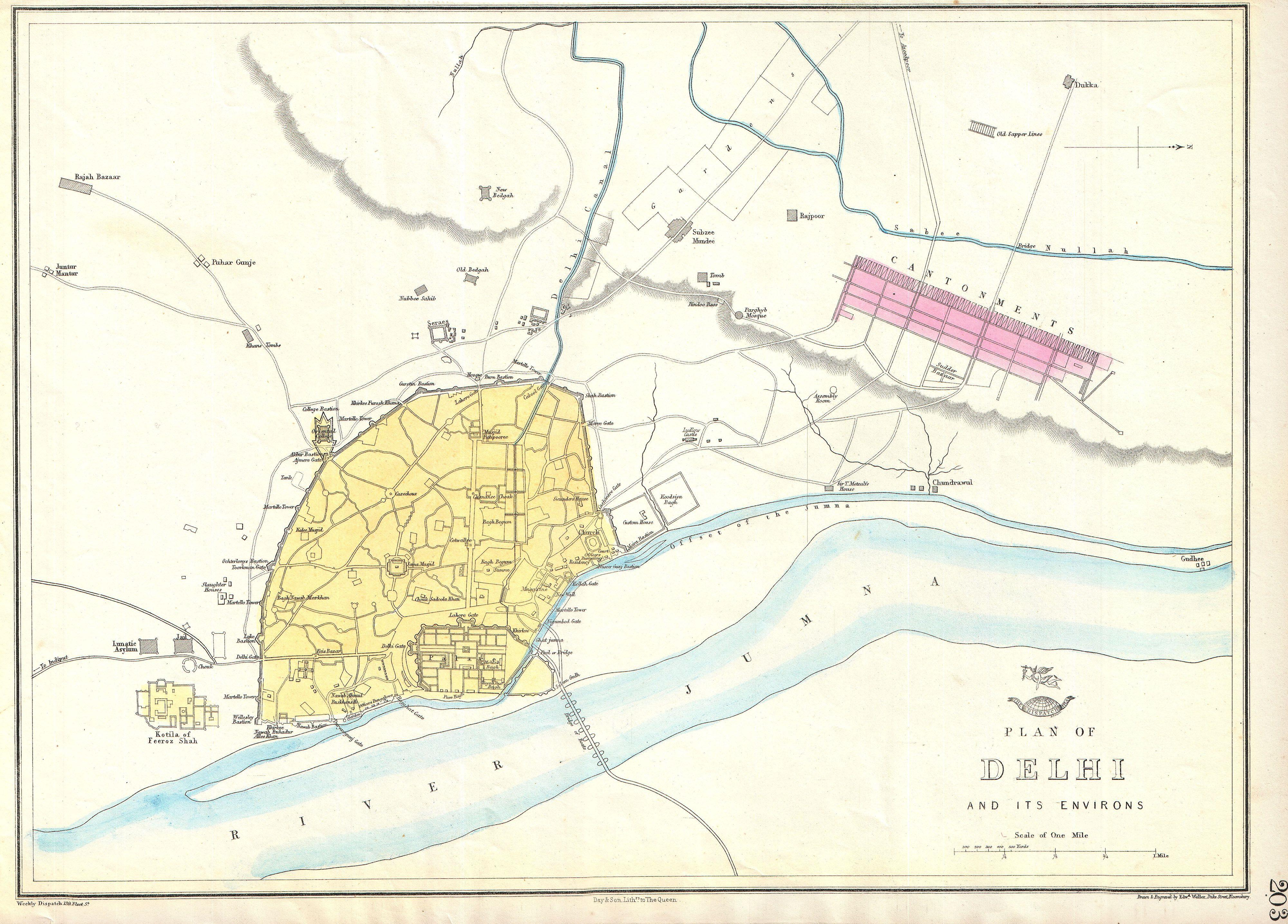
Historic map of Delhi (Shahjahanabad), 1863

It is approximately shaped like a quarter cìrcle, with the Red Fort as the focal point. The old city was surrounded by a wall enclosing about 1,500 acres (6.1 km^{2}), with 14 gates:

1. Nigambodh Gate: northeast, leading to historic Nigambodh Ghat on the Yamuna River
2. Kashmiri Gate: north
3. Mori Gate: north
4. Kabuli gate: west
5. Lahori gate: west close to the Sadar Railway station, Railway Colony, including the tomb of Syed Abdul Rehman Jilani Dehlvi.
6. Ajmeri Gate: southwest, leading to Ghaziuddin Khan's Madrassa and Connaught Place, a focal point in New Delhi.
7. Turkman Gate: southwest, close to some pre-Shahjahan remains which got enclosed within the walls, including the tomb of Shah Turkman Bayabani.
8. Delhi Gate: south leading to Feroz Shah Kotla and what was then older habitation of Delhi.

The surrounding walls, 12 feet (3.7 m) wide and 26 feet (7.9 m) tall, originally of mud, were replaced by red stone in 1657. In the Mughal period, the gates were kept locked at night. The walls have now mostly disappeared; only some of the gates are still present. The township of old Delhi is still identifiable in a satellite image because of the density of houses.

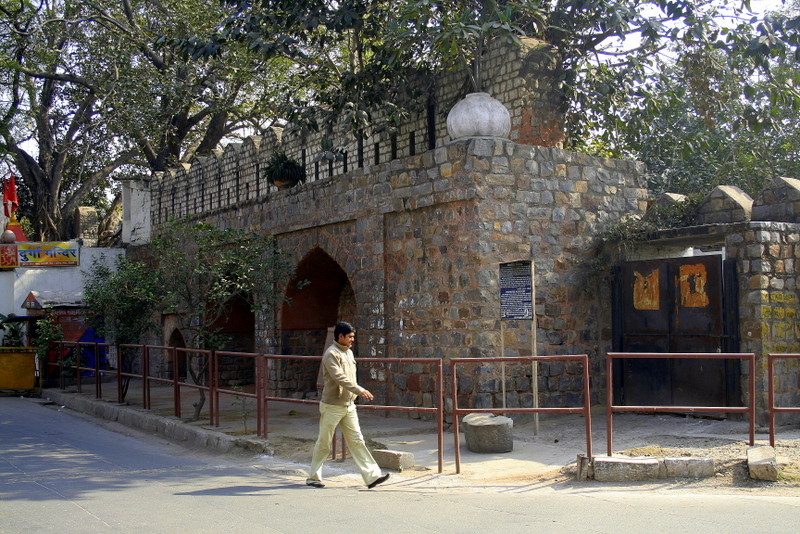
A portion of the city wall of the walled city of Shahjahanabad from Ansari Road in Daryaganj.

The Khooni Darwaza, south of Delhi Gate and just outside the walled city, was originally constructed by Sher Shah Suri.

The Bahadur Shahi Gate was the last gate built by the last Mughal emperor, Bahadur Shah Zafar, which connects the Salimgarh Fort to the Red Fort.

=== Streets and neighbourhoods ===
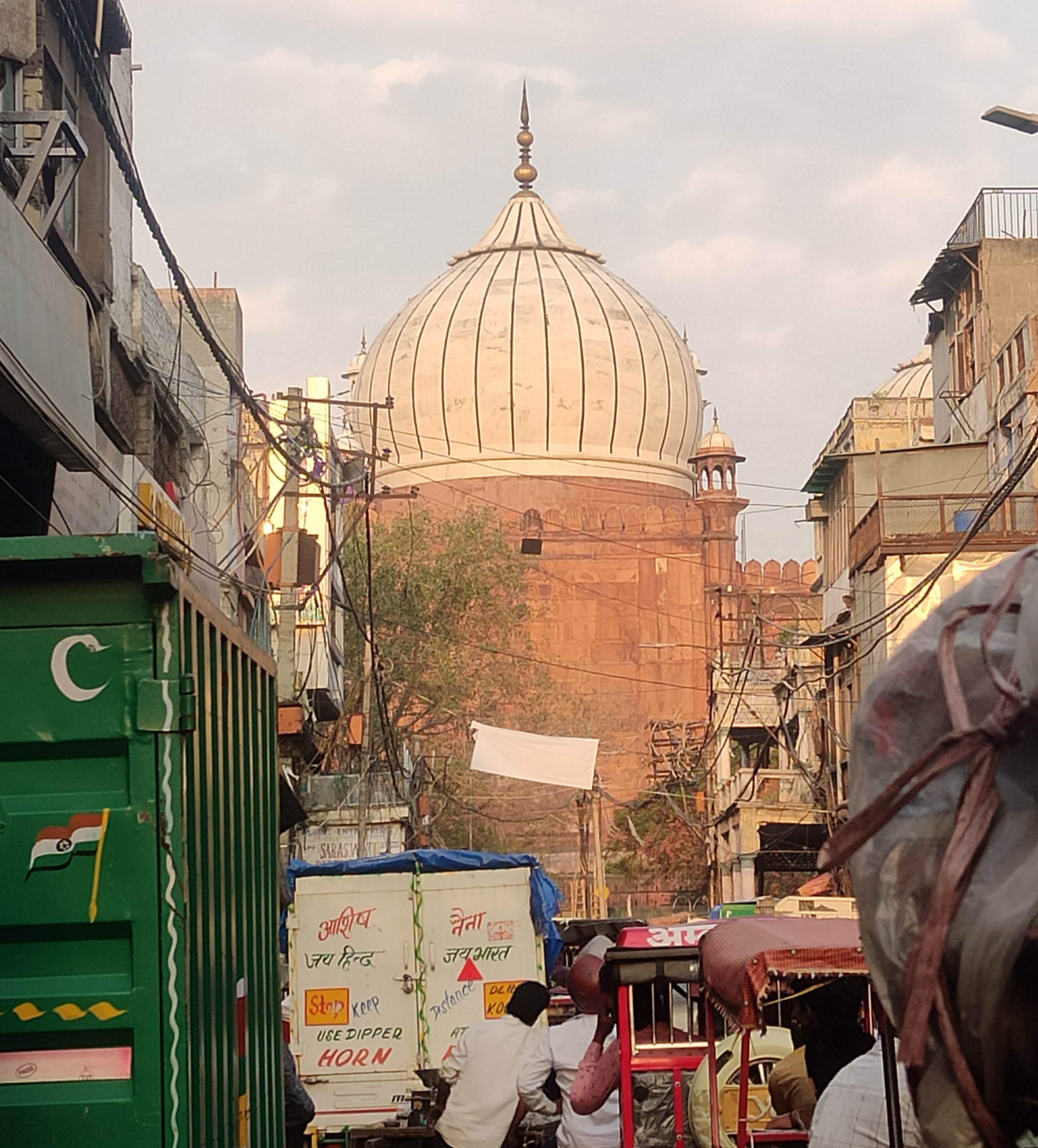
A glimpse of Jama Masjid can be seen while passing through Chawri Bazar.

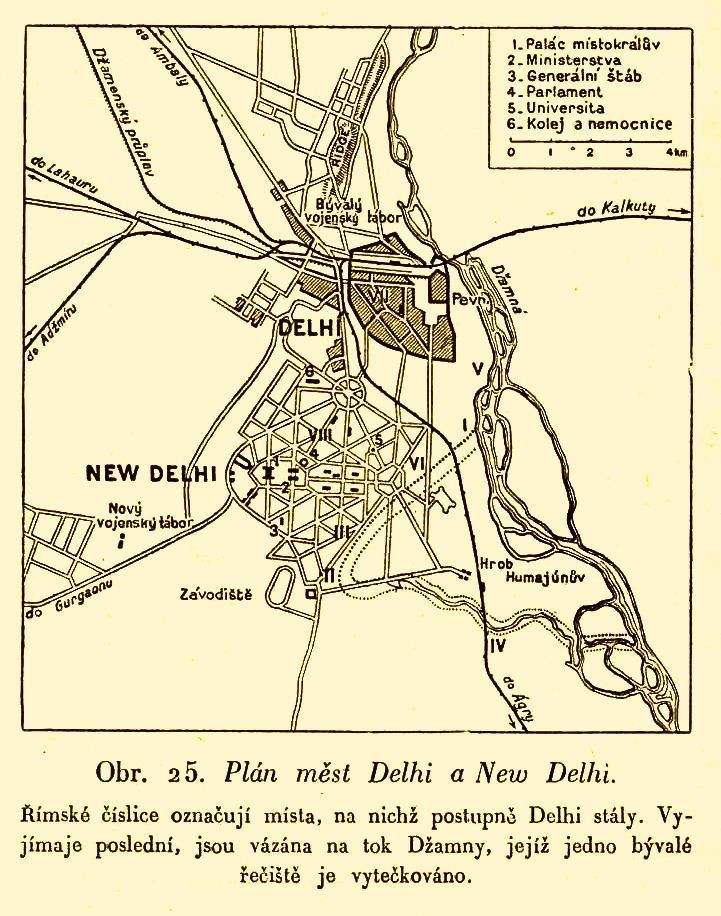
Map of Delhi and New Delhi after the First World War. The descriptions are in Czech.

The streets in Old Delhi are known for being narrow and winding and being labyrinthine within the walled city with many alleys, as well as for being vibrant and bustling and mainly crowded.

The streets retain the essence of the Mughal-era layout, serving as a functional network for moving from one place to another as well as for bustling markets and iconic landmarks, creating a unique living experience in the city. Historic shops, traditional mansions (havelis) and religious sites are built directly along and into these lanes, making the streets themselves a form of premises that houses and shapes community life.

The main street, now termed Chandni Chowk which meant Moonlight square, runs from the Red Fort to Fatehpuri Masjid. The street square today which includes the market which was historically divided by canals, engineered to reflect moonlight hence the name Moonlight square. These canals have since been removed, leaving behind a transformed urban landscape. The Chandni Chowk was a significant route for Mughal imperial processions, hosting the grand displays of emperors and their entourages, highlighting its importance in the empire's cultural and rich architectural heritage.

North of the street, there is the mansion of Begum Samru, now called Bhagirath Palace. South of the street is Dariba Kalan, a dense residential area, beyond which connects the Chandni Chowk area with the Jama Masjid. Daryaganj is a section that used to border the river at Rajghat and Zeenat-ul-Masjid.

The Urdu language emerged from the Urdu Bazaar, the open grounds between the Lahori Gate of the Red Fort and the Jama Masjid adjacent to the Chandni Chowk, which was called Urdu Bazaar, i.e., the encampment market in Old Delhi. The Din Dunia magazine and various other Urdu publications are the reason for this language staying alive.

Its main arteries are

- Netaji Subhash Marg / Bahadur Shah Zafar Marg leading to India Gate (north and south)
- Chandni Chowk/Khari Baoli Road (east and west)

Old Delhi is approximately bounded by these modern roads:

- Nicholson Road (north)
- Mahatma Gandhi Marg (east)
- Shraddhananda Marg (west)
- Jawaharlal Nehru Marg (south)

== In literature ==
The engraving accompanying Letitia Elizabeth Landon's poem, "The City of Delhi", appears to show the Jama Masjid with an elephant on the open ground before it. She associates the city's past glories with tales of enchantment, namely James Ridley's The Tales of the Genii (Sir Charles Mansell). In Fisher's Drawing Room Scrap Book, 1832, page 44.

== Historical sites ==
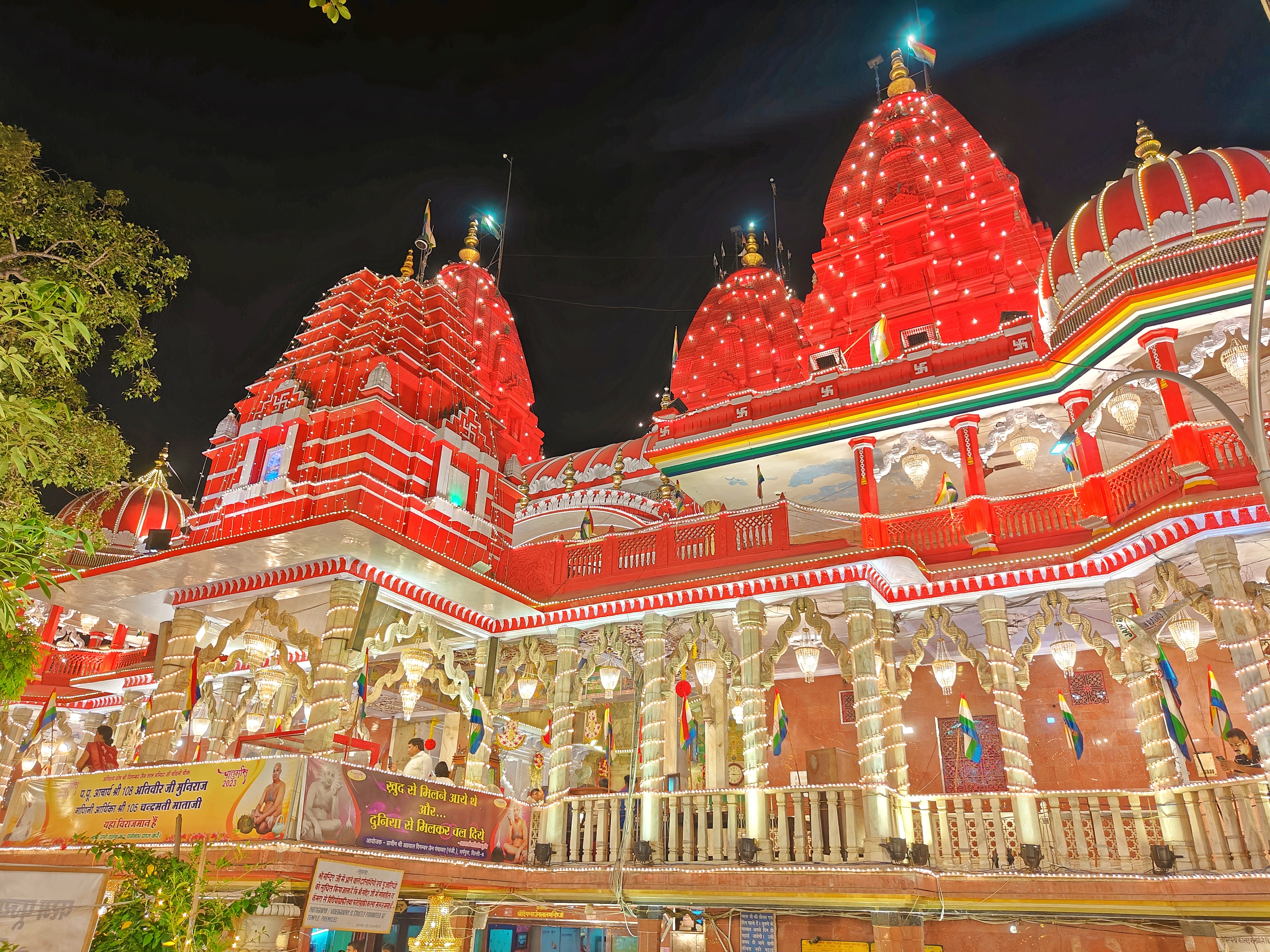
Lal Mandir, side view

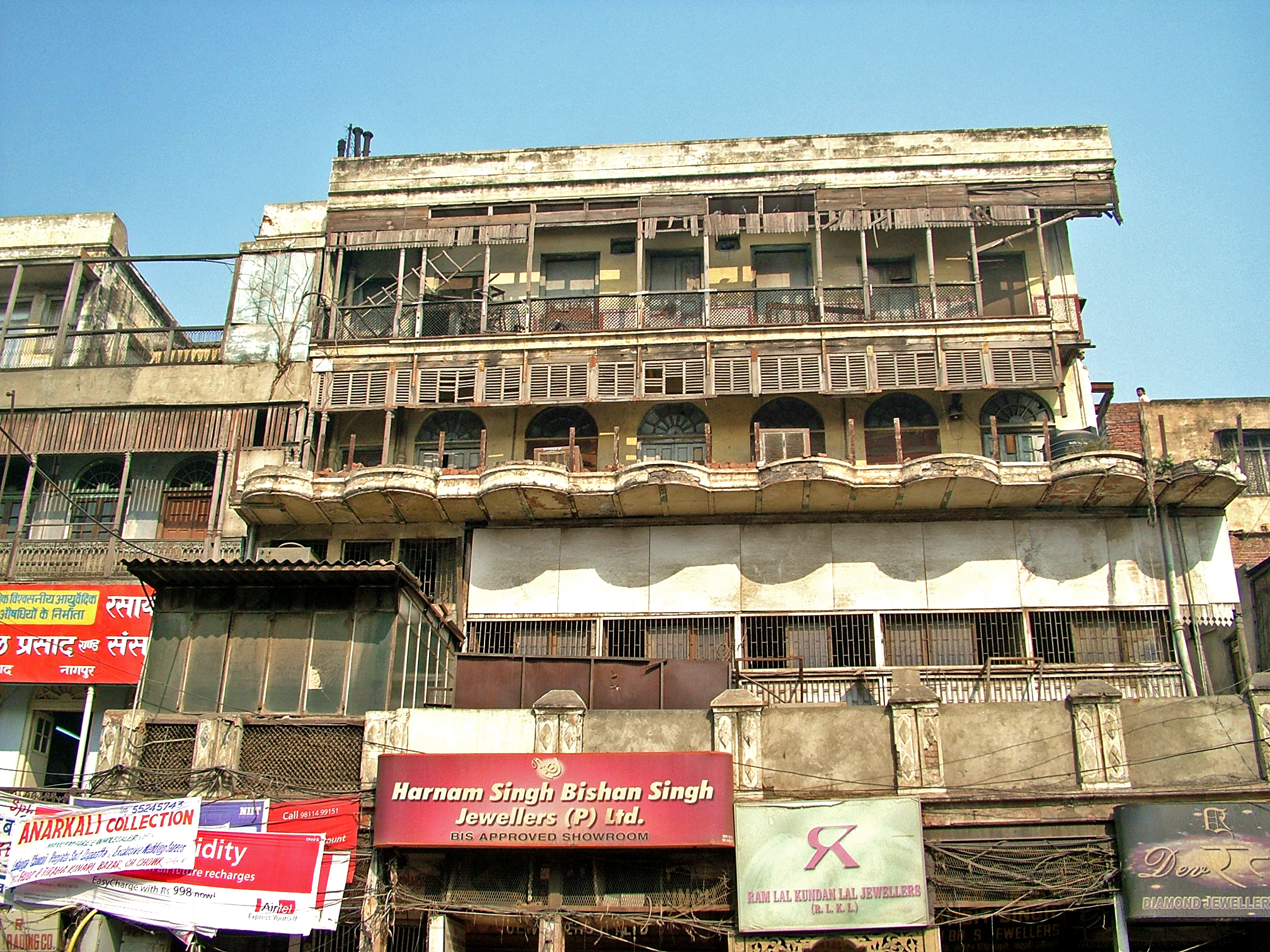
Old ancient Haveli's at the Chandni Chowk and shops below in 2005

Many of the historical attractions are in the Chandni Chowk area and the Red Fort. In addition, Old Delhi also has:

- Gurudwara Sis Ganj Sahib, a sikh Gurudwara built to commemorate the martyrdom site of the ninth Sikh Guru, Guru Tegh Bahadur. It marks the site where the ninth Sikh Guru was beheaded on the orders of the Mughal emperor Aurangzeb on 11 November 1675 for rebelling against the forceful conversion of people from other religions (Hindus, Sikhs, Jains) to Islam.
- Bhai Mati Das Museum, a sikh museum
- Gaurishankar Temple
- Salimgarh Fort
- Red Fort Archaeological Museum, located in the Mumtaz Mahal, Red Fort
- Gali Qasim Jan in Ballimaran is the site of Mirza Ghalib's haveli, and that of Hakim Ajmal Khan
- Razia Sultana's‍—‌ tomb near Kalan Masjid
- Jama Masjid, India's largest mosque
- Lal Mandir, Delhi's oldest Jain temple
- Nili Chhatri Temple, a Hindu temple dedicated to Shiva
- Fatehpuri Masjid
- Khari Baoli, Asia's biggest spice market
- Zinat-ul Masjid, Daryaganj built-in 1710 by one of Aurangzeb's daughters
- Partition Museum, Delhi, located in the Dara Shukoh Library Building once part of the Mughal prince Dara Shukoh's palace
- Kalan Masjid, 14th-century mosque in Old Delhi
- St. James Church (near Kashmiri Gate) built-in 1836, Delhi's oldest church, built by Col. James Skinner.
- Golden Mosque, the mosque is located outside the southwestern corner of the Delhi Gate

Some of the historical mansions (or Haveli's) include:

- Dharampura Haveli a restored heritage hotel
- Haveli of Mirza Ghalib, Gali Qasim Jan, in Ballimaran
- Chunnamal haveli, Katra Neel
- Kathika Cultural Centre and Museum (Haveli)
- Naughara mansions in Kinari Bazar, 18th-century Jain mansions
- Masterji Kee Haveli, Sita Ram Bazar
- Haveli Sharif Manzil in Ballimaran is famous for its Aristocratic Hakims and their Unani practice, and that of Hakim Ajmal Khan
- Haveli of Zeenat Mahal, Lal Kuan Bazar
- Kucha Chelan (Kucha Chehle Ameeran), where the Persian descent inhabited
- Begum Samru's Palace of 1806 now called Bhagirath Palace.
- Khazanchi haveli
- Haveli Raja Jugal Kishore
- Haksar Haveli, Bazar Sitaram, where Jawaharlal Nehru was married in 1916 to Kamla Nehru.
- Haveli Naharwali, Kucha Sadullah Khan, where Pervez Musharraf, former president of Pakistan was born

=== Other points of interest ===
==== Omaxe mall ====
The Omaxe Mall is a mall that opened in Old Delhi around 2024 and has a multilevel parking lot, an exotic food court, and extensive retail space. Built with a mosaic dome adorned inside in mismatched art and motif architecture. The food court is said to be the largest in India, with the restaurants specialising in Indian or Mughlai cuisine.

==== Arch Bridge between Salimgarh Fort and Red Fort ====
The arch bridge between Salimgarh Fort and Red Fort was originally built by Emperor Jahangir around 1622, which connects the Salimgarh fort with the Red Fort. Long before the Red Fort was built, the bridge was modified many times and lastly by the British, and is located at the northeastern end of the Red Fort complex on the Inner Ring Road.

==== Charti Lal Goel Heritage Park ====
The Charti Lal Goel Heritage Park is a park opened in Old Delhi in 2022 near the Jama Masjid, developed as a cultural hub and named after Charti Lal Goel, a politician. The Charti Lal Goel Heritage Park provides panoramic views of both Red Fort and the Jama Masjid behind it.

== Shahjahanabad cuisine ==
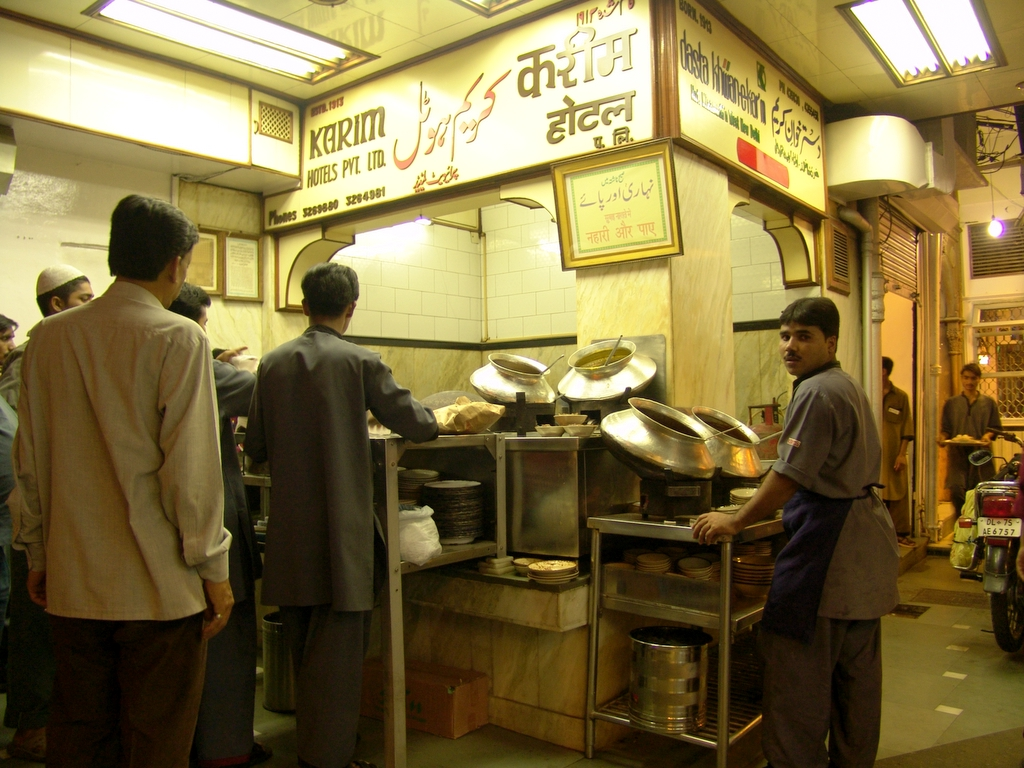
Historic Karim's at Old Delhi.

Old Delhi is well known for its cuisine. Old Delhi being the seat of the Mughal Empire for over two centuries has led to it being the modern hub of Mughlai cuisine. Karim's, a restaurant described as the city's most famous culinary destination, is near the Jama Masjid. The Gali Paranthe Wali and Ghantewala halwai are also situated here. Chawri Bazaar is one of the oldest markets in Delhi, dating back to the 17th century and was before known as a hardware market, but is known nowadays for its wholesale paper products.

Old Delhi is also known for its street food. Chandni Chowk and Chawri Bazaar areas have many street joints that sell spicy chaat (tangy and spicy snacks).

== Culinary history ==
Old Delhi has certain identifiable landmarks of food. These include:

=== Paranthe Wali Gali ===
Pandit Gaya Prasad shifted from Agra to Delhi in 1876, in search of a better life. In Delhi, he set up a single shop business selling hot paranthas. The product gained popularity to an extent that he required the aid of his family members for help in the production. Eventually, Paranthe wali Gali, the lane in which the original shop was, came to house 16 of them. It is now run by the families of Pandit Gaya Prasad and his relatives. The sixth-generation continues to run four of the sixteen original shops that remain.

=== Karim's ===
Having been in the business of catering to Mughal Emperors, the family that runs it was displaced following the Revolt of 1857. In 1911, Haji Karimuddin moved back to Delhi with inspiration to open a Dhaba to cater to people coming to witness the coronation from all across the country. It was in 1913 that he established the Karim Hotel in Gali Kababian, Jama Masjid. Karim's exists here today to cater to the wants of people from all over the country and the world, being a major tourist attraction.

=== Kallu Nihari ===
Nihari is a traditional meat stew that is slowly cooked to preserve its taste and the tenderness of its ingredients. Kallu Nihari is a shop in Old Delhi that has served the dish exclusively since it was opened by the late Mohammed Rafiquddin (better known as Kallu Mian) in 1990. The shop, which is well known in the area, has served millions of portions.

=== Harnarains ===
Harnarain Gokalchand was a pickle and murabba shop that was originally established in Khari Baoli by the name Harnarain Gopinath in 1857. It is often considered to be one of India's first commercially available pickle brands and was at the time India's largest food preservers. Their pickles and sharbat have been a household delicacy for over a century and a half, and have even served Jawaharlal Nehru and Indira Gandhi. Having started from a small shop in Khari Baoli, Old Delhi, it has now become a global brand that goes by the name Harnarains International.

=== Banta ===
Characterised by a codd-neck bottle, Banta is a drink that has survived in Old Delhi since 1872. The glass bottle in which this comes has a marble stopper, which is pushed into the bulbous neck of the bottle to unseal it. Engineer Hiram Codd patented the design of the bottle in 1872 in London to effectively seal fizzy drinks.

The Banta bottles even contributed to the Indian National movement. This was so as protestors and rioters would often use these bottles as improvised cannons by adding calcium hydroxide to the mix. Thus, the bottles were banned in many cities across the country at some point before 1947.

== Economic structure ==
Old Delhi has markets running through its streets. The area is vast and multiple products are being sold. Most of them are wholesale sellers and have been selling their products for many years. One such business is Gulab Singh Johrimal (a perfumery) which was established in Dariba Kalan in 1816 mainly as an attar (perfume) manufacturing business. Since then they have diversified into compounding, incense and toilet soap manufacture. Their retail outlet in Chandni Chowk was started later on. Another such shop is Harnarains (manufacturers of pickles and preserves), located in Khari Baoli. Under operation since 1944, it is one of the older shops currently located in Old Delhi. Some migrants sell products like clothes, fruits etc. The sellers of one product often form an association to serve their interests and negotiate with the local government and other official bodies. The Old Delhi area and its markets are governed by the Municipal Corporation of Delhi (MCD). The Shahjahanabad Redevelopment Corporation (SRDC) is a government of Delhi undertaking focused on conserving heritage and to act as a catalyst for transforming the historically significant but congested place into a functional, tourist-friendly, and economically vibrant zone.

== See also ==
- History of Delhi
- Timeline of Delhi
- List of tourist attractions in Delhi

== Footnotes ==
- H.C. Fanshawe (1998). Delhi, past and present. Asian Educational Services. ISBN 81-206-1318-X.
- Stephen P. Blake (2002). Shahjahanabad: The Sovereign City in Mughal India 1639-1739. Cambridge University Press. ISBN 0-521-52299-4.
