= Gurukul Kangri University =

University in Haridwar, India

Gurukula Kangri (Deemed to be University)
- Type: Public Deemed Institute (1962)
- Established: 1902; 124 years ago 1962; 64 years ago (as Deemed University)
- Founder: Swami Shraddhanand
- Accreditation: NAAC A, AICTE, MoE, ACU
- Affiliations: UGC, AICTE, ACU, PCI
- Budget: 150 crore
- Chancellor: Surendra Kumar Arya
- Vice-Chancellor: Pratibha Mehta Luthra
- Students: 6000+
- Location: Haridwar, Uttarakhand, India, 249404, India; 29°55′12.16″N 78°7′22.69″E
- Campus: 305 acres (main campus); Urban
- Nickname: GK (DU) GKVians
- Website: www.gkv.ac.in

Gurukula Kangri University also known as Gurukula Kangri Vishwavidyalaya is an Indian government-funded deemed university u/s 3 of the UGC Act 1956 located in Haridwar, Uttarakhand, India. Situated near the bank of the Ganges, Haridwar and about 200 km from New Delhi, the Gurukula Kangri has 25 academic departments covering Engineering, Applied Sciences, Vedic Sciences, Humanities and Social Sciences and Management programs with a strong emphasis on Vedic and Modern Sciences and technological education and research. The university has signed about 34 memorandums of understanding with industries, universities, NGOs, and institutions. It has its jurisdiction over entire Uttar Pradesh.

== History ==
Gurukula Kangri (Deemed to be University) was founded on 4 March 1902 by the Arya Samaj sannyasi Swami Shraddhanand, who was a follower of Dayananda Saraswati, with the sole aim to revive the ancient Indian gurukula system of education. This institution was established with the objective of providing an indigenous alternative to Lord Macaulay's education policy by imparting education in the areas of Vedic literature, Indian philosophy, Indian culture, modern sciences, and research.

The Arya Samaj which advocated women's education, as part of its policies for the upliftment of women in the country, established the Kanya Gurukula Campus, Dehradun in 1922 by Acharya Ramdevji making it a second campus of women's education. But to give real shape to the dreams of Swami Shraddhanandaji, Kanya Gurukula Campus, Haridwar was established in 1993.

The Gurukula has witnessed many distinguished guests. A few of them being C. F. Andrews, Ramsay MacDonald, Mahatma Gandhi, Pt. Madan Mohan Malaviya, Dr. Rajendra Prasad, Dr. Sarvepalli Radhakrishnan, Sh. Jamnalal Bajaj, Dr. Munje, Sadhu Vaswani, Pt. Jawaharlal Nehru, Smt. Indira Gandhi and Sh. Giani Zail Singh, Sh. L.K. Advani and in 2011 Smt. Meira Kumar the then speaker of the Lok Sabha, Amit Shah, Jagdeep Dhankhar, Arif Mohmmad Khan, Ramesh Pokhriyal, Swami Ramdev, Acharya Balkrishna.

The impetus for the foundation was found in the teachings and activities of Dayananda Saraswati, founder of the Arya Samaj. The first foundation brick was laid down in Gujranwala, Punjab. Swami Ji searched for a suitable palace in India according to the imagination of Dayananda Saraswati as mentioned in Satyarth Prakash. The Gurukula was shifted to Kangri Village of Bijnor district. There was a heavy flooded when the river changed course in 1924; the new and present campus was built subsequently on National Highway. The buildings of Gurukula in Kangri Village still exist. It is called as 'Punya Bhumi'. The Gurukula at Kangri had a mix of vedic and modern science education since its inception. Impressed by the devotion of Swami ji, the entire land mass of more than 1000 bigah was donated by Munshi Aman Singh of Bijnaur District to Panjab Arya Pratinidhi Sabha exclusively for the purposes of Gurukula Education. Swamiji had donated his entire wealth for the Gurukula. He was a visionary who propagated vedic education and use of Hindi as primary language of instruction in the Gurukula.

== Campuses ==
The university has separate Campuses for Men and Women.

- Main Campus, Gurukula Kangri (Deemed to be University), Haridwar (Boys)
- Kanya Campus, Haridwar (Girls)
- Kanya Gurukul Mahavidhyalaya, Dehradun (Girls)
- Faculty of Engineering and Technology, Haridwar (Boys)

== Faculties and Departments ==
Faculty of Oriental Studies

1. Department of Ancient Indian History, Culture and Archaeology
2. Department of Shradhanand Vedic Shodh Sansthan
3. Department of Sanskrit
4. Department of Veda
5. Department of Jyotihsastra and Karmkand

Faculty of Arts & Humanities

1. Department of Philosophy
2. Department of Psychology
3. Department of Hindi
4. Department of English
5. Department of Sociology
6. Department of Political science
7. Department of Geography

Faculty of Sciences

1. Department of Mathematics & Statistics
2. Department of Physics
3. Department of Chemistry
4. Department of Computer Science

Faculty of Life Sciences

1. Department of Zoology and Environmental Science
2. Department of Botany & Microbiology

Faculty of Management Studies

1. Department of Management Studies

Faculty of Engineering & Technology

1. Department of Computer Science & Engineering
2. Department of Electronics and Communication Engineering
3. Department of Electrical Engineering
4. Department of Mechanical Engineering
5. Department of Civil Engineering

Faculty of Ayurveda & Medical Sciences

1. Department of Pharmaceutical Sciences
2. Department of Ayurvedic Medicine (affiliated to Uttrakhand Ayurvedic University)

Faculty of Yoga and Physical Education

1. Department of Physical Education & Sports
2. Department of Yogic Sciences

Faculty of Education

== Courses offered ==
Courses	Ph.D/Research Subjects
Undergraduate Courses: B.A.; B.A. (Hons) in Veda/Sanskrit/Philosophy; B.Tech. (ECE, CSE, EE, ME, CE); B.P.Ed; B.Sc. (Maths Group- Phy/Chem/Comp Sc/Maths); B.Sc. (Bio Group-Zool/Bot/Chem/Ind. Micro.); B.Pharma; B.B.A; B.P. E.S; Bachelor in Journalism (Hindi); B.Sc in Yogic Science; B.Sc in Computer Science; Diploma Courses: P.G. Diploma in Yogic Science; Diploma in Pharmacy (D. Pharm.); Diploma in Vedic Paurohitya (Karmkand); Diploma in Technology/Engineering (D.Tech.); Polytechnic; Certificate Courses: Yoga; Postgraduate Courses: M.Tech./M.E; M.Pharm.; M.A. Sanskrit; M.A. English; M.A./M.Sc. Psychology; M.A./M.Sc. Yogic Science; M.A. Ancient Ind. History Cult. & Archaeology; M.A. Hindi; M.A. Philosophy; M.A. Veda; M.A. Jyotirvigyan & Vedic Karmakand; M.A. Music; M.Sc. Mathematics; M.Sc. Physics; M.Sc. Chemistry; M.Sc. Microbiology; M.Sc. Environmental Science; MCA; MBA, MBA(BE); M.P. Ed	Sanskrit, English, Hindi, Vedic Literature Ancient Indian History Cult. & Arch. Psychology, Philosophy Yogic Science Mathematics, Chemistry, Physics Microbiology, Environmental Science Management, Computer Science, Zoology, Botany Physical Education Pharmaceutical Science Electronics & Communication Engg. Computer Science & Engg Mechanical Engg. Applied Science (Physics) Applied Science (Chemistry) Applied Science (Math)

== Notable alumni ==
- Chetan Anand
- Nawazuddin Siddiqui
- Swami Ramdev (Patanjali Yoga)
- Acharya Balkrishna (Patanjali)
- Sudhakar Chaturvedi
- Deepti Atrish (CEO - PCL Health)
- Assem Gupta (Senior Director - NIC Delhi)
- Dr. Yoganand Shastri
- Varun Belwal (Dy. Sports Officer - Uttarakhand)
- Swami Karmveer
- Dr. Vinay Nangia
- Amarnath Vidyalankar
- Pandit Ami Chandra
- Sukama Acharya
- Vinayak Rao Koratkar
- Dr. Harish Chandra (Scientist - IIRS)
- Dr. Rajat Agrawal (HOD - IIT Roorkee)
- Ambrish Kumar
- Sudhir Mittal (GM - Delhi Metro)
- Deepak Vats (UGC - Joint Secretary)
- Madan Kaushik (MLA Uttarakhand)
- Swami Yatishwaranand (Former Cabinet Minister)
- Lt. Col Chetan Singh Kabsuri (Indian Army)
- Ravi Bahadur (MLA Uttarakhand)
- Kranti Singh (Uttarakhand Transport Department)
- Ajay Meena (IPS Officer)
- Anand Kumar (IPS Officer)
- Dr. Sudhir Kumar (Prof. - JNU Delhi)
- Dr. Arun K. Pal (Prof. - GB Pantnagar University)
- Prof. Girish K. Sharma (DSEU Delhi)

== Achievements ==
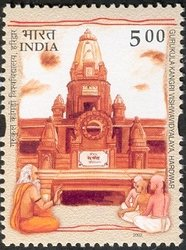
Stamp of India - 2002 Gurukula Kangri Vishwavidyalaya Hardwar

- A+ Grade was provided by National Assessment and Accreditation Council (NAAC) in 2015.
- Deemed University Status: The distinguished services of this institution to the nation were recognized when it was given the status of Deemed to be University in 1962 by University Grants Commission.
- Four-Star Status: National Accreditation and Assessment Council (NAAC) has awarded four-star status to the Vishwavidyalaya in 2015 valid up to 15 November 2020.
- Centenary Year: Vishwavidyalaya celebrated 2002 as its centenary year.
- Membership: Gurukula Kangri Vishwavidyalaya is a Registered autonomous institute. All the degrees conferred by the vishwavidyalaya are recognized by UGC and AICTE wherever required.
- Gurukula Kangri Vishwavidyalaya is a member of the Association of Indian Universities.
