= Kanniah Yogi =

Indian writer (1880-1990)

Dr. Pandit G Kanniah Yogi
- Born: 27 May 1880; Coimbatore, Tamil Nadu, India
- Died: 2 December 1990 (aged 110); Chennai, Tamil Nadu, India
- Other names: Dr Pandit G Kanniah Yogi, Kannaiyan
- Occupation(s): Author, spiritual Teacher
- Children: 3
- Website: www.kanniahyogi.com

Kanniah Yogi : Yoga Maharathna Doctor Pandit G Kanniah Yogi Tamil: கண்ணையா யோகி was one of the extraordinary Acharyas in the field of yoga, vedanta, yantra, mantra and tantra in Chennai.

== Early life ==
Yogi was born on 29 May 1880 to Mrs & Mr. Guruswamy at Coimbatore, Tamil Nadu. His father was famous in Nadi astrology. He was very much interested in seeing God during his early stages.

== Spiritual life ==
At the age of six years, Kanniah Yogi was taken to Sri Agastya's (Head of the Saptarshi) Ashram and trained for eighteen years in a secret Nilgiri hermitage by Agastya Maharishi and Pulippani Maharishi 4 Vedas, 96 Philosophy, Secret of Shapes of All Languages, Yantra, Tantra & Mantras, totally 64 Aats, totally 512 Sidhis were taught by them. After his training in order to pass on his wisdom he was sent back again to Coimbatore.

He was ordered by his Guru Sri Agastya Maharishi to lead marriage life and to teach 10% Yoga that he learnt in Ashram. Then he returned to Coimbatore and married. He was blessed with two kids.

During his lifetime, he started Athma Yoga Gnana Sabha for giving training to the people. Even now, the valuable teachings of Sri Kanniah Yogi have passed on to aspirants in many countries around the world. Many of his students have awakened their inner power and experienced blissful meditation through the techniques taught therein.

== Disciples ==
His devotees are spread all over the world. Swami Murugesu, Sarvashree Yogi Janardhana Guruji and Rudolph were some of his famous disciples.

== Death ==
He died on 2 December 1990.

== Books ==
He had written many Tamil books. Most of them are manuscripted, cyclostyled and distributed. Great efforts are made by his disciples to collect the handwritten articles and publish as printed book. Some of the published books are:

- Life History of Kanniah Yogi
- Aanmiga Padaipugal Part 1 (Maanasa Yogam)
- Aanmiga Padaipugal Part 2 to Part 11
- Sri Gayathri Upasana Pathadhi

He had written prose for many spiritual Sanskrit books. One of the famous was Satyarth Prakash released by Arya Samaj The Light of Truth written by Swami Dayananda Saraswati.
