= Arya Samaj in South Africa =

AUM or OM is considered by the Arya Samaj to be the highest and most proper name of God.

Arya Samaj is a Hindu reform movement in South Africa. Like other parts of the world where people of Indian origin are settled, the teachings of Swami Dayananda Saraswati, founder of the Arya Samaj, made their way to South Africa during the beginning of the twentieth century. The Arya Samaj encouraged Indian South Africans to take pride in their heritage and culture and promoted education and social reform.

== History ==
=== Early preachers and missionaries ===
Bhai Parmanand, the first Arya Samaj missionary to arrive in South Africa, arrived on 5 August 1905. During his four-month stay, he travelled to Johannesburg, Pretoria and Cape Town. He was a dynamic orator in both English and Hindi and was received with enthusiasm by the local Indian community, including Mahatma Gandhi. He delivered discourses on Hindu culture, religion, Indian civilisation, faith in God, ceremonies, the importance of the mother tongue and education. He emphasised the importance and significance of festivals and since then Deepavali has come to be recognised as a festival of Hindus. He established grassroots Arya Samaj committees to consolidate Hinduism amongst the Indians, established the Hindu Reform Society of Durban and the Hindu Young Men's Association in Pietermaritzburg and motivated the formation of the Hindu Maha Sabha, an organisation bringing together the diverse Hindu groups under one banner.

Swami Shankaranand, who arrived in South Africa on 4 October 1908, urged Hindus to have pride in their religion and stressed the importance of religious lectures, rites and the study of Indian vernaculars. He succeeded in making Deepavali, the birth of Lord Rama and the birth of Lord Krishna important dates in the Hindu calendar. He founded Veda Dharma Sabhas in Durban and Pietermaritzburg but his greatest contribution was the establishment of the Hindu Maha Sabha in 1912.

The first locally born Arya Samaj activist was Pundit Bhawani Dayal, who returned from India at the age of twenty in 1912. He preached the Vedic religion and pioneered the propagation of Hindi in South Africa. He and his wife, involved themselves in Gandhi's satyagraha and were both imprisoned. In 1916, he organised a Hindi literary conference in Ladysmith and was the editor of two local Hindi language newspapers.

Another preacher, Swami Mangalanand Puri, came to Natal in 1913. He delivered lectures under the auspices of the Arya Yuvak Sabha and proved to be an eloquent Hindi orator. During his time, he attracted many young men who joined the Arya Samaj. In 1921 Pundit Ishwardutt Vedalankar, a graduate of Gurukul Kangadi (in India), came to Natal under the banner of the Arya Yuvak Sabha. As an eloquent speaker he attracted large audiences of all faiths. He concentrated on the correct performance of religious ceremonies and drew large crowds at Ramayan recitals.

=== Establishment of a central organisation ===
By the beginning of the 1920s, a number of Arya Samajs had been established in Natal. Under the guidance of D.G. Satyadeva, the Arya Pratinidhi Sabha in Natal was established on 22 February 1925, with its headquarters in Durban. The first officials elected were Pt Bhawani Dayal (President), B A Maghrajh (Secretary), P R Pather (assist Secretary), and R K Kaptain (Treasurer). Two years later on 23 October 1927, the Arya Pratinidhi Sabha, Natal, was to affiliated to the Sarvadeshik Arya Pratinidhi Sabha (International Arya League).

== Aims and activities of Arya Pratinidhi Sabha (SA) ==
The aims of Arya Pratinidhi Sabha (SA) are to encourage the establishment, organisation and consolidation of Arya Samajs and Vedic institutions in South Africa, elucidate the tenets of Arya Samaj and to foster these principles in the country, disseminate Vedic religion and philosophy, promote the art, culture and civilisation of India, encourage and advocate the study of Hindi and other Indian languages, protect and defend the rights of Hindus and to concern itself with their spiritual, moral and social upliftment, and to co-operate with other Hindu organisations on matters affecting the Hindu Community.

=== Visiting preachers and missionaries ===
Many learned Vedic scholars and highly trained preachers visited South Africa under the auspices of the Arya Pratinidhi Sabha to promote Vedic Culture. These included:

- Professor Ralaram of D A V College, Hoshiarpur, India who arrived in 1931 and delivered lectures on the Vedic religion.
- Mehta Jaimini who arrived in 1934 and launched the South African Hindu Maha Sabha.
- Pundit Anand Priyaji, who arrived with a contingent of girls' guides from Arya Kanya Mahavidyalaya of Baroda, India, and gave a display of physical culture, sang national and religious songs and through their forceful impressive speeches spread the teachings of the Vedic Religion.
- Professor Yashpal in 1937 and demonstrated the powers of Yoga.
- Pundit Rishiram visited South Africa in 1937 and 1945 and carried out teachings based on the Vedas, Upanishads and Gita.

=== Veda Niketan ===
The Veda Niketan concentrates on the dissemination of the Vedic religion by means of publication of literature and production of any material e.g. cassettes - audio and video, compact discs, software, websites and conducts a series of graded examinations on Hindu Dharma.

=== Vedic Purohit Mandal ===
The Vedic Purohit Mandal (Academy of Vedic Priests) conducts systematic classes for the training of priests regardless of caste, creed, gender or colour. The Mandal enjoys a large membership of women priests.

=== Hindi Education ===
Arya Samaj has always encouraged the teaching of Hindi. In 1925, an organisation for the promotion of Hindi within the Arya Samaj, the Hindi Siksha Sangh (Hindi Education Union) was established. The Sangh established a uniform syllabus, conducted Hindi classes and wrote examinations.
