= GKV =

GKV may refer to:

- G. K. Venkatesh (1927–1993), Indian composer
- Gurukul Kangri Vishwavidyalaya, a university in the city of Haridwar, Uttarakhand, India
- Reformed Churches in the Netherlands (Liberated)
