= Arya Samaj in Thailand =

AUM or OM is considered by the Arya Samaj to be the highest and most proper name of God.

The availability of Satyarth Prakash (Light of Truth), inspired some people of Indian origin in Bangkok to follow the teachings of Swami Dayanand Saraswati and form the Vedic Dharam Pracharni Sabha on 5 May 1920. Weekly gatherings were held for the propagation of Vedic religion. Land was purchased and a Vedic mandir (temple) constructed. A library was also established. In 1922 the name of the Sabha (organisation) was changed to Arya Samaj and in 1923 it was affiliated with the Arya Pratinidhi Sabha (Arya Representative Organisation) of Uttar Pradesh in India. Although a small organisation, the Sabha has raised funds for relief fund for natural disasters in India. It also organises the celebration of Hindu festivals.
