= Ganga Prasad (disambiguation) =

Ganga Prasad may refer to

- Ganga Prasad (born 1939), Governor of Meghalaya.
- Ganga Prasad Birla (1922–2010), Indian industrialist.
- Ganga Prasad Pradhan (1851–1932), Nepali Christian pastor.
- Ganga Prasad Upadhyaya (1871–1968), Indian academic.
- Ganga Prasad Vimal (1940–2019), Indian writer.
- Ganga Prasad Lake, Freshwater Wetland in Bihar, India
