= Rigvedadi Bhashya Bhumika =

Book by Dayanand Saraswati

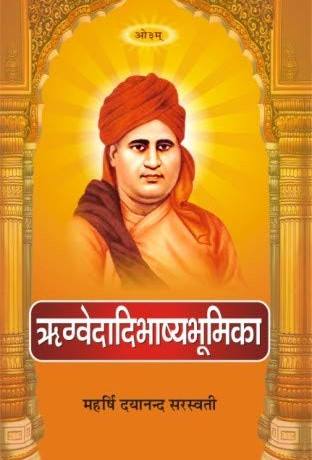
- Cover page of the first edition
- Author: Dayanand Saraswati
- Language: Hindi
- Publisher: Vijaykumar Govindram Hasanand
- Publication place: British India
- ISBN: 978-8170771630

Rigvedadi Bhashya Bhumika (also known as Introduction to Vedas) is a book originally written in Hindi by Dayanand Saraswati, a nineteenth-century social reformer and religious leader in India. His other notable book was Satyarth Prakash.

== Purpose ==
The book was written with the purpose of introducing teachings of the Vedas, an ancient scripture related to Hinduism, to a lay audience. Saraswati believed that various misconceptions had been created by interpretations of the Vedas propagated by scholars such as Sayana, Mahidhara, Ralph T. H. Griffith, and Max Müller.
