= Arya Samaj in Burma =

AUM or OM is considered by the Arya Samaj to be the highest and most proper name of God.

Arya Samaj was first established in the cities of Mandalay and Rangoon in Burma in 1898. By the time the Arya Pratinidhi Sabha of Rangoon was formed in 1930, there were twenty-two Arya Samajs in Burma. The separation of Burma from India in 1937 was a setback for the Arya Samaj and the onset of the Second World War completely disrupted its activities.

On 14 April 1952, the Arya Pratinidhi Sabha of Rangoon was revived by Pandit Ganga Prasad Upadhyaya who was visiting Burma from India. Other Arya Samaj preachers came to Burma and the Arya Samaj was reinvigorated. In 1959 the Satyarth Prakash (Light of Truth) was translated in Burmese together with other Arya Samaj literature. Annual conference started to be held in different centres where Arya Samajs were based.
