= Virajanand Dandeesha =

Indian scholar (1778–1868)

Swami Virajanand Dandeesha
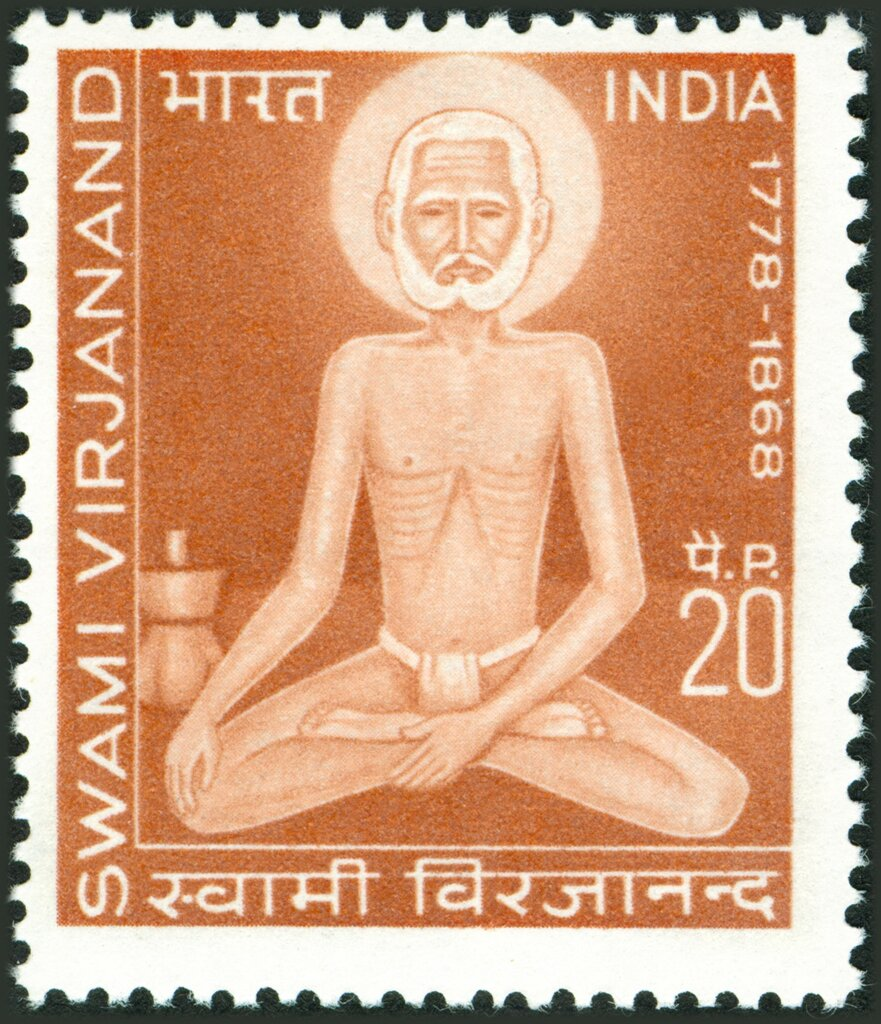

Personal life
- Born: 1778 Kartarpur, Singhpuria Misl (Present day Jalandhar, Punjab)
- Died: 14 September 1868 (aged 89–90)

Religious life
- Religion: Hinduism
- Philosophy: Vedic

Religious career
- Teacher: Purnanand Saraswati
- Disciples: Dayanand Saraswati
- Influenced by: Mīmāṃsā, Vedanta etc.

Swami Virajanand Dandeesha (Sanskrit: स्वामी विरजानन्द दण्डीश; 1778 – 14 September 1868), also known as the Blind Sage of Mathura, was the celebrated teacher of Arya Samaj founder, Dayanand Saraswati. He was a scholar and teacher of Sanskrit grammar and Vedic literature.

== Early life ==
Virajanand was born in Kartarpur near Jalandhar in the year 1778 CE (1835 SV) in a Punjabi Saraswat Brahmin family. His father's name was Narayan Dutta Sharma.. At the age of five, he lost his eyesight from an attack of small pox. Soon thereafter his father who had initiated him into the rudiments of Sanskrit learning died. Leaving him to the mercy of his elder brother and sister-in-law at very young age. As they did not treat him well, the temperamental Virjanand soon left their home.

His wanderings took him to Rishikesh where he led a life of meditation and austerity for about three years. Tradition has it that Swami Virjanand left Rishikesh for Hardwar at the instance of a divine command. At Hardwar, he came in contact with The Swami Purnanand Giri, a Sanskrit scholar who initiated him into sannyasa. Purnanand created in him a deep love for Sanskrit grammar and for the "Arsha" Shastras (scriptures authored by Rishis). Soon, he began to master other branches of Sanskrit literature, and also took up teaching others.

Virjanand left for Varanasi (Kashi), the well-known city for Sanskrit learning and for higher studies. Here he lived for about 10 years, mastering Mīmāṃsā, Vedanta, Ayurveda, etc. Soon, he came to occupy a place of eminence among the scholars of Varanasi. From Varanasi, Virjanand went to Gaya where he made a comprehensive and critical study of Upanishads continuing the work he had done at Hardwar and at Varanasi. From Gaya, Virjanand went to Calcutta which was, at that time, attracting Sanskrit talent from all over the country. At Calcutta, he lived for a number of years impressing the citizens with his mastery of Sanskrit grammar and literature. In spite of the material comforts he had at Calcutta, Virjanand soon left that city and settled at Gadia Ghat on the banks of the Ganges. It was here that the then Maharaja of Alwar came across him and was greatly impressed. On the invitation of the Maharaja, he went to Alwar where he stayed for some time. At the request of the Maharaja, he wrote "Shabda-Bodh", the manuscript of which is still treasured in the library at Alwar. From Alwar, Virjanand went to Soron and from there to Mathura.

== Pathshala in Mathura and Dayanand ==
At Mathura he established a pathshala ( grammar school) to which students flocked from all over the country. The expenses of the pathshala were met by donations from the Rajput Princes and no fees were charged from the pupils.

Incidentally, at about the same time, Dayanand Saraswati had been wandering all over the country in search of a guru. Dayanand came across a monk, Poornashrama Swamy. He heard the story of Dayanand`s wanderings and told him, "There is only one man on this earth who can fulfill your desire, and that man is Virajananda Dandeesha. He lives in Mathura." Thus, in 1860, Dayanand traveled to Mathura to meet Virjanand. In their first meeting, Virjanand inquired about his objective and education. Upon learning that he had studied 'Kaumudi' and 'Saraswatha', two famous texts on Sanskrit grammar, he asked Dayanand to throw them into the river Yamuna and then come back.

Dayanand surrendered himself at the feet of the great master. Virjanand was a task master and he expected a high standard of diligence and discipline from his students. Even though he was blind, he could clear all doubts of his disciples, quoting verbatim passages from scriptures.

Dayanand underwent a rigorous training under Virjanand, whom he promised to devote his life to the revival of Hinduism, and work to spread "Arsha" literature and knowledge of Vedas.

== Death and legacy ==
Virjanand died on 14 September 1868, at the age of 90. On 14 September 1971, the Post and Telegraph Department of India released a stamp in his honor depicting the Swami in a sitting posture.
