= Pandit Lekh Ram =

Social reformer and Arya Samaj leader

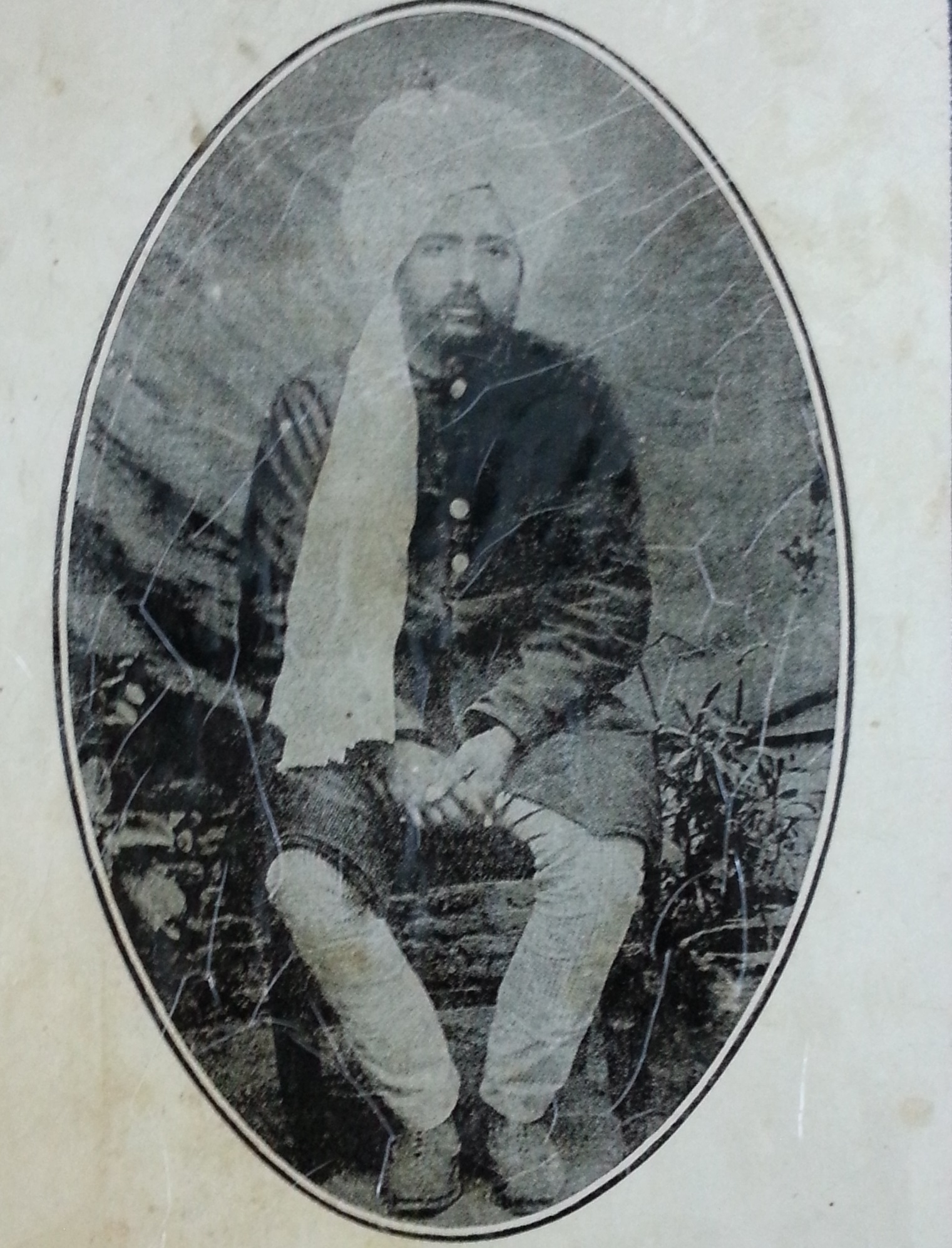
- Portrait of Pandit Lekh Ram
- Born: April 1858; Sayyedpur, Jhelum District, Punjab, British India
- Died: 6 March 1897 (aged 38); Lahore, Punjab, British India
- Cause of death: Assassination
- Known for: Religious leader; Social worker; Independence activist; Social reformer; Publicist; Writer

Pandit Lekh Ram (April 1858 – 6 March 1897) was a 19th-century social reformer, publicist, and writer from Punjab, India. He was the leader of the radical wing within the Arya Samaj, an Indian Hindu reform movement. He was known for his criticism of the caste system, superstitions, and blind faith prevalent in Hindu society. He also advocated for the education and empowerment of women. He is also known particularly for his encounters with Mirza Ghulam Ahmad, the founder of the Ahmadiyya movement, and as a subject of his death prophecy. Lekh Ram's outspoken views and writings made him a controversial figure, and he faced opposition and violence from conservative Hindus and Muslims. He was assassinated by an unidentified assailant on 6 March 1897

== Early life ==
Pandit Lekh Ram was born in April 1858 in a small village of Pindi Saidpur, Jhelum District. His father's name was Tara Singh and his mother was Bhag Bhari. He served in the Punjab Police for some years, and when posted at Peshawar, he came under the influence of the teachings of Munshi Kanhaiya Lal Alakhdhari and learned of the Arya Samaj movement and its founder Dayanand Saraswati. He resigned the Police service voluntarily and devoted his life for the propagation of Vedas and became a preacher of Punjab Arya Pratinidhi Sabha. He was the founder of the Arya Samaj branch in Peshawar. He was married and had one son who died in early childhood.

== Activities ==
After joining the Peshawar Arya Samaj Lekh Ram began actively propagating the teachings of the Samaj and Vedic religion. He also spoke against cow-slaughter and promoted the use of Hindi in government schools. He became the editor of the Arya Gazette, an Urdu monthly, and soon led the group of Samajists who were more radical in their opposition towards other faiths. Lekh Ram wrote the biography of Dayanand Saraswati and some 33 other books in Urdu. Some of which were translated in English, Hindi and Sindhi. He was reported to be an enthusiastic debater. As a speaker of Arabic and Persian, he was involved in debates in multiple languages and was active in re-converting Muslims to Hinduism who were previously converted from Hinduism to Islam. His writings drew constant criticism from the Muslim press.

== Lekh Ram and Islam ==
While Dayanand Saraswati's polemics against Islam largely addressed doctrinal issues, later Samaj writers, including Lekh Ram, drew more heavily upon historical conflicts between Hindus and Muslims as well as the communal tensions of nineteenth century Punjab in an attempt to tie them with Islamic doctrine. Unlike their disputes with the Christians, the struggle between the Samajists and the Muslims quickly came to centre around two figures—Lekh Ram himself, representing the Samaj as a reformed Hinduism, and Mirza Ghulam Ahmad (1835–1908), the founder of the Ahmadiyya movement which claimed to be a revitalised Islam. In their general critique of Islam, the Samajists often targeted Ahmad and his claims to spiritual authority specifically. When Ahmad published the Surma-i-Chashm-i-Arya (Antimony to Open the Eyes of the Aryas), Lekh Ram wrote Nuskha-i-Khabt-i-Ahmadiyya (A Prescription for the Madness of the Ahmadiyya). Following Ahmad's Barahin-i-Ahmadiyya (The Ahmadi Proofs), Lekh Ram published his refutation titled Takzeeb Barahin-i-Ahmadiyya (Falsification of the Barahin-i-Ahmadiyya), opening up a series of disputations between the two sides. In 1892, Lekh Ram published his controversial treatise, Risala-i-Jihad ya'ni Din-i-Muhammadi ki Buniyad (A Treatise on Holy War or the Basis of the Muhammadan Religion). The treatise—which drew and expanded upon Dayanand's Satyarth Prakash (The Light of Truth), a work which also criticised Christianity, Buddhism and Sikhism—accused Islam of being a warlike and sensual faith and escalated already existing communal tensions between Hindus and Muslims in the early 1890s.

=== The subject of prophecy ===
Amid the polemical exchanges, Mirza Ghulam Ahmad published an announcement in 1893 in which he prophesied that Lekh Ram will face divine punishment and die in violent circumstances within six years, speaking of him as a "lifeless bellowing calf", and stated that the fateful day will be very close to the Muslim festival of Eid al-Fitr.

=== Assassination ===
Four years later, on 6 March 1897, the day following Eid, Lekh Ram was stabbed to death while staying in Lahore, purportedly by a Muslim. The assassin was a stranger to the city but had been staying with Lekh Ram for three weeks under the pretext of wishing to become a Hindu. Lekh Ram was cremated and the ashes dispersed into a river. His assassination caused a great shock among the Arya Samaj throughout the Punjab and his funeral drew an estimated 20,000 people at the burning ghat. The Hindu press as well as the police suspected a Muslim offended by Lekh Ram's writings. While Arya leaders were confident that the assassin would be arrested, a police investigation failed to apprehend the assassin. The assassination also intensified communal tensions between Hindus and Muslims in the months that followed and generated a heightened sense of trepidation among both with mutual threats, boycotts and cases of street violence between rival groups. For his part, Ahmad maintained that he had no hand in the fulfillment of the prophecy other than through purely spiritual means and although he was suspected by some, nothing could be proven. Press speculation as to the assassin's identity, as well as rumours of his capture, resurfaced intermittently throughout the year.

== Works ==
All his 33 works have been collectively published under the name Kulyaat-e-Arya Musafir by Mahashe Keeshat Dev manager Sattya Dharam Parcharak Haridwar at the Printing Press of Rai Sahib Munshi Gulab Singh Mufeed-e-Aam Press Lahore (1903).

1. Tareekh-e-Dunya

2. Saboot-e-Tanasukh

3. Shri Krishn ka jeevan Charitra

4. Stree Shiksha

5. Stree Shiksha ke wasail

6. Namaste ki Tahqeeqat

7. Shrimad Devi Bhaagvat Pareeksha

8. Puranas Kisne Banai

9. Dharam Parchar

10. Patap Udharan

11. Murda Zaroor Jalana Chahiye

12. Murti Parkash

13. Itre Roohani

14. Saanch ko Aanch Nahi

15. Ram Chadar Ji ka Sacha Darshan

16. Christian Mat Darpan

17. Masal Neug

18. Sadaqat-e-Rigved

19. Nijaat Ki Asli Tareef

20. Sache Dharam ki Shahadat

21. Sadaqat-e-Ilham

22. Sadaqat-e-Usool wa Taleem Aray Samaj

23. Takzeeb-e-Barahin Ahmadiyya Volume 1

24. Takzeeb-e-Barahin Ahmadiyya Volume 2

25. Nuskha Khabte Ahmadiyya

26. Ibtaal Basharaat-e-Ahmadiyya

27. Risala Jihaad

28. Izhaar-e-Haq

29. Hujjat-ul-Islam

30. Rah-e-Nijaat

31. Sadaqat Dharam Arya

32. Radd-e-Khil’at Islam

33. Ayeena-e-Shafa’at
