= Arya Samaj in Guyana =

AUM or OM is considered by the Arya Samaj to be the highest and most proper name of God.

The Ārya Samāj doctrine, a monotheistic Hindu reform movement that rejects the idea of caste and the exclusive role of brahmins as religious leaders, first arrived in Guyana in the early 1900s with the teachings of Swami Dayanand, but grew rapidly after 1910 after the arrival of missionary Bhai Parmānand. Unlike much of mainstream Hinduism, the movement encourages proselytization and opposes the use of images and idols in worship.

== History ==
=== Establishment ===
In 1921, the first Ārya Samāj was formed in Guyana. In 1929, the arrival of a second Vedic missionary, Pandit Mehtā Jaimīnī, led to centralised control and organisation of the Ārya Samāj. Other missionaries arrived in 1935, and in 1936 Pandit Bhaskarānand arrived and remained in Guyana for ten years, organising the various Samājs. The American Aryan League, the parent body for all the Ārya Samājs in the country, was established in 1937 and registered under the friendly societies ordinance in 1938. A building to house the headquarters of the League was also established. Pandit Usharbudh Arya arrived in 1955, and notably established the youth organization Ārya Vīr Dāl. Arya's Ashram was established at the Mahaicony River. The then Burnham Government viewed the Vid Dal movement and Pandit Arya as paramilitary efforts to bolster the East Indians in Guyana, and asked Pandit Arya to leave Guyana.

=== Consolidation ===
In 1975, the Ārya Samāj in Guyana had 40,000 members, with 35 Ārya Samāj branches affiliated with the American Aryan League. In 1968, the American Aryan League assumed the name Guyana Arya Pratinidhi Sabha. In 1969, this organisation received official recognition from the Forbes Burnham government of the new independent state of Guyana. A council of priests, Arya Pracharak Mandal, ensured that the activities of the Samaj were conducted in accordance with the scriptures. In 1973, the Ārya Vīr Dāl was revived and received the name "Guyana Aryan Youth League". It played a significant role in organising weekly services. The American Aryan League also ran a primary and a post-primary school.

=== Political problems and division ===
In the 1970s, the People's National Congress (PNC) led by Forbes Burnham was seen as increasingly dictatorial and anti-East Indian. A majority of East Indians in Guyana and those in the Arya Samaj movement sided with the People's Progressive Party (PPP) led by Cheddi Jagan. Those who did not were seen as subversive by the Arya Samajists in Berbice, especially when Burnham was embraced by a few leaders of the then American Aryan League.

The Berbice Central Arya Samaj (BCA) was formed in an effort to bring together all the Arya Samaj groups in Berbice and was seen as embracing Pandit Usharbudh Arya. The BCA, was led by Pandit Budhram Mahadeo CCH, Lawyer Powaroo (Bengal Village), Pt Durga (Skeldon), Mahashay Raghubeer (64 Village), Gajadhar Singh (New Amsterdam), Dwarka Nauth (Crabwood Creek), Mahashay Kirpaul (Black Bush Polder), Pandita Singh (78 Village), Pt Manohar (71 Village), Mataji Sugrim (78 Village), and many others. Pandit Arya launched and led the first Vir Dal camp at No 71 Village in Berbice.

The split of the Arya Samaj in Guyana followed political lines. The advent of forced National Service in Guyana brought the split to a head when a few Arya Samaj leaders backed the National Service in exchange for position and scholarships. The Guyana National Service was vehemently opposed by the traditional leaders who refused to let women go to the unfamiliar National Service centres in the forested regions of the interior of Guyana. Pandits Budhram Mahadeo CCH, and Pandit Ramlall (who later migrated to the USA) led the Arya Samaj in condemning the National Service. Many East Indian women opted to refrain from university education rather than undertake the National Service.

In the late 1970s, the Berbice Central Arya Samaj called a unification meeting of the Arya Pratinidhi Sabha and the American Aryan League. This led to the formation of the Guyana Central Arya Samaj that has since chosen to remain independent of political association.

== Current status ==
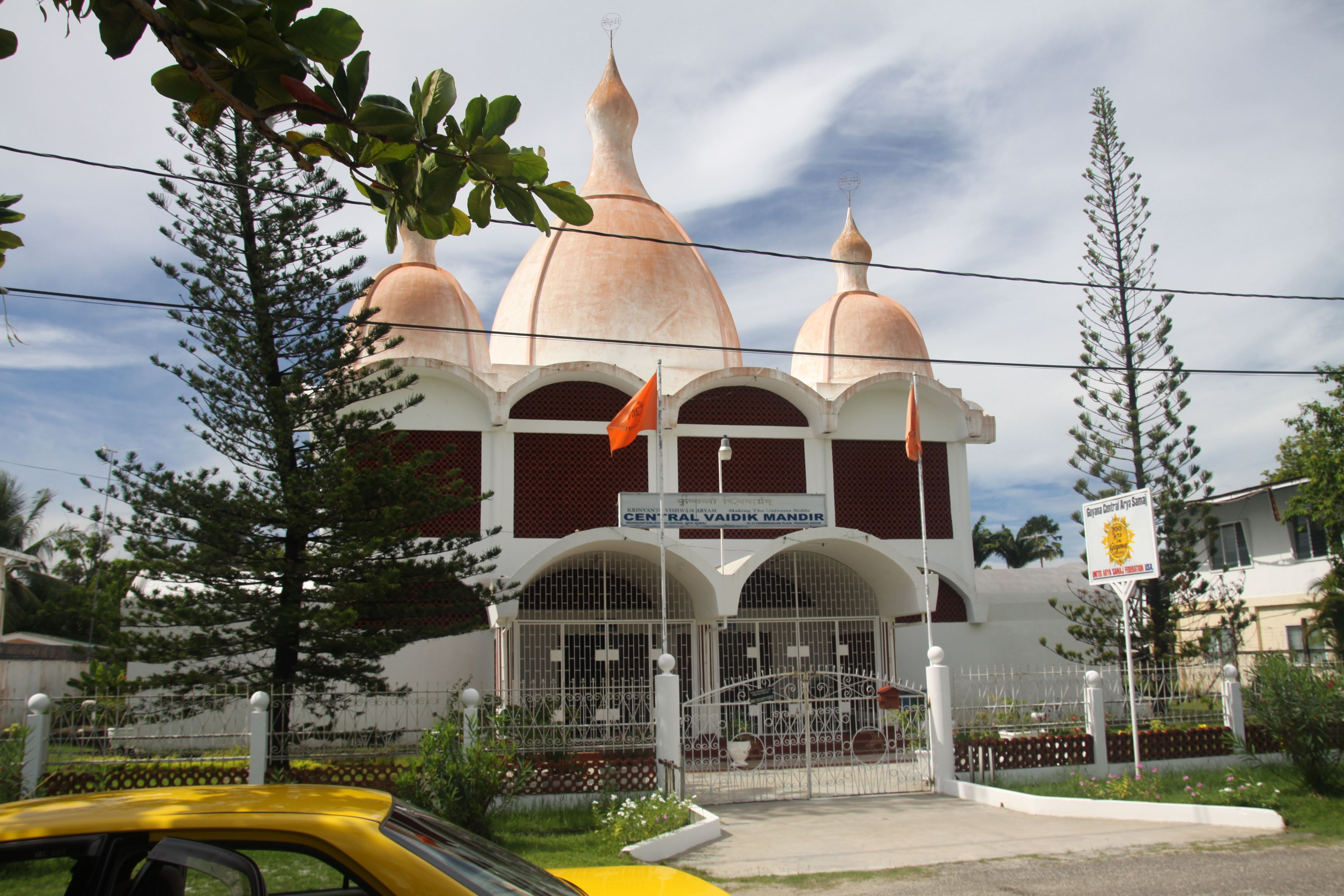

Today, the Guyana Central Arya Samaj (GCAS) is the umbrella organisation of all Ārya Samājīs in Guyana and is led by the children of those who were the leaders of the 1970s. In 2018, the executives of the GCAS include General President Dr Yog Mahadeo, General Secretary Aruna Lall, Treasurer Chaman Poonai, VP Seukumar Harikishun, Amy Seedan, Renuka Mahadeo, Rupanie Bissoondial, and Anil Naraine.

The Regional Branches continue their activities with the various mandirs across the country. The Berbice Central Arya Samaj is led by Dr Vishwa Mahadeo, Matajis Mando, Brahash, and Shanta. The East Demerara Arya Samaj is headed by Pandit Seukumar Harikishun, Pandit Chaman Lall Poonai and Mataji Shakuntala. The West Demerara Arya Samaj is led by Pandita Dhanrajie Haimraj and others. Dr Satish Prakash also contributes annual camps and sermons to Arya Samaj in Guyana.

The Guyana Central Arya Samaj took over the headquarters of the Guyana Arya Pratinidhi Sabha and has 29 affiliated Ārya Samāj branches and ten associated Ārya Samāj branches all over Guyana.

== See also ==
- List of Hindu temples outside India
- List of large Hindu temples
- Arya Samaj Pandit Ji
- Lists of Hindu temples by country
- Arya Samaj Marriage Helpline
