= Arya Samaj in Uganda =

AUM or OM is considered by the Arya Samaj to be the highest and most proper name of God.

Arya Samaj was established in Uganda in 1908 by Pandit Purnanand. In 1929 a large building was constructed by the Samaj. The Uganda Arya Samaj was one of the most active in East Africa until the political revolution led by Idi Amin forced all the people of Indian origin to leave Uganda and the work of Arya Samaj came to an end.
