= Bhawani Dayal Sannyasi =

South African editor

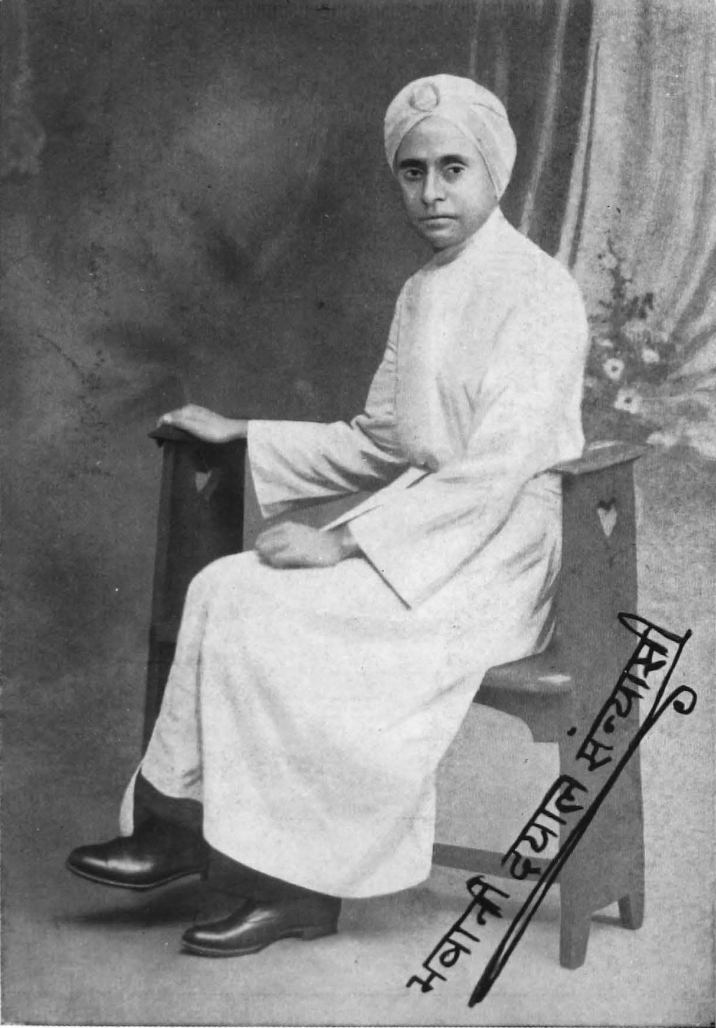
- Born: Bhawani Dayal; 10 September 1892; Johannesburg, Transvaal (present-day South Africa)
- Died: 9 May 1950 (aged 57)
- Occupation: Editor
- Spouse: Jagrani Devi (m. 1910; died 1922)

Bhawani Dayal later Bhawani Dayal Sanyasi (10 September 1892 – 9 May 1950) was a wealthy South African of Indian descent, an activist for Indians in South Africa and an editor of various India-related newsletters such as the Pravasi. He collaborated with Mohandas Gandhi, and represented the South African Indians at the Indian National Congress while also being active in the Arya Samaj, the propagation of the Hindi language and in other Indian diaspora movements of the time. He was accepted as a person who renounced worldly pleasures as a sanyasi giving him the later name and the prefix Swami.

== Biography ==
Dayal came from a family that had initially moved from Bahuara, Ara district, Bihar as indentured labourers to Transvaal. His father Babu Jairam Singh and Mohini Devi became free citizens in 1884 and settled in Johannesburg, where Dayal was born. Babu Jairam Singh had been influenced by Gandhi. Dayal was educated in English, in the St Cyprian's and Wesleyan Methodist Schools. In 1899, Mohini Devi died and the Anglo-Boer war led the family to move from Johannesburg to Durban, sometimes moving to places like Chikakoti, Buttery Place and Cato Manor. He was sent to India in 1904 travelling and studying. He was married in 1910 to Jagrani Devi, daughter of Babu Ram Narayan Rai, a zamindar in Sakhra. In 1912 he returned to South Africa with his wife, his infant son and along with his brother and brother's wife. He was detained aboard the SS Palamcotta on arrival by immigration officials. The case was finally successfully argued in their favour by Henry Polak.

Dayal joined Gandhi in the Passive Resistance movement of 1913. In 1919, Dayal represented the South African Indians at the Amritsar session of the Indian National Congress. In 1922, his wife Jagrani Devi died and Dayal visited India again, attending the Congress session at Gaya. Dayal founded a journal called Hindi and protested a British scheme in 1921 to move ("repatriate") Indians to British Guiana. Dayal founded a Pravasi Bhawan in his home village at Bahuara, Bihar with a library and school in 1926–27. For his achievement he was inducted as a Sanyasi (adding it to his name and also prefixing Swami) on the first anniversary of the Bhawan on April 10, 1927, with vedic rituals. In 1930 he took part in Gandhi's Satyagraha protests in India and was booked for seditious speeches (including those delivered by him in Fiji) on March 29. In Patna he edited the journal Aryavarta. In 1932 he went back to South Africa. In 1934 he was invited to meet Prince George who visited Durban, and was later appointed Commissioner of Oaths for the Durban District.
