= Sudhakar Chaturvedi =

Indian scholar

Pandit Sudhakar Chaturvedi
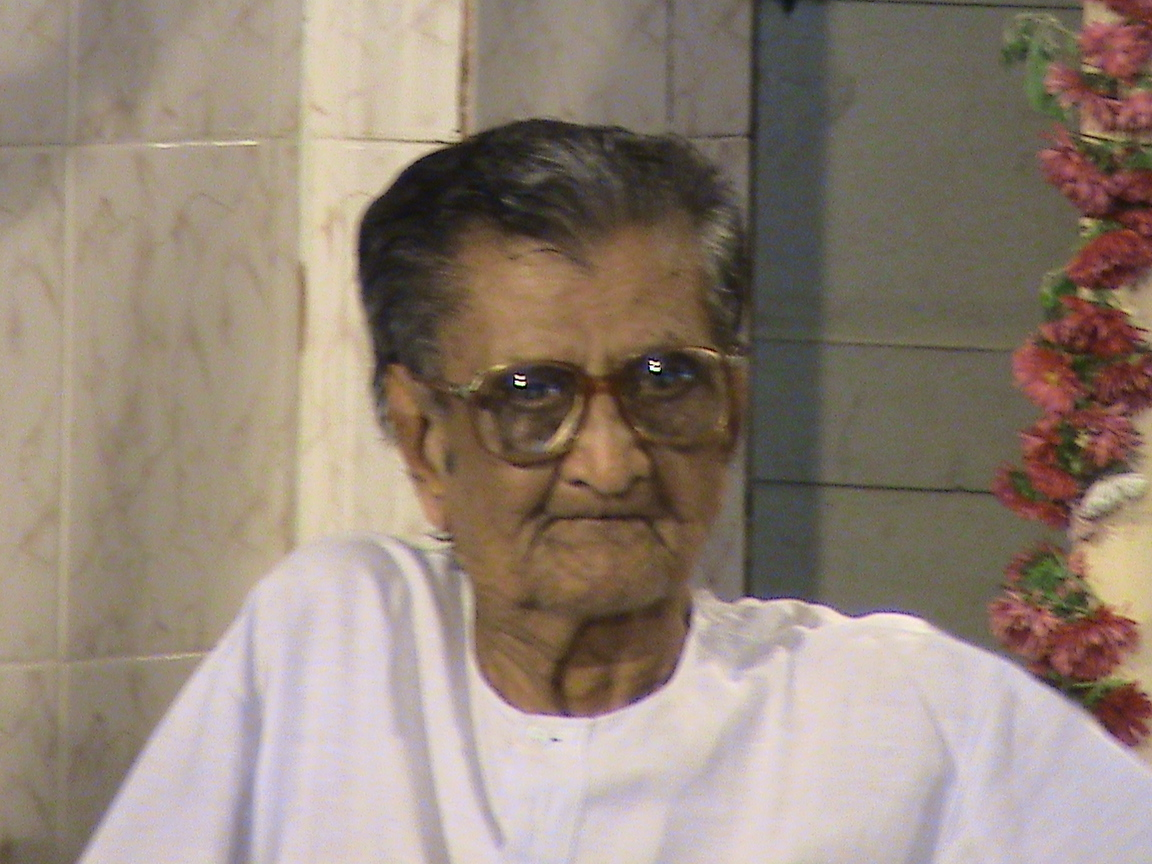
- Chaturvedi in 2008
- Born: Sudhakar Krishna Rao; 20 April 1897 (claimed); Bangalore, Kingdom of Mysore, India
- Died: 27 February 2020; Bangalore, Karnataka, India
- Known for: Contributions to Indology, Supercentenarian status

Pandit Sudhakar Chaturvedi (died 27 February 2020) was an Indian independence activist, Vedic scholar, Indologist, and claimed supercentenarian. At the claimed age of 122 years, 313 days, some Indian newspapers reported him as the oldest Indian ever.

== Biography ==
=== Early life ===
Chaturvedi was reportedly born on 20 April 1897 in Bangalore, Karnataka, British India (or in Kyatsandra in Tumkur district, Karnataka state according to one report). One report also claimed an age of 121 in 2011, which would put his birth in 1890. He learned all the Shastras and Vedas in a traditional Gurukul Kangri University in Haridwar. He was inspired by the life of Maharshi Dayananda Saraswati at young age and embraced Arya Samaj and its teachings for the rest of his life.

=== Freedom struggle and Vedic scholarship ===
Chaturvedi was given his title "Chaturvedi", which literally means "master of the four Vedas," for his knowledge of the Vedas. He was a disciple of Swami Shraddhanand at Gurukul Kangri in Haridwar, where he got his Veda Vachaspati degree (equivalent to a postgraduate degree).

Chaturvedi was a contemporary of Mahatma Gandhi, whom he first met when studying the Vedas in a Gurukula in northern India. Subsequently, he became an ardent follower of Gandhian methods. He was a witness to many events in the Indian independence movement, including being an eyewitness to the 1919 Jallianwala Bagh massacre. He was known as Gandhi's Postman, as he took down and delivered letters dictated by Gandhi addressed to the Viceroys or Governors-General. Gandhi called him 'Karnataki'. He lost the use of his right arm in 1938 while travelling with Gandhi, when the railwayman detached the last three compartments of the train as it was struggling to climb uphill. He took part in the freedom struggle and was arrested at least 31 times during the freedom struggle, landing in prisons all over the country from Peshawar to Vellore.

He was offered the post of minister in the old Mysore state by Sardar Vallabhbhai Patel, which he turned down. He also campaigned for the unification of the state.

=== Later life ===
He continued his inspiration that he took from the life of Maharshi Dayanand Saraswati of the Arya Samaj. He adopted a man named Arya Mitra as his son, and had three grandchildren. He never married:

"My youth was spent in the struggle. By the time we got freedom [in 1947], I was over 50 years. Who would give me a girl then?"

Chaturvedi was the first teacher of Sri Sri Ravi Shankar. In 2011 he took part in the India Against Corruption campaign. He lived in Jayanagar, Bangalore, Karnataka, India and in 2010 stated he was still working for eight hours every day. This included an hour-long lecture he gave on the Vedas every Saturday. He woke up at 3 am or 3:30, going to bed by 7 pm. He advised people to "follow the instructions in the Vedas and a happy life awaits you." He practiced a strict vegetarian diet. He said he wanted to live to 300.

== Awards ==
He was honoured by Motilal Banarsidass for his contributions to Indology, when it celebrated its centenary in 2003. The Karnataka Sahitya Anuvada Academy gave him an honorary award for 2007–2008. In 2009 he was given a "Socio-Economic Development Teacher Award", by the Sri Kashi Sesha Sastri Charitable Trust. He was honoured by his alma mater, Gurukul Kangri University, in 2010. In 2010 he was given a "Living Legend" Award by IDL Foundation at a public function where he pledged to donate his eyes. In March 2011 he was gifted a wheelchair by the IDL Foundation, sponsored by Santosh Hegde. On Republic Day in 2010, he was felicitated by the Governor of Karnataka.

== Books authored ==
Chaturvedi wrote over 40 books in the Kannada language and, as of 2008, was working on the publication of Vedic texts in 20 volumes. He was also announced in 2002 to be heading a project of the Arya Samaj to publish a 30,000-page treatise in Kannada on Veda Bhashya, and by 2009, three of the four Vedas and six volumes of the Rig Veda were released.

He was the moving spirit behind the Bangalore Arya Samaj, which published the Kannada monthly magazine Veda Taranga.

Among his books were:

- A translation of the book Satyarth Prakash of Maharshi Dayanand Saraswati of Arya Samaj into Kannada (ಸತ್ಯಾರ್ಥ ಪ್ರಕಾಶ)
- Rashtra Purusha Yogiraja Maharshi Dayananda Saraswati (ರಾಷ್ಟ್ರ ಪುರುಷ ಯೋಗಿರಾಜ ಮಹರ್ಷಿ ದಯಾನಂದ ಸರಸ್ವತಿ) (A Biography of Maharshi Dayanand Saraswati of Arya Samaj)
- Vedokta Jeevana Patha (ವೇದೋಕ್ತ ಜೀವನ ಪಥ)
- Yoga Pradeepa (ಯೋಗ ಪ್ರದೀಪ)
- Adarsha Manava (ಆದರ್ಶ ಮಾನವ)
- Rigveda Darshana (ಋಗ್ವೇದ ದರ್ಶನ)
- Murtipooje Jignase? (ಮೂರ್ತಿಪೂಜೆ ಜಿಜ್ಞಾಸೆ?)
- Janmagata Jati Paddhati Veda Virodhi (ಜನ್ಮಗತ ಜಾತಿ ಪದ್ಧತಿ ವೇದ ವಿರೋಧಿ)
- Grace and Glory of Vedic Dharma (English)
- Shanti Mattu Sowbhagya (ಶಾಂತಿ ಮತ್ತು ಸೌಭಾಗ್ಯ)
- Vaidika Vivaha Samskara Vidhi (ವೈದಿಕ ವಿವಾಹ ಸಂಸ್ಕಾರವಿಧಿ)
- Bhagawan Sri Ramachandra (ಭಗವಾನ್ ಶ್ರೀರಾಮಚಂದ್ರ)
- Vedamaata Gayatri (ವೇದಮಾತಾ ಗಾಯತ್ರೀ)
- Upanishad Bhashya (ಉಪನಿಷದ್ ಭಾಷ್ಯ)
- Halavu Nenapugalu (ಹಲವು ನೆನಪುಗಳು)

These and many of his books are published by Arya Samaj, VV Puram, Bengaluru, Karnataka, India.

The book 'Halavu Nenapugalu' alone was published by Pustak Shaki Publications in Bengaluru.

== See also ==
- Longevity claims
