= Arya Samaj in Mozambique =

Hindu religious organization in Mozambique

Arya Samaj
- AUM or OM is considered by the Arya Samaj to be the highest and most proper name of God.
- Founded: 1933
- Founded at: Mozambique
- Type: Religious organization
- Purpose: Spread of Vedic teachings
- Region served: Mozambique
- Key people: Bhawani Dayal

Arya Samaj was formed in Mozambique following the visit by Arya Samaji preacher, Bhawani Dayal, when Hindus in the capital, Lourenço Marques, formed the Bharat Sabha in 1933, on the basis of Vedic teachings. A Veda Mandir (temple) was built in 1937 and many Arya Samaji preachers visited the Mandir in subsequent years.

In 1962, relations between India and Portugal was strained due to India's annexation of Goa, a Portuguese territory on the sub-continent. Indians in overseas Portuguese territories were victimised and most had to leave these colonies. Thus the work of Arya Samj in Mozambique came to an end.
