= Arya Samaj in Tanzania =

AUM or OM is considered by the Arya Samaj to be the highest and most proper name of God.

Arya Samaj in Tanzania had been in existence since the early 1900s and prior to independence the whole of East Africa was served by a single Arya Samaj. After independence a separate Pratinidhi Sabha was formed in Tanzania on 19 July 1974.

== History ==
Arya Samaj had initially been established in Dar-es-Salaam by Karsandas Dwarikadas. The Arya Samaj, thanks to generous donation by its supporters, constructed a building in the city. A school for girls was established which provided instruction in English, Hindi and Gujarati which later became the Dayanand Anglo Vedic (DAV) Secondary School. Vedic preachers from India, who toured Africa, also stopped over in Dar-es-Salaam. Other Arya Samajs were established in Tabora, Mwanza and Tanga.

== Arya Samaj in Tanga ==
The Arya Samaj of Tanga was formally established on 2 February 1947. Weekly prayer meetings were held and a building was erected in the name of the Samaj. The Arya Samaj also provided Hindi education for which a number of people provided free service. The Samaj supported the "Dayanand Home" in Nairobi and provided scholarships to deserving students. The Samaj has maintained a library of books in English, Hindi and Gujarati. The Arya Samaj in Tanga has worked in close cooperation with other Hindu organisations in the region.

== Arya Samaj in Zanzibar ==
The Arya Samaj was established in Zanzibar in 1907. The Samaj constructed a large building and for fifty years took over the responsibility for the religious, cultural and educational activities among the Hindus in Zanzibar. It built a girls' school and a library. Regular prayer meetings were held and Hindu festivals celebrated. After 1960, political developments led to many Indians leaving the islands and at present there are only a few Hindu families left.
