= Swami Murugesu =

Swami R. K. Murugesu
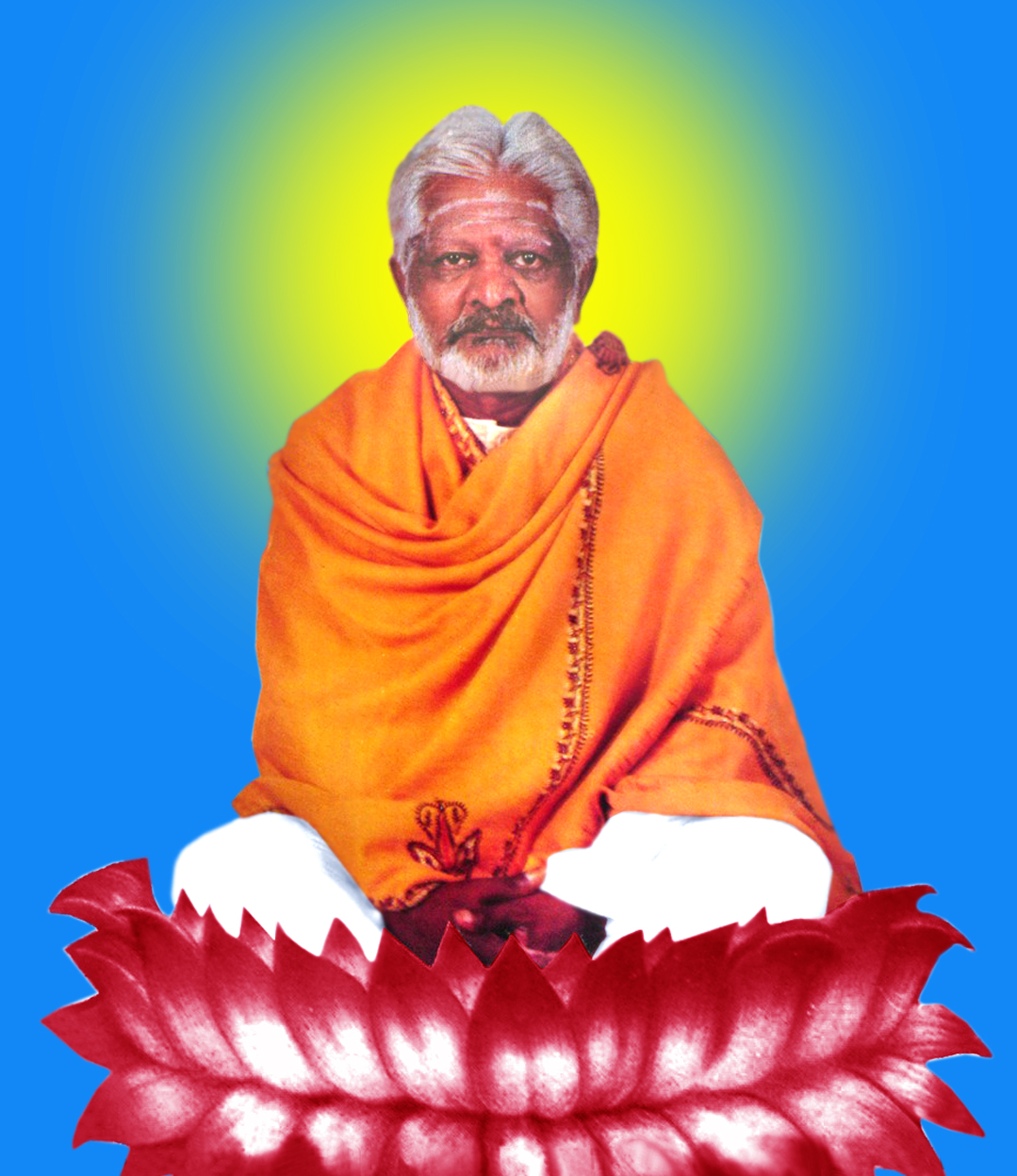
- Born: 26 October 1933; Kandy, Sri Lanka
- Died: 24 September 2007 (aged 73); Chennai, Tamil Nadu, India
- Resting place: Gayathri Mandir, Nuwara Eliya, Sri Lanka
- Occupations: Author, Spiritual Teacher
- Known for: Spiritual Teachings

Swami Raman Kalimuthu Murugesu was a Gayathri Siddhar and the creator of the Sri Lankatheeswara temple in Nuwara Eliya.

== Early life ==
Raman Kalimuthu Murugesu was born in a poverty-stricken household on 26 October 1933. Since his family was so poor, he had to begin working as a laborer in the fields at the age of 12. It was at that time in his life that he was presented with a book of mantras for Lord Ganesha, given to him by a great Mahatma. Murugesu started to chant regularly.

== Creation of the Sri Lankatheeswara temple ==
Gayathri Siddhar Swami Murugesu is the founder of Sri Lankatheeswarar temple in 1974 with his sole efforts, and had counted thousands of devotees all over the world and hundreds of admirers including leading figures within the country and abroad, among whom were Prime Ministers and others, visiting this temple and getting his blessings, who had tirelessly worked for peace and amity all over the world. The Sri Lankatheeswarar temple is the first and the foremost temple built for Gayathri Amman in Sri Lanka, and the Shiva Lingham installed in this temple was brought from the holy river Narmada by Sri Sivabalayogi Maharaj.

This temple has showered with endless blessings of Siddhars especially Gayathri Siddhar Swami Murugesu. Swami MurugesuHe had an ashram next to the temple and lived next to the ashram. There was also a block of sandy steps leading up to a big hall, where Murugesu conducted yagnas and did rituals for Poya day. In the temple there was a big Shivalingam, that would have an abishekam every month. There is a black statue of Goddess Gayathri is there opposite to the temple.

== Guru ==
Murugesu went to India and admitted to Sri Kannaiya Yogis Ashram and became his disciple. There he researched in to Gayatri Mantra and written many books based on his researches. Hence he is also known as Gayathri Siddha by his disciples.

== Disciples ==
Many flocked to the ashram and became Murugesu's disciples. One of them was Swami Shankarananda Maharajji who runs the Gayathri Peedam in South Africa, which was consecrated personally by Swami Murugesu in 1998. Another disciple is Swami Radhakrishnan who runs a Meditation centre in Germany and the Gayathri Meditation is held there.

== Mahasamadhi ==
Swami Murugesu decided to enter into mahasamadhi to release his soul from the perishable body and attained "Jeevan Mukthi" on 24 September 2007 in India and his samadhi was laid in the Gayathri Mandir of the Sri Lankatheeswarar temple. Now and always his divine pisciower guides the disciples and devotees which is felt by them day to day. Now, according to guru's guidance the establishment of temple for 108 "Suyambu" linghams are held and hope to have a kumbhabhiseham for that in near future. A samadhi shrine containing some of Swami Murugesu's possessions is also installed in the South Africa branch.

== Bibliography ==
- The Great Science and Power of Gayathri (available in English from http://www.blurb.com/bookstore/detail/1598310)
- Gayathri Mantra Mahimai (Tamil)

== Other publications ==
Murugesu published many other books his Guru, Kanniah Yogi, had written, in Tamil. Some of them were:

Gayathri Geeta

Gayathri Ramayanam

Yaga Vignyanam

Gayathri Gupta Vignyanam

Velliaymurai Yogapayitchee
