= Arya Samaj in Ghana =

AUM or OM is considered by the Arya Samaj to be the highest and most proper name of God.

Arya Samaj was established in Ghana in August 1986 by Pandit Wreston Charles Ankoh when he founded the Arya Vedic Mission in Accra. Ankoh was the first black African to be trained as a Vedic priest in Durban, South Africa. Under the guidance of Pandit Nardev Vedaalankarji, he completing his studies in Vedic knowledge, Vedic mantras and yoga philosophy. Initially the Mission consisted of five members from African families, who gathered for weekly satsangs, yagnas and philosophical study.

From humble beginnings, the Ghana Arya Vedic Mission has grown dramatically, and broadcasts the Samaj's Hindu teachings across Ghana through public speaking, satsangs and literature. On the back of his success in Ghana, Ankoh is negotiating to begin a mission in neighboring Nigeria. Ankoh's success is due to maintaining the integrity of the Vedic rituals and chants, while allowing a reconciliation of Indian customs and traditional Ghanaian cultural practices. For marriages, the bride may dress in Ghanaian fashion. Members often keep their Ghanaian ancestral name during the namakarana (name-giving sacrament). Vegetarianism and yoga practice are taught and encouraged, and the Ghana youth excel at hatha yoga postures.
