= Ganga Prasad Upadhyaya =

Pundit Ganga Prasad Upadhyaya (1871-1968) was an Arya Samaji writer. He served as professor of Meerut College at Allahabad University and as chief judge at Tehri, Garhwal District, from which post he retired to serve the Arya Samaj full-time. Pandit Gangaprasad had two sons Jyoti Swarup and Shanti Swarup from his first wife Prema Devi and post her demise he married Narayani Devi from whom he had three sons and one daughter, Kanti Swarup, Prakash Swarup, Jadish Swarup and Sushila Swarup.

Jyoti Swarup family are Harish Chandra Rastogi, Satish Rastogi, Madhavi Rastogi, Kusum Garg, Hem Garg, Arati Kumar and Shefali Jhalani.

Upadhyaya is notable for producing anti-Christian tracts in the context of the Indian independence struggle under the British Raj and the formative years of the 1947 Republic of India; these include "The Arya Samaj and Christianity" (Allahabad, 1941, 1965) and "Christianity in India" (1956). In The Fountainhead of Religion, he postulates a "common origin from the Vedas" for all world religions.

Bibliography

- 1911, The Fountainhead of Religion: A Comparative Study of the Principal Religions of the World and a Manifestation of Their Common Origin from the Vedas
- 1916, Problems of the Universe
- 1930, The Arya Samaj & Hinduism
- 1930, Vedic Womanhood
- 1930, Vedic View of Life
- 1933, Arya Samaj & Islam
- 1934, Inner Man & Other Lectures on Arya Philosophy
- 1939, I and My God
- 1939, Swami Dayanand's Contribution to Hindu Solidarity
- 1940, The Origin, Scope and Mission of the Arya Samaj
- 1940, Pamphlets on the Arya Samaj
- 1941, The Arya Samaj and Christianity, extended editions 1956, 1965
- 1947, Landmarks of Svami Dayanand's Teachings
- 1950, A Catechism of the Elementary Teachings of Hinduism
- 1953, The Caste System: Its Origin and Growth; Its Social Evils and Their Remedies
- 1955, Philosophy of Dayananda
- 1956, Social Reconstruction by Buddha and Dayananda
- 1957, Reason & Religion
- 1962, Vedic Culture
