= Sukama Acharya =

Indian social worker

- Born: 15 October 1935; Mayurbhanj, Odisha, India
- Occupation(s): Educator, social worker
- Known for: Promoting girls' education
- Awards: Padma Shri (2023)

Sukama Acharya (born 15 October 1945) is an Indian educator and social worker known for her efforts in promoting girls' education in Haryana, India. She is the head of Kanya Gurukul in Rohtak, where she has provided free education to girls from underprivileged backgrounds for over 40 years.

== Early life ==
Sukama Acharya was born on 15 October 1945 in Rohtak, Haryana, India. She pursued her education with a focus on traditional Indian values and later earned a doctorate. Choosing to remain unmarried, she dedicated her life to education and social work.

== Career ==
Acharya founded Kanya Gurukul in Rohtak, an institution dedicated to educating girls who lack access to education due to poverty or social barriers. The gurukul offers free education, combining Vedic teachings with modern subjects. She has also supported married women by encouraging their education and independence.

== Awards ==
In 2023, Acharya received the Padma Shri, India’s fourth-highest civilian honor, for her contributions to education and social work.
