= Satyarth Prakash =

1875 book by Dayanand Saraswati

Satyarth Prakash (The Light of Truth)
- Author: Swami Dayananda Saraswati
- Language: Hindi
- Publisher: Star Press Benares
- Publication date: 1875
- Publication place: India

Satyarth Prakash (Hindi: सत्यार्थ प्रकाश; Satyārth Prakāś; lit. 'The Light of Truth') is an 1875 book written originally in Hindi by Dayananda Saraswati, a religious and social reformer and the founder of Arya Samaj. The book was subsequently revised by Dayanada Saraswati in 1882 and has been translated into more than 20 languages including Sanskrit and foreign languages, including English, French, German, Swahili, Arabic and Chinese. The major portion of the book is dedicated to laying down the reformist advocacy of Dayanada Saraswati with the last four chapters making a case for comparative study of different religious faiths.

Some of the topics in the Satyarth Prakash include worship of one god, explanation of the main principles of the Vedas, the relationship between religion and science and between devotion and intellect, elimination of the caste system and critical analysis of different religious beliefs and other religions in light of the Vedas, for the strengthening of society, eradication of superstitions, false notions and meaningless customs, shunning narrow-mindedness and promoting the brotherhood of man.

== Contents ==
The book contains fourteen chapters.

Chapter	Content
1	Chapter 1 is an exposition of “Om” and other names of God.
2	Chapter 2 provides guidance on the upbringing of children.
3	Chapter 3 explains the life of Brahmacarya (bachelor), the duties and qualifications of scholars and teachers, good and bad books and the scheme of studies.
4	Chapter 4 is about marriage and married life.
5	Chapter 5 is about giving up materialism and starting to carry out community service.
6	Chapter 6 is about science of government.
7	Chapter 7 is about Veda and God.
8	Chapter 8 deals with Creation, Sustenance and Dissolution of the Universe.
9	Chapter 9 deals with knowledge and ignorance, and liberation and bondage.
10	Chapter 10 deals with desirable and undesirable conduct and permissible and forbidden diet.
11	Chapter 11 contains criticism of the various religions and sects prevailing in India.
12	Chapter 12 deals with the Charvaka, Buddhism and Jainism.
13	Chapter 13 deals with Christianity.
14	Chapter 14 deals with Islam.

== Editions ==
The book was originally written in Hindi by Maharshi Dayanand Saraswati in 1875. After detecting omissions, language and printing mistakes in the first edition, after making corrections at Israr Mahal inside Ramapur at Benares, he published a second revised edition in Samvat 1939 (1882–1883 CE). The book has been translated into twenty-four different languages. Navlakha Mahal is presently the office of Shrimad Dayanand Satyarth Prakash Nyas, which after detecting in 2004 that the book has been printed by many unauthorised entities in different versions, appointed an authentication committee of Vedic scholars, and started to publish authenticated version of the book.

No.	Language	Author / Translator	Publication year
1	Hindi	Dayanand Saraswati	1875 (1st edition, Benares), 1882 (2nd edition)
2	English (4 translations by different scholars)	1. Dr. Chiranjiva Bharadwaja, 2. Master Durga Prasad, 3. Pt. Ganga Prasad Upadhyay, 4. Vandemataram Ramachandra Rao	1. 1906, 2. 1908, 3. 1946, 4. 1988
3	Sanskrit	Pandit Shankardev Pathak	1924
4	Urdu	1. Atmaram Amritsari, Bhakt Raimal and Naunihal, 2. Jivandas, 3. Pt. Chamupati, 4. Mehta Radhakrishna	1. 1898, 2. 1899, 3. 1939, 4. 1905
5	Punjabi	Atmaram Amritsari	1899
6	Gujarati	1. Mancha Shankar and Jaishankar Dvivedi, 2. Mayashankar Sharma, 3.Dilip Vedalankar	1. 1905, 2. 1926, 3. 1994
7	Sindhi	Jivanlal Arya	1912
8	Bengali	1. Motilal Bhattacharya, 2. Shankar Nath, 3. Gaurmohandev Verman	1. 1901, 2. 1911, 3. ???
9	Marathi	1. Shridas Vidyarthi, 2. Shripad Damodar Satwalekar, 3. Snatak Satyavrat, 4. Shripad Joshi	1. 1907, 2. 1926, 3. 1932, 4. 1990
10	Tamil	1. M. R Jambunathan, 2. Kannaiya, 3. Shuddhananda Bharati	1. 1926, 2. 1935, 3. 1974
11	Telugu	1. A. Somanathan Rao, 2. Pt. Gopadev Sastry	1. 1933, 2. ???
12	Malayalam	1. Brahmachari Lakshman (Originally by Pt. Vedabandhu Sharma), 2. Acharya Narendra Bhooshan	1. 1933, 2. 1978
13	Kannada	1. Bhaskar Pant, 2. Satyapal Snatak, 3. Sudhakar Chaturvedi	1. 1932, 2. 1955, 3. 1974
14	Nepali	Dilusingh Rai	1879
15	German	1. Dr. Daulatram Devgram, Borikhel Mianwali, 2. Arya Divakar	1. 1930, 2. 1983
16	Swahili	???	???
17	Odia	1. Shrivatsa Panda, 2. Lakshminarayan Shastri	1. 1927, 2. 1973
18	Assamese	Parmeshwar Koti	1975
19	Arabic	Kalicharan Sharma	???
20	Burmese	Kittima	???
21	Chinese	Dr. Chau	1958
22	Thai	???	???
23	French	Lui Morin	1940
24	Kumaoni and Garhwali	Virbhadra Sati	???

== Reception and criticism ==
S. Rangaswami Iyengar praised the book, saying that "It contains the wholly rationalistic view of the Vedic religion."

Satyartha Prakash was banned in some Indian princely states and in the Sind Province of British India (now Sindh, Pakistan) in 1944; and it remains banned in Sindh. This ban was condemned by Mahatma Gandhi.

In 2008 two Indian Muslims, Usman Ghani and Mohammad Khalil Khan of Sadar Bazar, Delhi, following the fatwa of Mufti Mukarram Ahmed, the Imam of Fatehpuri Masjid in Delhi, urged the Delhi High Court to ban Satyarth Prakash. However, the court dismissed the petition and commented "A suit by Hindus against the Quran or by Muslims against Gita or Satyarth Prakash claiming relief ... are in fact, meant to play mischief in the society."

== See also ==
- Vedic creationism
