= Dayananda Saraswati =

Indian philosopher and socio-religious reformer (1824–1883)

Maharshi Swami Dayananda Saraswati
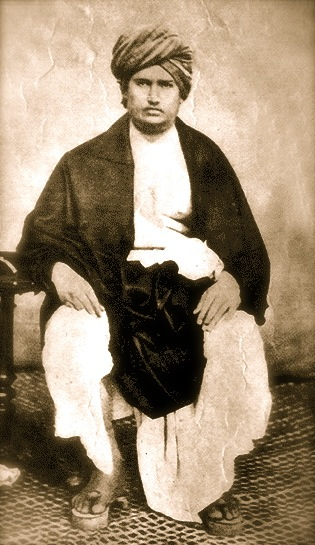

Personal life
- Born: Mool Shankar Tiwari; 12 February 1824 Tankara, Morvi State, British India (present-day Gujarat, India)
- Died: 30 October 1883 (aged 59) Ajmer, Ajmer-Merwara, British India (present-day Rajasthan, India)
- Notable work: Satyarth Prakash (1875)

Religious life
- Religion: Hinduism
- Founder of: Arya Samaj
- Philosophy: Vedic

Religious career
- Teacher: Virajanand Dandeesha
- Influenced by: Kanada, Yāska, Kashyapa, Patanjali, Pāṇini, Kapila, Badarayana
- Influenced: Madam Cama, Pandit Lekh Ram, Swami Shraddhanand, Shyamji Krishna Varma, Vinayak Damodar Savarkar, Lala Hardayal, Madan Lal Dhingra, Ram Prasad Bismil, Mahadev Govind Ranade, Mahatma Hansraj, Lala Lajpat Rai and others

Quotation

There are undoubtedly many learned men among the followers of every religion. They should free themselves from prejudice, accept the universal truths – that is those truths that are to be found alike in all religions and are of universal application, reject all things in which the various religions differ and treat each other lovingly, it will be greatly to the advantage of the world.

Dayanand Saraswati born Mool Shankar Tiwari (12 February 1824 – 30 October 1883), was a Hindu philosopher, social leader and founder of the Arya Samaj, a reform movement of Hinduism. His book Satyarth Prakash has remained one of the influential texts on the philosophy of the Vedas and clarifications of various ideas and duties of human beings. He was the first to give the call for Swaraj as "India for Indians" in 1876. The word swaraj in the modern political sense, however, does not appear in his written communications. Denouncing the idolatry and ritualistic worship, he worked towards reviving Vedic religion. Subsequently, the philosopher and President of India, Sarvepalli Radhakrishnan, addressed him one of the "makers of Modern India", as did Sri Aurobindo.

Those who were influenced by and followed Dayananda included Chaudhary Charan Singh, Madam Cama, Pandit Lekh Ram, Swami Shraddhanand, Shyamji Krishna Varma, Kishan Singh, Bhagat Singh, Vinayak Damodar Savarkar, Bhai Parmanand, Lala Hardayal, Madan Lal Dhingra, Ram Prasad Bismil, Mahadev Govind Ranade, Ashfaqullah Khan, Mahatma Hansraj, Lala Lajpat Rai, Yogmaya Neupane, Vallabhbhai Patel and others.

He was a sannyasi (ascetic) from childhood and a scholar. He believed in the infallible authority of the Vedas. Dayananda advocated the doctrines of karma and reincarnation. He emphasised the Vedic ideals of brahmacharya, including celibacy and devotion to God.

Among Dayananda's contributions were his opposition to untouchability, promotion of the equal rights for women, and commentary on the Vedas from Vedic Sanskrit in Sanskrit as well as in Hindi.

== Early life ==
Dayananda Saraswati was born on the 10th day of waning moon in the month of Purnimanta Phalguna (12 February 1824) on the tithi to an Indian Hindu Brahmin family in Tankara, Kathiawar region (now Morbi district of Gujarat). He belonged to the Audichya Brahmin sub-division. His original name was Mool Shankar Tiwari, because he was born in Dhanu Rashi and Mul Nakshatra. His father's name was Karshanji Lalji Tiwari, and his mother was Yashodabai.

When he was eight years old, his Yajnopavita Sanskara ceremony was performed, marking his entry into formal education. His father was devotee of Shiva and taught him the ways to worship Shiva. He also learnt the importance of keeping fasts. On the occasion of Shivratri, Dayananda sat awake the whole night in obedience to Shiva. During one of these fasts, he saw a mouse eating the offerings and running over the idol's body. After seeing this, he questioned that if Shiva could not defend himself against a mouse, then how could he be the saviour of the world.

The deaths of his younger sister and his uncle from cholera led Dayananda to ponder the meaning of life and death. He began asking questions about it to his parents and they were much worried by this. He was engaged in his early teens, but he decided marriage was not for him and ran away from home in 1846.

Between 1845 and 1869, Dayanand travelled extensively across India as a wandering ascetic. During this period, he visited forests, pilgrimage centres, and retreats in the Himalayas, dedicating himself to spiritual study and meditation. He practised various forms of yoga and sought teachers who could guide him toward spiritual truth. Saraswati was a strict vegetarian who recounted that he felt "sickened at the very sight of meat" after witnessing a Brahmin cut and prepare a rump steak.

Saraswati became a disciple of a teacher named Virajanand Dandeesha. Virajanand believed that Hinduism had strayed from its historical roots and that many of its practices had become impure. Sarasvati promised Virajanand that he would devote his life to restoring the rightful place of the Vedas in the Hindu faith.

== Teachings of Dayananda ==
Maharshi Dayanand advocated that all human beings are equally capable of achieving anything. He said all the creatures are the eternal Praja or citizens of the Supreme Lord. He said the four Vedas which are Rigveda, Yajurveda, Samaveda, and Atharvaveda are the only true uncorrupted sources of Dharma, revealed by the Supreme Lord, at the beginning of every creation, also because they are the only perfectly preserved knowledge without alterations using Sanskrit prosody or Chandas and different techniques of counting the number of verses with different Vedic chanting techniques. He says that confusion regarding the Vedas arose due to the misinterpretations of the Vedas, and the Vedas promote science and ask humans to discover the Ultimate Truth, which he has emphasised throughout his Commentary on the Vedas.

He accepted the teachings of the first ten Principal Upanishads also with Shvetashvatara Upanishad, which explains the Adhyatma part of the Vedas. He further said that any source, including Upanishads, should be considered and accepted to only that extent as they conform with the teachings of the Vedas.

He accepted the six Vedanga texts, which include grammar and the like required for the correct interpretation of the Vedas. Among Sanskrit grammatical texts, he says, Pāṇini's Aṣṭādhyāyī and its commentary, Mahabhashya by Maharshi Patanjali are the current surviving valid texts, and all other surviving modern-grammatical texts should not be accepted as they are confusing, dishonest, and will not help people in learning the Vedas.

He accepted the six Darshana Shastras which includes Samkhya, Vaisheshika, Nyaya, Yoga Sutras of Patanjali, Purva Mimamsa Sutras, Vedanta Sutras. Unlike medieval Sanskrit scholars, Dayanand said that all six Darshanas are not opponents, but each throws light on different aspects required by the creation. Hence, they are all independent in their own right, and all of them conform to the teachings of the Vedas. He says Acharya Kapila of Sankhya Darshan was not an atheist, but it is the scholars who misinterpreted his sutras.

He said the books called Brahamanas, such as Aitareya Brahmana, Shatapatha Brahmana, Sāma Brahmana, Gopatha Brahmana, etc., which are authored by the seers to explain the meaning of the Vedas, are also valid, but again only to that extent as they agree with the four Vedas, because these texts are prone to interpolations by others. He said it is these books which are called by the names "Itihasa, Purana, Narashamsa, Kalpa, Gatha" since they contain information about the life of seers and incidents, they inform about the creation of the World, etc...

He stated that the eighteen Puranas and the eighteen Upapuranas are not the authentic Puranas and are not authored by sage Vyasa, and they violate the teachings of the Vedas and therefore should not be accepted. The eighteen Puranas and Upapuranas are filled with contradictions, idol worship, incarnations, and personification of God, temples, rituals, and practices that are against the Vedas. In his book Satyarth Prakash, he says whatever 'good' is present in these eighteen Puranas and Upapuranas is already present in the Vedas, and since they contain too many false pieces of information that can mislead people, they should be rejected.

He points out that the sage Vyasa was called so not because he divided the Vedas, but the name indicates the "diameter or breadth," which means sage Vyasa had studied the Vedas in great depth.

He lists out various texts that should not be treated as honest texts to develop one's understanding of the World and the Lord. He rejected all of the Tantric texts, including Pancharatra. He said that these texts are not valid as they teach different customs, rituals, and practices which are against the Vedas.

Dayanand based his teachings on the Vedas, which can be summarised as follows:

1. three entities are eternal: 1. The Supreme Lord or Paramatma, 2. The Souls or Jivatmas, which are vast in number but not infinite, 3. Prakriti or Nature.
2. Prakriti or Nature, which is the material cause of the creation, is eternal and is characterised by Sattva, Rajas, and Tamas, which tend to be in equilibrium. In every cycle of creation, the conscious Supreme Lord will disturb its equilibrium and make it useful for the creation of the World and its forces and to manufacture the bodies required by the Souls. After a specific time called the Day of Brahma (Brahma means great, lengthy, etc.), the creation would be dissolved, and nature would be restored to its equilibrium. After a period called the Night of Brahma, which is equal to the length of the Day of Brahma, the creation would set forth again. This cycle of creation and dissolution is eternal.
3. Jiva or Jivatma or Soul or Self, many are different from one another yet have similar characteristics and can reach the 'same level' of bliss in the state of Moksha or Liberation. They are not made out of natural particles and are bodiless, beyond all sexes and all other characteristics as seen in the World, but they acquire a body made out of Nature, and it is known as taking birth. These souls are subtler than Nature itself but take birth through the body as per the creative principles set by the Supreme Lord based on their past Karma, and they put effort into improving themselves. By realising oneself, Nature, and the Supreme Lord, Souls are liberated. But this realisation depends on their efforts and knowledge. They keep coming to the World, use Nature, obtain the fruits of their actions, and appear to take of lives of different animals (Those who have attained higher bodies can also go back to lower forms based on their actions or Karma), they redo their actions, and are free to choose their actions, learn and relearn, and attain Liberation. After the long duration of Moksha or Liberation, one would come back again into the World. Since this period of Moksha or Liberation is long, it appears as though they never return or they never take birth again, to the other beings who are still in the World. Since they are eternal and capable of working, these characteristics cannot be destroyed. They are timeless, eternal, but are not omniscient and hence cannot be the pervaders of the entire Space.
4. The Supreme Lord who is one without a second like him, whose name is Om, is the efficient cause of the Universe. Lord's Chief characteristics are – Sat, Chit, and Ananda, i.e., "Exists", has "Supreme Consciousness", and is "Eternally Blissful". The Lord and his characteristics are the same. The Supreme Lord is ever present everywhere, whose characteristics are beyond Nature or Prakriti, and pervades all the Souls and the Nature. It is not characteristic of the Supreme Lord to take birth or incarnate. He is ever pure, i.e., unmixed by the characteristics of Nature and the Souls. The Supreme Lord is bodiless, infinite, hence has no form and hence cannot be worshipped through idols but can only be reached by any being through Yogic Samadhi as advocated in the Vedas, which is summarised in the Yoga Sutras of Patanjali. Since the Lord is bodiless and hence beyond all sexes, the Vedas address him as Father, Mother, Friend, Cause of the Worlds, Maker, etc He is the subtlest entity which is subtler than Nature, pervading and filling the entire existence and Space. It is due to his subtlety that he could take hold of Nature to create the Worlds, and he proposes no difficulty for the motion of the Worlds in Space. Hence, he is called Paramatman, which means 'Ultimate Pervader". There exists neither one who is equal to him nor completely opposed to him. The ideas of Satans, Ghosts, etc., are foreign to the Vedas.
5. He said the names Agni, Shiva, Vishnu, Brahma, Prajapati, Paramatma, Vishva, Vayu, etc. are the different characteristics of the Supreme Lord, and the meaning of each of the names should be obtained by Dhatupatha or Root. And these names do not refer to any Puranic Deities. Also, certain names may also refer to the worldly elements, which should be distinguished from their contexts.
6. Regarding the notion of Saguna and Nirguna in explaining the nature of the Lord. Saguna, he says, refers to characteristics of the Lord such as Pervasiveness, Omnipotency, Bliss, Ultimate Consciousness, etc. and, Nirguna, he says, refers to those characteristics which do not characterise the Lord, for example: Nature and the Souls such as different states of existence, taking birth, etc.
7. Moksha or Liberation does not refer to any characteristic place, but it is the state of Souls who have achieved Liberation. The Jivas or Souls are characterised by four different states of existence, which are: 1. Jagrat (Wakefulness), 2. Swapna (Dreaming), 3. Sushupti (Deep Sleep) and 4. Turiya. It is in the fourth Turiya state that the Souls exist without contact with Nature but are conscious of their own selves, other Souls, and the Supreme Lord (or Eternal Truth). This state of Moksha or Turiya is not seen in the World, hence incomparable, but can only be realised. In this state, they are free of every tinge of Nature and possess their own minds and experience bliss, the pleasure of their freedom, and the like, which are incomparable with any form of pleasure in the World. They are bodiless in that state and can attain any form of pleasure by their own will without requiring any external agent, such as, for example, they can perform the function of ears on their own without requiring material ears, etc. In that state, they are capable of fulfilling all their wishes, can go anywhere they want right then and there, witness the creation, maintenance, and dissolution of the Worlds, and they also come in contact with other individuals who are Liberated. But in that state, the creative powers remain with the Supreme Lord because the powers of the Lord and the Lord himself are not different things. In Moksha, the Souls remain distinct from one another and from the Supreme Lord. And, by means of their own capability and with the Supreme Lord as their means, they enjoy the bliss. After the period of Moksha, they pass on to this World again, in support of which, he quotes Vedic Mantras and Mundaka Upanishad, in his book Satyarth Prakash and Rigvedadi Bhashya Bhumika.
8. Again, it is the mark of Maharshi Dayanand's wit that he reconciles the notion of unending or eternal Moksha. He says, "The 'Eternal Moksha' or 'Ananta Moksha', refers to the 'permanency of pleasures of Moksha', unlike the momentary pleasures of the World, and does not necessarily mean the Souls will remain in Moksha permanently." He clarifies it by saying that the Souls are permanent and hence their characteristics also, and it is 'illogical' to consider that a Soul would get trapped in one of the moments of the beginningless time, and escape the World for eternity by using the finite time period of his lives in different creature forms. Even if the illogical is accepted, then also it means that even before he got trapped in creation, he was in Moksha, and hence his Moksha period may fail at times is a conclusion that is contradictory to the assumption that Moksha is an infinite period of time. Hence, the Vedic teaching that the Souls should come back after Liberation should be considered valid. In a different point of view, he clarifies the same idea by saying that all actions whatever, are done for a finite time period cannot yield infinite results or fruits of actions, and after the period of Moksha, the Jivas should not have the capability to enjoy the bliss of Moksha further.

He opposed caste system, Sati practice, child marriage, etc. which are against the spirit of the Vedas and advocated that all evils of society should be thoroughly investigated and should be removed. The Varna should be based on education and profession, and in his book Satyarth Prakash, he quotes passages from Manusmriti, Grihya Sutras, and Vedas which support his claims. He advocated the notion of Chakradhipatya (One Government Throughout the World).

== Dayanand's mission ==
Aum or Om is considered by the Arya Samaj to be the highest and most proper name of God.

He believed that Hinduism had been corrupted by divergence from the founding principles of the Vedas and that Hindus had been misled by the priesthood for the priests' self-aggrandisement. For this mission, he founded the Arya Samaj, enunciating the Ten Universal Principles called Krinvanto Vishwaryam. With these principles, he intended the whole world to be an abode for Aryas (Nobles).

His next step was to reform Hinduism with a new dedication to God. He travelled the country challenging religious scholars and priests to discussions, winning repeatedly through the strength of his arguments and knowledge of Sanskrit and Vedas. Hindu priests discouraged the laity from reading Vedic scriptures, and encouraged rituals, such as bathing in the Ganges and feeding of priests on anniversaries, which Dayananda pronounced as superstitions or self-serving practices. By exhorting the nation to reject such superstitious notions, his aim was to educate the nation to return to the teachings of the Vedas, and to follow the Vedic way of life. He also exhorted Hindus to accept social reforms, including the importance of cows for national prosperity as well as the adoption of Hindi as the national language for national integration. Through his daily life and practice of yoga and asanas, teachings, preaching, sermons and writings, he inspired Hindus to aspire for Swarajya (self-governance), nationalism, and spiritualism. He advocated the equal rights and respects to women and advocated for the education of all children, regardless of sex.

Dayanand also made critical analyses of faiths including Christianity and Islam, as well as of other Indian faiths like Jainism, Buddhism and Sikhism. In addition to discouraging idolatry in Hinduism, he was also against what he considered to be the corruption of the true and pure faith in his own country. Unlike many other reform movements of his times within Hinduism, the Arya Samaj's appeal was addressed not only to the educated few in India, but to the world as a whole as evidenced in the sixth principle of the Arya Samaj. As a result, his teachings professed universalism for all the living beings and not for any particular sect, faith, community or nation.

Arya Samaj allows and encourages converts to Hinduism. Dayananda's concept of Dharma is stated in the "Beliefs and Disbeliefs" section of Satyartha Prakash, he says:

"I accept as Dharma whatever is in full conformity with impartial justice, truthfulness and the like; that which is not opposed to the teachings of God as embodied in the Vedas. Whatever is not free from partiality and is unjust, partaking of untruth and the like, and opposed to the teachings of God as embodied in the Vedas—that I hold as Adharma."
"He, who after careful thinking, is ever ready to accept truth and reject falsehood; who counts the happiness of others as he does that of his own self, him I call just."

— Satyarth Prakash

Dayananda's Vedic message emphasised respect and reverence for other human beings, supported by the Vedic notion of the divine nature of the individual. In the Ten Universal Principles of the Arya Samaj, he enshrined the idea that "All actions should be performed with the prime objective of benefiting mankind", as opposed to following dogmatic rituals or revering idols and symbols. The first five principles speak of Truth, while the last five speak of a society with nobility, civics, co-living, and disciplined life. In his own life, he interpreted Moksha to be a lower calling, as it argued for benefits to the individual, rather than calling to emancipate others.

Dayananda's "Back to the Vedas" message influenced many thinkers and philosophers the world over.

=== Activities ===
Dayanand Saraswati is recorded to have been active since he was 14, which time he was able to recite religious verses and teach about them. He was respected at the time for taking part in religious debates. His debates were attended by large crowds.

On 22 October 1869 in Varanasi he won a debate against 27 scholars and 12 expert pandits. The debate was said to have been attended by over 50,000 people. The main topic was "Do the Vedas uphold deity worship?"

== Creation of Arya Samaj ==
Dayananda Saraswati's creation, the Arya Samaj, condemned practices of several different religions and communities, including such practices as animal sacrifice, pilgrimages, priest craft, offerings made in temples, the castes, child marriage, meat eating and discrimination against women. He argued that all of these practices ran contrary to good sense and the wisdom of the Vedas.

== Views on superstitions ==
He severely criticised practices which he considered to be superstitions, including sorcery, and astrology, which were prevalent in India at the time. Below are several quotes from his book, Satyarth Prakash:

"All alchemists, magicians, sorcerers, wizards, spiritists, etc. are cheats and all their practices should be looked upon as nothing but downright fraud. Young people should be well counseled against all these frauds, in their very childhood, so that they may not suffer through being duped by any unprincipled person."

— Satyarth Prakash

On astrology, he wrote:

When these ignorant people go to an astrologer and say "O Sir! What is wrong with this person?" He replies "The sun and other stars are maleficent to him. If you were to perform a propitiatory ceremony or have magic formulas chanted, or prayers said, or specific acts of charity done, he will recover. Otherwise, I should not be surprised, even if he were to lose his life after a long period of suffering."

Inquirer – Well, Mr. Astrologer, you know, the sun and other stars are but inanimate things like this earth of ours. They can do nothing but give light, heat, etc. Do you take them for conscious being possessed of human passions, of pleasure and anger, that when offended, bring on pain and misery, and when propitiated, bestow happiness on human beings?

Astrologer – Is it not through the influence of stars, then, that some people are rich and others poor, some are rulers, whilst others are their subjects?

Inq. – No, it is all the result of their deeds ... good or bad.

Ast. – Is the science of stars untrue then?

Inq. – No, that part of it which comprises Arithmetic, Algebra, Geometry, etc., and which goes by the name of Astronomy is true; but the other part that treats of the influence of stars on human beings and their actions and goes by the name of Astrology is all false.

— Chapter 2.2 Satyarth Prakash

He makes a clear distinction between Jyotiḥśāstra and astrology, calling astrology a fraud.

"Thereafter, they should thoroughly study the Jyotiḥśāstra – which includes Arithmetic, Algebra, Geometry, Geography, Geology, and Astronomy – in two years. They should also have practical training in these Sciences, learn the proper handling of instruments, master their mechanism, and know how to use them. But they should regard Astrology – which treats of the influence of stars and constellation on the destinies of man, of auspiciousness and inauspiciousness of time, of horoscopes, etc. – as a fraud, and never learn or teach any books on this subject.

— "The Scheme of Studies" p. 73 of the English Version of Satyarth Prakash.

== Views on other religions ==
He considered the prevalent religions to have either immoral stories, or badly practised, or some of them have sufficiently moved away from the Vedas. In his book Satyarth Prakash, Maharshi Dayanand has analysed critically current form of Hinduism, Jainism, Buddhism, Christianity and Islam.

=== Islam ===
He viewed Islam to be waging wars and immorality. He doubted that Islam had anything to do with the God, and questioned why a God would hate every non-believer, allowing the slaughter of animals, and command Muhammad to slaughter innocent people.

He further described Muhammad as "imposter", and one who held out "a bait to men and women, in the name of God, to compass his own selfish needs." He regarded Qur'an as "Not the Word of God. It is a human work. Hence it cannot be believed in."

=== Christianity ===
His analysis of the Bible was based on an attempt to compare it with scientific evidence, morality, and other properties. His analysis claimed that the Bible contains many stories and precepts that are immoral, praising cruelty, deceit and that encourage sin. One commentary notes many alleged discrepancies and fallacies of logic in the Bible e.g. that God fearing Adam eating the fruit of life and becoming his equal displays jealousy. His critique attempts to show logical fallacies in the Bible, and throughout he asserts that the events depicted in the Bible portray God as a man rather than an omniscient, omnipotent or complete being.

He opposed the perpetual virginity of Mary, adding that such doctrines are simply against the law of nature, and that God would never break his own law because God is omniscient and infallible.

=== Sikhism ===
He regarded Guru Nanak as "rogue", who was quite ignorant about Vedas and Sanskrit otherwise Nanak wouldn't be mistaken with words. He further said that followers of Sikhism are to be blamed for making up stories that Nanak possessed miraculous powers and met God. He criticised Guru Gobind Singh and other Sikh Gurus, saying they "invented fictitious stories", although he also recognised Gobind Singh to be "indeed a very brave man."

=== Jainism ===
He regarded Jainism as "a most dreadful religion", writing that Jains were intolerant and hostile towards the non-Jains.

=== Buddhism ===
Dayanand described Buddhism as "anti-Vedic" and "atheistic." He noted that the type of "salvation" Buddhism prescribes, is attainable even to dogs and donkeys. He further criticised the Buddhist cosmology which says that Earth was not created.

== Assassination attempts ==
Dayananda was subjected to many unsuccessful assassination attempts on his life.

According to his supporters, he was poisoned on a few occasions, but due to his regular practice of Hatha Yoga he survived all such attempts. One story tells that attackers once attempted to drown him in a river, but Dayananda dragged the assailants into the river instead, though he released them before they drowned.

Another account claims that he was attacked by Muslims who were offended by his criticism of Islam while meditating on the Ganges. They threw him into the water but he is claimed to have saved himself because his Pranayama practice allowed him to stay under water until the attackers left.

== Assassination ==
Raja Nahar Singh was one of the devotees of Swami Dayanand Saraswati and he welcomed him with open heart when visited Shahpura on 9th March 1883. While Swami was in Shahpura, he received invitation to come to Jodhpur but Nahar Singhji had warned him against going to Jodhpur. In 1883, the Maharaja of Jodhpur, Jaswant Singh II, invited Dayananda to stay at his palace. The Maharaja was eager to become Dayananda's disciple and to learn his teachings. Dayananda went to the Maharaja's restroom during his stay and saw him with a dancing girl named Nanhi Jaan. Dayananda asked the Maharaja to forsake the girl and all unethical acts and to follow the Dharma like a true Arya (Noble). Dayananda's suggestion offended Nanhi, who decided to take revenge.

On 29 September 1883, Nanhi Jaan bribed Dayananda's cook, Jagannath, to mix small pieces of glass in his nightly milk. Dayananda was served glass-laden milk before bed, which he promptly drank, becoming bedridden for several days, and suffering excruciating pain. The Maharaja quickly arranged doctor's services for him. However, by the time doctors arrived, his condition had worsened, and he had developed large bleeding sores. Upon seeing Dayananda's suffering, Jagannath was overwhelmed with guilt and confessed his crime to Dayananda. On his deathbed, Dayananda forgave him, and gave him a bag of money, telling him to flee the kingdom before he was found and executed by the Maharaja's men.

Later, the Maharaja arranged for him to be sent to Mount Abu, however, after staying for some time in Abu, on 26 October 1883, he was sent to Ajmer for better medical care. There was no improvement in the Swami's health, no medical aid was given and he died on the morning of the Hindu festival of Diwali on 30 October 1883 chanting Mantras.

== Cremation and commemoration ==
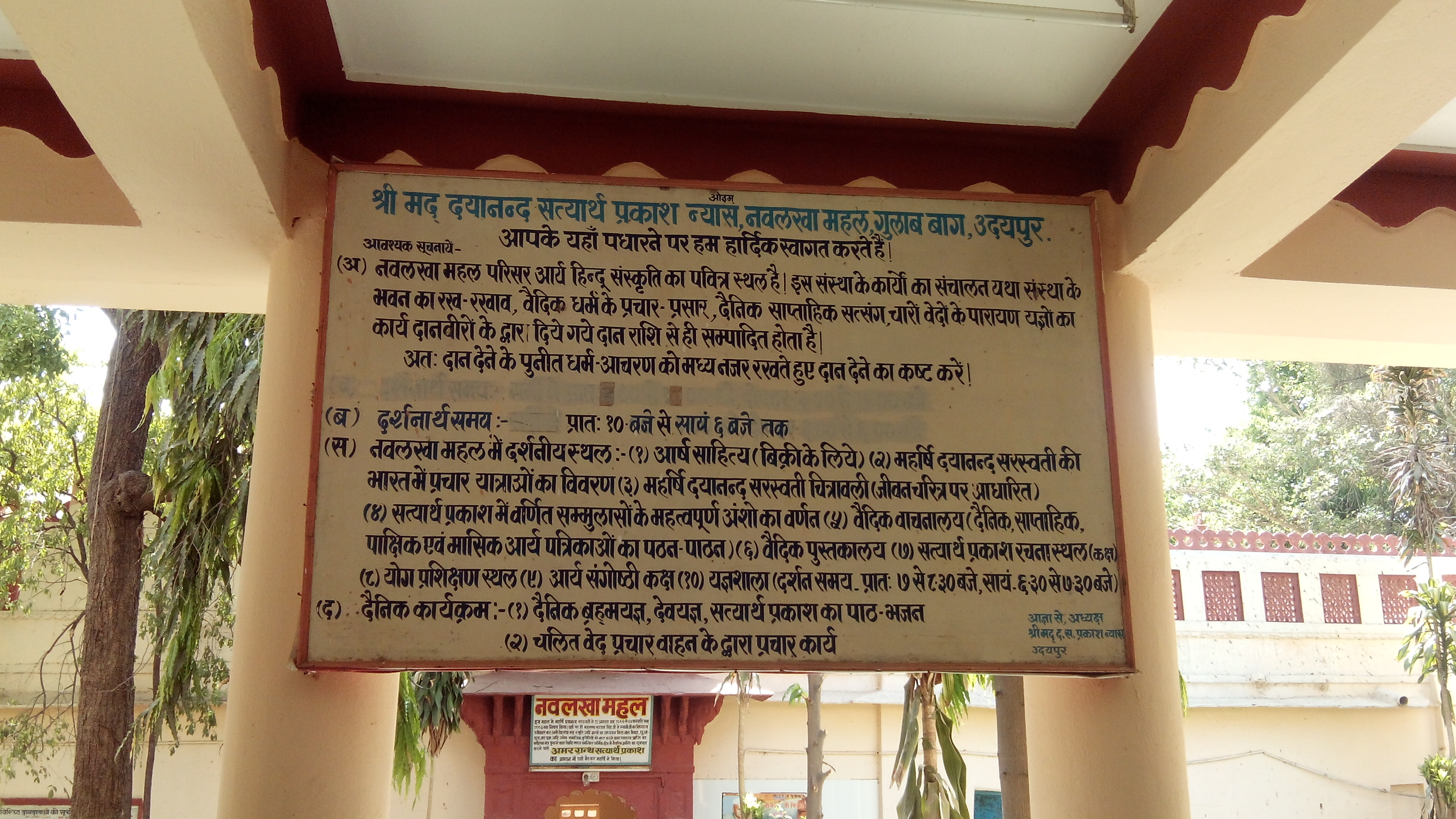
Information board inside Navlakha Mahal.

He died at Bhinai Kothi at Bhinai 54 km south of Ajmer, and his ashes were scattered at Ajmer in Rishi Udyan as per his wishes. Rishi Udyan, which has a functional Arya Samaj Mandir with daily morning and evening Yajna Homa, is located on the banks of Ana Sagar Lake off the NH58 Ajmer-Pushkar Highway. An annual three day Arya Samaj Mela is held every year at Rishi Udyan on Swami Dayanand's death anniversary at the end of October, which also entails Vedic seminars, Vedas memorisation competition, Yajna, and Dhavaja Rohan flag march. It is organised by the Paropkarini Sabha, which was founded by Swami Dayanand Saraswati on 16 August 1880 in Meerut, registered in Ajmer on 27 February 1883, and since 1893 has been operating from its office in Ajmer.

Every year on Maha Shivaratri, Arya Samajis celebrate Rishi Bodh Utsav during the 2 days Mela at Tankara organised by the Tankara Trust, during which the Shobha Yatra procession and Maha Yajna is held; the event is also attended by the Prime Minister of India Narendra Modi and Chief Minister of Gujarat Vijay Rupani.

Navlakha Mahal inside Gulab Bagh and Zoo at Udaipur is also associated with him; he wrote there the second edition of his seminal work, Satyarth Prakash, in Samvat 1939 (1882-83 CE).

== Legacy ==
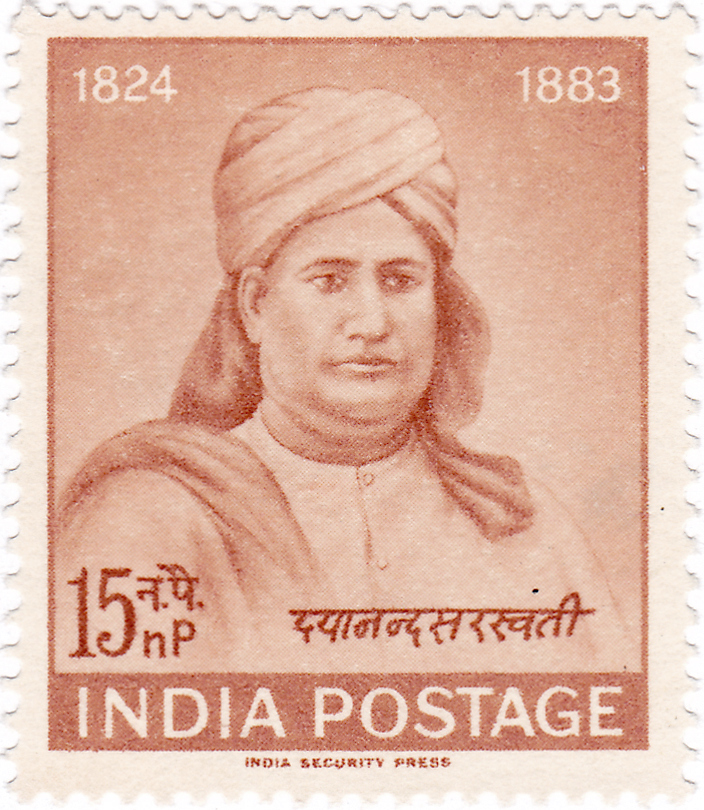
Dayananda Saraswati on a 1962 stamp of India.

Maharshi Dayanand University in Rohtak, Maharshi Dayanand Saraswati University in Ajmer, DAV University (Dayanand Anglo-Vedic Schools System) in Jalandhar are named after him. So are over 800 schools and colleges under D.A.V. College Managing Committee, including Dayanand College at Ajmer. Industrialist Nanji Kalidas Mehta built the Maharshi Dayanand Science College and donated it to the Education Society of Porbandar, after naming it after Dayananda Saraswati.

Dayananda Saraswati is most notable for influencing the freedom movement of India. His views and writings have been used by various individuals, including Shyamji Krishna Varma, Subhas Chandra Bose, Lala Lajpat Rai, Madam Cama, Vinayak Damodar Savarkar, Lala Hardayal, Madan Lal Dhingra, Ram Prasad Bismil, Mahadev Govind Ranade, Swami Shraddhanand, S. Satyamurti, Pandit Lekh Ram, Mahatma Hansraj and others.

He also had a notable influence on Bhagat Singh. Singh, after finishing primary school, had joined the Dayanand Anglo-Vedic Middle School, of Mohan Lal Road, in Lahore. Sarvepalli Radhakrishnan, on Shivratri, 24 February 1964, wrote about Dayananda:

Swami Dayananda ranked highest among the makers of modern India. He had worked tirelessly for the political, religious and cultural emancipation of the country. He was guided by reason, taking Hinduism back to the Vedic foundations. He had tried to reform society with a clean sweep, which was again needed today. Some of the reforms introduced in the Indian Constitution had been inspired by his teachings.

The places Dayanand visited during his life were often changed culturally as a result. Jodhpur adopted Hindi as main language, and later the present day Rajasthan did the same. Other admirers included Swami Vivekananda, Ramakrishna, Bipin Chandra Pal, Vallabhbhai Patel, Shyama Prasad Mukherjee, and Romain Rolland, who regarded Dayananda as a remarkable and unique figure.

American Spiritualist Andrew Jackson Davis described Dayanand's influence on him, calling Dayanand a "Son of God", and applauding him for restoring the status of the Nation. Sten Konow, a Swedish scholar noted that Dayanand revived the history of India.

Others who were notably influenced by him include Ninian Smart, and Benjamin Walker.

The role of Dayananda's followers in forming his posthumous legacy has been studied by scholars too. J. Barton Scott writes that the biographies of Arya Samaj which were written in period from the 1880s to the 1920s formed a genre of religious hagiography through which Dayananda was depicted not only as an exemplary person but also as a symbol of religious asceticism.

== Achievements ==
Dayananda Saraswati wrote more than 60 works. This includes a 16-volume explanation of the Vedangas, an incomplete commentary on the Ashtadhyayi (Panini's grammar), several small tracts on ethics and morality, Vedic rituals and sacraments, and a piece on the analysis of rival doctrines (such as Advaita Vedanta, Islam and Christianity). Some of his major works include the Satyarth Prakash, Satyarth Bhumika, Sanskarvidhi, Rigvedadi Bhashya Bhumika, Rigved Bhashyam (up to 7/61/2) and Yajurved Bhashyam. The Paropakarini Sabha located in the city of Ajmer was founded by Saraswati to publish and preach his works and Vedic texts.

=== Complete list of works ===
1. Sandhya (Unavailable) (1863)
2. Bhagwat Khandan or Paakhand Khandan or Vaishnavmat Khandan (1866) which criticised the Srimad Bhagavatam
3. Advaitmat Khandan which criticised Advaita Vedanta.
4. Panchmahayajya Vidhi (1874 & 1877)
5. Satyarth Prakash (1875 & 1884)
6. Vedanti Dhwant Nivaran (1875) which criticised Vedanta philosophy.
7. Vedviruddh mat Khandan or Vallabhacharya mat Khandan (1875) which criticised Shuddhadvaita philosophy.
8. Shikshapatri Dhwant Nivaran or Swaminarayan mat Khandan (1875) which criticised the Shikshapatri.
9. Ved Bhashyam Namune ka Pratham Ank (1875)
10. Ved Bhashyam Namune ka Dwitiya Ank (1876)
11. Aryabhivinaya (Incomplete) (1876)
12. Sanskarvidhi (1877 & 1884)
13. Aaryoddeshya Ratna Maala (1877)
14. Rigvedaadi Bhasya Bhumika (1878) which is a foreword on his commentary on the Vedas.
15. Rigved Bhashyam (7/61/1) (Incomplete) (1877 to 1899) which is a commentary on the Rigveda according to his interpretation.
16. Yajurved Bhashyam (Complete) (1878 to 1889) which is a commentary on the Yajurveda according to his interpretation.
17. Asthadhyayi Bhashya (2 Parts) (Incomplete) (1878 to 1879) which is a commentary on Panini's Astadhyayi according to his interpretation.
1. Vedang Prakash (Set of 16 Books)
  1. Varnoccharan Shiksha (1879)
  2. Sanskrit Vakyaprabodhini (1879)
  3. VyavaharBhanu (1879)
  4. Sandhi Vishay
  5. Naamik
  6. Kaarak
  7. Saamaasik
  8. Taddhit
  9. Avyayaarth
  10. Aakhyatik
  11. Sauvar
  12. Paaribhaasik
  13. Dhatupath
  14. Ganpaath
  15. Unaadikosh
  16. Nighantu
1. Gautam Ahilya ki Katha (Unavailable) (1879)
2. Bhrantinivaran (1880)
3. Bhrmocchedan (1880)
4. Anubhrmocchedan (1880)
5. Go Karuna Nidhi (1880) which contains his views on cow slaughter in India.
6. Chaturved Vishay Suchi (1971)
7. Gadarbh Taapni Upnishad (As per Babu Devendranath Mukhopadhyay) (Unavailable)
8. Hugli Shastrarth Tatha Pratima Pujan Vichar (1873) which is a record of his arguments with orthodox pandits at Bengal and his views regarding validity of idol worship in Hinduism.
9. Jaalandhar Shastrarth (1877) which is a record of his arguments with orthodox pandits at Jalandhar.
10. Satyasatya Vivek (Bareily Shastrarth) (1879) which is a record of his arguments with orthodox pandits at Bareily.
11. Satyadharm Vichar (Mela Chandapur) (1880) which is a record of his arguments with Muslim and Christian theologians at an interfaith dialogue held in Chandapur of Shahjahanpur district.
12. Kashi Shastrarth (1880) which is a record of his arguments with orthodox pandits at Varanasi.

For other miscellaneous Shastrarth read:

- Dayanand Shastrarth Sangrah published by Arsh Sahitya Prachar Trust, Delhi.
- Rishi Dayanand ke Shastrarth Evam Pravachan published by Ramlal Kapoor Trust Sonipat (Haryana).
- Arya Samaj ke Niyam aur Upniyam (30 November 1874) which deals with code of conduct for the Arya Samaj.
- Updesh Manjari (Puna Pravachan) (4 July 1875) which is a record of his sermons delivered to his followers at Pune.
- Swami Dayanand Dwara Swakathit Janm Charitra (During Puna Pravachan) (4 August 1875) which is a record of his early life spoken by himself to his followers at Pune.
- Maharshi Dayanand Saraswati Jivan Charitra Photo Gallery
- Swami Dayanand Dwara Swakathit Janm Charitra, for the Theosophist Society's monthly Journal: Nov & 1 Dec
- Rishi Dayanand ke Patra aur Vigyapan which is a collection of the letters and pamphlets written by him.

== See also ==
- Cow protection movement
- Swami Shraddhanand
- Sudhakar Chaturvedi

== Bibliography ==
- Garg, Gaṅgā Rām (1984). World Perspectives on Swami Dayananda Saraswati. Concept Publishing Company.
- Sinhal, Meenu (2009). Swami Dayanand Saraswati. Prabhat Prakashan. ISBN 978-81-8430-017-8.
