= Arya Samaj =

Vedic reform organisation

- Official logo, featuring Aum with pluti.
- Formation: 10 April 1875 (151 years ago); Bombay, Bombay Presidency, British India (present-day Mumbai, Maharashtra, India)
- Founder: Dayananda Saraswati
- Type: Religious organisation
- Legal status: Foundation
- Purpose: Educational, Religious studies, Spirituality, Social reforms
- Region served: Worldwide
- Members: 10 million (world); 8 million (India)
- Official language: Hindi
- Website: www.aryasamaj.org

Arya Samaj (lit. 'Aryan Society') is a monotheistic Indian Hindu reform movement that promotes values and practices based on the belief in the infallible authority of the Vedas. Dayananda Saraswati founded the Samaj in the 1870s. Arya Samaj was the first Hindu organisation to introduce proselytisation in Hinduism.

== Etymology ==
"Arya Samaj" is a compound Sanskrit term consisting of the words "arya" and "samaj". The term "arya" refers to an individual who possesses virtuous attributes and noble characteristics, whereas "samaj" denotes a social group or organised community. Therefore, the term "arya samaj" refers to a community of individuals of high moral character.

== History ==
=== The beginning ===
Swami Dayanand Saraswati established the Arya Samaj in April 1875 in Bombay with ten principles. However, these principles were finally settled in 1877 in Lahore.

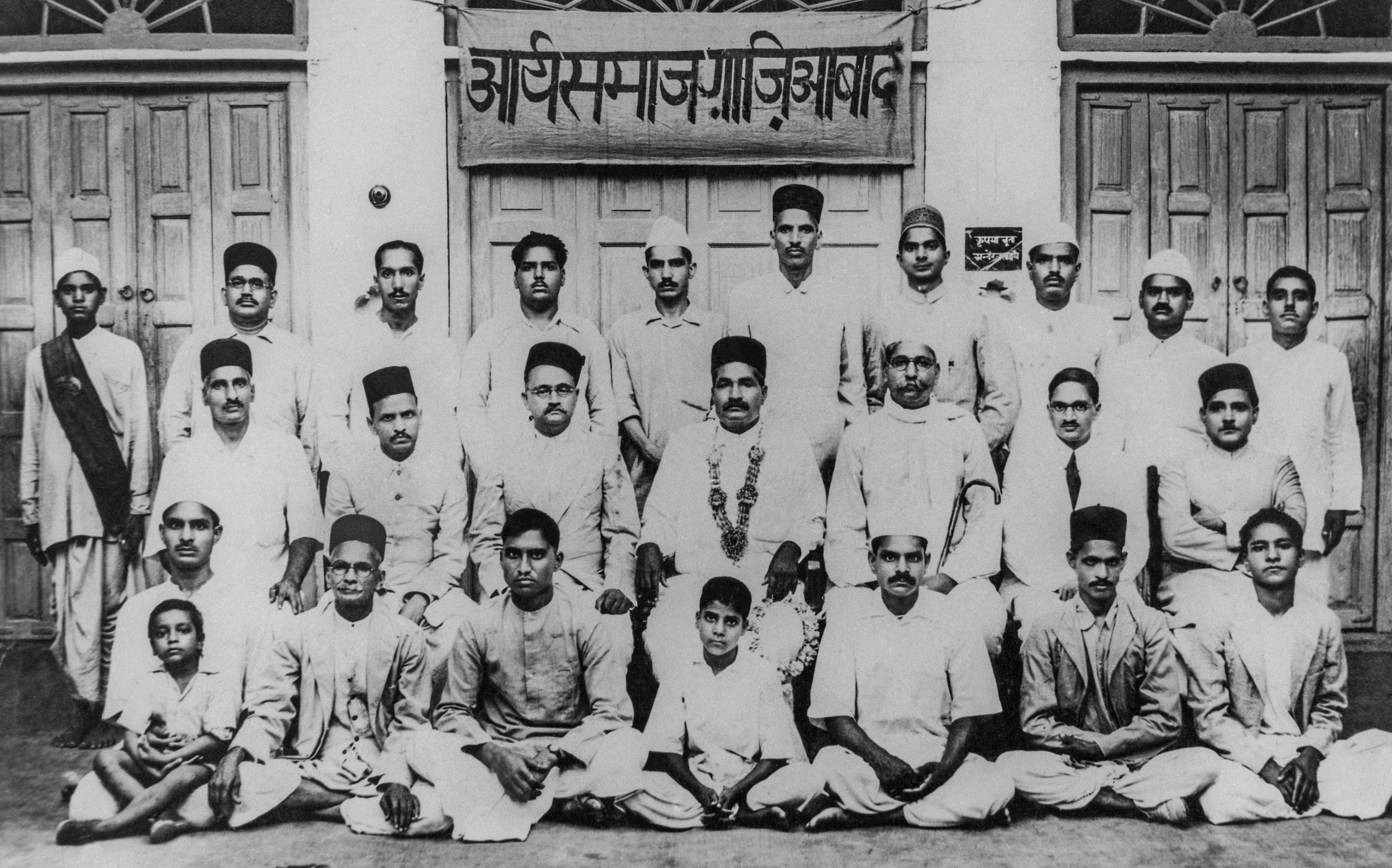
Charan Singh (fifth from left in last row) with members of Arya Samaj in 1930

=== Vedic schools ===
Between 1869 and 1873, Dayanand began his efforts to reform orthodox Hinduism in India. He established Gurukula (Vedic schools) which emphasised Vedic values, culture, and Satya (Truth). The schools gave separate educations to boys and girls based on ancient Vedic principles. The Vedic school system was also to relieve Indians from the pattern of a British education.

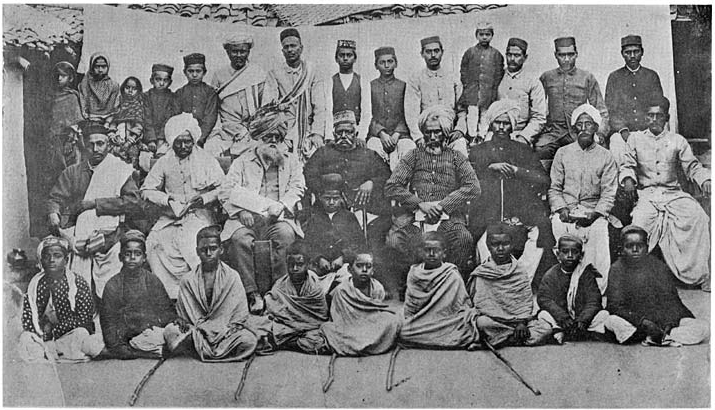
A meeting of the Arya Samaj for investing boys with the sacred thread.

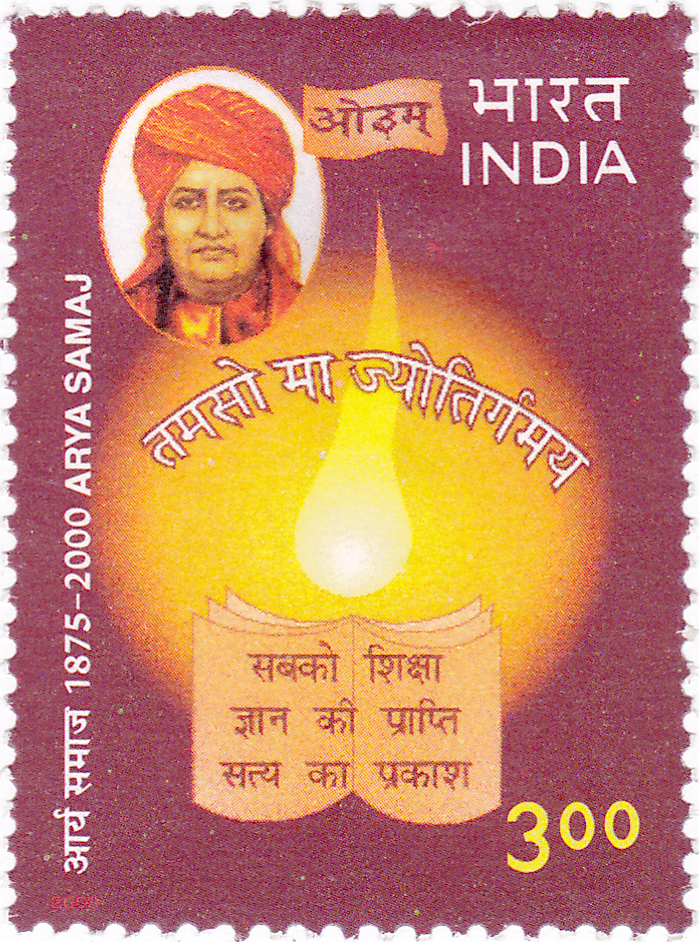
A 2000 Indian postage stamp dedicated to Arya Samaj.

=== Arya Samaj in Bengal ===
Due to schisms in the Adi Brahmo Samaj at Calcutta, a new variant of Adi Brahmoism called Arya Samaj began to take root in the Punjab. When he traveled to Calcutta Swami Dayanand had come into close and extended contact with Rajnarayan Bose, Debendranath Tagore etc. Swami Dayanand closely studied Tagore's book Brahmo Dharma, a comprehensive manual of religion and ethics for Adi Dharma, while in Calcutta. The bone of contention between these two Samajs was over the authority of the Vedas–whose authority the Adi Dharma rejected and held to be inferior works, whereas Arya Samaj held Vedas to be divine revelation. Despite this difference of opinion, however, it seems that the members of the Brahmo Samaj and Swami Dayanand parted on good terms, the former having publicly praised the latter's visit to Calcutta in several journals and the latter having taken inspiration from the former's activity in the social sphere.

== Growth of Arya Samaj after Dayanand ==
Dayanand was assassinated in 1883. Despite this setback, the Arya Samaj continued to grow, especially in Punjab. The early leaders of the Samaj were Pandit Lekh Ram (1858–1897) and Swami Shraddhanand (Mahatma Munshi Ram Vij) (1856–1926). Some authors claim that the activities of the Samaj led to increased antagonism between Muslims and Hindus. Shraddhanand led the Shuddhi movement that aimed to bring Hindus who had converted to other religions back to Hinduism.

In the late 1880s, the Arya Samaj members in Punjab were divided on the question of vegetarianism. The group that opposed meat eating were called the "Mahatma Party", whilst the other group the "Cultured Party" defended freedom in diet. Munshi Ram, Lala Durga Prasad and Guru Datta Vidyarthi were leaders of the vegetarian branch of Arya Samaj and influential in the cow protection movement. In March and August 1893, Munshi Ram attempted without success to restrict Lahore Arya Samaj membership to vegetarians. A month later, non-vegetarian members lost their majority vote and withdrew from Lahore Arya Samaj, forming a rival group. The rival non-vegetarian group was led by Lala Lajpat Rai. Lala Durga Prasad founded the Punjab Vegetarian Society in 1889.

In the early 1900s, the Samaj (or organisations inspired by it such as Jat Pat Todak Mandal) campaigned against caste discrimination. They also campaigned for widow remarriage and women's education. The Samaj also established chapters in Dutch colonies and British colonies having Indian population such as South Africa, Fiji, Mauritius, Suriname, Guyana and Trinidad and Tobago.

Prominent Indian nationalists such as Lala Lajpat Rai belonged to Arya Samaj and were active in its campaigning. The British colonial government in the early part of 20th century viewed the Samaj as a political body. Some Samajis in government service were dismissed for belonging to the Samaj.

In the 1930s, when the Hindu nationalist group, the Rashtriya Swayamsevak Sangh grew in prominence in Northern India, they found support from the Arya Samaj of Punjab.

=== Arya Samaj in Punjab ===
In Punjab, the Arya Samaj was opposed by the Ahmadiyya movement which provided the Samaj one of its most aggressive opponents from among the various Muslim groups and whose founder Mirza Ghulam Ahmad was extensively involved in theological disputations with Samaj leaders, most notably with Pandit Lekh Ram. It was also opposed by the Sikh dominated Singh Sabha, the forerunner of the Shiromani Akali Dal. It was also opposed by Vaishnavas, who were criticised by Dayānanda Sarasvatī.

=== Arya Samaj in Sindh ===
The Samaj was active in Sindh at the end of the 19th and the beginning of the 20th century. The activities of the Samaj in the region included using Shuddhi in integrating half-Muslim or low-caste communities into the organisation. Narayan Dev, a Samaj member active in making many conversions is extolled as a Sindhi martyr. He is sometimes referred to as 'Dayanand Ke Vir Sipahi' (Dayanand's Heroic Soldier). Dev was killed in a street fight in 1948. The history of Sindhi nationalism is also tied with the activities of the Arya Samaj. In the 19th century, the Hindu community of Sindh had been challenged by Christian missionaries and the Samaj served as a deterrent to the conversions done by Christian missionaries in the region. A Hindu Sindhi leader, K. R. Malkani, later on, became prominent in the Rashtriya Swayamsevak Sangh (RSS), and the BJP. According to Malkani, the Arya Samaj created a "new pride" among the Hindu Sindhis by opening gymnasia and Sanskrit Pathashalas in the 1930s.

=== Arya Samaj in Gujarat ===
The Arya Samaj of Gujarat were missionaries from Punjab who had been encouraged to move to Gujarat to carry out educational work amongst the untouchable castes by the Maharaja Sayajirao Gaekwad III. The Gujarati Arya Samaj opened orphanages. The Samaj started losing support when Mahatma Gandhi returned to India in 1915 because many activists joined his movement.

=== Reconversion in Malabar ===
In 1921, during a rebellion by the Muslim Moplah community of Malabar Indian newspapers reported that several Hindus were forcibly converted to Islam. The Arya Samaj extended its efforts to the region to reconvert these people back to Hinduism through Shuddhi ceremonies.

=== Views of Sanatani Hindus on the Samaj ===
The then Shankaracharya of Badrinath Math in 1939 in a letter to the archbishop of Canterbury, called Arya Samajis un-Hindu. He also criticised the Samaj efforts at converting Christians and Muslims.

=== Arya Samaj in Hyderabad State ===
A branch of Arya Samaj was established at Dharur in Beed district of Hyderabad State, the largest princely state during British rule. Keshav Rao Koratkar was the president of the organisation until 1932. During his tenure, the Samaj established schools and libraries throughout the state. Although a social and religious organisation, the Samaj activities assumed a great political role in resisting the government of the Nizam during the 1930s. In 1938–1939, Arya Samaj teamed up with the Hindu Mahasabha to resist the Nizam government through Satyagraha. The Nizam government responded by raiding and desecrating Arya Samaj mandirs. The Samaj, in turn, criticised Islam and the Islamic rulers of the state. This widely increased the gulf between the Hindu and Muslim populations of the state.

=== Language issue ===
Arya Samaj promoted the use of Hindi in Punjab and discouraged the use of Punjabi. This was a serious point of difference between the Sikhs, represented by the Shiromani Akali Dal group and the Arya Samaj. The difference was marked during the period immediately following the independence of India and the time of the Punjabi Suba (demand for a Punjabi-speaking state).

=== Humanitarian efforts ===
Arya Samaj is a charitable organisation. For example, donations were made to victims of the 1905 Kangra earthquake. The Samaj campaigned for women's right to vote and for the protection of widows. From 2 million in 1947, in 2011 there were an estimated 10 million Arya Samajis in the world, mostly found in India, running more than 1,000 colleges, 10,000 schools as well as thousands of charitable dispensaries and public libraries.

== Contemporary Arya Samaj ==
=== Arya Samaj in India ===
Arya Samaj schools and temples are found in almost all major cities and as well as in rural areas of (especially North) India. Some are authorised to conduct weddings. The Samaj is associated with the Dayanand Anglo Vedic (DAV) schools which number over eight hundred. There are eight million followers of the Samaj in India.

=== Arya Samaj around the world ===
Arya Samaj is active in countries including Guyana, Suriname, Trinidad and Tobago, Fiji, Australia, South Africa, Kenya, Mauritius and other countries where a significant Hindu diaspora is present. The Arya Samaj in Kenya runs several schools in Nairobi and other cities of the country.

Immigrants to Canada and the United States from South Asia, East Africa, South Africa, and the Caribbean countries have set up Arya Samaj temples for their respective communities. Most major metropolitan areas of the United States have chapters of Arya Samaj.

Arya Samaj has been active in the United Kingdom since the 1890s. In 1976, Arya Samaj London was established with its own building in West London.

== Core beliefs ==
Aum considered by the Arya Samaj to be the highest and most proper name of God.

Members of the Arya Samaj believe in a creator God referred to as the syllable 'Aum' mentioned in the Yajurveda (40:17). They believe the Vedas are an infallible authority, and they respect the Upanishads and other Vedic philosophy. They reject other non-Vedic religious texts in Hinduism. For instance, they believe epics like the Ramayana and the Mahabharata are legends of historical figures and reject them as references to supreme beings and avatars. The members of Arya Samaj also reject other Hindu scriptural works such as the Puranas. Worship of idols (murti puja) is strictly prohibited in the Samaj.

The core beliefs of Arya Samaj are postulated below:

1. The primaeval cause of all genuine knowledge and all that is known by means of knowledge is God.
2. God is truth-consciousness: formless, omnipotent, unborn, infinite, unchangeable, incomparable, omnipresent, internal, undecaying, immortal, eternal, holy, and creator of the universe. God alone deserves worship.
3. The Vedas are repositories of all of true knowledge. It is the paramount duty of all Aryas to study, teach, and propound the Vedas.
4. One should be ever ready to imbibe truth and forsake untruth.
5. All acts should be done in accordance with Dharma, i.e., after deliberating on what truth and untruth are.
6. The prime object of Arya Samaj is to do good to the whole world, i.e., to achieve physical, spiritual, and social prosperity for all.
7. Our conduct towards all should be guided by love, by injunctions of Dharma and according to their respective positions.
8. One should dispel ignorance and promote knowledge.
9. One should not be content with one's own prosperity only but should consider the prosperity of all as his own prosperity.
10. All human beings should abide by the rules concerning social or everyone's benefit, while everyone should be free to follow any rule beneficial for them.

== Practices ==
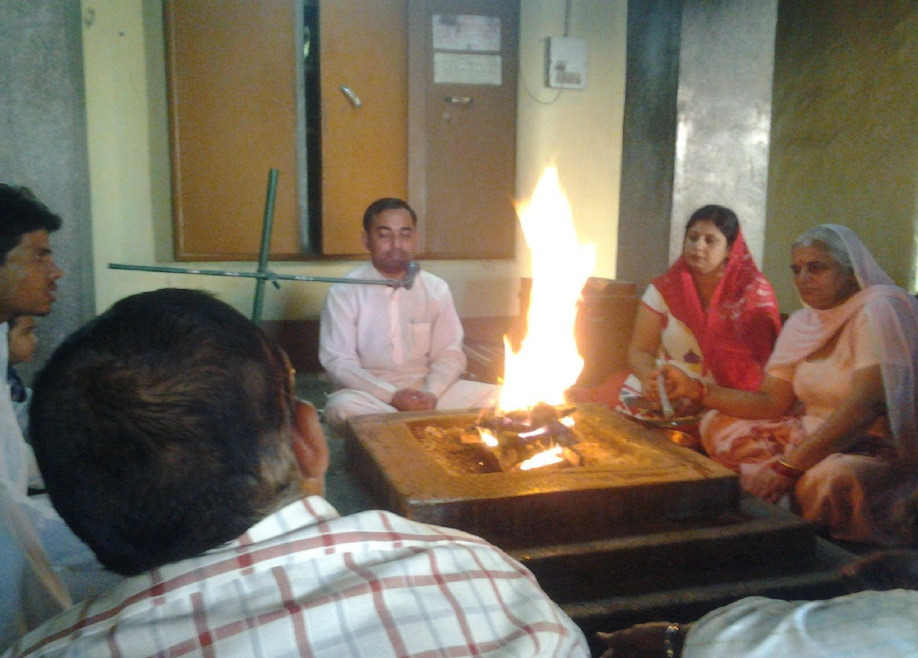
Havan being performed by Arya Samaj.

The Arya Samaj members consider the Gayatri Mantra, as the most holy mantra and chant it periodically, do the meditation known as Sandhya and make offering to the holy fire (Havan). The Havan can be performed with a priest for special occasions or without a priest for personal worship. The Havan is usually performed as per the Havan Pustika, a simplified guide to Havan, having mantras for general or special occasions. The priest is generally a Vedic scholar from the local Arya Samaj Mandir or Gurukul. Sometimes elder members of the family or neighbours can also perform the Havan acting as a Purohit. The host is known as the "Yajamana". The priest can be called an "Acharya", "Shastri" or "Pandit" depending upon his scholarly status and local reputation. It is customary to give a nominal "Dakshina" to the priest after Havan, although in Arya Samaj it is more symbolic and the priest does not state any sum. The sum is decided by the host's capability and status but is still a small amount. After a death, Arya Samajis will often conduct a Havan and collect the ashes on the fourth day.

=== Diwali ===
Diwali is a very important day in Arya Samaj as Swami Dayanand died on this day. A special Havan is done for the same reason.

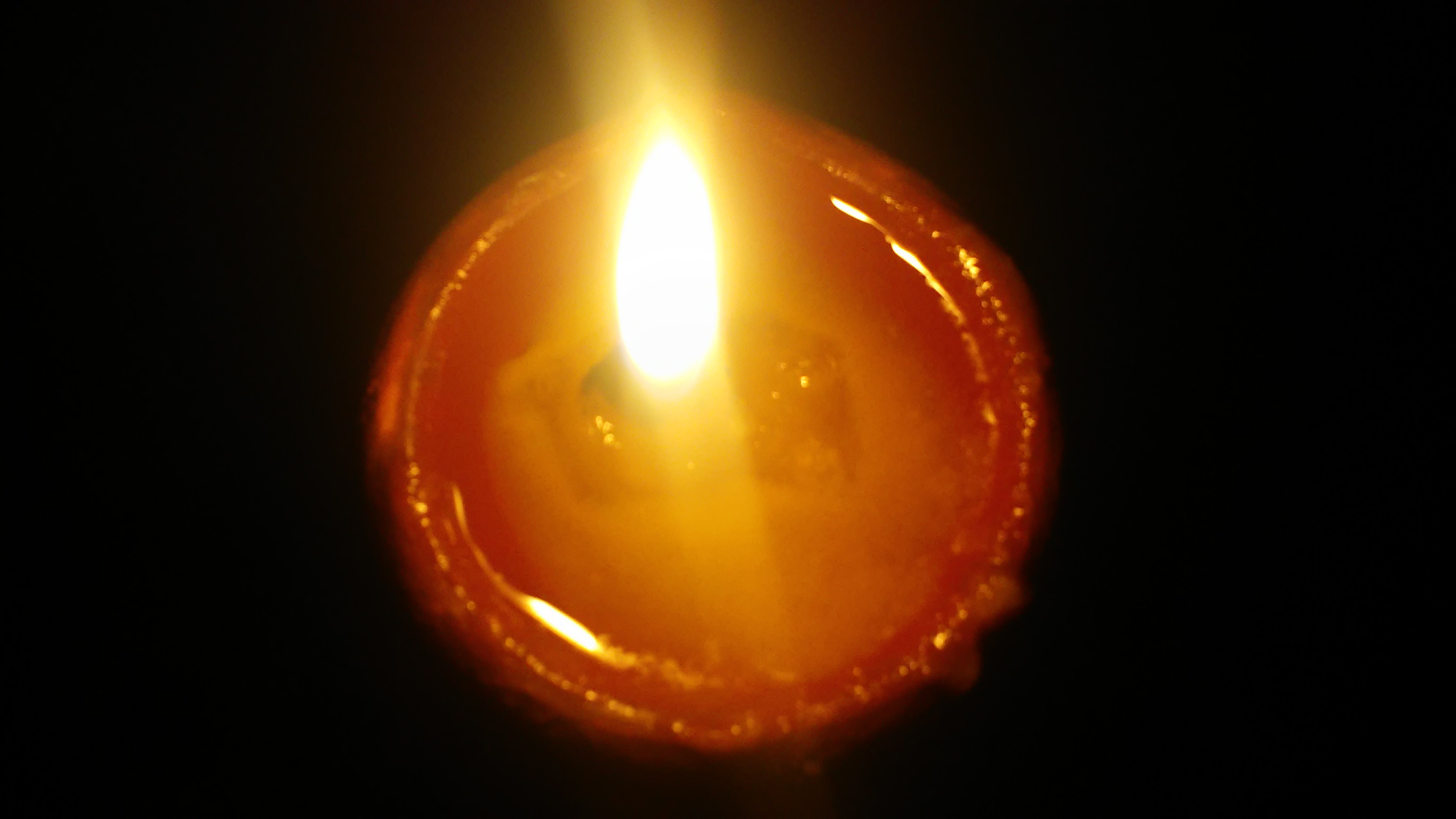
Diya with one wick

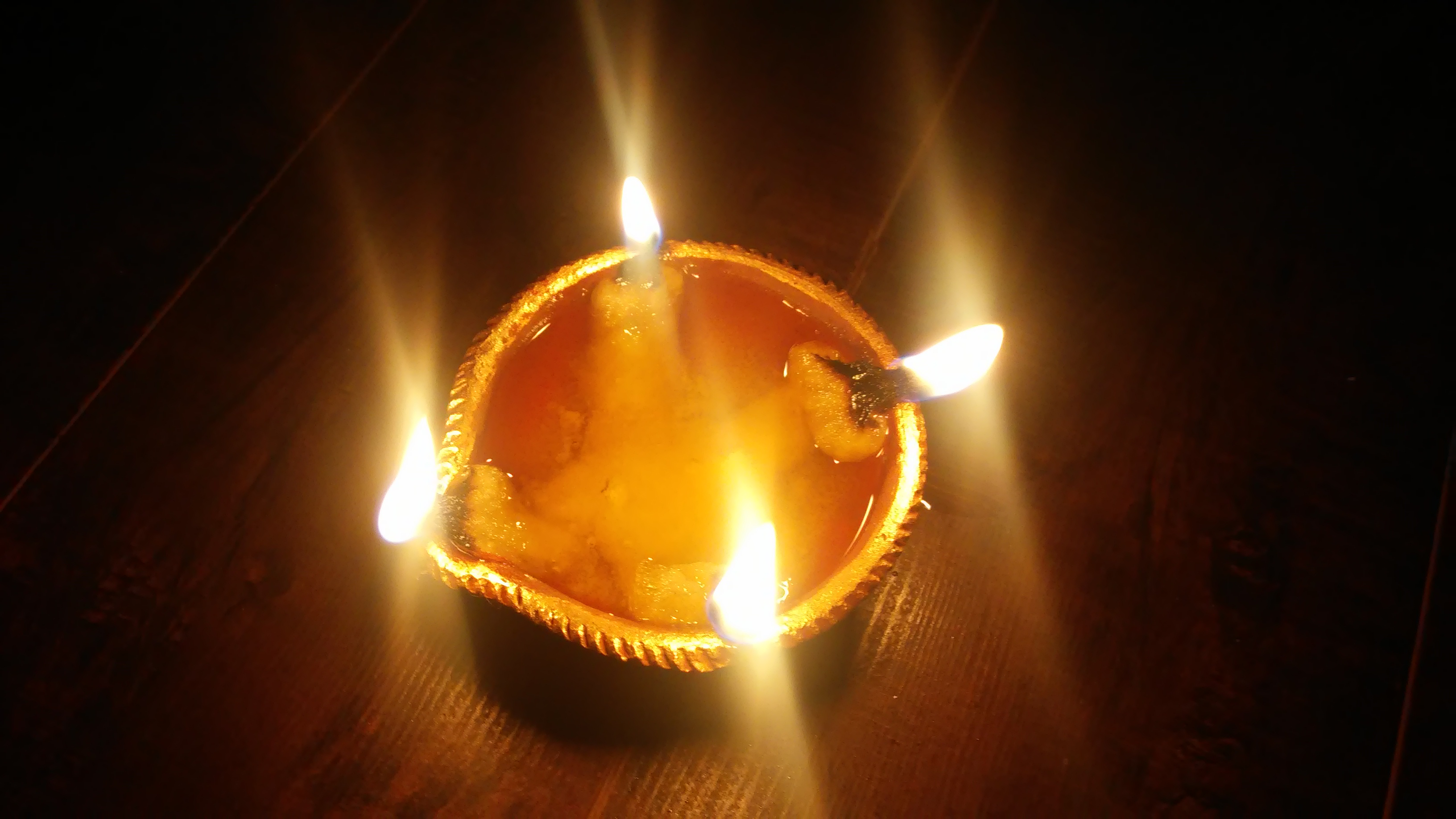
Diya with four wicks, pointing in each direction (N, W, S, E).

The Arya Samaj version of the Hindu festival Diwali is typified by the celebration in Suriname. The festival celebrates the victory of good over evil. A vegetarian fast is kept. The Gayatri Mantra is recited while oil lamps are lit, in front of a fire altar lit with sandalwood. One Diya lamp, which is larger has two wicks crossed to produce four lights, one in each direction and is lit first. The smaller lamp has one wick. A lamp is kept in every room except the bathroom and restroom. More lamps can be lit, which can be placed arbitrarily in the yard, living room and so on.

=== Holi ===
Holi is celebrated as the conclusion of winter and the start of spring to sow the land and hope for a good harvest. This day is marked by colours and songs (Chautal). It does not require specific prayer or fasting, however, some people keep a vegetarian fast on this day. The festivities do not associate Holi with a particular deity such as Vishnu or Shiva. The early Arya Samajist in 19th century Lahore adapted the festival to include prayers and Havan but avoid the intoxication, and obscenities associated with traditional celebrations.

== Arya Samaj across the world ==
- Arya Samaj in Burma
- Arya Samaj in Fiji
- Arya Samaj in Ghana
- Arya Samaj in Guyana
- Arya Samaj in Kenya
- Arya Samaj in Mauritius
- Arya Ravived Samaj in Mauritius
- Arya Samaj in Mozambique
- Arya Samaj in Singapore
- Arya Samaj in South Africa
- Arya Samaj in Suriname
- Arya Samaj in Tanzania
- Arya Samaj in Trinidad and Tobago
- Arya Samaj in Thailand
- Arya Samaj in Uganda

== See also ==
- Guru–shishya tradition
- Hindu reform movements
- Sampradaya
