= Tomb of Fatehpuri Begum =

Tomb in the Taj Mahal complex

Coordinates: 27°10′14″N 78°02′27″E

The Tomb of Fatehpuri Begum is a tomb located in the Taj Mahal complex. It was built by Mughal Emperor Shah Jahan for one of his wives, Fatehpuri Begum.

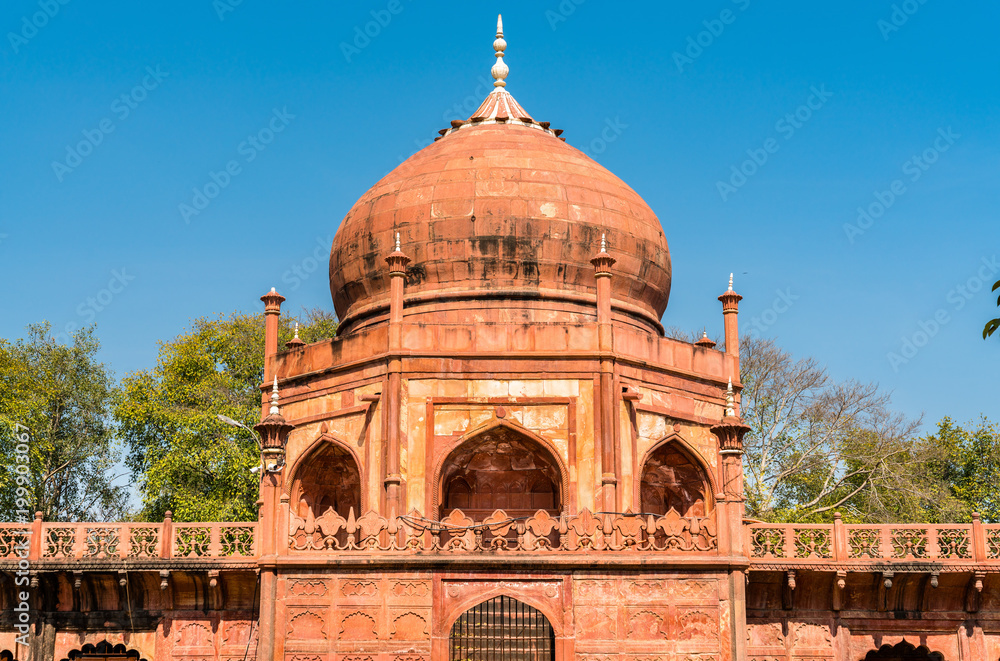
The Tomb of Fatehpuri Begum.

The tomb was built for Fatehpuri Begum, a consort of Shah Jahan. She was a patron of the arts who had built the Fatehpuri Mosque within the complex. According to Inayat Khan, one of the chroniclers of Shah Jahan's court, Fatehpuri Begum and Akbarabadi Mahal became especially favoured after the death of Mumtaz Mahal. During Shah Jahan's imprisonment at the Musamman Burj, she tended to the ailing emperor alongside Akbarabadi Mahal.

The tomb was built in the 1650s and lies opposite the similarly designed tomb of Akbarabadi Mahal in the forecourt of the entrance gate. it is one of the less visited monuments in the Taj Mahal, overshadowed by the mausoleum of Empress Mumtaz Mahal. The tomb is opposite to the Fatehpuri Mosque which was built by her in 1650. It contains a single white dome and twenty-four arches, standing on an elevated platform. It is surrounded by the intricate jali walls of its adjacent mosque.

== See also ==
- Fatehpuri Mosque
- Tomb of Sirhindi Begum
