= Tomb of Sirhindi Begum =

Tomb in the Taj Mahal

Coordinates: 27°10′32.205″N 78°2′38.859″E

The Tomb of Sirhindi Begum is a tomb located in the Taj Mahal complex. It was built by the Mughal emperor Shah Jahan for his third wife Izz-un-Nissa Begum, also known by her title Akbarabadi Mahal.

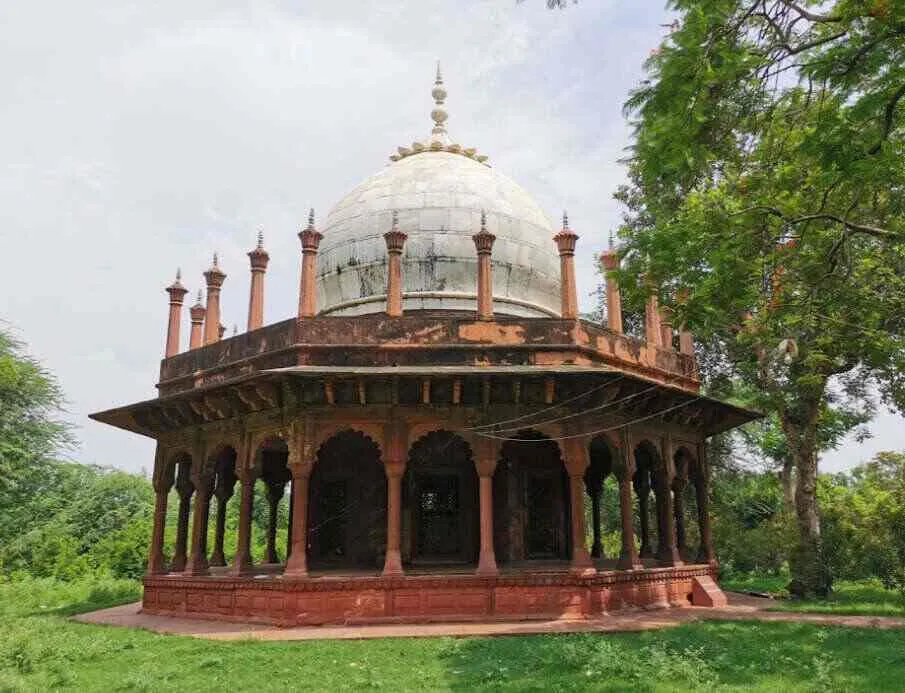
The tomb of Akbarabadi Mahal.

Izz-un-Nissa Begum was the third consort of Shah Jahan. She was the daughter of Shahnawaz Khan, who was made defacto commandar-in-chief of the southern islands by Jahangir. The wedding took place at Burhanpur on 2 September 1617. She gained significant favour during the later years of the emperor, becoming his most beloved consort since Mumtaz Mahal.

Located inside the enclosures in the Taj Mahal entrance courtyard are the tombs of Akbarabadi Mahal, Fatehpuri Begum, and Kandahari Begum. Akbarabadi's tomb most likely stood on a garden complex at the time.It is a domed structure standing on an elavated platform and has eight sides and twenty-four arches. The gate it's adjacent to is called the "Sirhi Darwaza" Her tomb is located at the southeast of the main gate, and includes a marble cenotaph inside.

== See also ==
- Tomb of Fatehpuri Begum
- Taj Mahal
- Akbarabadi Mosque
