= Abdullah Bukhari =

Indian imam (1922–2009)

Shahi Imam Jama Masjid, Delhi
- In office 8 July 1973 – 14 October 2000
- Preceded by: Hameed Bukhari
- Succeeded by: Ahmed Bukhari

Personal details
- Born: 1922 Rajasthan
- Died: 8 July 2009 at age 87 New Delhi, India
- Resting place: Delhi, India
- Occupation: Shahi Imam of Jama Masjid, Delhi

Abdullah Bukhari (Sayyid ʿAbdu l-Lāh Buxārī; 1922 – 8 July 2009) was the 12th Shahi Imam of the 17th-century Jama Masjid, Delhi, a sprawling complex located in the heart of Mughal-built Old Delhi district.

== Early life and career ==
He was born in Rajasthanand completed his Senior Cambridge from New Delhi and was appointed Naib-Shahi Imam in 1946. He was appointed to the office of the Shahi Imam on Sunday, 8 July 1973 AD after the Eleventh Shahi Imam Maulana Syed Hameed Bukhari.

The elderly Abdullah Bukhari had appointed his son Ahmed Bukhari as the Shahi Imam in 2000, and he started retreating from public arena of politics. At the same time, he continued to be somewhat politically active until his hospitalisation in 2009 just before his death.

== Association with politics ==
India's Prime minister Morarji Desai offered to him the position of Vice President of India after he won the 1977 elections defeating Indira Gandhi. He was one of the strong voices that opposed the Emergency in 1975. He protested against the targeting of Muslims when they were asked to undergo 'nasbandi' (vasectomy).

In 1977, he campaigned against the forced sterilisation drive in parts of Delhi by the then Congress government of Indira Gandhi.

== Death and legacy ==
Syed Abdullah Bukhari was hospitalized with breathing difficulties, as well as heart and kidney issues, on 9 June 2009. He died a month later, on 8 July 2009, at the All India Institutes of Medical Sciences, of a heart attack and was buried the same day in the family burial ground in the Walled city of Delhi. He was survived by four sons and two daughters.

Abdullah Bukhari is believed to have risked his life to rescue Muslims from rioters, following the Partition of India in 1947 Into India and Pakistan. He made arrangements for their relief and rehabilitation. During those troubled days, thousands of Delhi's Muslims were forced out of their homes by rioting mobs and had taken shelter in the large Jama Masjid, Delhi. He also encouraged them to remain in India and not to migrate to Pakistan.

Mufti Mukarram Ahmad, the Shahi Imam of nearby Fatehpuri Mosque reportedly said:

"Bukhari had been a fighter for 30 long years. The Imam was a great personality. He was a fearless man. He tried to pressurise the government to take up issues concerning the community".

For most of his life, he was India's most outspoken Muslim leader, defending the rights of Muslim minority in Hindu-majority India.

Religious titles
Preceded by Hameed Bukhari	Shahi Imam; Jama Masjid, Delhi; 8 July 1973 – 14 October 2000	Succeeded by Ahmed Bukhari
