= 2006 Jama Masjid bombings =

Terrorist incident in Old Delhi, India

Coordinates: 28.6507°N 77.2334°E

On 14 April 2006, two explosions occurred in the courtyard of Jama Masjid, a 17th-century mosque in Old Delhi (India). The first blast took place at 17:26 local time right in the middle of the courtyard next to Wazoo Khana which comprises a pond where worshipers wash their hands and feet before offering prayers, and the second a few meters away seven minutes later. At least thirteen people were injured in the blasts. The blasts took place just before the call to prayer (azaan). The explosives were reportedly carried in plastic bags. There were around 1000 people in the mosque at the time of blasts as the day happened to be Friday, considered holy by the Muslims as well as being the first Friday after Mawlid, the birthday of the Islamic prophet Muhammad. The explosions did not cause any damage to the mosque. The Delhi government announced an ex gratia compensation of Rs. 50,000 to those with serious injuries and Rs. 25,000 to those with minor injuries.

Some sources claim that the mosque was almost empty with only 100–150 people in the premises when the blast took place. The first blast occurred near Gate No. 1, a place where people wash their hands before offering prayers. It was the first attack of its kind on the historic mosque. It is being speculated that these blasts might be linked with coincidental six grenade attacks in Srinagar, that took place the same day.

According to Delhi police, these were "low-intensity blasts" triggered by crude explosives. The police have not ruled out terrorist involvement. As of 15 April 2006, no terrorist group had claimed the responsibility of the blasts. The Delhi police have arrested four people and are questioning them for the blasts.

Another school of thought suggests that the explosions could be the handiwork of some office bearers of the mosque due to internal rivalry.
