= Shaban Bukhari =

14th Shahi Imam of Jama Masjid, Delhi

14th Shahi Imam of Jama Masjid, Delhi
- Incumbent
- Assumed office 25 February 2024
- Appointed by: Syed Ahmed Bukhari
- Preceded by: Syed Ahmed Bukhari

Deputy Shahi Imam of Jama Masjid, Delhi
- In office 22 November 2014 – 25 February 2024
- Succeeded by: Syed Areeb Bukhari

Personal details
- Born: 11 March 1995 (age 31) Delhi, India
- Spouse: Shazia Bukhari
- Occupation: Shahi Imam of Jama Masjid, Delhi

Syed Usama Shaban Bukhari (born 11 March 1995) is the 14th Shahi Imam of the Jama Masjid, Delhi.

He was appointed Naib Imam of Jama Masjid on 22 November 2014 and is next in line to succeed his father. The dastarbandi ceremony took place in Jama Masjid, Delhi.

Later, on the occasion of Shab-e-Barat, 25 February 2024, he succeeded his father to be the 14th Shahi Imam, and will do imamat in absence of his father.

== Personal life ==
While pursuing Bachelor's Degree in Social Work from Amity University, Shaban married a Hindu girl from Ghaziabad, Uttar Pradesh with whom he was in a relationship for a couple of years. It was reported that she had agreed to convert to Islam and was also already learning Quran in 2015 before their marriage.

== Family ==
Born in Delhi, India, Syed Shaban Bukhari hails from the family of Islamic theologists who have since their past thirteen generations presided over the Grand Mosque "Jama Masjid", Delhi, India, built in the year 1656 by the Mughal Emperor Shah Jahan, who also commissioned the Taj Mahal. Shah Jahan appointed Syed Abdul Ghafoor Shah Bukhari, who was an ancestor of Syed Shaban Bukhari, as the First Imam of Jama Masjid Delhi and decreed that the Imamat shall continue in the same family.

Keeping the tradition, in the year 2014, Syed Shaban Bukhari was appointed as the Vice (Naib) Shahi Imam of Jama Masjid, Delhi, India, by his father, the Thirteenth Shahi Imam, Maulana Syed Ahmed Bukhari.

Religious titles
Preceded by Syed Ahmed Bukhari	Shahi Imam; Jama Masjid, Delhi; 25 February 2024	Succeeded by present
