= Ahmed Bukhari =

13th Shahi Imam of the Jama Masjid, Delhi

13th Shahi Imam of Jama Masjid, Delhi
- In office 14 October 2000 – 25 February 2024
- Preceded by: Abdullah Bukhari
- Succeeded by: Shaban Bukhari

Personal details
- Born: New Delhi, India
- Occupation: Shahi Imam of Jama Masjid, Delhi

Ahmed Bukhari is the 13th Shahi Imam of the Jama Masjid, Delhi.

== Ancestry and appointment ==
Ahmed Bukhari succeeded his father, Abdullah Bukhari, on 14 October 2000 as Shahi Imam of the Jama Masjid in Delhi. The outgoing Imam had served the Jama Masjid, Delhi for 55 years. After 1984 Sikh genocide in Delhi in the aftermath of Indira Gandhi assassination by her two Sikh security guards. The guards' motive for killing her was that she had earllier ordered the attack on their Golden Templein Amritsar, Punjab, India which is the holiest religious site for Sikhs. The outgoing Imam Abdullah Bukhari had sided with the Sikhs and had justified the Sikhs position on the matter.

In the meantime, Ahmed Bukhari has been a big crowd-puller and his recent protest rallies have been a great success over political issues. He was appointed the 'naib imam' in 1973 and the 13th Imam of Jama Masjid in 2000.

On 22 November 2014, his 19-years-old son and a college student, Shaban Bukhari, was formally designated to be the next Shahi Imam. As per traditions, Imams of Jama Masjid have declared their successors in their lifetimes.

Other nearly 200 invitees to the November 2014 ceremony (Dastaarbandi) included religious figures and diplomats from various countries. Jama Masjid, Delhi draws many tourists from foreign countries due to its 17th-century Mughal architecture.

== Controversy ==
In 2014, in an interview with The Times of India, on being asked on his decision of inviting Pakistani Prime Minister Nawaz Sharif but not Indian Prime Minister Narendra Modi to the naib imam anointment ceremony, Ahmed Bukhari defended his position saying, "Modi claims to be the Prime Minister of 125 crore Indians but conveniently and deliberately avoids addressing Muslims. He has shown he doesn't like us. He is the one who has been maintaining distance from the community. So, I too chose to maintain my distance."

Ahmed Bukhari reportedly stated:

"I had to heed the sentiments of Muslims. The community was never with Modi and only a miniscule section voted for him. Modi has not shown any remorse for the 2002 Gujarat riots. Rather than reaching out to the community, he has ignored us altogether in the last four months...He has indulged in divisive politics and not controlled hate mongering".

A criminal case was lodged against him along with Habib-ur-Rehman and Nafisa in 2001, after an incident on 3 September 2001, when a mob, led by Bukhari assaulted on-duty police and civic agencies officials trying to remove encroachments from near CGO Complex in Lodhi Colony. Warrants against Bukhari for this case have been issued repeatedly by the Delhi court. Delhi Police has been unable to arrest him because of communal tension for the past ten years.

During the 2015 U.P. Assembly Elections, Bukhari wrote a letter to Mulayam Singh Yadav of Samajwadi Party criticizing him for not nominating Muslim candidates to Rajya Sabha. In response, U.P. minister and senior Samajwadi Party leader Azam Khan alleged that Bukhari was accusing the Government of not giving equal rights to Muslims because he wanted his brother and son in law Umar Ali Khan to get Rajya Sabha tickets.

After the Dadri Lynching Case, Bukhari alleged that Azam Khan cannot go to the place of incident but was talking of going to United Nations to hide his incompetence. He also called Azam 'nihayat badtameez Muslim wazeer'. Azam Khan denied the charge and accused him of being hand-in-glove with Hindu right wing organizations.

Religious titles
Preceded by Abdullah Bukhari	Shahi Imam; Jama Masjid, Delhi; 14 October 2000	Succeeded by Shaban Bukhari
