= Mukarram Ahmad =

Indian Muslim religious and literary scholar

Mufti Mukarram Ahmad
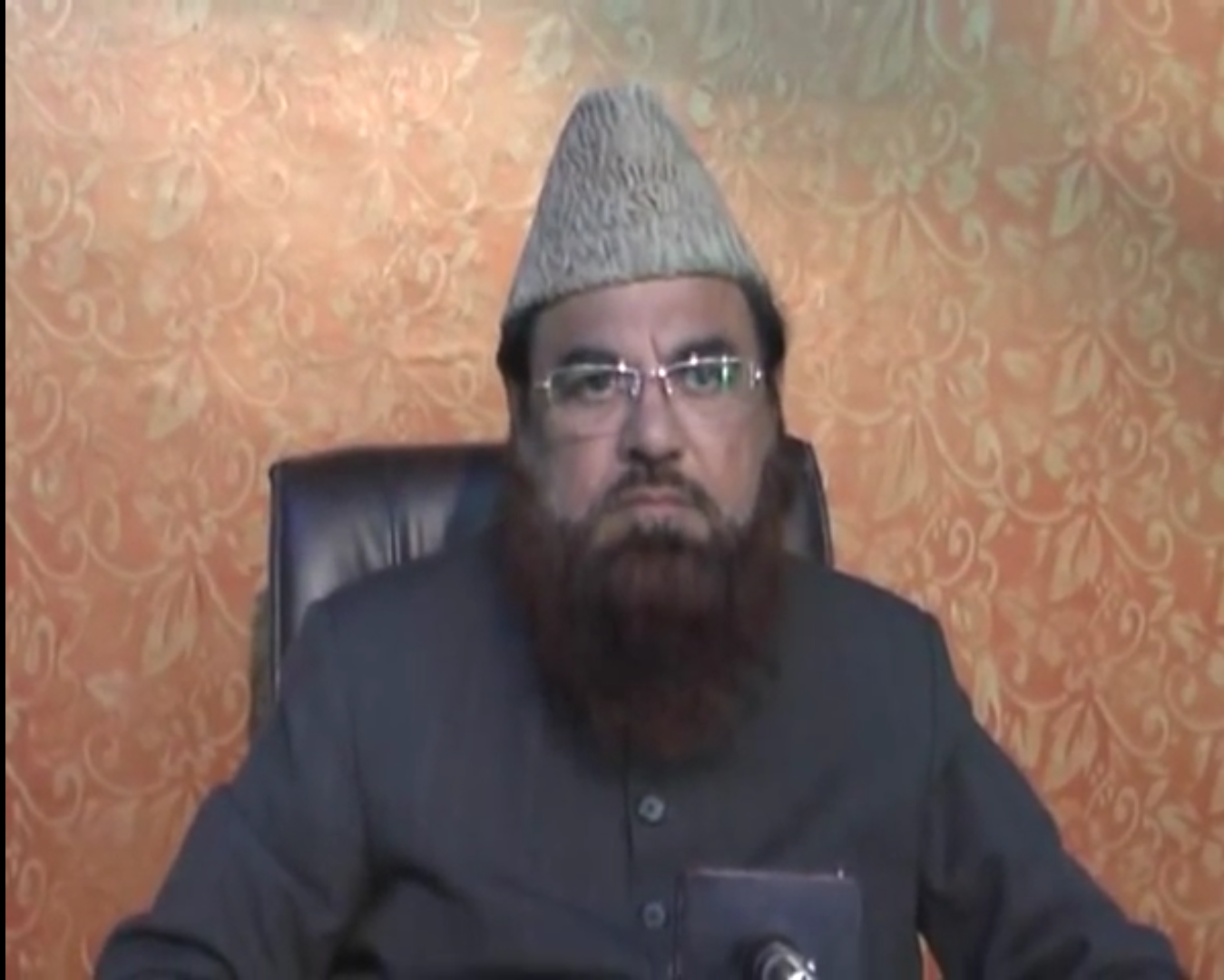
- Ahmed during an interview

Personal life
- Main interest(s): Islamic teachings, Arabic literature
- Occupation: Islamic scholar, Imam, Khateeb

Religious life
- Religion: Islam
- Denomination: Sunni
- Creed: Barelvi

Mufti Mukarram Ahmed is an Indian Muslim religious and literary scholar. Ahmad is the Shahi Imam (Royal prayer leader) and Khateeb (Prayer leader and main speaker) of Shahi Masjid Fatehpuri Mosque since 1971, Delhi, India's second largest mosque.

== Career ==
Mufti Mukarram subscribes to the Barelvi school of Sunni Islam which is adhered to by a vast majority of Indian as well as Pakistani Muslims in the sub-continent.

He is a scholar of Arabic, Urdu, Persian, English and Hindi and a Ph.D. in Modern Arabic Literature. He represents Muslims (Ahle Sunnat) on issues such as moon sighting and Eid celebration. It is the Oldest Committee of Delhi. Mufti Mukarram also represents Khankahe Aalia Naqshbandiya and he is Murshide Tariqat Silsila Nakshbandiya Mujaddidiya, Chishtiya, Qadriya and Sohrawardiya. He has written several books on Islamic teachings.

== His views on contemporary issues ==
=== Mob Lynching ===
Maulana Dr. Mufti Mohammed Mukarram Ahmed condemned mob lynching and demanded immediate action accused the government of not taking immediate action against mob lynching.

=== Citizenship Amendment Act 2019 ===
He supported protests against new Indian citizenship law and said that Protest is the only way of conveying our voice to the government. Any intensified protest will make people in power think about its impact on citizens.
