= Fatehpuri Begum =

Wife of Mughal emperor Shah Jahan

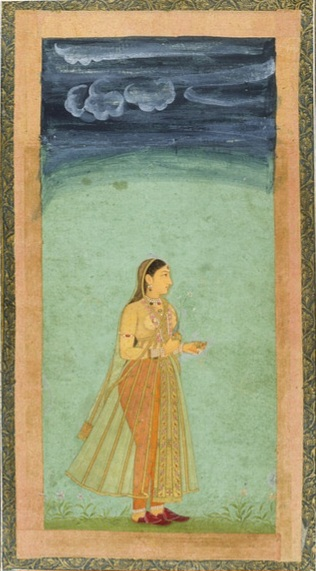
- Portrait of a consort holding a flower, likely Fatehpuri Begum. ca.17th century
- Born: Fatehpur Sikri, Mughal Empire
- Died: Agra, Mughal Empire
- Spouse: Shah Jahan
- House: Timurid (by marriage)
- Religion: Islam

Fatehpuri Begum, also known as Fatehpuri Mahal, was a consort of Mughal emperor Shah Jahan. She was his fifth wife and was known for her architectural contributions.

== Life ==
Fatehpuri Begum hailed from the city of Fatehpur Sikri, which was the Mughal capital during the reign of Emperor Akbar from 1571 to 1585. She and her family had come to Agra and settled in the city.

According to Waris, she entered the imperial harem as Shah Jahan's concubine. However, it remains unclear whether she was a legal wife or a concubine. She was most likely elevated to the position of consort later on. As was the tradition, upon entering the palace she received the title of "Fatehpuri Begum" corresponding to her native abode. She was a philanthropic and artistically inclined woman, and made many contributions to the city of Agra. Although Empress Mumtaz Mahal enjoyed exclusive favour, Fatehpuri seemed to have become significantly favoured by Shah Jahan after Mumtaz's death, and was especially favoured during his later years.

In 1650, she built a mosque in Delhi called the Fatehpuri Masjid, and the mosque in the Taj Mahal complex is also named after her. A defining feature of Fatehpuri's architectural taste was large or fluted central domes, which are present in the Fatehpuri Masjid and her tomb in the Taj Mahal complex. Near the precincts of the mosque, she built a madrasa called Madrasa Fatehpuri Begum. The tomb of Mumtaz Mahal's maidservant was also designed by Fatehpuri Begum.

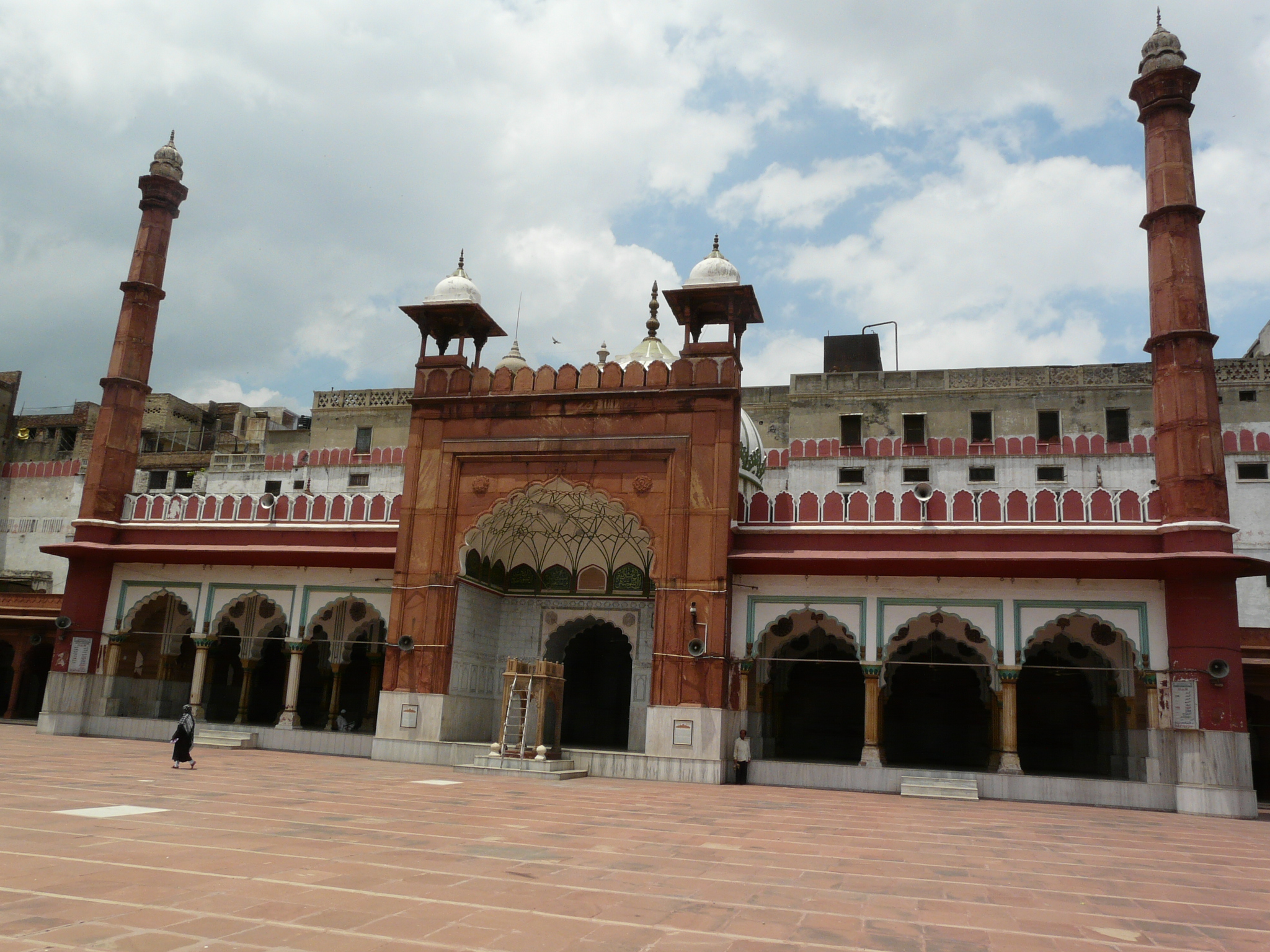
The Fatehpuri Mosque in Delhi.

During the time of Shah Jahan's imprisonment at the Musamman Burj, Fatehpuri Begum and Akabarabadi Mahal were his only surviving consorts. Both of the women chose to share his company, and took care of the ailing emperor. Fatehpuri Begum's exact death date is unknown. After her death, she was buried in a tomb close to Akbarabadi Mahal's tomb in the Taj Mahal complex.
