= Fatehpuri Mosque =

Mosque in Chandni Chowk, Old Delhi, Delhi, India

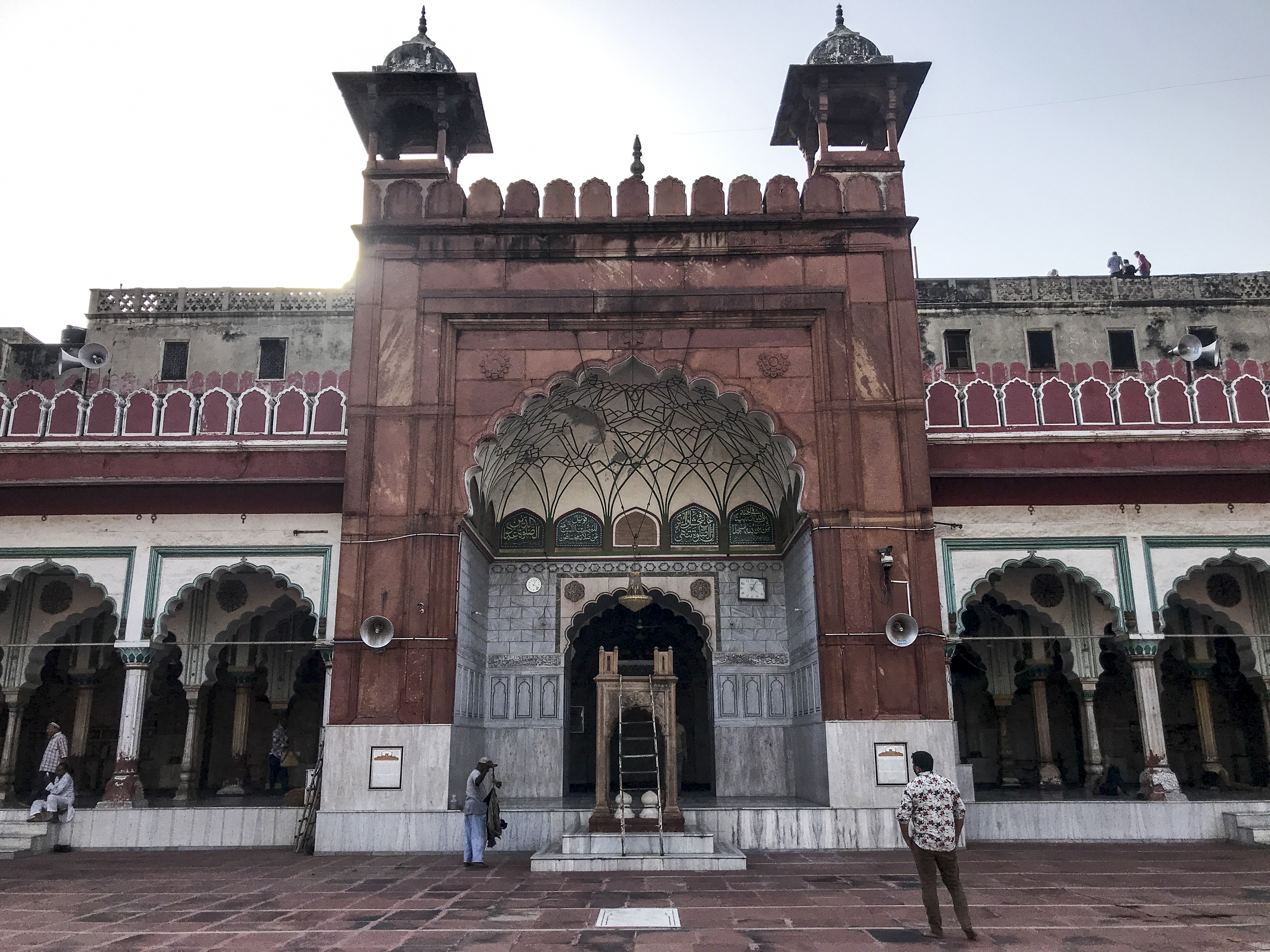
- The mosque façade and entrance, in 2018

- Location of the mosque in Central Delhi

Religion
- Affiliation: Sunni Islam
- Ecclesiastical or organisational status: Mosque (1650–1857); Profane use (1857–1877); Mosque (since 1877)
- Leadership: Mukarram Ahmad (imam)
- Status: Active

Location
- Location: Chandni Chowk, Old Delhi, Central Delhi
- Country: India
- Coordinates: 28°39′24″N 77°13′21″E

Architecture
- Type: Mosque architecture
- Style: Mughal
- Founder: Fatehpuri Begum (wife of Shahjahan)
- Completed: 1650

Specifications
- Dome: One (maybe more)
- Minaret: Two
- Spire: Two (maybe more)
- Materials: Red sandstone

The Fatehpuri Mosque, also Fatehpuri Masjid, is a 17th-century Sunni mosque, located at the western end of the oldest street of Chandni Chowk, in the Old Delhi neighbourhood of Delhi, India.

The mosque is opposite the Red Fort and, after Jama Masjid, is the second largest mosque in Delhi.

== History ==
The Fatehpuri Masjid was built in 1650 by Fatehpuri Begum and is named after her, one of the wives of Emperor Shah Jahan, who was from Fatehpur Sikri, and the mosque at Taj Mahal is also named after her.

The British auctioned the mosque after the 1857 war to Rai Lala Chunnamal for Rs. 19,000 (whose descendants still live in the Chunnamal haveli in Chandni Chowk), who preserved the mosque. Later in 1877 it was acquired by the Government in exchange for four villages and was restored to the Muslims at the Delhi Durbar when the British allowed the Muslims back in Old Delhi.

A similar mosque, built mainly for women worshippers, called Akbarabadi Mosque, built by the Akbarabadi Begum, her real name was Aiz-un-Nissa Begum, was destroyed by the British in 1857.

The Khari Baoli, which is today Asia's largest spice market, gradually developed after the construction of the mosque.

Mufti Mukarram Ahmad is the chief mufti and hereditary imam of the mosque, succeeding his father, Maulana Mufti Mohammad Ahmad (d. 1391 AH (1971/1972 CE)).

According to a major newspaper of India:

"In former times, the mosque was not encroached upon by shops that are such an eyesore now. But there is a practical reason for having them there because of the income they bring to the trust that looks after the mosque and without which its upkeep would be difficult...During the Moghul days , there were beautiful fountains inside the mosque and a huge central water tank".

The grave of the wife of Great Freedom Fighter and Muslim leader Maulana Abdul Qadir Ludhianvi is located in the courtyard of the Fatehpuri Mosque.

== Architecture ==
The mosque is built using red sandstone and has a fluted dome with mahapadma and kalash finials. Flanked by twin minarets, the mosque has a traditional design with the prayer hall having seven-arched openings. The mosque has single and double-storeyed apartments on the sides.

The central iwan in the middle is flanked by three arches on each side.

== Gallery ==
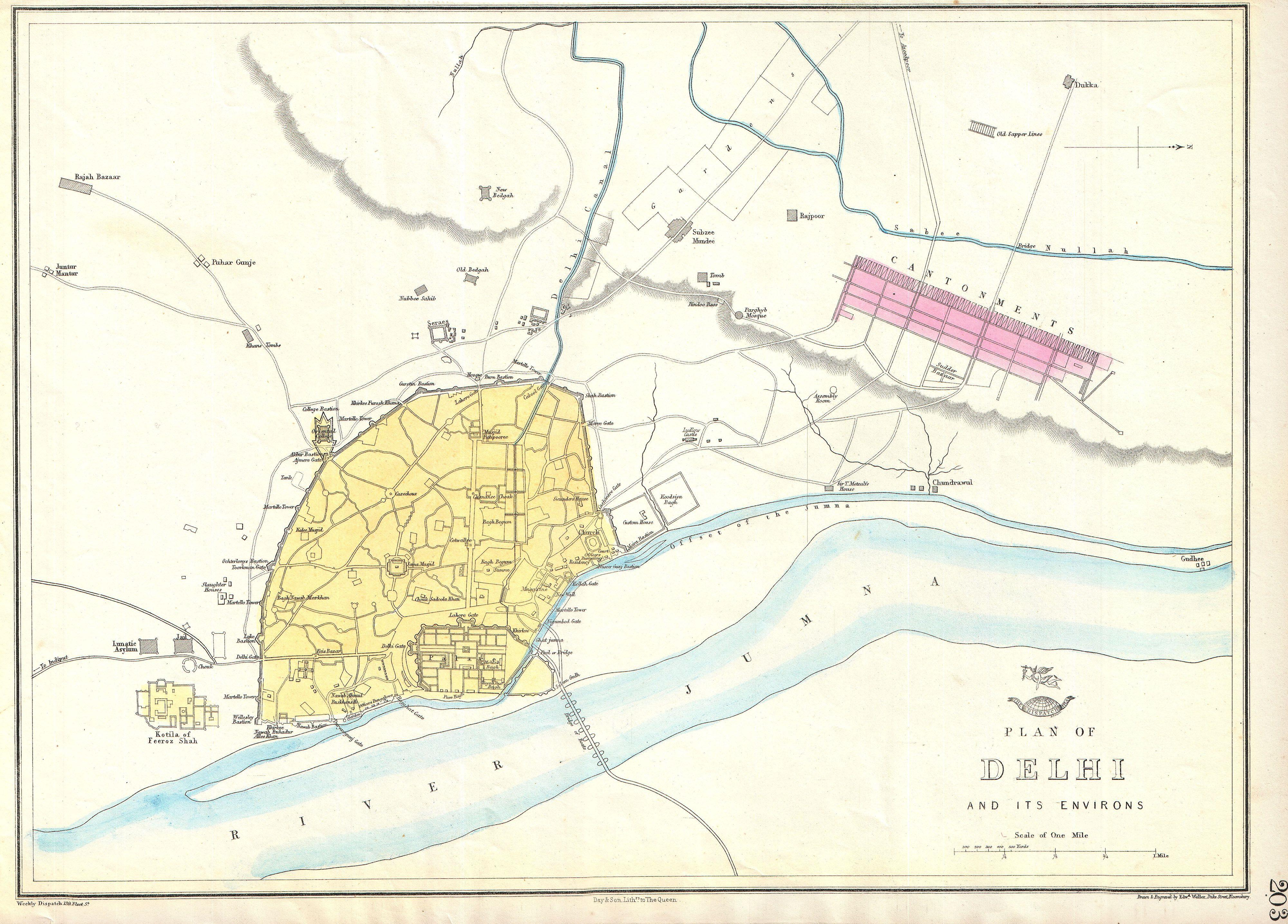
1863 map of Shahjahanabad (Old Delhi). Musjid Futtepoori is south of the Lahauri Gate, in the north.

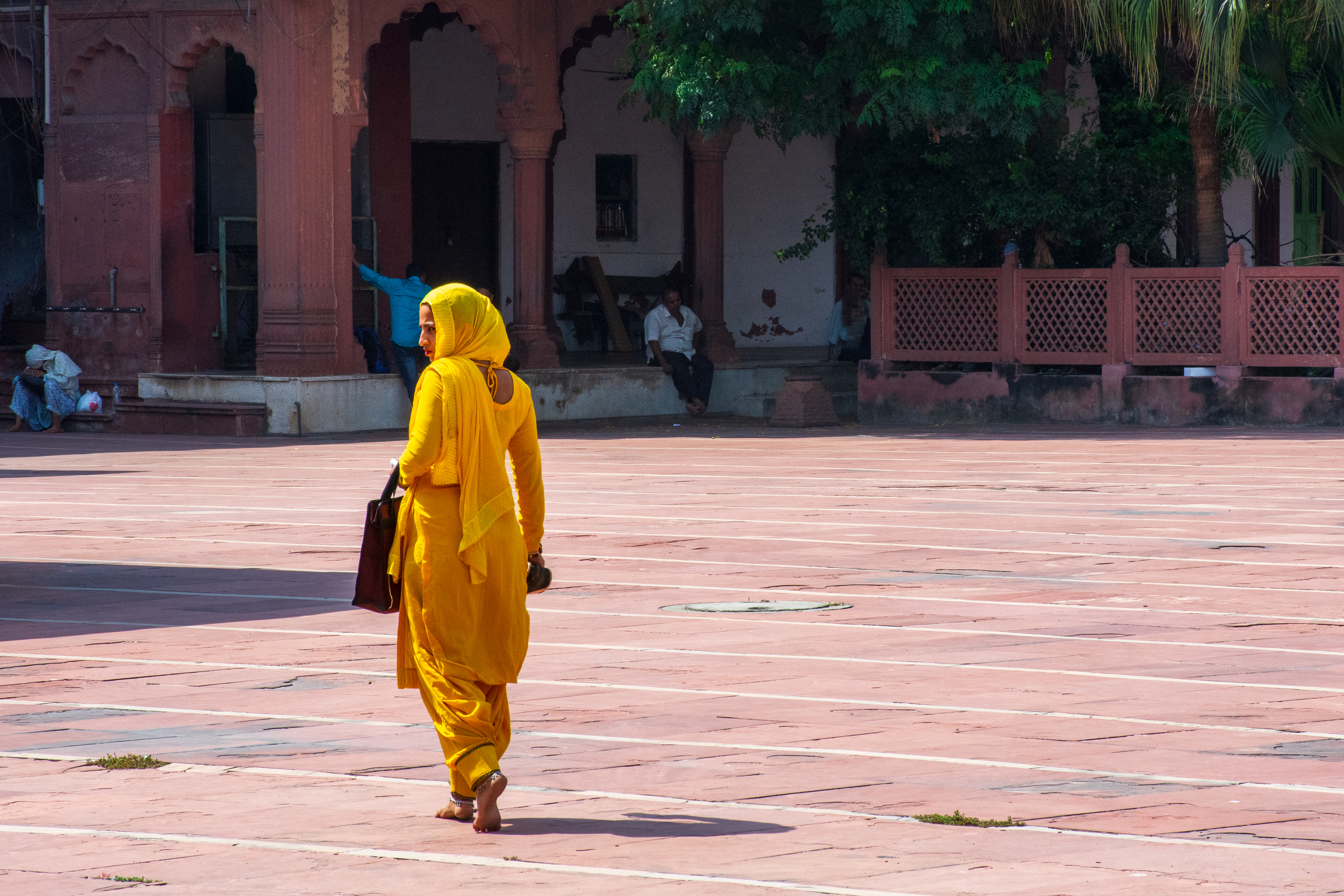
A visitor crosses the courtyard of Fatehpuri Masjid, Old Delhi. Shoes removed at entrance per mosque custom.1863 map of Shahjahanabad (Old Delhi). Musjid Futtepoori is south of the Lahauri Gate, in the north.

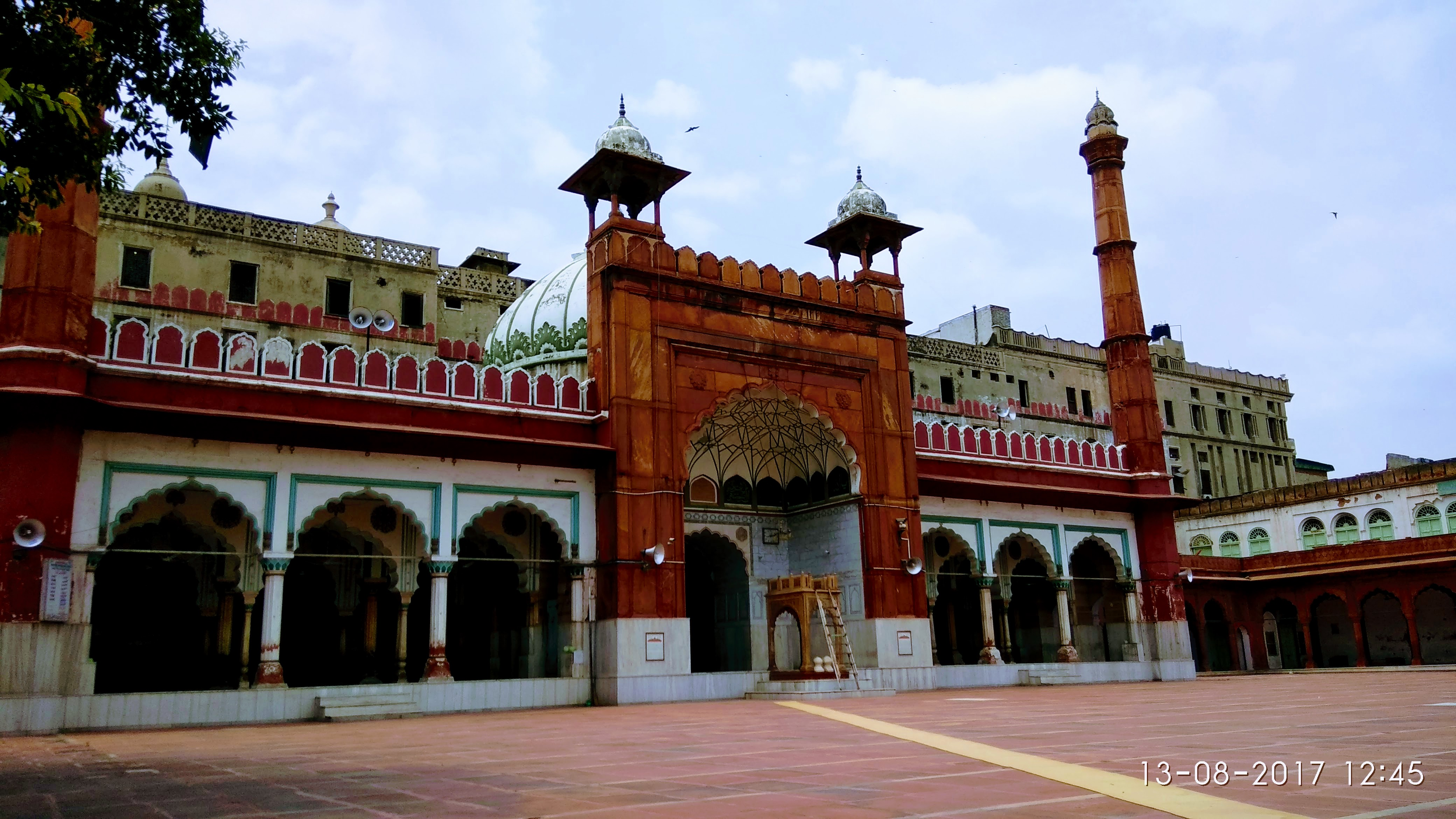
The mosque in 2017

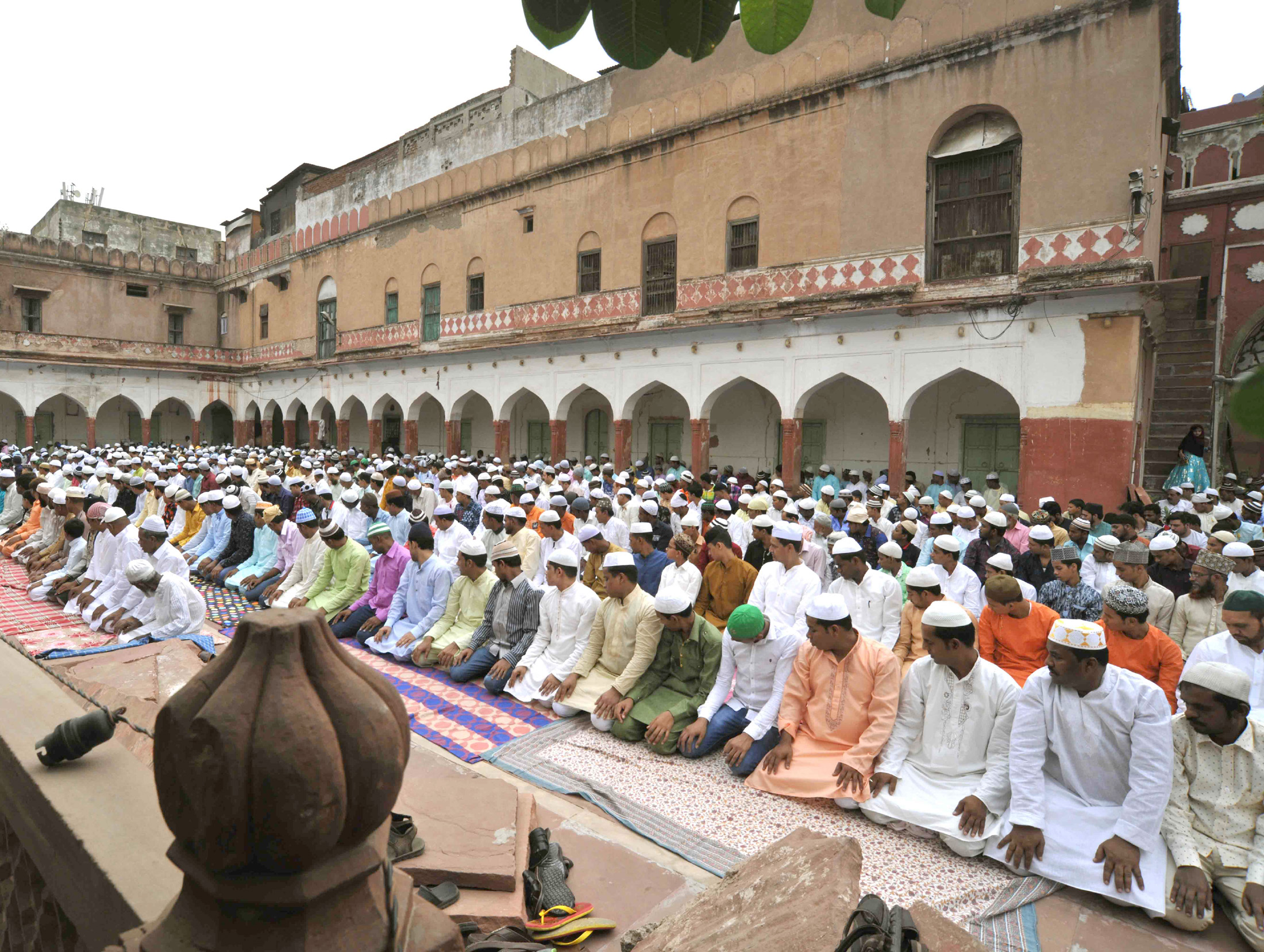
Worshippers offering namaz during Idu’l Fitr, 1439 AH (2017/2018 CE)

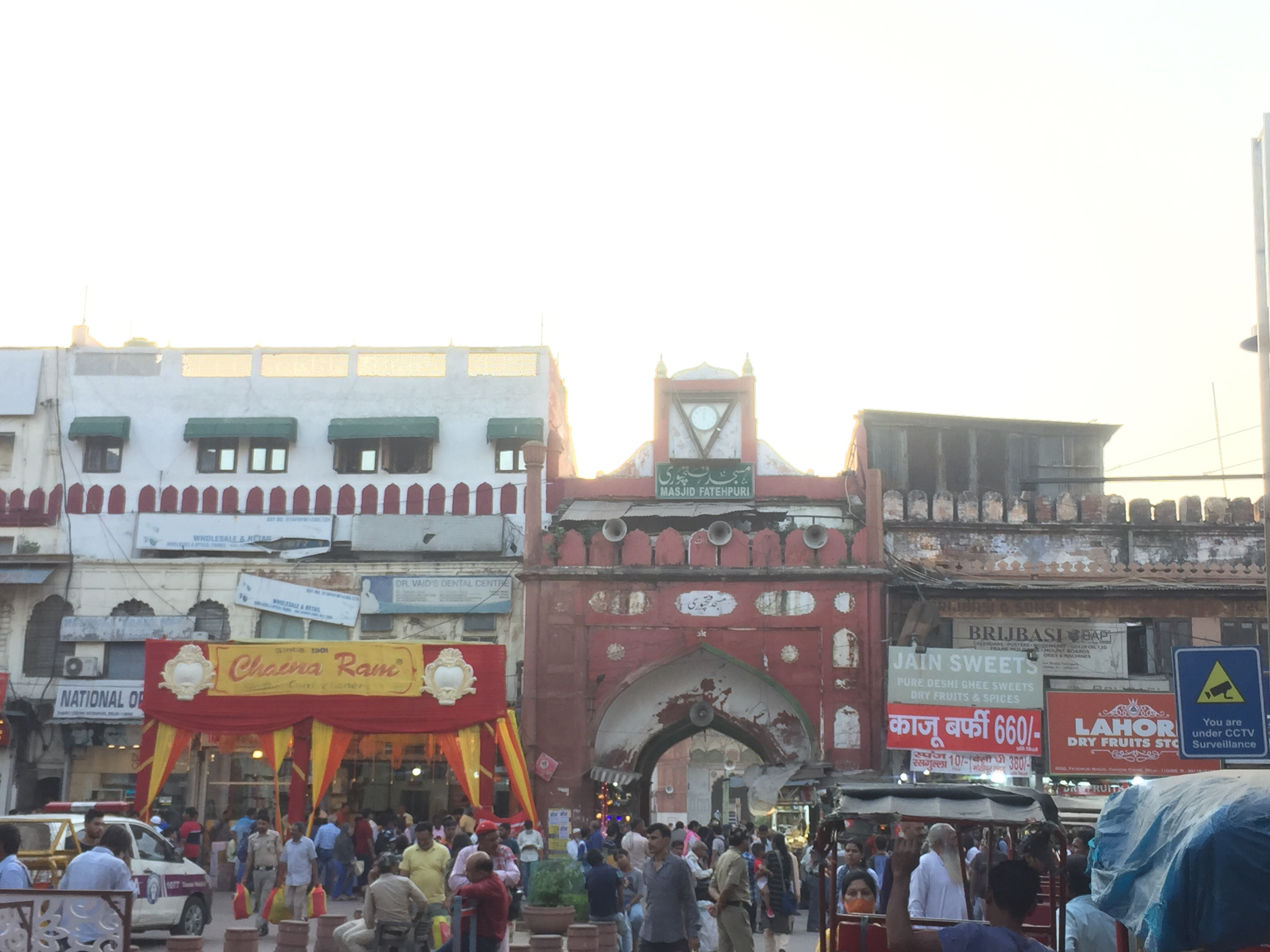
The view from the mosque towards the old Delhi market

== See also ==
- Islam in India
- List of mosques in India
