= Akbarabadi Mosque =

Former mosque in Delhi, India

- Urdu: اکبر آبادی مسجد
- Location of the former mosque in Central Delhi

Religion
- Affiliation: Islam (former)
- Ecclesiastical or organisational status: Mosque (1650–1857)
- Status: Destroyed

Location
- Location: Old Delhi, Delhi
- Country: India
- Coordinates: 28°39′00″N 77°14′16″E

Architecture
- Type: Mosque architecture
- Style: Indo-Islamic; Mughal
- Founder: Akbarabadi Mahal
- Completed: 1650
- Destroyed: 1857 (by the British Raj)

The Akbarabadi Mosque (Urdu: اکبر آبادی مسجد) was a mosque, located in the Old City of Delhi, India. It was built by Akbarabadi Mahal, one of Shah Jahan's wives in 1650. One of the several Mughal era mosques in Old Delhi, it was demolished by the British, following their recapture of Delhi during the 1857 Uprising. It is believed to have existed in modern-day Netaji Subhash Park locality of Old Delhi.

== History ==
Akbarabadi Masjid was built by one of Shah Jahan's wives, Akbarabadi Begum. Built in 1650, it took two years to complete. The famed Muslim Scholar Shah Abdul Qadir Dehlavi, one of the sons of Shah Waliullah Dehlavi, is said to have written the first ever translation of the Quran from Arabic to native Urdu at the site of the present Akbarabadi Masjid. During its existence, it was one of the many mosques built by Royal Mughal females in Shahjahanabad, like the Fatehpuri Masjid, Zeenat-ul Masjid, and others.

=== 1857 Uprising ===
The mosque was reportedly standing a good two centuries after its creation, before it fell to the British wrath in the aftermath of the 1857 Uprising. The uprising of 1857 is one of the most important and decisive events in the history of British India. Delhi, the capital of the Mughals, was the epicentre of the Uprising, which began in the army units posted around Delhi. While initially successful, the revolt subsequently withered away, due to many reasons, including lack of leadership and coordination, spying by local Indians for the British, etc.. Delhi was the last landmark of 1857 to be captured back by the British. To quell the dissent against British rule from spreading further and prevent it from resurfacing, the British destroyed hundreds of structures in Old Delhi. The Mughal capital bore the wrath of the British reaction. Any structure that was used as the mutiny base by the sepoys was destroyed.

Akbarabadi Masjid was one of the mutiny bases which was demolished by the British forces. Its existence has since been legendary and passed on generation after generation. It is not known where the mosque exactly stood, though many local Muslim residents of Netaji Subhash Park in Old Delhi consider one particular site to be the possible ground where the mosque once stood.

The debris from the demolished mosque was put on sale and somehow found a noble buyer in Syed Ahmed Khan, who bought the debris and used it in the construction of the Sir Syed Mosque and Aligarh Muslim University.

== Possible discovery ==
On 6 July 2012, while digging earth in Netaji Subhash Park area to construct a Metro station, the officials of the DMRC came across remains of some medieval era construction buried underground. After investigation by the Archaeological Survey of India (ASI), it was confirmed that the remains belong to the Mughal era, due to the material used, the style of construction, and excavations from the site, including pottery. It was, however, not ascertained if the remains were those of Akbarabadi Masjid or are a part of it. The ASI stated that its investigations to establish the exact identity of the ruins were ongoing. The digging by DMRC was suspended. It was part of Delhi Metro's Phase-3 plan and minor modification to the route may have to be done to adhere to the ASI construction norms in protected heritage areas.

The discovery triggered excitement among local residents, who believed that the remains belong to Akbarabadi Masjid. Following the construction of an illegal brick structure – which endangered the integrity of the ASI excavations – Muslim residents started offering namaaz at the site of the ruins. Soon after the discovery, the local MLA, Shoaib Iqbal, began supervising re-construction of the mosque at the same site but it was stopped after orders from the Delhi government. This led to stone pelting and minor arson when the police tried to remove copies of the Quran and some prayer mats from the site.

The local civic agency, the North Delhi Municipal Corporation (NDMC), initially banned any activity except offering namaaz at the site. However, on 20 July 2012 the Delhi High Court issued a ban on any construction and religious activities at the site, reasoning that it was not yet ascertained if the site belonged to some ancient mosque and that for over a century has no religious activity been carried out at the site. The Court also ordered the NDMC to hand over the land to ASI for its investigations to begin. On 25 July 2012 the site was handed over to ASI but the archaeology body said that it would start excavating the site only after the monsoons. Heavy police cover shall be provided to ASI during its work. Following request by ASI, the Delhi High Court on 30 July 2012 ordered the NDMC to demolish the illegal construction and asked for heavy policing to maintain law and order. On 11 October 2012, after much delay due to monsoons, the NDMC sought paramilitary cover in a bid to start the demolition drive at the site.

== See also ==
- Islam in India
- List of mosques in India
