= Jama Masjid, Delhi =

Mosque in Delhi, India

Jama Masjid
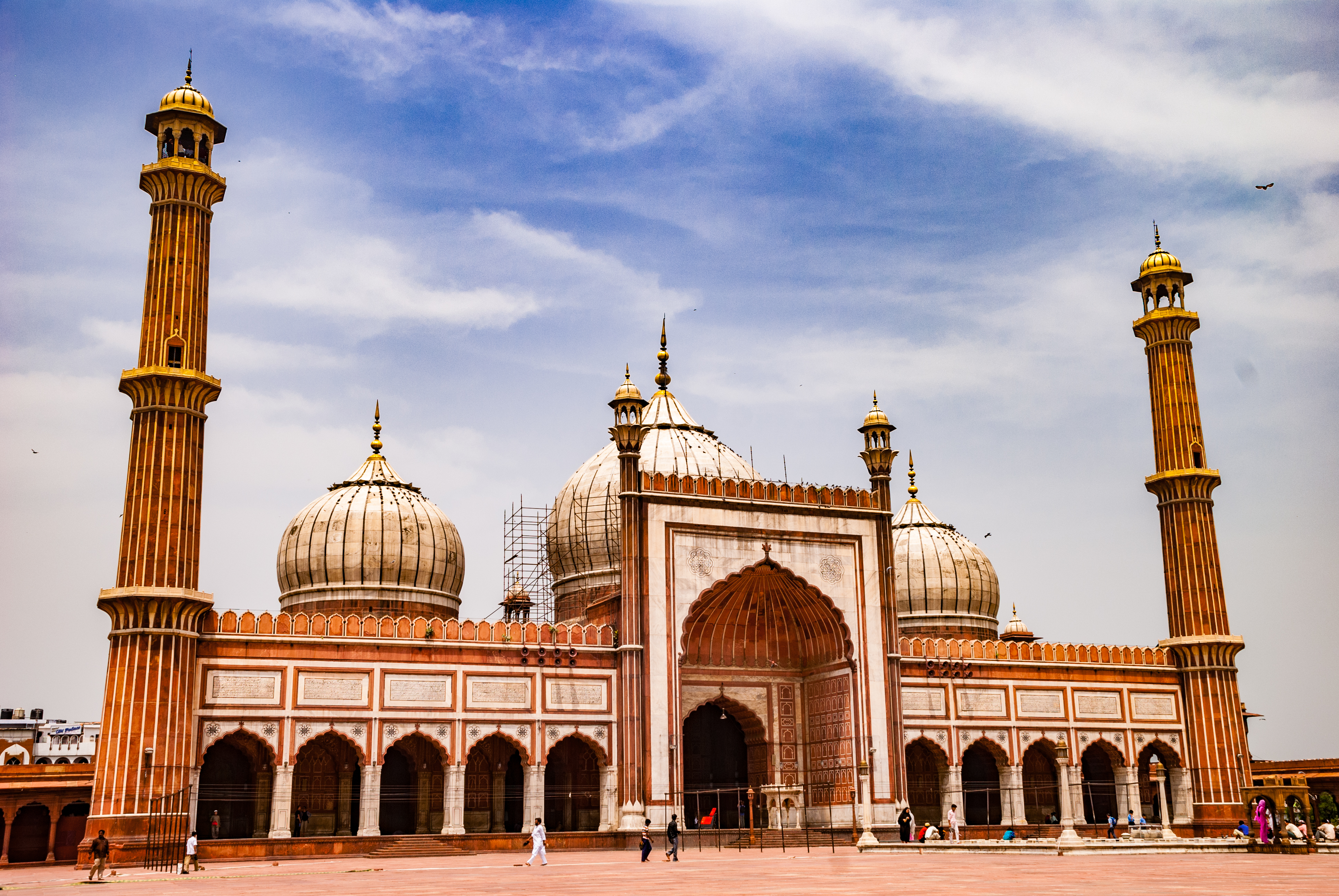
- The mosque exterior, in 2008

- Location of the mosque in Central Delhi

Religion
- Affiliation: Sunni Islam
- Rite: Hanafi
- Ecclesiastical or organisational status: Congregational mosque
- Leadership: Syed Ahmed Bukhari (Shahi Imam); Syed Shaban Bukhari (Naib Shahi Imam)
- Status: Active

Location
- Location: Old Delhi, Central Delhi
- Country: India
- Coordinates: 28°39′03″N 77°14′00″E

Architecture
- Type: Mosque
- Style: Indo-Islamic; Mughal
- Completed: 1656; 370 years ago
- Construction cost: ₹1 million

Specifications
- Direction of façade: West
- Capacity: 25,000 worshippers
- Length: 40 metres (130 ft)
- Width: 27 metres (89 ft)
- Dome: 3
- Minaret: 2
- Minaret height: 41 metres (135 ft)
- Materials: Red sandstone, marble

Website
- Jama Masjid

Monument of National Importance
- Official name: Ancient Mosque
- Reference no.: N-DL-162

The Masjid-i-Jehan-Numa, commonly known as the Jama Masjid, in Old Delhi area of Delhi, is one of the largest mosques in India. Its builder was the Mughal emperor Shah Jahan, between 1644 and 1656, and it was inaugurated by its first Imam, Syed Abdul Ghafoor Shah Bukhari. Situated in the Mughal capital of Shahjahanabad (today Old Delhi), it served as the imperial mosque of the Mughal emperors until the demise of the empire in 1857. The Jama Masjid was regarded as a symbolic gesture of Mughal power across India. It was also a site of political significance during several key periods of British rule. It remains in active use, and is one of Delhi's most iconic sites, closely identified with the methods of Old Delhi. The mosque structure is a Monument of National Importance.

== Names ==
The mosque has two names. The older one, bestowed by Shah Jahan, is Masjid-i-Jehān-Numā, interpreted as "mosque that reflects the whole world", probably an allusion to the Jām-e-Jehān Numā. The other more common one is Jāmā Masjid (Urdu: جامع مسجد, from the Arabic meaning "congregational mosque"), which emerged among the common populace. The term Jama Masjid is not unique to this mosque; since the 7th century, it has been used to denote the community mosque or Friday mosque, and hence many around the world bear this name and variants of it.

== Location ==
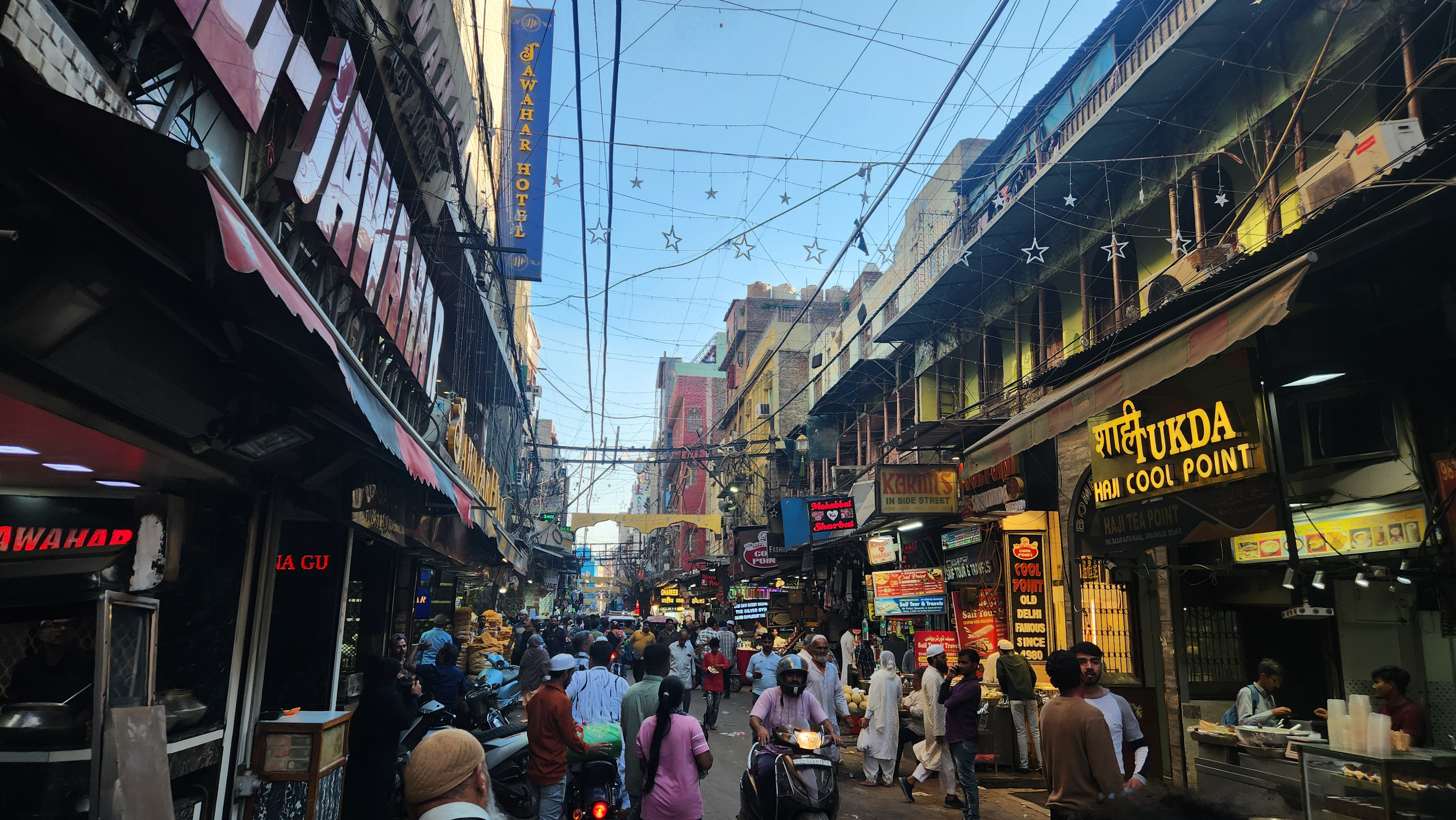
Old Delhi market opposite Jama Masjid, Delhi

The mosque is located within the historic city of Shahjahanabad, today known as the locality of Old Delhi. Across from the mosque are the Red Fort and Sunehri Masjid. As one of the focal points of Old Delhi, Jama Masjid is surrounded by various commercial centres, such as the historic Chandni Chowk. The tomb of Abul Kalam Azad, Indian independence activist, is located adjacent to the mosque.

== History ==
=== Construction and Mughal era ===
Mughal emperor Shah Jahan built the Jama Masjid between 1650 and 1656, at the highest point of Shahjahanabad. It was constructed by approximately 5,000 workers. The workforce was diverse, consisting of Indians, Arabs, Persians, Turks, and Europeans. The construction was supervised primarily by Sadullah Khan, the wazir (or prime minister) during Shah Jahan's reign, and Fazil Khan, the comptroller of Shah Jahan's household. The cost of the construction at the time was ten lakh (one million) rupees. The mosque was inaugurated on 23 July 1656 by Syed Abdul Ghafoor Shah Bukhari, from Bukhara, Uzbekistan. He had been invited by Shah Jahan to be the Shahi Imam (Royal Imam) of the mosque.

The mosque was one of the last monuments built under Shah Jahan. After its completion, it served as the royal mosque of the emperors until the end of the Mughal period. The khutba was recited by the Mughal emperor during the Friday noon prayer, legitimising his rule. The mosque was hence a symbol of Mughal sovereignty in India, carrying political significance. It was also an important centre of social life for the residents of Shahjahanabad, providing a space transcending class divide for diverse people to interact. In 1757, the khutba was read in the name of Ahmad Shah Durrani, the Afghan conqueror who was invited to Delhi by Emperor Alamgir II.

=== British rule ===
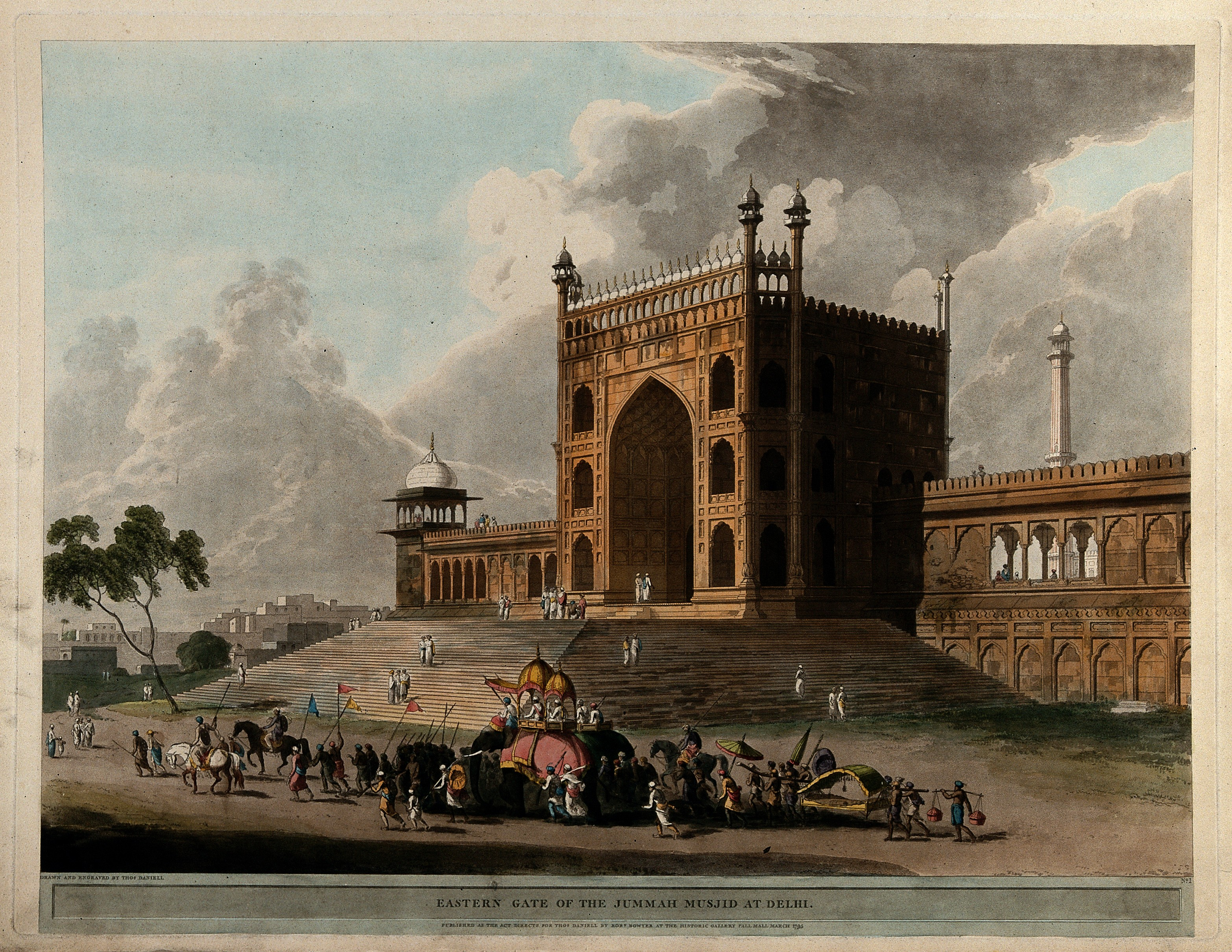
Eastern gate of the Jami Masjid, painted in 1795 by Thomas Daniell

The British took over Shahjahanabad in 1803. The Mughal Emperor remained the ritual imperial head of the mosque, but Mughal power and patronage had significantly waned. The initial policy of the British in the city was favourable towards its residents; the British undertook repairs and even renovations of the Jama Masjid. The Masjid continued to serve as a site of social and political discourse, in keeping with other mosques of Delhi at the time; for example, theological and philosophical debates were held between Muslims and Christians.

The Revolt of 1857 was a major turning point in this situation. This event resulted in the deaths of many British people in the city, and weakened colonial authority, deeply affronting the British. It also ended the Mughal empire. The British perceived the revolt as instigated by Muslims, cultivated within Delhi's mosques. After the British reclaimed the city in the same year, they razed many mosques and banned the congregation of Muslims in any remaining mosques. The Jama Masjid fell into British confiscation during this time, and was barred from any religious use. It was repeatedly considered for destruction, but the British eventually began using it as barracks for its Sikh and European soldiers. This was a desecration of the space; scholar Sadia Aziz characterises the decision as deliberate, in order to insult the sentiments of the city's Muslim inhabitants.

The Masjid was eventually returned to the Muslim population in 1862, due to their increasing resentment of British actions. Multiple conditions were imposed, including the usage of Jama Masjid as strictly a religious site, as well as mandatory policing by the British. The Jama Masjid Managing Committee (JMMC), consisting of respected Muslims of Delhi, was established as a formal body to represent the mosque and enforce these conditions.

Upon its return, the Jama Masjid was reestablished as a mosque. Though the Mughal state had been dissolved, the mosque received patronage from various regional Islamic rulers and nobles. In 1886, the Nawab of Rampur donated a large sum of 1,55,000 rupees to facilitate repairs. In 1926, a donation from the Nizam of Hyderabad of 1,00,000 rupees was used for similar purposes.

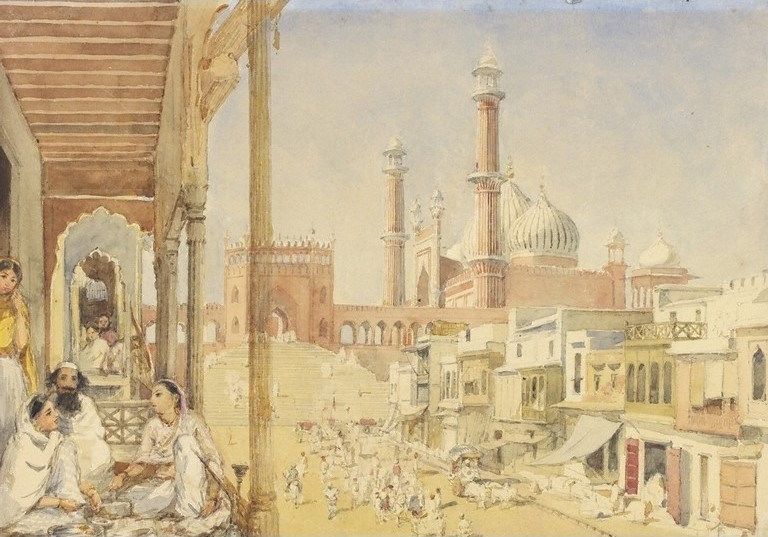
Jama Masjid in 1852, as seen from the adjacent Urdu Bazaar.

Growing unrest against British rule manifested in Delhi's mosques from 1911. The Jama Masjid was frequently used for non-religious, political purposes, against the rules instituted. While the British could police and clamp down on political activities in public spaces, the Jama Masjid was a religious space and was hence protected from such action, by both law (Religious Endowment Act, 1863) and the sentiments of Delhi. Hindus often gathered with Muslims in the mosque to express anti-colonial solidarity, in spite of simmering tension between the communities in the colonial period.

=== Post-Colonial era ===
The Jama Masjid continued to be a political symbol after independence. Indian independence activist Abul Kalam Azad delivered a speech from its pulpit during the Thursday (Jumerat) prayers of 23 October 1947. The Partition of India was underway, causing massive population movements in Delhi. Azad implored the Muslims of Delhi to remain in India, and attempted to reassure them that India was still their homeland.

During 1948, the last Nizam of Hyderabad, Asaf Jah VII was asked for a donation of 75,000 rupees to repair one-fourth of the mosque floor. The Nizam instead sanctioned 3,00,000 rupees, stating that the remaining three-fourths of the mosque should not look old.

The mosque served as a site of significance with regards to the infamously communal Babri Masjid dispute. Abdullah Bukhari, the Shahi Imam of the Jama Masjid at the time, made several speeches in 1986 regarding the issue from the Masjid, condemning the political support given to the Hindu cause and mobilising Muslim sentiments. In one instance this ignited riots and clashes in Old Delhi. In 1987, Jama Masjid was the staging point for a major peaceful protest regarding the Babri Masjid dispute. On 28 May 1987, amidst rising communal tensions and riots all over India, the Jama Masjid was closed by the Imam and adorned in black cloth, symbolising Muslim resentment of government actions at the time. The decision was highly controversial among Islamic leadership.

=== Modern era ===
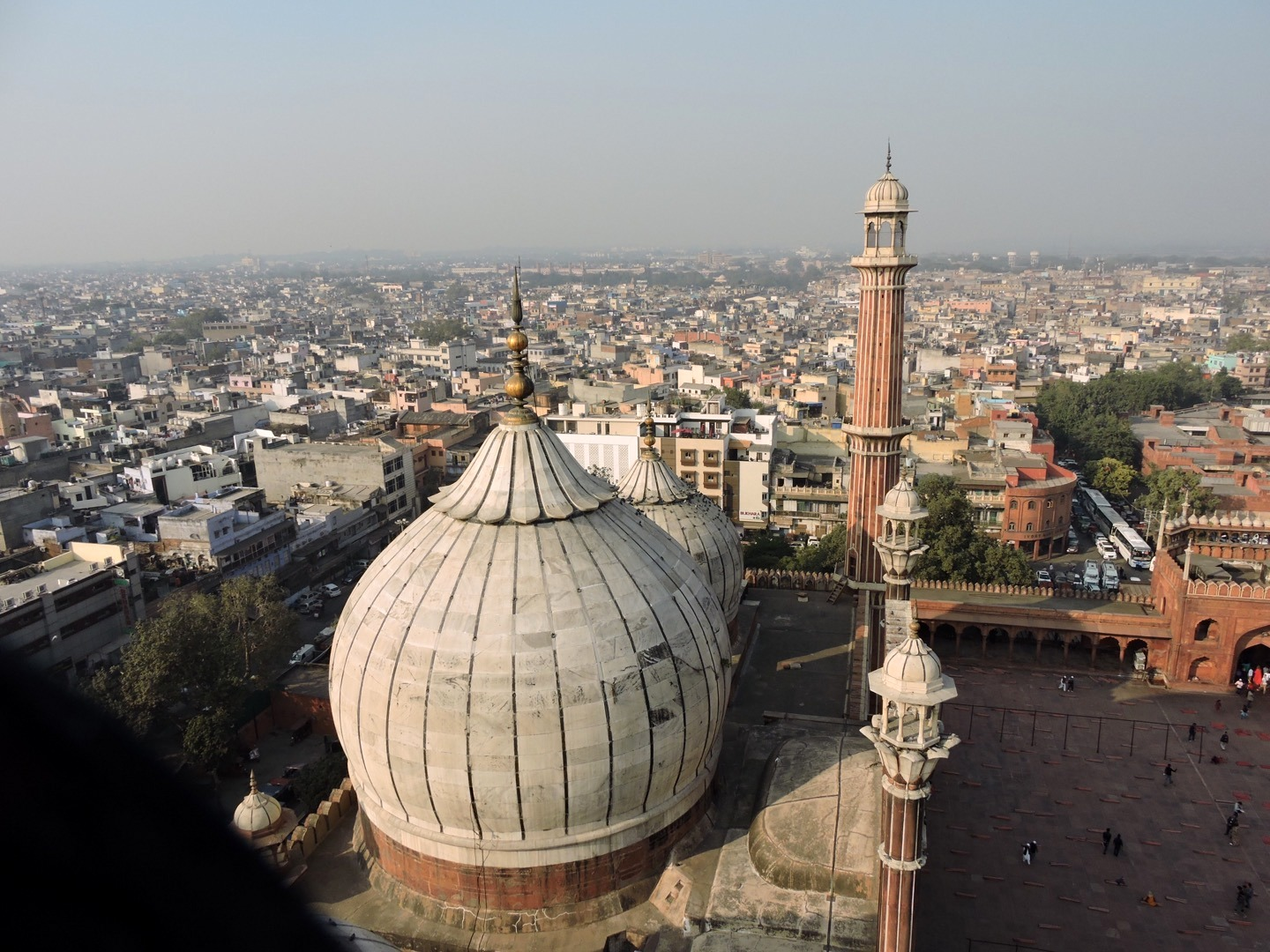
View of Delhi from the mosque's domes. Jama Masjid has been an enduring symbol of Delhi throughout its history.

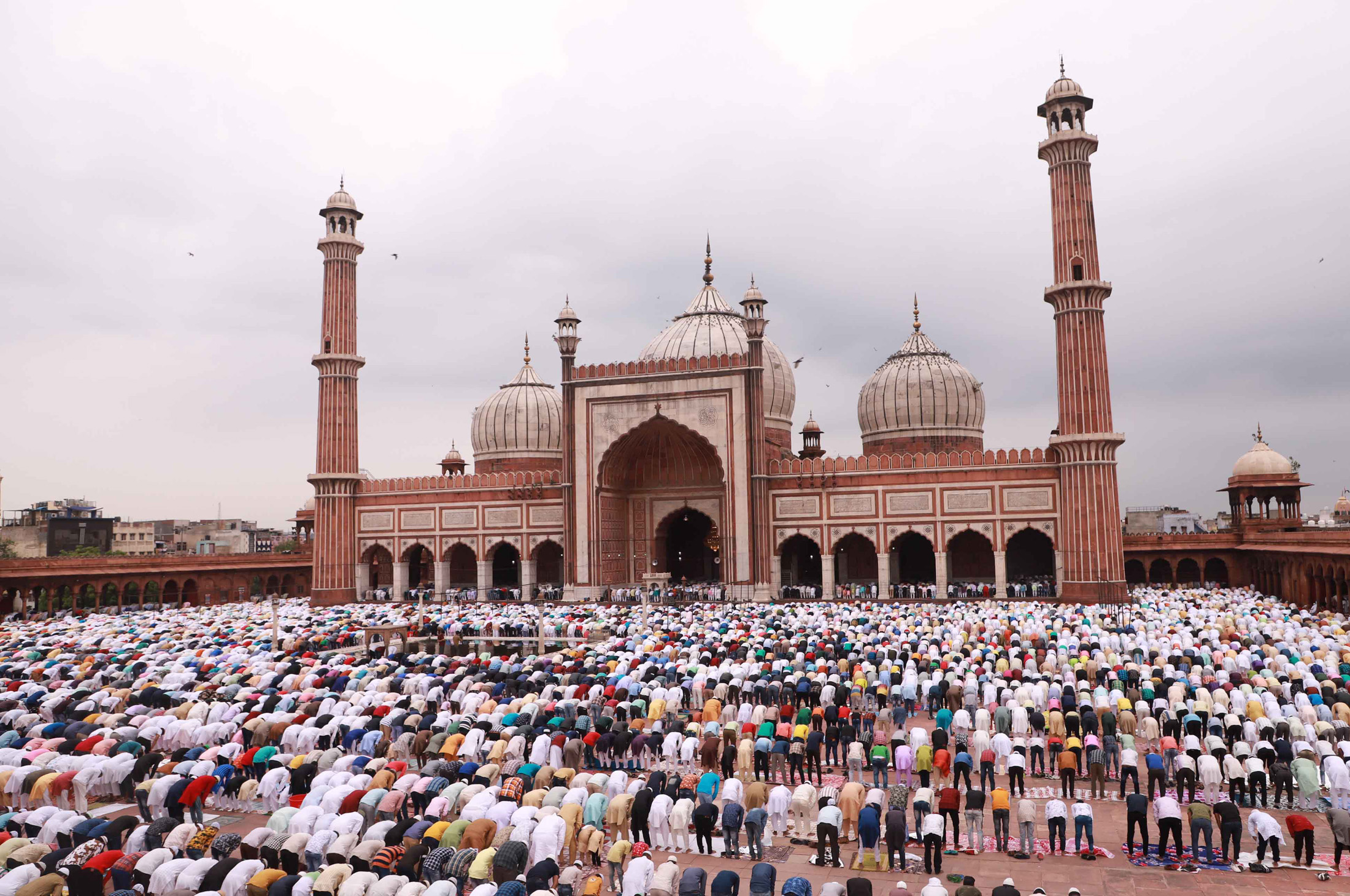
People offering Namaz on the occasion of Id-ul-Zuha, in 2019

The Jama Masjid serves as Delhi's primary mosque, and has a largely congregational function. The Muslims of the city traditionally gather here to offer communal Friday prayer, as well as for major festivals such as Eid. The mosque is also a major tourist attraction, and derives a significant amount of income through the visits of foreigners.

The function of the mosque as an autonomous political space has continued in the modern era. For example, in 2001 (in the aftermath of the 9/11 attacks) the mosque was a site of protest against U.S bombings in Afghanistan. In 2019, massive protests occurred at the site due to the controversial Citizenship Amendment Act.

==== Renovation ====
In 2006, it was reported that the mosque was in urgent need of repair, following which the Saudi Arabian king Abdullah offered to pay for it. The Imam said that he had received the offer directly from the Saudi authorities, but requested them to approach the Indian Government. However, the Delhi High Court said that this matter had no "legal sanctity" giving no "special equities" to the Imam.

A project aiming to renovate the Jama Masjid and its surroundings has remained unimplemented since the early 2000s, due to several administrative and logistical roadblocks.

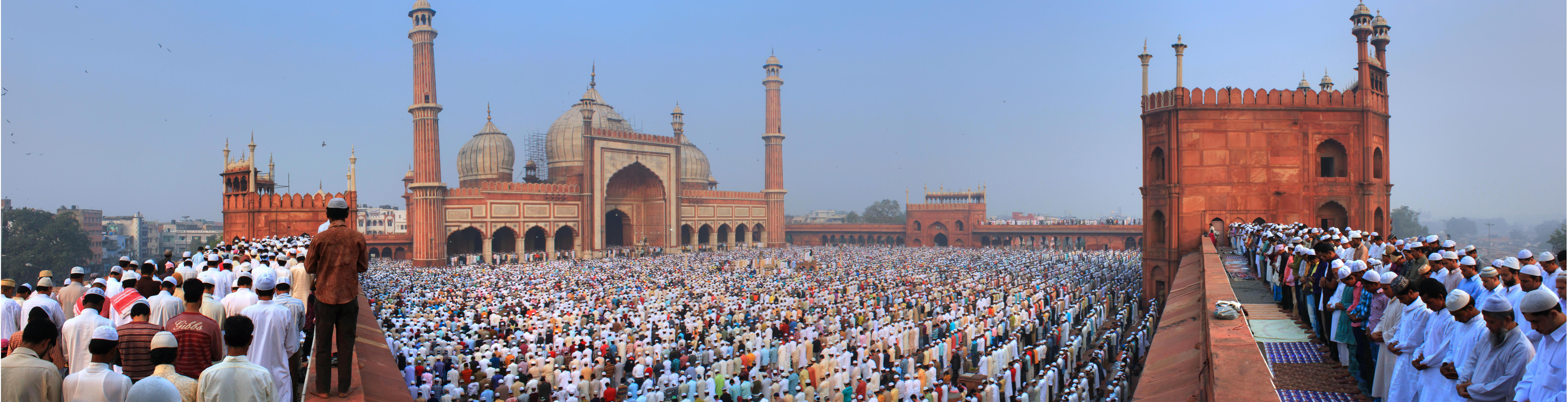
Eid panorama at the mosque

==== 2006 Jama Masjid explosions ====
On 14 April 2006, there were two explosions which came soon after Friday prayers and occurred in swift succession. It was unclear how the blasts occurred. Among the casualties, one was in serious condition, whereas eight other people sustained minor injuries. Imam Ahmed Bukhari commented, "there is anger among our people but I am appealing to them to maintain calm".

==== 2010 Jama Masjid attack ====
On 15 September 2010, two Taiwanese tourists were injured after gunmen on a motorcycle opened fire on a bus parked near gate number three of the mosque. After the attack, the police detained 30 people to question and the area was turned into a fortress after policemen were heavily deployed.

In November 2011, the Delhi Police arrested six members of the Indian Mujahideen who were believed to be behind the Jama Masjid blast along with the 2010 Pune bombing. Sources said that the "'main man' Imran" allegedly planted the bomb in a car outside the mosque. In September 2013 it was reported that Yasin Bhatkal, a leader of the group, along with Assadullah Akhtar, were arrested the month before and they admitted that they carried out the attack with the on-the-run Pakistani national Waqas. Yasin said that he was ordered by Karachi-based IM head Riyaz Bhatkal to do the task as the Imam allowed "semi-naked" foreigners inside it.

== Architecture ==
The Jama Masjid was built as a part of Shah Jahan's new capital in Delhi, Shahjahanabad. At the time of its construction, it was the largest mosque in the Indian subcontinent. Shah Jahan claimed the mosque was modelled after the Jama Masjid of Fatehpur Sikri, and this is reflected in the design of many exterior features, such as the façade and courtyard. However, the interior of the mosque more closely resembles the Jama Masjid in Agra. The mosque predominantly uses red sandstone, and is set apart from its predecessors by a more extensive usage of white marble. Black marble also features as a decorative element. Arabic and Persian calligraphic pieces are found on various surfaces of the structure, whose content ranges from religious to panegyric.

Having been built on a hill, the mosque is situated on a plinth elevated 10 metres (33 ft) above the surrounding city. The complex is oriented to the west, towards Mecca. An imperial college, imperial dispensary, and madrasa used to lie adjacent to the structure, but were destroyed in the uprisings of 1857.

=== Gates ===
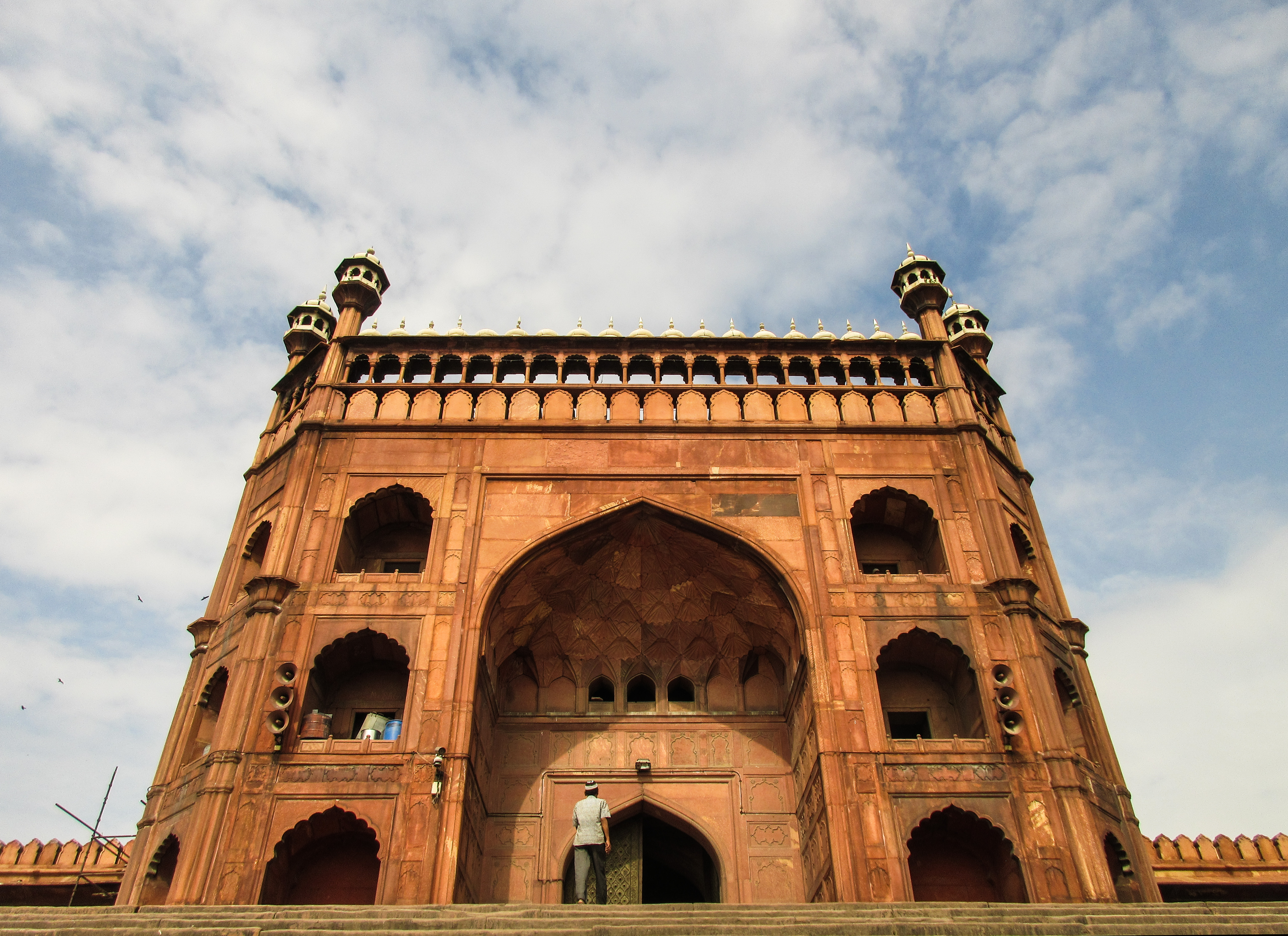
Eastern (main) gate

The mosque is accessed by three sandstone gates. The most prominent of these is the three-storey high eastern gate, which historically acted as the shahi (royal) entrance, reserved only for the use of the Emperor and his associates. The other two entrances are the northern and southern gates, which are two stories high and were used by the general population. Each gate is accompanied by a three-sided sandstone stairway, with white markings to designate prayer positions. The cabinet located in the north gate has a collection of relics of Muhammad – the Quran written on deerskin, a red beard-hair of the prophet, his sandals and his footprints embedded in a marble block.

=== Courtyard ===
The square sahn (courtyard) is paved with red sandstone, and faces the eastern gate. It has a side length of at least 99 metres (325 ft), and can accommodate 25,000 worshippers. In its centre lies a marble ablution tank, measuring 17 metres (56 ft) long and 15 metres (49 ft) wide. Open arcades run along the edges of the courtyard, through which the surroundings of the masjid are visible. Chhatris mark the four corners of the courtyard, rising above the arcades.

=== Prayer Hall ===
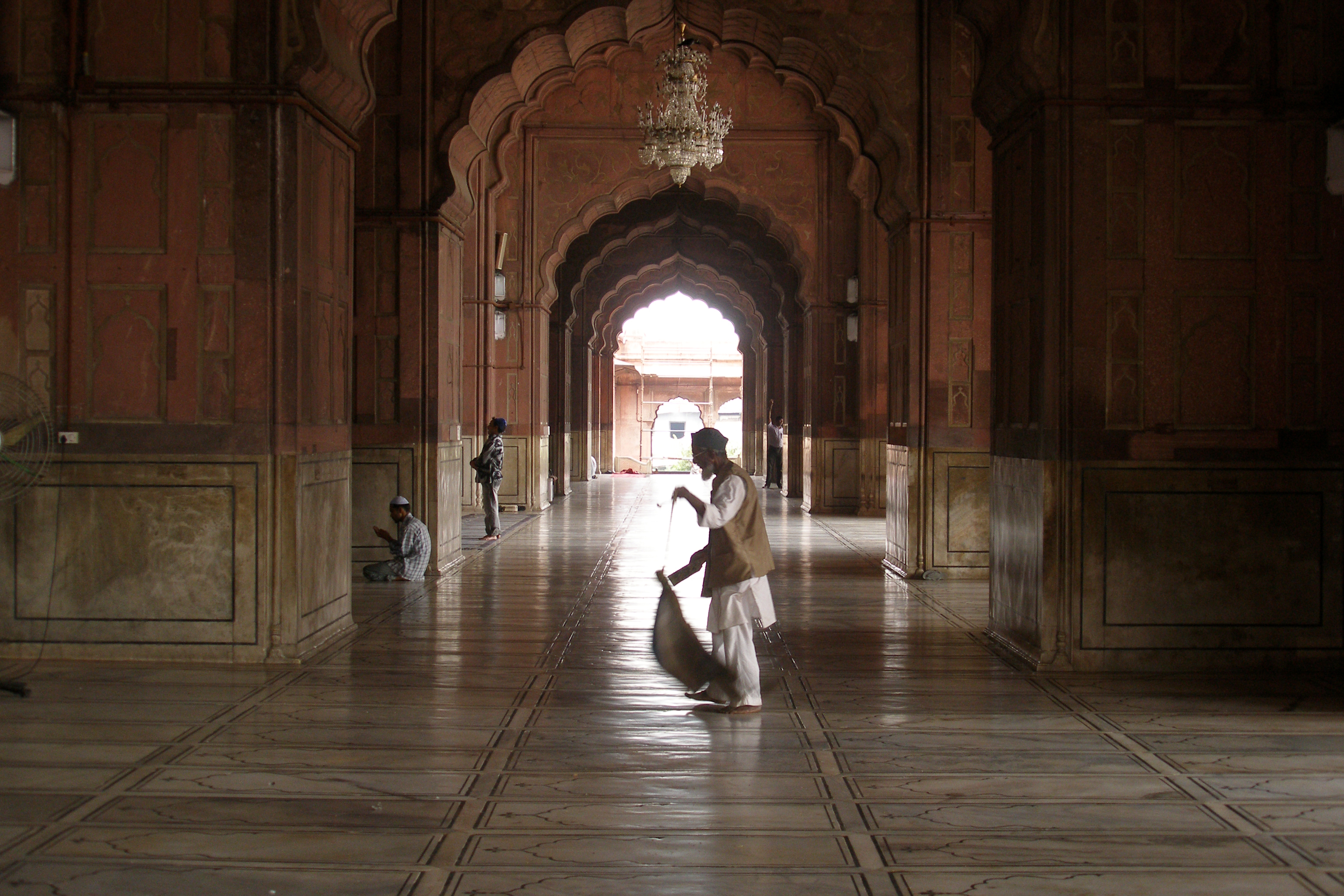
Interior section of the prayer hall

The prayer hall measures 61 metres (200 ft) long and 27 metres (89 ft) wide. Three marble domes rise up from its roof, featuring golden finials. The façade of the prayer hall features a grand pishtaq in the centre, flanked by five smaller, cusped archways on either side. Above each archway of the prayer hall are some calligraphic pieces. The interior of the hall bears seven mihrabs (prayer niches) on the western qibla wall, corresponding to the seven bays into which the hall is divided. The central mihrab is intricately decorated and clad in marble, with a marble minbar (pulpit) lying to its right. The hall is floored with white and black ornamented marble to look like a Muslim prayer mat.

=== Minarets ===
The mosque's domes are flanked by two sandstone minarets, at the northeast and southeast corners. They are 41 metres (135 ft) high and longitudinally striped with white marble. Each minaret consists of 130 steps, along which viewing galleries occur at three places. Both minarets are topped with a marble chhatri.

== Shahi Imam ==
Shah Jahān's wish was apparently to build the most important mosque in India, without any parallel anywhere in the Mughal Empire. He also decided that its Imam (the Muslim religious leader who leads the prayer) was to become the most important religious leader of his reign. The Imam of Jama Masjid thus received the title of Shahī Imam (religious leader installed by emperor). All subsequent Mughal emperors from Aurangzeb to Bahadur Shah II (1837-1857) were crowned by the Shahi Imam of the Jama Masjid in Delhi. The Imams of Delhi's Jama Masjid have traditionally been the direct descendants of the first Imam of the Masjid, Syed Abdul Ghafoor Shah Bukhari, who was appointed by Shah Jahan. Their position is known as that of the Shahi Imam, or Royal Imam. The person next-in-line to the position is known as the Naib Imam, or Deputy Imam. The Shahi Imams bear the last name of Bukhari, denoting their ancestral origin in Bukhara (of modern day Uzbekistan). The imams who have occupied the position are listed below.

Ordinal	Name	Title	Term start	Term end	Time in office
1	Abdul Ghafoor Shah Bukhari	Imam-us-Sultan	23 July 1656		
2	Abdul Shakoor Shah Bukhari				
3	Abdul Raheem Shah Bukhari				
4	Abdul Ghafoor Shah Bukhari Thani				
5	Abdul Rehman Shah Bukhari				
6	Abdul Kareem Shah Bukhari				
7	Mir Jeewan Shah Bukhari				
8	Mir Ahmed Ali Shah Bukhari				
9	Mohammed Shah Bukhari		16 October 1892		
10	Ahmed Bukhari	Shams-ul-Ulama			
11	Hameed Bukhari		20 February 1942	8 July 1973	31 years, 138 days
12	Abdullah Bukhari		8 July 1973	14 October 2000	27 years, 98 days
13	Ahmed Bukhari I		14 October 2000	25 February 2024	23 years, 134 days
14	Shaban Bukhari		25 February 2024	incumbent	2 years, 250 days

== Gallery ==
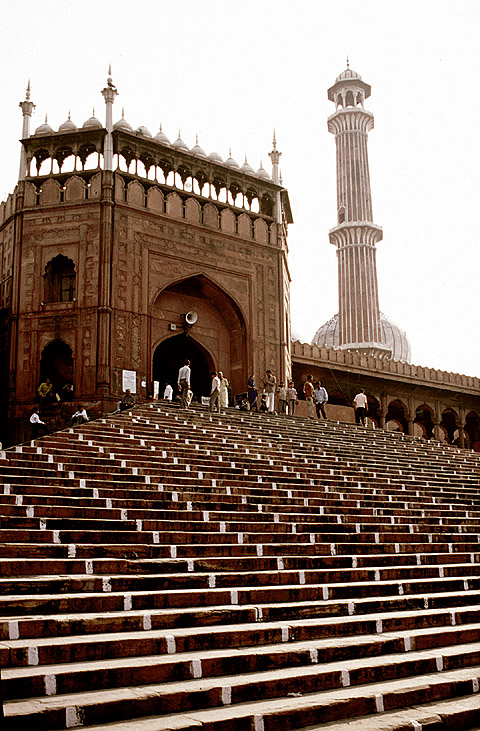
Northern gate

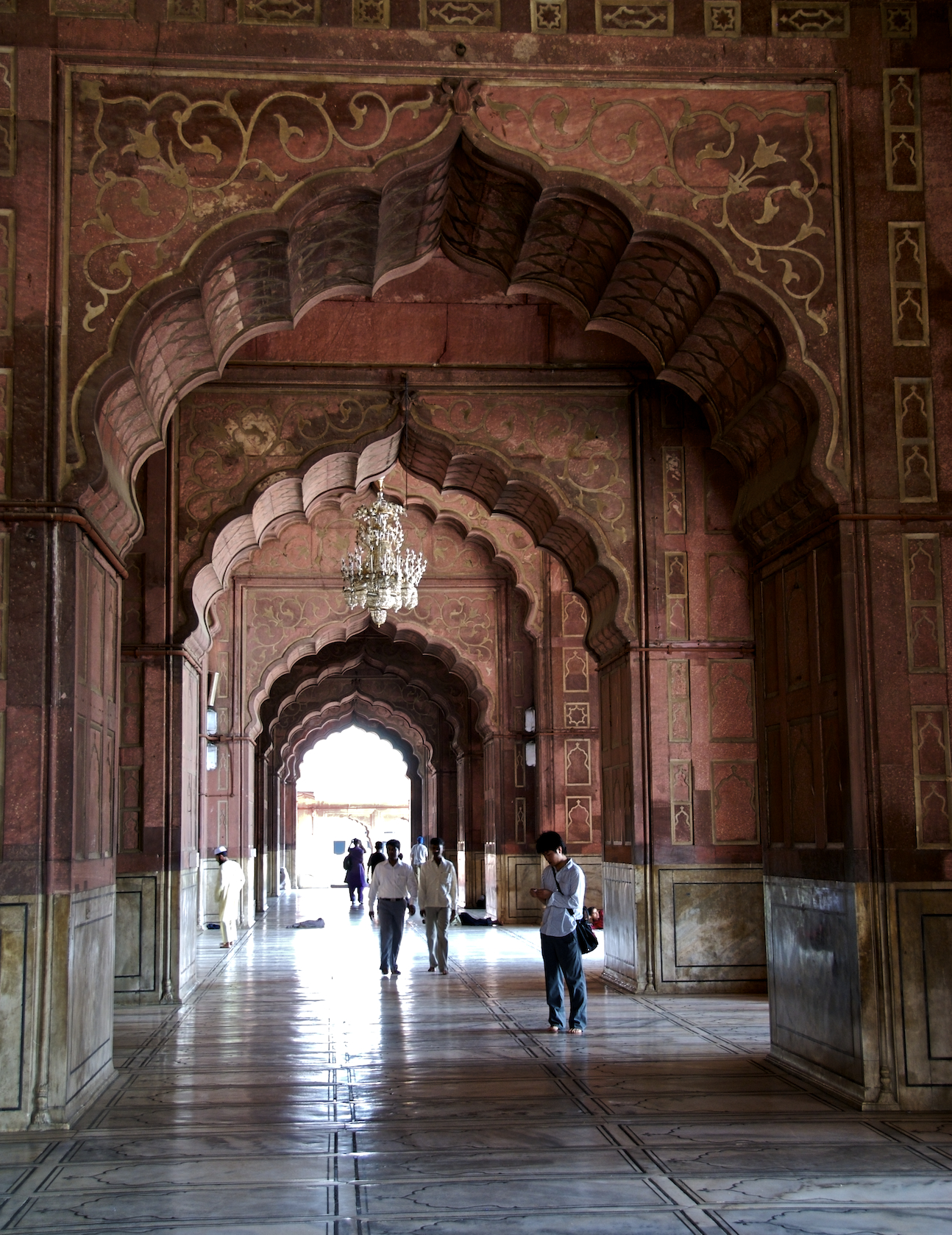
Inlay detail of interior arches

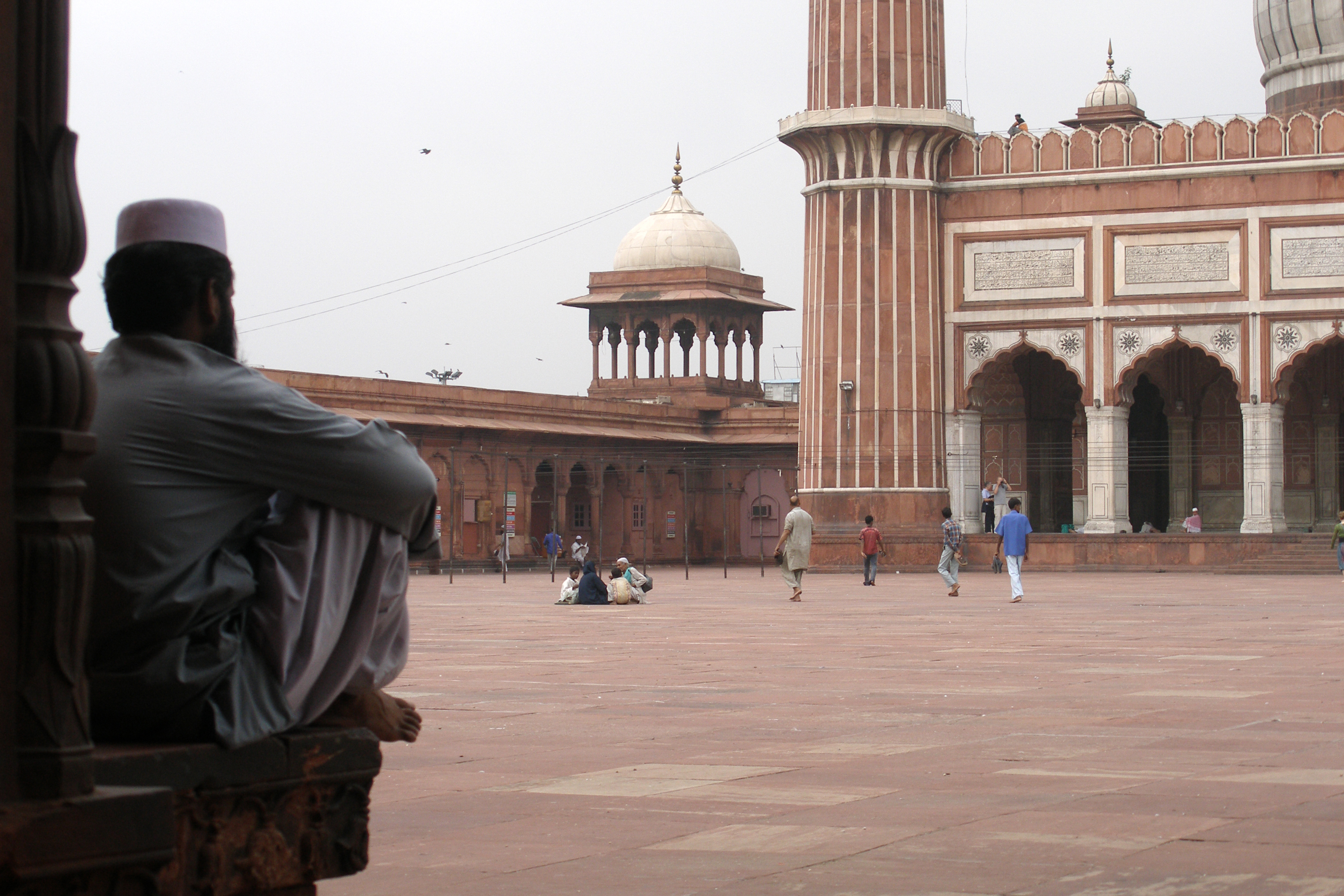
Facade

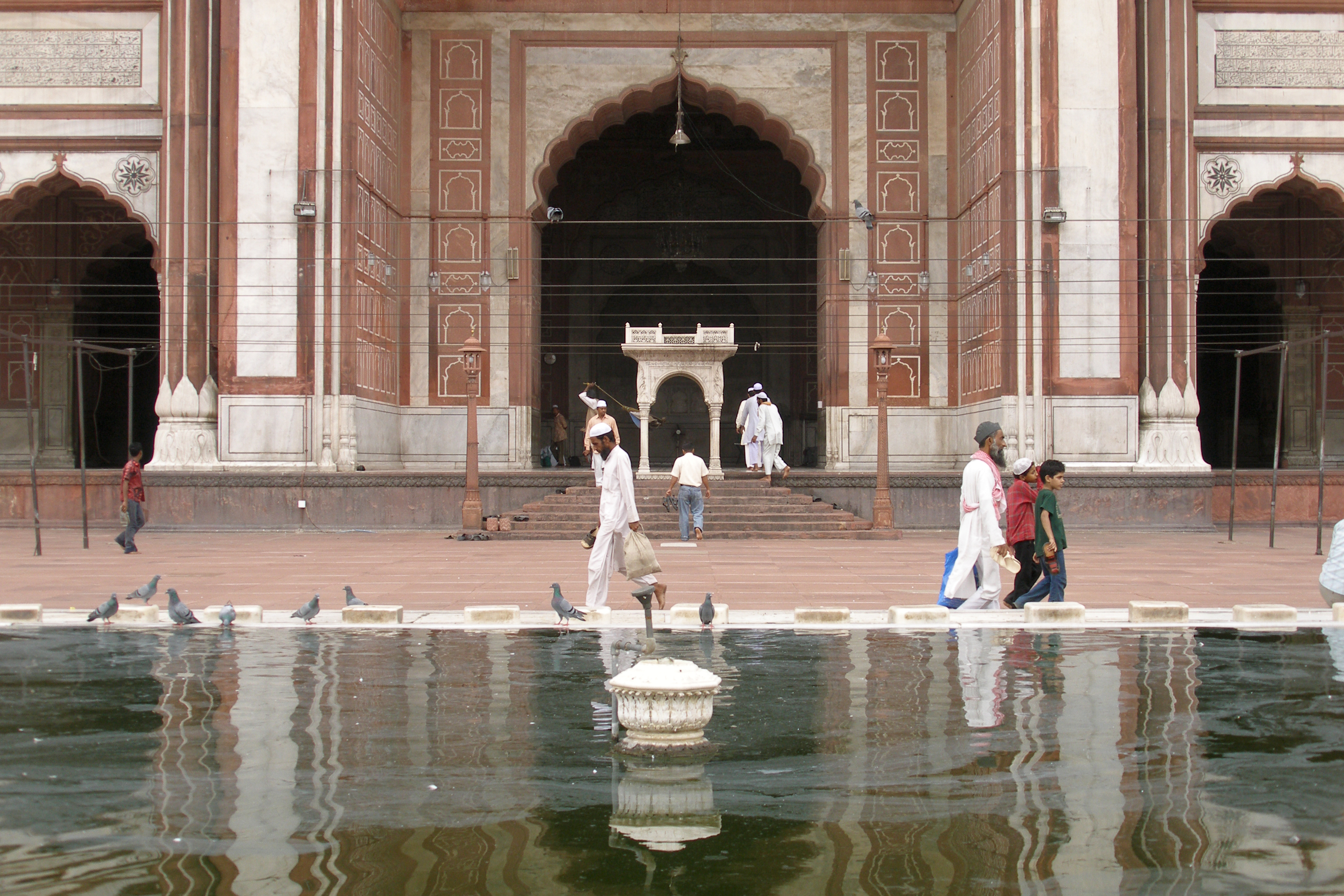
Pool

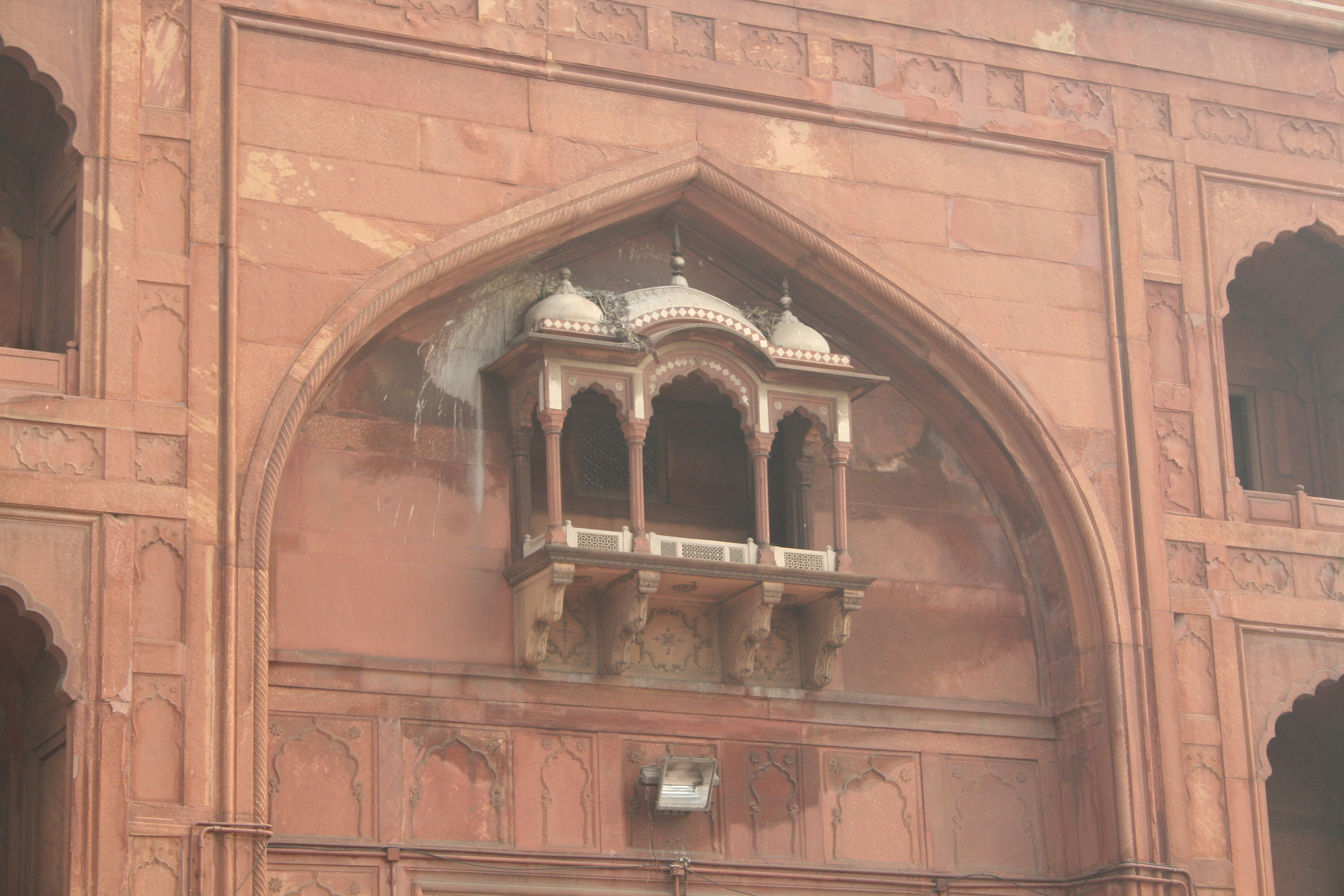
Detail of a balcony

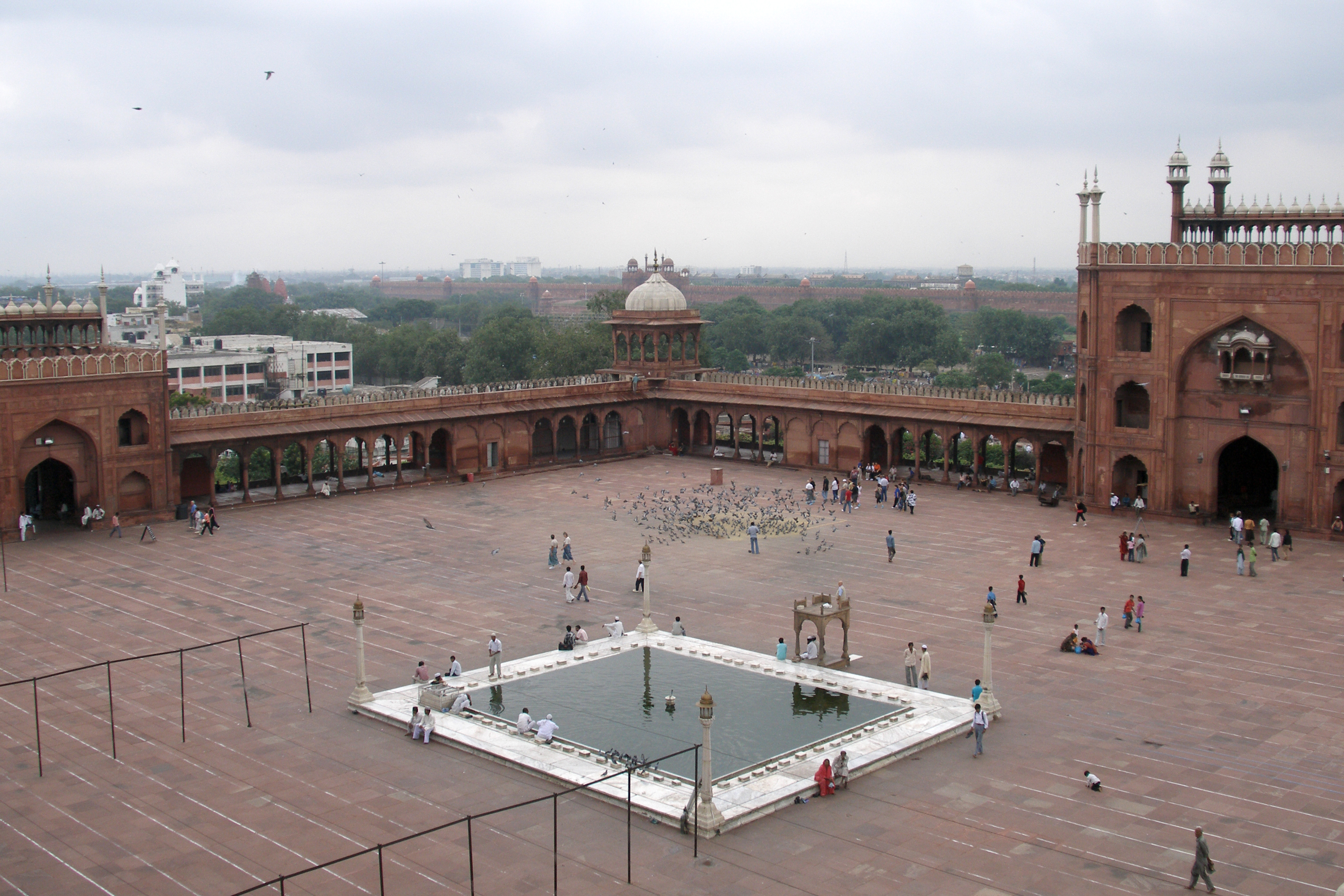
Courtyard

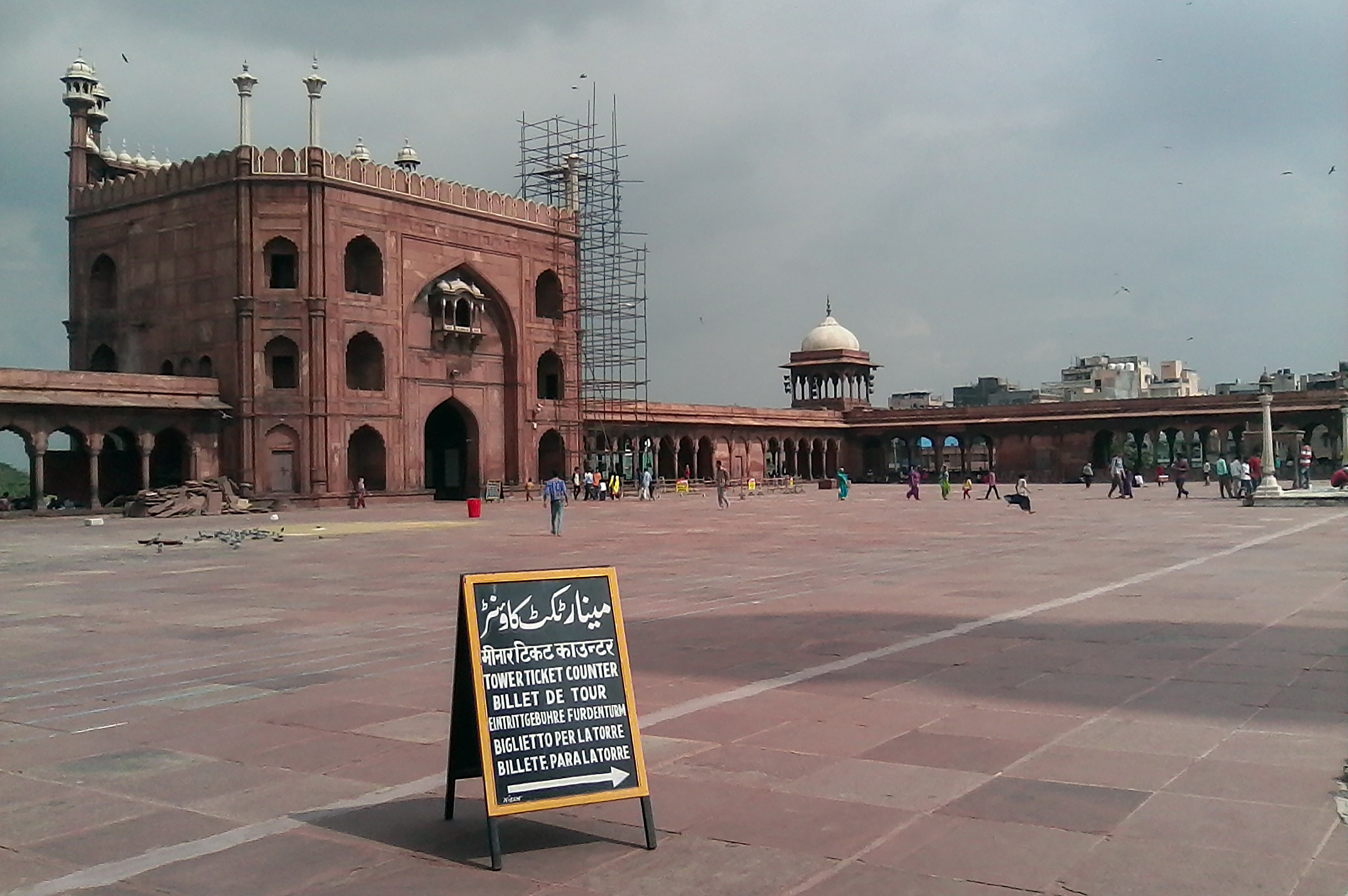
Courtyard

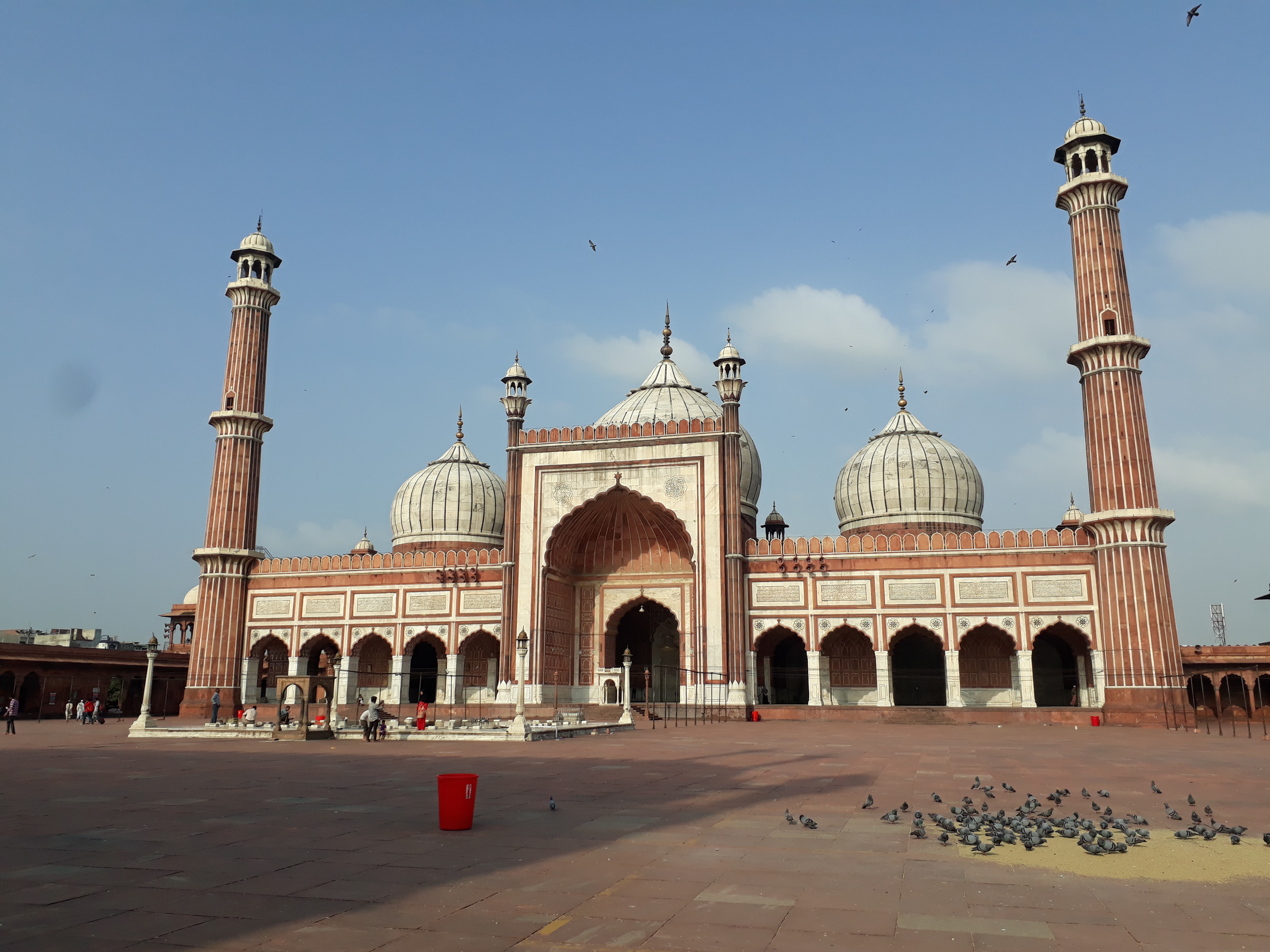
Courtyard

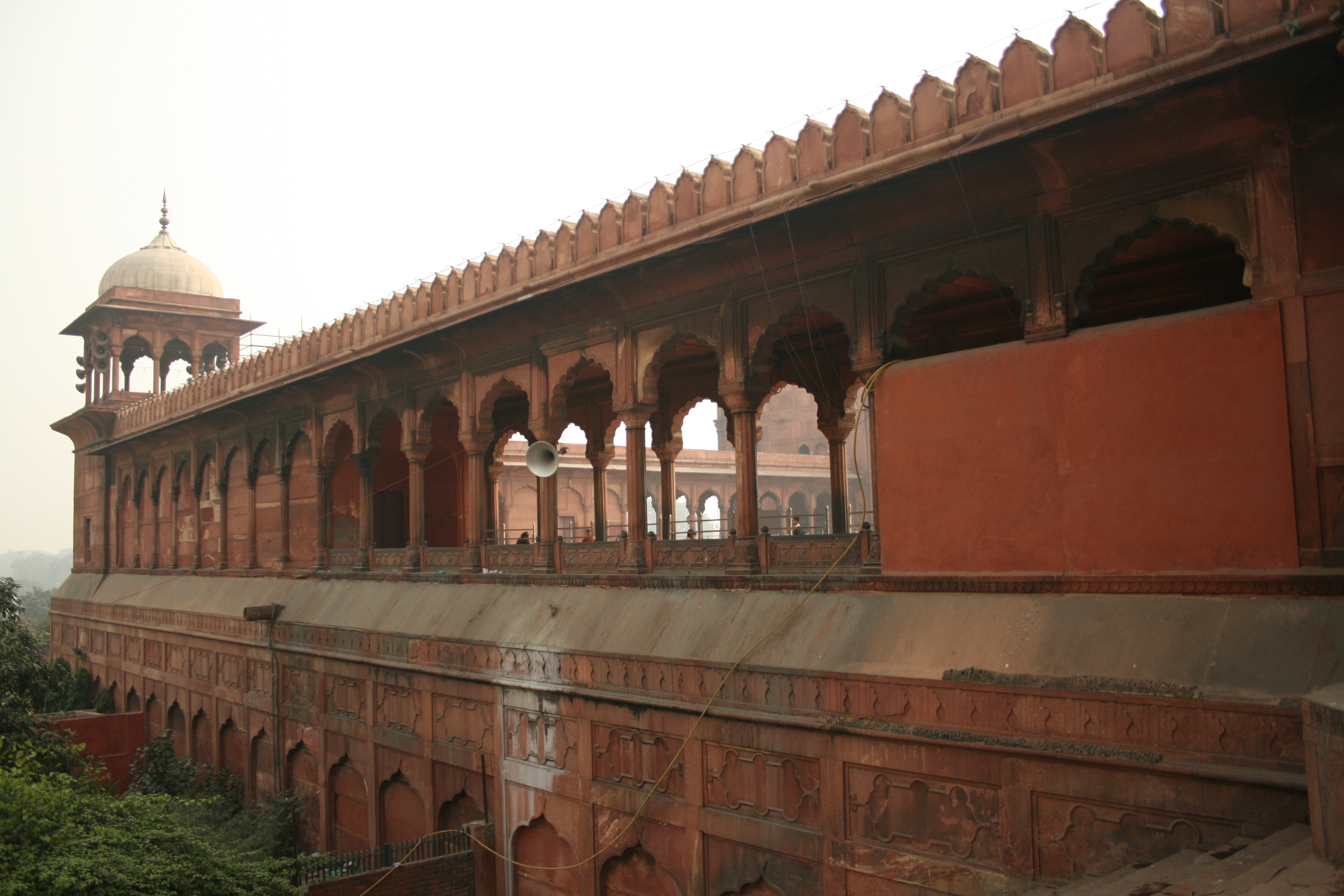
Exterior wall

== See also ==
- Islam in India
- List of mosques in India
- List of Monuments of National Importance in Delhi

== Bibliography ==
- Aziz, Sadia (April 2017). "Mosque, Memory and State: A Case Study of Jama Masjid (India) and the Colonial State c. 1857". The Polish Journal of Aesthetics. 47. Institute of Philosophy of the Jagiellonian University: 13–29. doi:10.19205/47.17.1. eISSN 2544-8242. Archived from the original (PDF) on 12 July 2020.
- Dalrymple, William (2004). City of Djinns: A year in Delhi. Penguin books. ISBN 978-0-14-303106-2.
- Liddle, Swapna (2011). Delhi: 14 Historic Walks. Tranquebar Press. ISBN 978-93-81626-24-5.
- Rajagopalan, Mrinalini (2016), Building Histories: The Archival and Affective Lives of Five Monuments in Modern Delhi, University of Chicago Press, ISBN 978-0-226-28347-0
- Stott, David; McCulloch, Victoria (14 January 2014). Rajasthan, Delhi & Agra: Footprint Focus Guide. Footprint Handbooks. ISBN 978-1-909268-39-5.
