= Shahi Imam =

Imam of the Jama Masjid mosque in Delhi

The Shahi Imam is the Imam of the Jama Masjid mosque in Delhi.

== History ==
Mughal Emperor Shahjahan appointed Abdul Ghafoor Shah Bukhari, who originally came from Shah of Bukhara, Uzbekistan to be the first Imam of the Mosque in 1656.

== Imams of Jama Masjid ==
Shahi Imams of Jama Masjid include:

1. Abdul Ghafoor Shah Bukhari (from 23 July 1656)
2. Abdul Shakoor Shah Bukhari
3. Abdul Raheem Shah Bukhari
4. Abdul Ghafoor Shah Bukhari Thani
5. Abdul Rehman Shah Bukhari
6. Abdul Kareem Shah Bukhari
7. Mir Jeewan Shah Bukhari
8. Mir Ahmed Ali Shah Bukhari (until 16 October 1892)
9. Mohammed Shah Bukhari (from 16 October 1892)
10. Ahmed Bukhari (until 20 February 1942)
11. Hameed Bukhari (20 February 1942 – 8 July 1973)
12. Abdullah Bukhari (8 July 1973 – 14 October 2000)
13. Ahmed Bukhari I (14 October 2000 – present)
14. Shaban Bukhari (25 February 2024 – present) Ahmed Bukhari will continue as Imam until health emergencies and then Shaban Bukhari will succeed him at Imamat.
