= Izz-un-Nissa =

Wife of Mughal emperor Shah Jahan

Izz-un-Nissa Begum
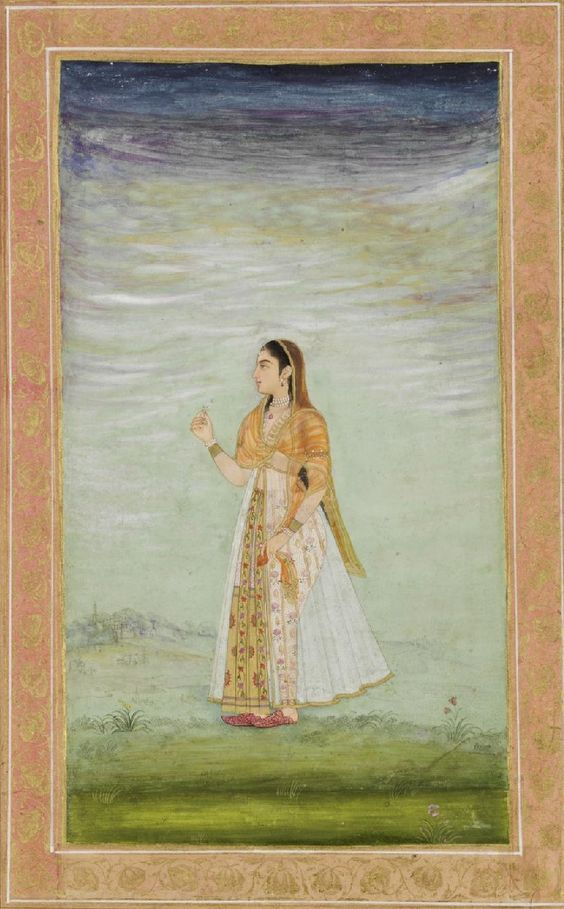
- Possible portrait of Izz-un-Nissa Begum, c. 17th century
- Born: Agra, Mughal Empire
- Died: 28 January 1678; Agra, Mughal Empire
- Burial: Tomb of Sirhindi Begum, Old Delhi
- Spouse: Shah Jahan (m. 1617; died 1666)
- Issue: Jahan Afroz Mirza
- House: Timurid (by marriage)
- Father: Shahnawaz Khan
- Religion: Islam

Izz-un-Nissa Begum, popularly known by her title Akbarabadi Mahal, was the third wife of the Mughal emperor Shah Jahan. Her title probably indicates that she hailed from the city of Akbarabad. She commissioned the Akbarabadi Mosque in Shahjahanabad (present-day Old Delhi). Less commonly, she is also referred to as Sirhindi Begum.

== Family ==
Izz-un-Nissa Begum was the daughter of Mirza Iraj who held the title, Shahnawaz Khan. He was the son of Abdul Rahim Khan-I-Khana, and the grandson of Bairam Khan. Bairam Khan was a descendant of Pir-ali Baharlu, a Black Sheep Turkoman. She had a brother Mirza Khan Manuchir.

== Marriage ==
In 1617, after the Deccan victory, Prince Khurram (future Shah Jahan) proposed to his father, Emperor Jahangir that Abdul Rahim Khan, Izz-un-Nissa's grandfather, should be given the governorship of all newly secured southern islands. He also made Izz-un-Nissa's father, Shahnawaz Khan de facto commander-in-chief of the southern islands. Both the appointments served to guarantee their future loyalty to Shah Jahan. He tied the knot more firmly in a traditional way, by taking Shahnawaz's young daughter Izz-un-Nissa Begum, as his third wife. He did not consult his father, Jahangir. However, according to Muhammad Amin Qazvini, a contemporary court biographer from the reign of Shah Jahan, the marriage was forced upon the prince. The wedding took place at Burhanpur on 2 September 1617, and was a full "bond of matrimony through a religious sanctioned marriage ceremony".

On 25 June 1619, at Agra, she gave birth to her only child, a son. Jahangir named him Sultan Jahan Afroz Mirza. But as the child was not born in an auspicious hour, he did not keep him with himself, and instead sent him to his great grandfather, Abdul Rahim Khan in Deccan, in the company of Abdul Rahim's daughter Janan Begum, the widow of the late Prince Daniyal Mirza, to be brought up under his care. Jahangir stated in his memoirs Tuzk-e-Jahangiri that in 1621 all the astrologers thought that Prince Shah Shuja, son of Shah Jahan, who had contracted smallpox, would die. However, according to the astrologer Jotik Rai, another of his sons whom Jahangir did not like would die. And so Izz-un-Nissa's son died prematurely at Burhanpur in March 1621.

According to a saying of the contemporary chronicler Inayat Khan, Shah Jahan had married her (and Kandahari Begum), "Yet his whole delight was centered in this illustrious lady (Mumtaz Mahal), to such an extent that he did not feel towards the others one thousandth part of the affection that he did for Her Late Majesty." According to Qazvini, "...these two wives enjoyed nothing more than the title of wifeship."

== Death ==
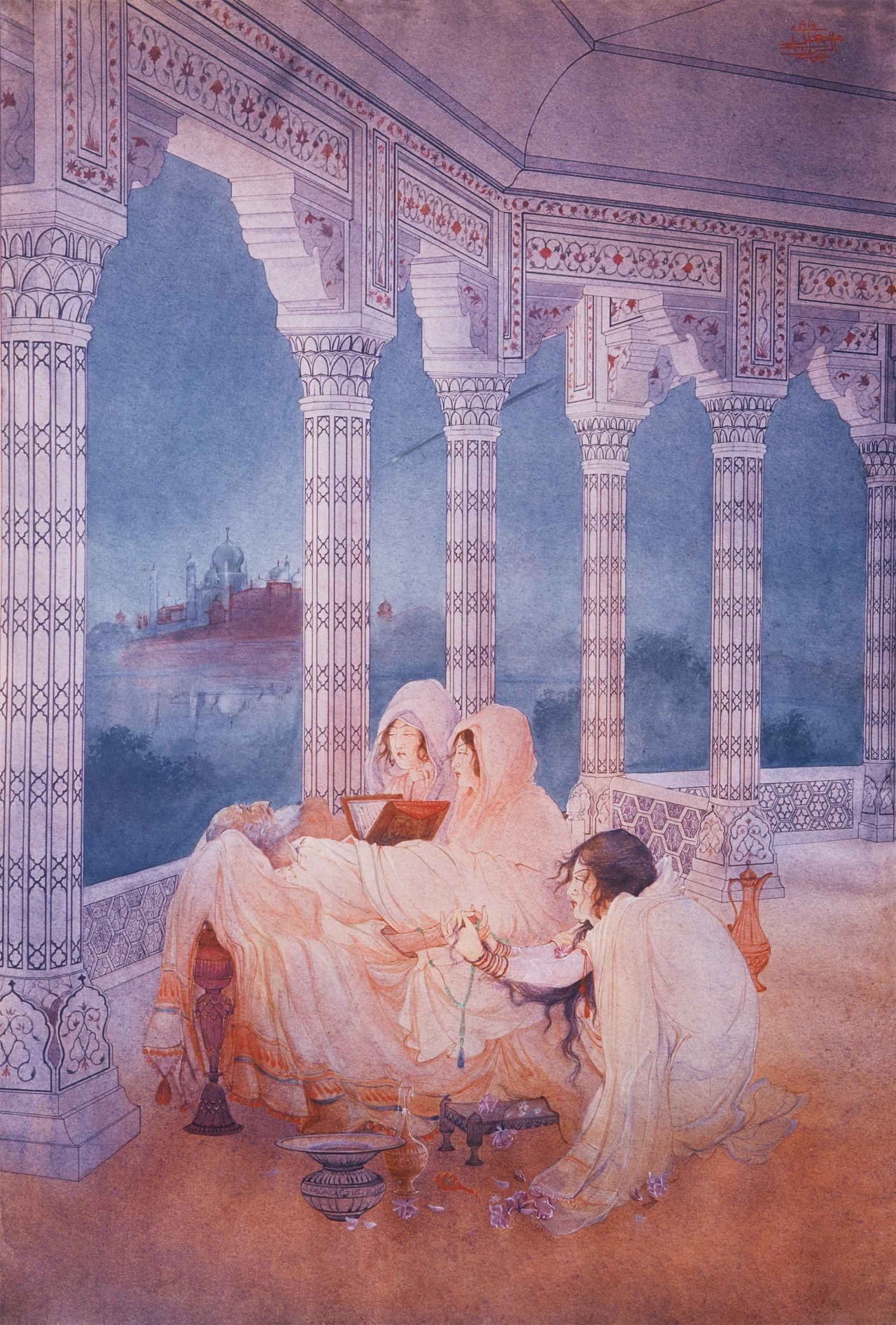
The consorts of Shah Jahan accompanying him during his imprisonment at Agra Fort, a painting by Abdur Rahman Chughtai.

She died 12 years later on 28 January 1678 in Agra.

== Bibliography ==
- Nicoll, Fergus (2009). Shah Jahan: The Rise and Fall of the Mughal Emperor. Penguin Books India. ISBN 978-0-670-08303-9.
- Khan, Inayat; Begley, Wayne Edison (1990). The Shah Jahan nama of 'Inayat Khan: an abridged history of the Mughal Emperor Shah Jahan, compiled by his royal librarian : the nineteenth-century manuscript translation of A.R. Fuller (British Library, add. 30,777). Oxford University Press. p. 71.
