= S. Abdul Khaliq Sweets =

Bakery in Pakistan

- Genre: Bakery
- Founded: 1835; 191 years ago
- Founder: Shaikh Abdul Khaliq
- Headquarters: Karachi, Pakistan
- Website: sakhaliq.com

S. Abdul Khaliq Sweets is an old bakery located near Boat Basin, Karachi, Pakistan.

== History ==
The roots of the bakery comes from Persia in the early 16th century. The Moghul Emperor Humayun, son of Babar, recaptured his throne by invading Northern India in 1555, after being in exile in Persia. Upon regaining his throne, he invited the makers of the Halwa he had grown so fond of to come to India. Hence, the ancestors of S. Abdul Khaliq became the official Halwa makers for the Moghul and remained so until 1835. In 1835, Abdul Ghafoor received permission to share his wares with the public and opened a shop in Ghanta Ghar, Chandni Chowk, India.

At time of independence, the two famous Mithai makers, Abdul Khaliq and Abdul Hanaan, migrated to Karachi from New Delhi. The flagship store was opened in Saddar, Karachi in 1947, they currently have only one branch in Clifton, Karachi.
