= Lawrence Institute =

Lawrence Institute may refer to:

- Lawrence Technological University, Michigan
- Lawrence University, Wisconsin
- Lawrence Livermore National Laboratory, Livermore, California
- Lawrence Hall of Science, Berkeley, California
- Lawrence Institute, the original name of the Delhi Town Hall, India

== See also ==
- St. Lawrence Institute, a former building of the College of North West London
- Andrea Lawrence Institute for Mountains and Rivers, founded by Andrea Mead Lawrence
