= Satyabati =

Satyabati may refer to:

- Satyavati Devi (1904–1945), participant in Indian independence movement. She was acclaimed as the Joan of Arc of India
- Satyavati Devi (born 1905), participant in Indian independence movement. Died as the oldest living participant of the Indian Independence Movement.
- Satyavati, the queen of the Kuru king Shantanu of Hastinapur, a character in the Hindu epic Mahabharata
- Satyavati (character), a fictional character in the Byomkesh detective series by Sharadindu Bandyopadhyay
