= Shraddhanand =

Indian independence activist

Swami Shraddhanand
- Born: 22 February 1856; Talwan, Jalandhar, Punjab, India
- Died: 23 December 1926 (aged 70); Delhi, India
- Cause of death: Assassination
- Known for: Social worker Freedom Fighter; Independence Activist; Teacher; Religious Leader

Shraddhanand (22 February 1856 – 23 December 1926), born Munshi Ram, was an Indian independence activist and Arya Samaj sannyasi who propagated the teachings of Dayananda Saraswati. This included the establishment of educational institutions, like the Gurukul Kangri University, and played a key role on the Sangathan (consolidation and organization) and the Shuddhi (purification), a Hindu reform movement in the 1920s.

== Early life and education ==
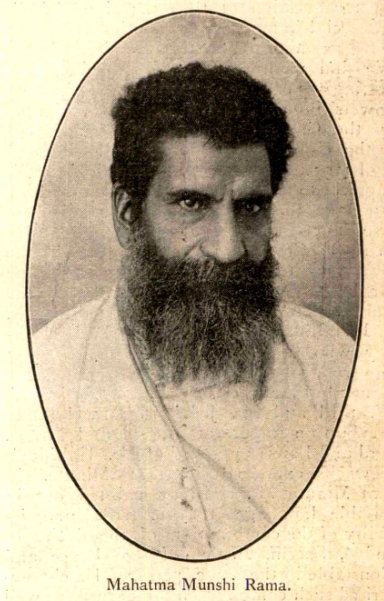
A portrait of Shraddhanand

He was born on 22 February 1856 in the village of Talwan in the Jalandhar District of the Punjab Province of India. He was the youngest child in the family of Lala Nanak Chand, who was a Police Inspector in the United Provinces (now Uttar Pradesh), then administered by the East India Company. His given name was Brihaspati Vij, but later he was called Munshi Ram Vij by his father, a name that stayed with him till he took sanyas in 1917, variously as Lala Munshi Ram Vij and Mahatma Munshi Ram.

He adopted atheism after a few incidents, such as when he was prevented from entering the temple while a noble woman was praying. He also was witness to a "compromising" situation involving a church's father with a nun, the attempted rape of a young devotee by pontiffs of the Krishna cult, and the suspicious death of a little girl at the home of a Muslim lawyer. All of these events cemented his atheism. He eventually passed mukhtari exams and began studying law from Punjab University Law College to become a lawyer.

=== Meeting Dayanand ===
He first met Dayanand Saraswati when Dayanand visited Bareilly to give lectures. His father was handling arrangements and security at the events, due to the attendance of some prominent personalities and British officers. Munshiram attend the lectures at his father's request. He originally went with the intent of spoiling the arrangements, then claimed to be strongly influenced by Dayanand's courage, skill, and strong personality. After completing his studies Munshiram started his practice as lawyer.

== Career ==
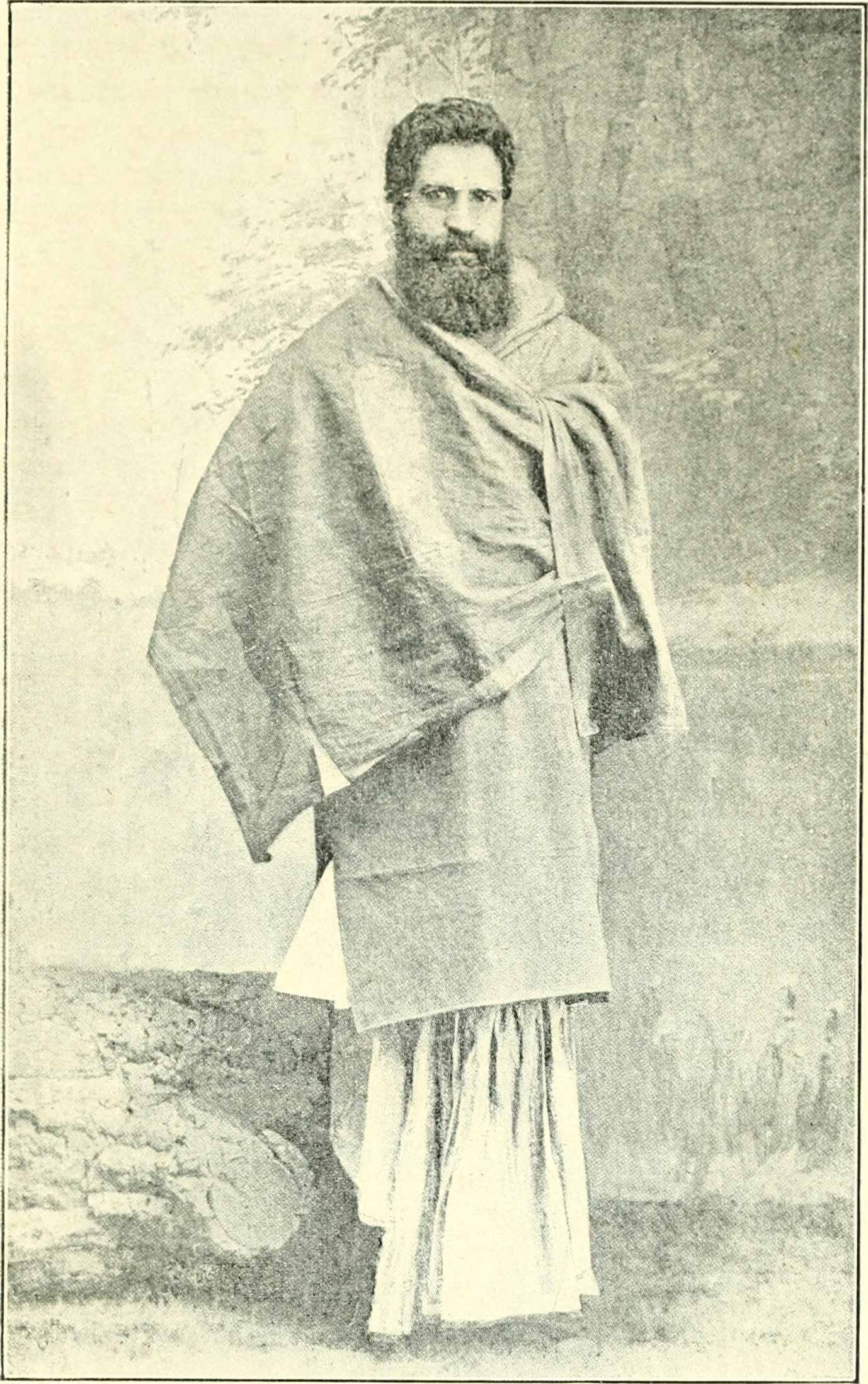
Shraddhanand in his early days.

=== Schools ===
In 1892 Arya Samaj was split into two factions after a controversy over whether to make Vedic education the core curriculum at the DAV College Lahore. He left the organization and formed the Punjab Arya Samaj. The Arya Samaj was divided between the Gurukul Section and the DAV Section. Shraddhanand headed for Gurukuls. In 1897, when Pandit Lekh Ram was assassinated, Shraddhanand succeeded him. He headed the 'Punjab Arya Pratinidhi Sabha', and started its monthly journal, Arya Musafir. In 1902 he established a Gurukul in Kangri, India near Haridwar. This school is now recognized as Gurukul Kangri University.

In 1917, Mahatma Munshi Ram took sanyas as "Swami Shradhanand Saraswati".

Shraddhanand established Gurukul Indraprashtha in Aravali near Faridabad, Haryana.

=== Activism ===
In 1917, Shraddhanand left Gurukul to become an active member of the Hindu reform movements and the Indian Independence movement. He began working with the Congress, which he invited to hold its session at Amritsar in 1919. This was because of the Jalianwala massacre, and no one in the Congress Committee disagreed to have a session at Amritsar. Motilal Nehru presided over the session.

He also joined the nationwide protest against the Rowlatt Act. The same year he protested in front of a posse of Gurkha soldiers at the Clock Tower in Chandni Chowk, then was allowed to proceed. In the early 1920s he emerged as an important force in the Hindu Sangathan (consolidation) movement, which was a by product of the now revitalised Hindu Mahasabha.

Swami Shradhanand was the only Hindu Sanyasi who addressed a huge gathering from the minarets of the main Jama Masjid New Delhi, for national solidarity and Vedic dharma starting his speech with the recitation of Vedic mantras.

He wrote on religious issues in both Hindi and Urdu. He published newspapers in the two languages as well. He promoted Hindi in the Devanagri script, helped the poor and promoted the education of women. By 1923, he left the social arena and plunged whole-heartedly into his earlier work of the shuddhi movement (re-conversion to Hinduism), which he turned into an important force within Hinduism. In 1922, Dr. Ambedkar called Shraddhanand “the greatest and most sincere champion of the Untouchables”.

In late 1923, he became the president of Bhartiya Hindu Shuddhi Sabha, created with an aim of reconverting Muslims, specifically 'Malkana Rajputs' in the western United Province. This brought him into direct confrontation with Muslim clerics and leaders of the time. 1,63,000 Malkana Rajputs were converted back to Hindu fold due to this movement.

=== Vegetarianism ===
Shraddhanand was a strict vegetarian and influential in the cow protection movement. He argued that meat eating was immoral. In the early 1890s, he was one of leaders of the vegetarian branch of Arya Samaj which became known as the Mahatma Party. In March and August 1893, he attempted without success to restrict Lahore Arya Samaj membership to vegetarians. However, in September 1893 non-vegetarian members lost their majority vote and withdrew from Lahore Arya Samaj, forming a rival group. Shraddhanand was honorary secretary of the Lahore Vegetarian Society and a speaker at the second anniversary of the Punjab Vegetarian Society in November 1892.

== Assassination ==
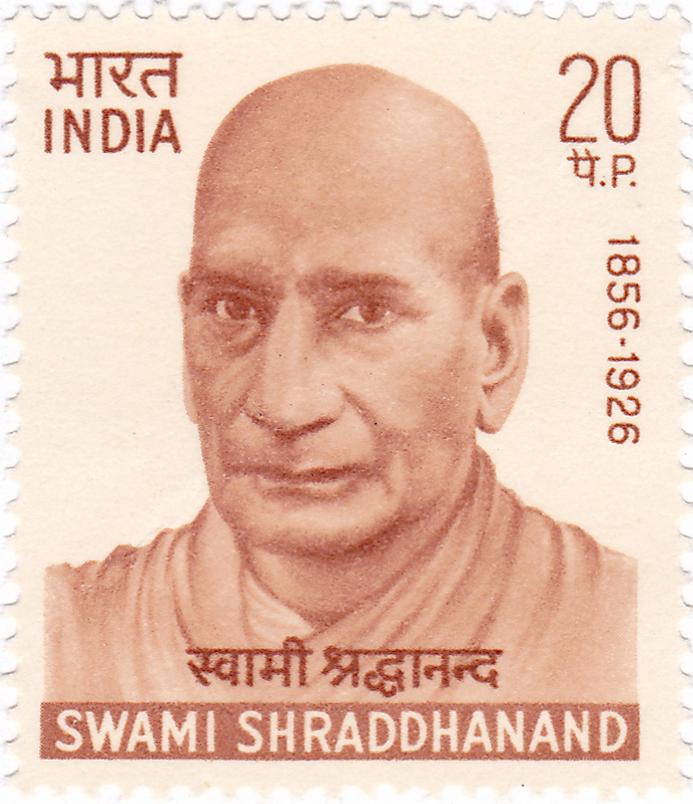
A 1970 Indian stamp dedicated to Shraddhanand.

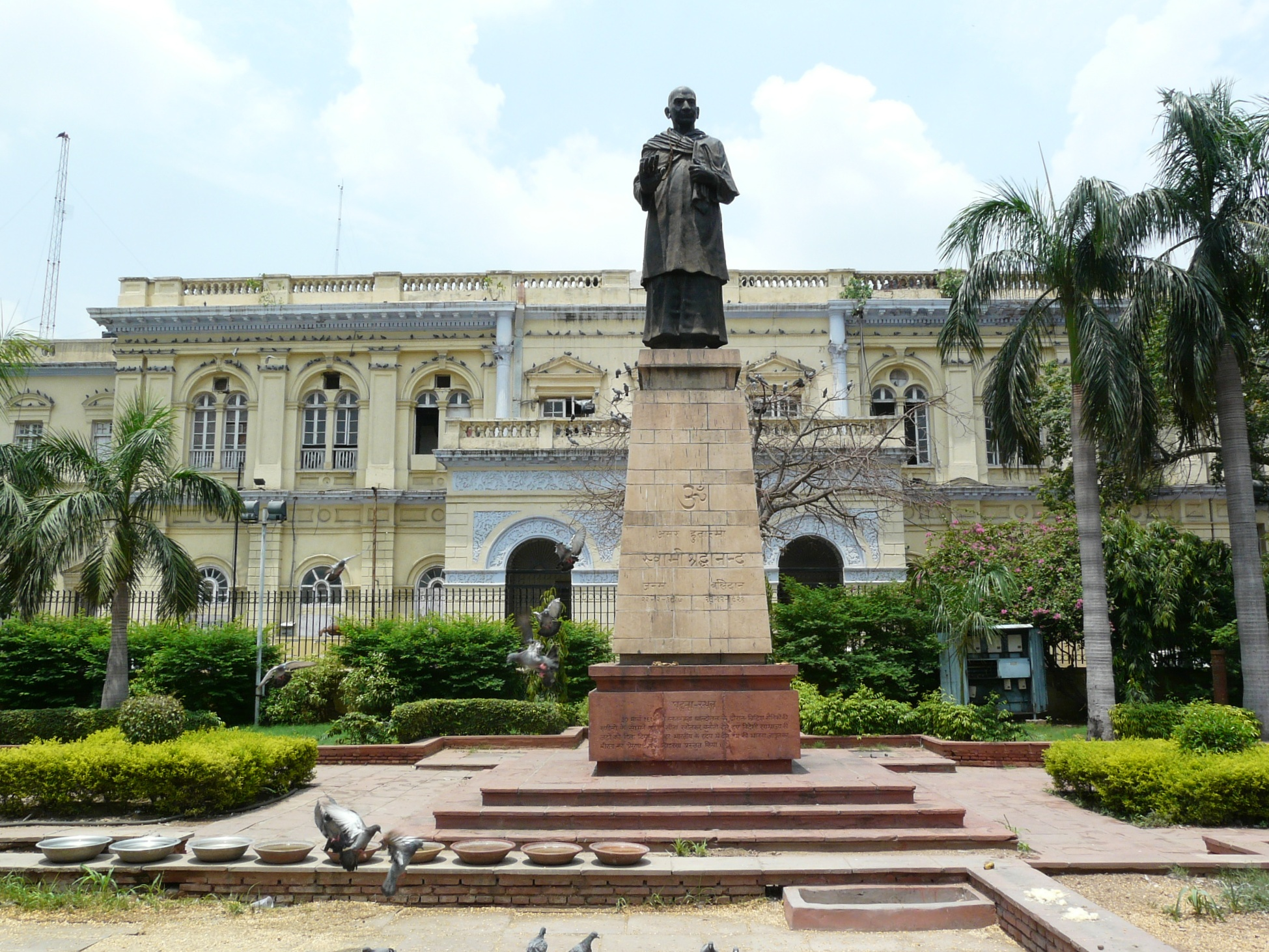
Statue of Shraddhanand in front of Delhi Town Hall.

On 23 December 1926, Shraddhanand was assassinated by an Islamic radical Abdul Rashid who said he murdered Shraddhanand over his comments on Islam. Rashid was executed by hanging in 1927. Gandhi called the murderer Rashid "my brother" just after the murder and objected to the hanging of murderer Rashid.

The 'Swami Shraddhanand Kaksha' at the archeological museum of the Gurukul Kangri University in Haridwar houses a photographic journey of his life.

A statue of him was placed in front of Delhi Town Hall after independence, replacing a statue of Victoria. This location in Old Delhi is termed ghantaghar because the old clock tower stood here until the 1950s.

== Personal life ==
Shraddhanand and his wife Shiva Devi had two sons and two daughters. His wife died when Shraddhanand was 36 years old. His granddaughter Satyavati was a prominent opponent of the British rule in India.

== See also ==
- Arya Samaj
- Hindu reformists

== Bibliography ==
- The Arya Samaj and Its Detractors: A Vindication, Rama Deva. Published by s.n, 1910.
- Hindu Sangathan: Saviour of the Dying Race, Published by s.n., 1924.
- Inside Congress, by Swami Shraddhanand, Compiled by Purushottama Rāmacandra Lele. Published by Phoenix Publications, 1946.
- Kalyan Marg Ke Pathik (Autobiography:Hindi), New Delhi. n.d.
- Autobiography (English Translation), Edited by M. R. Jambunathan. Published by Bharatiya Vidya Bhavan, 1961
