= Ghantaghar =

Place in Delhi India

Coordinates: 28.6564°N 77.2275°E

Ghantaghar (literally clock-tower) is a location in the center of Chandni Chowk, Old Delhi, where an iconic clock tower, termed Northbrook Clocktower during early 20th century, stood. The clock tower was built in 1870 and stood there until its partial collapse and subsequent demolition in 1950s. The term "Chandni Chowk" (translation: silvery or moonlit square) originally referred to this location which later came to designate the entire street. The Ghantaghar location has been regarded as the center of Delhi, and even now serves as a center for major civic events. Today, it is an open and congested area. The Delhi Town Hall is located just to the north of this site.

It was perhaps the oldest clock tower in India, constructed before Rajabai Clock Tower, Mumbai, 1878, Husainabad Clock Tower, Lucknow, 1881, Secunderabad Clock Tower, Secunderabad, 1897 and Allahabad Clock Tower, Allahabad, 1913. While the clock tower is long gone, the location is still called Ghantaghar within Old Delhi.

Ghantaghar was the location of some of the events relating to the Indian's freedom movement. On 30 March 1919, many protesters were killed by the British soldiers. It is still a very popular spot for organizing protests.

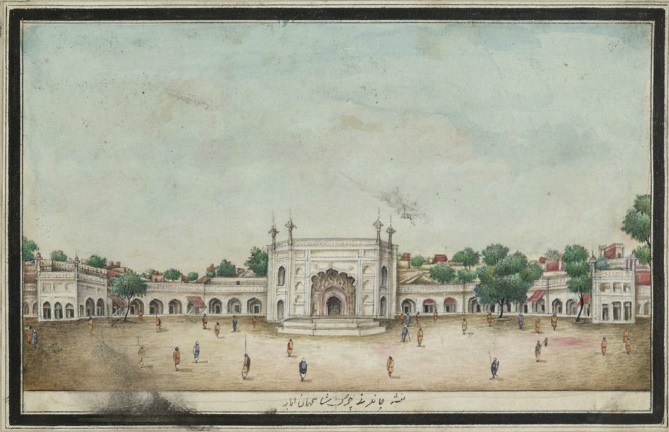
Jahanara Begum's caravanserai that formed the original Chandni Chowk, from Sir Thomas Theophilus Metcalf's 1843 album

== The Caravanserai and Town Hall ==
The old city of Delhi was laid out by princess Jahanara Begum, who constructed an elegant caravanserai on the East side of the street with gardens in the back. Herbert Charles Fanshawe, in 1902, mentions about the serai:

"Proceeding up the Chandni Chowk and passing many shops of the principal dealers in jewels, embroideries, and other products of Delhi handicrafts, the Northbrook Clock Tower and the principal entrance to the Queen's Gardens are reached. The former is situated at the site of the Karavan Sarai of the Princess Jahanara Begum (p. 239), known by the title of Shah Begum. The Sarai, the square in front of which projected across the street, was considered by Bernier one of the finest buildings in Delhi and was compared by him with the Palais Royal, because of its arcades below and rooms with a gallery in front above. Bernier was of opinion that the population of Delhi in 1665 was much the same as that of Paris, a striking instance of how the population follows the court in the East. The gardens must at one time have been extremely beautiful specimens of eastern pleasure retreats, and even now are very pretty."

The serai was demolished perhaps even before the ghadar of 1857. The serai was replaced by the Victorian-Edwardian architecture building now known as the Town Hall, and the pool in the middle of the square was replaced by a grand clock tower. The Town Hall was actually planned before the Revolt, and was built in 1860-5, as a center for the Europeans and was initially called the Lawrence Institute. The Institute contained a Darbar Hall with a public library and reading rooms. According to MCD, the Town Hall had been planned to serve as an office for the municipality, chamber of commerce, a literary society and a museum to ‘improve the local minds and to forward intercourse between Europeans and natives.’

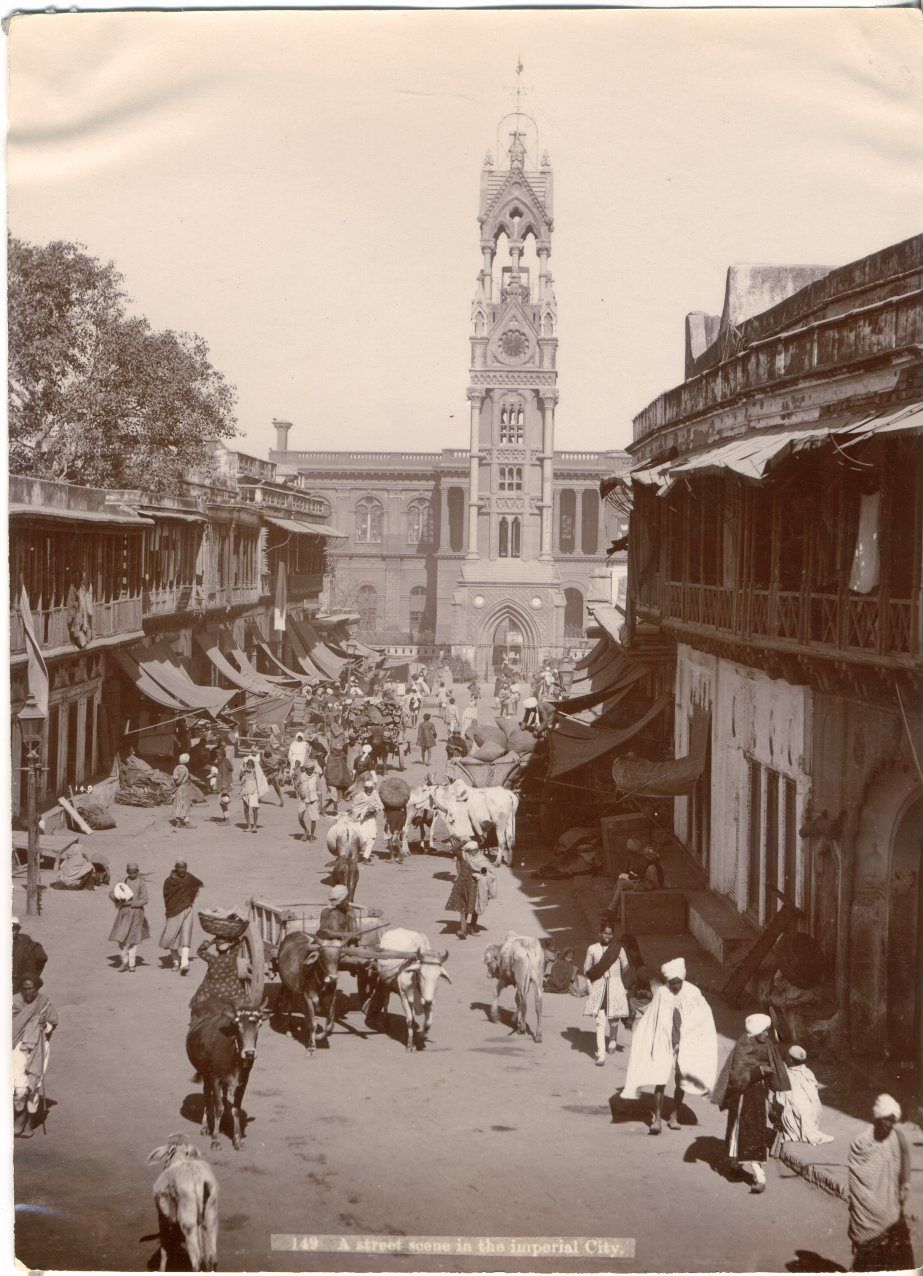
"A street scene in the Imperial City," photo by Jadu Kissen, acquired by a visitor in 1910, as viewed from Nai Sarak

== The Northbrook Clock tower ==
In front of Lawrence Institute, in the center of the Chandni Chauk, a 128 feet tall lofty Gothic clock-tower with four faces were constructed.

Built by Delhi Municipality at a cost of Rs. 28,000, it was formally termed the Northbrook Clocktower. after Thomas Northbrook, the Viceroy of India from 1872 to 1876. Northbrook hotel, a famous hotel near the Moree gate was also named after him. The tower is said to have been 80 years old when it collapsed, implying its construction occurred in 1870.

It was actually standing in 1870 already according to Alfred Harcourt who wrote in 1870:

Facing the Delhi Institute on the Chandni Chowk side, is a handsome and well-finished Clock Tower with four faces, and a chime of five bells. The City is indebted for this useful as well as ornamental structure also to the Municipal Committee at a cost of Rupees 25,500. It is 128 feet above the ground.

It is said that the pigeons sat on their hands so that it never showed the correct time. When Lord Northbrook visited Delhi, he did not quite like the architecture.

== Statue of Queen Victoria ==
Inside the railings of the street a Statue of Queen Victoria, the late Queen Empress of India was placed by Mr. James Skinner, a grandson of Colonel Skinner, C.B. in front of the Municipal building.

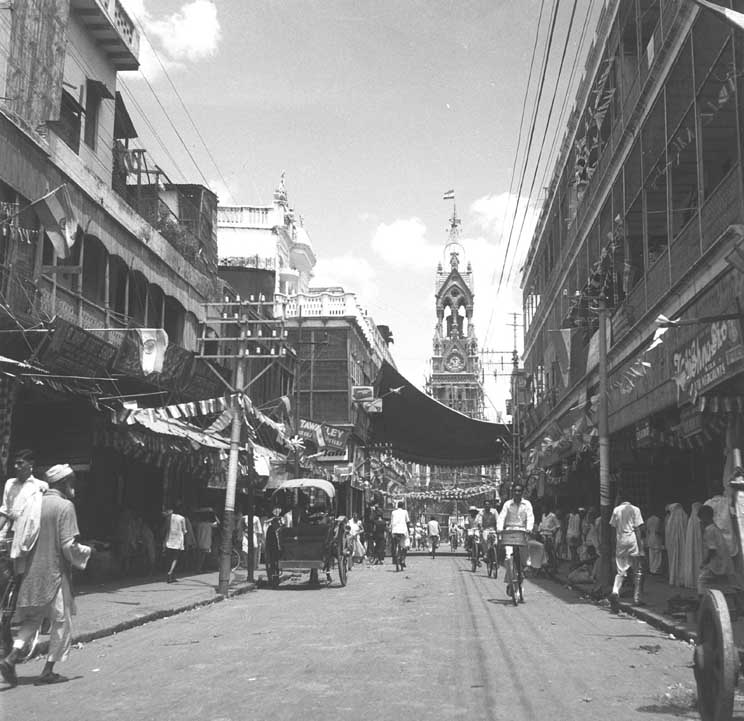
Indian National Flag hoisted at Chandni Chowk, 15 August 1947

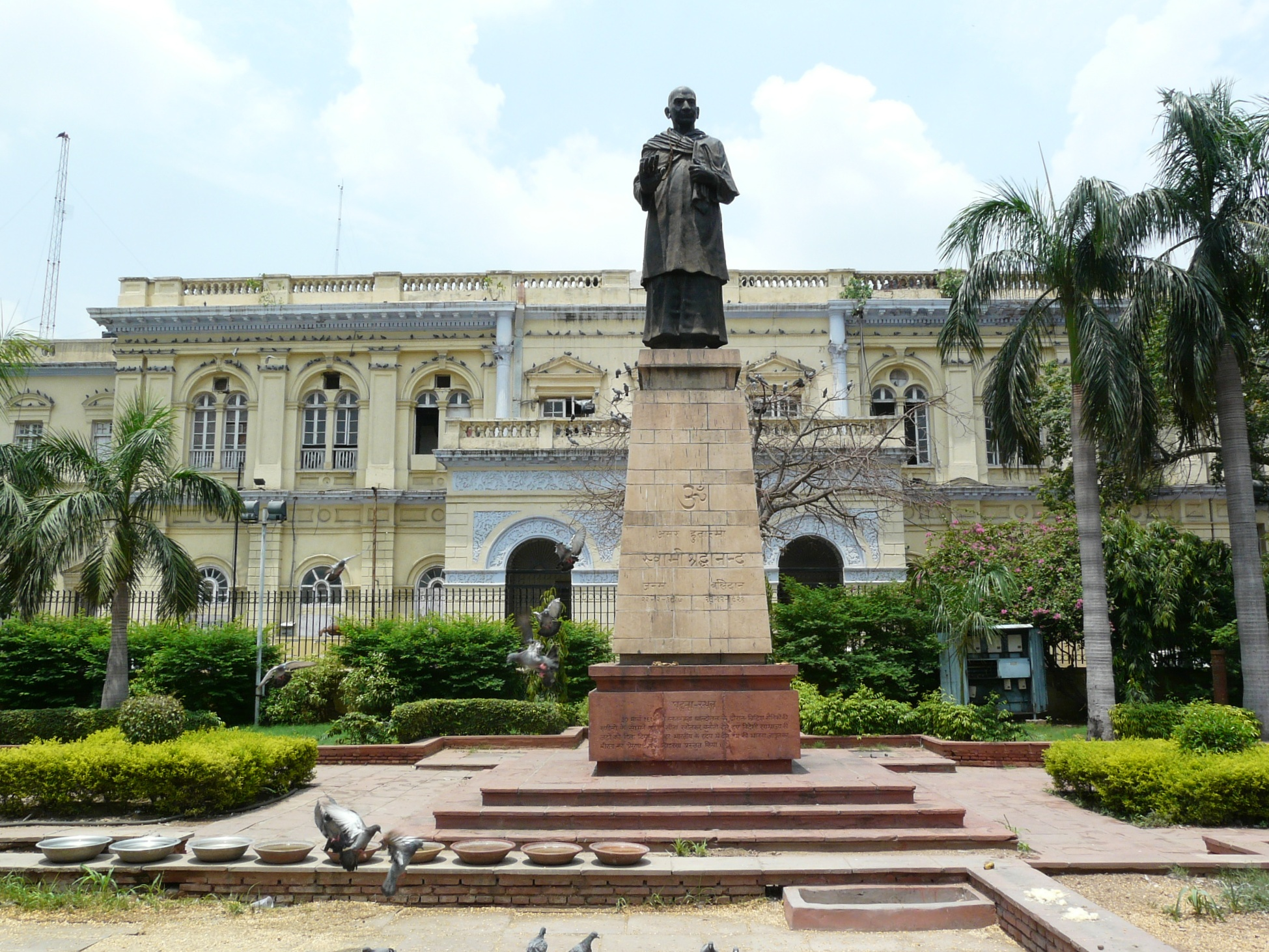
Delhi Town Hall at Chandni Chowk, with the statue of Swami Shraddhanand in front

The bronze statue of Queen Victoria stood between the tower and the municipal building in 1902. also image on cover The statue of Queen Victoria was later moved to Delhi College of Art

== Partial collapse and dismantling ==
When India became independent on 15 August 1947, GhantaGhar, was lit up for the occasion and the Union Jack on the top was replaced by the tiranga.

The upper part of the tower collapsed in 1950, killing some local citizens. That resulted in a court case Municipal Corporation of Delhi v. Subhagwanti, AlR 1966 SC 1750 Mr. Chakravarty, the Municipal Engineer, mentioned that the building was 80 years old and the expected life of the structure of the top story, considering the type of mortar used, could be only 40 to 45 years, and the surviving middle story could be saved for another 10 years. The High Court also took into consideration the statement of a Mr. Puri that when he inspected the building after the collapse and examined the mortar, he found that the mortar was reduced to powder without any cementing properties.

The Municipal Corporation later allocated 2 lakh in 1957 for rebuilding, however, the structure had come to be known as an English relic, and thus it was never rebuilt.

== Legacy ==
The clock tower in Sabzi Mandi, Ramrup Tower, 1941, was inspired by the Ghantaghar tower, and it survives to this day.

== In popular culture ==
An old song recalls the clocktower (ghantaghar) that once stood in the center, and India's freedom struggle ( video search):

घंटाघर की चार घड़ी, चारों में ज़ंजीर पड़ी,
जब भी घंटा बजता था, खड़ा मुसाफिर हंसता था।
हँसता था वो बेधड़क आगे देखो नयी सड़क |
नयी सड़क पर बुआ बाजरा आगे देखो शहर शाहदरा |
शहर शाहदरा में लग गयी आग आगे देखो गजियाबाद |
गजियाबाद में फूटा अंडा उसमे से निकला तिरंगा झंडा |
झन्डे से आई आवाज़ इंक़लाब ज़िन्दाबाद ||

It recalls the satyagrah by Swami Shraddhanand in the 1930s near the Ghantaghar. Close the site, now his statue marks the event. The events are recalled in Ek Delhi Aur by Rajendra Sharma in the voice of a kan-mailya (ear cleaners of old Delhi)

When film producer B.R. Chopra made his comedy Hindi film Chandni Chowk (1954), he made sure that a replica of Ghantaghar is included.

== See also ==
- Ghantewala
- Nai Sarak
- Allahabad Clock Tower 1913
- St. James' Church, Delhi
- Secunderabad Clock Tower 1897
- Rajabai Clock Tower 1878
- List of clock towers
- Ghanta Ghar (Multan)
