= MCD Civic Centre =

Tallest current building in New Delhi, India

Coordinates: 28.6412°N 77.2277°E

Shyama Prasad Mukherjee Civic Centre (MCD) Delhi
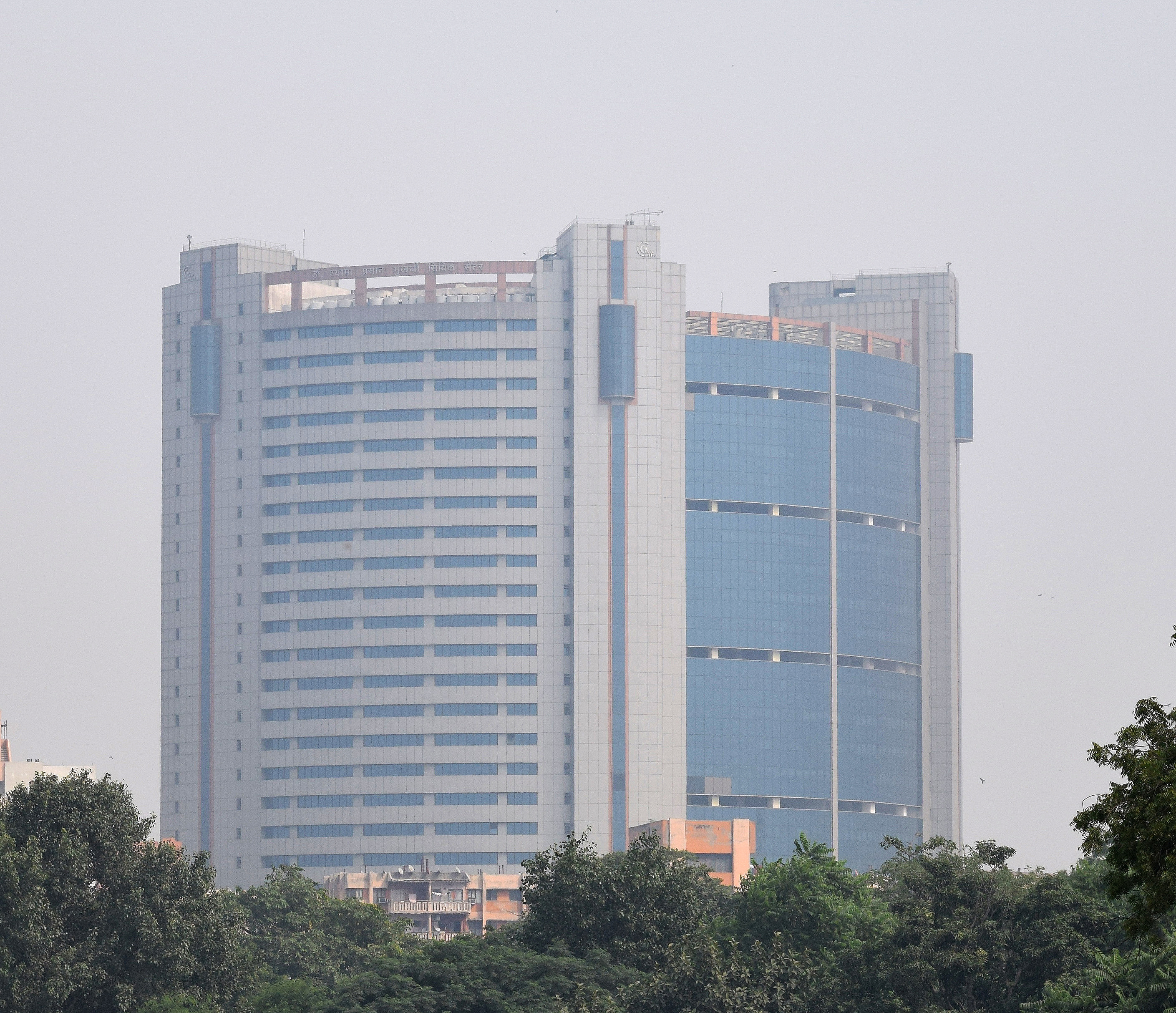

General information
- Type: Office
- Location: Minto Road New Delhi, India
- Construction started: 2006
- Completed: 2012

Height
- Antenna spire: 101 m (331 ft)
- Roof: 101 m (331 ft)

Technical details
- Floor count: 28

Municipal Corporation of Delhi Civic Centre is the tallest building in New Delhi at 101 metres and 28 floors.

== Construction ==
Built for Rs 500–650 crore, the building was designed by architect Shirish Malpani. He is a visiting faculty at School of Planning and Architecture, New Delhi. The maintenance of the building has been outsourced to a private company for Rs 8.33 crore/year.

== Architecture ==
The 28-storeyed MCD Civic Centre comprises five multi-storey blocks, with a total built-up floor area of approximately 1,16,000 sq metres excluding a three-level basement parking facility for about 2,500 equivalent car units, seven entry and exit gates, eight escalators, 43 passenger and service elevators, and 100 per cent power back-up. It is near Asaf Ali Road. MCD Civic Centre is surrounded by Tagore Road, Jawaharlal Nehru Road, Vivekananda Road, and Zakir Husain Delhi College.

It was inaugurated in April 2010, after 15 years of delays, and MCD offices shifted from Delhi Town Hall in Chandni Chowk.

== Public use ==
Since its inauguration, the Civic Centre has functioned as the primary administrative complex for the Municipal Corporation of Delhi (MCD). The building accommodates offices for taxation, engineering, health, licensing, and various civic services, consolidating departments that were previously dispersed across multiple locations in the city. The consolidation was intended to improve coordination among municipal units and to provide a single location for public-facing services. The complex also hosts regular committee meetings and civic sessions. Following the trifurcation of the Municipal Corporation of Delhi in 2012, the Civic Centre retained its role as a shared administrative hub for the newly created North, South, and East Delhi municipal bodies. Several departments continued to be housed within the building due to its substantial capacity and existing infrastructure. In contrast, others were redistributed across district-level offices.

== Location ==
The Civic Centre is located near major arterial and is accessible by bus routes and the nearby New Delhi Metro station. It is located in the administrative and commercial district of central Delhi, near government offices, commercial buildings, and educational institutions.

== See also ==
- Palika Kendra
