= Nai Sarak =

Street in New Delhi, India

Coordinates: 28.6533313°N 77.2285546°E

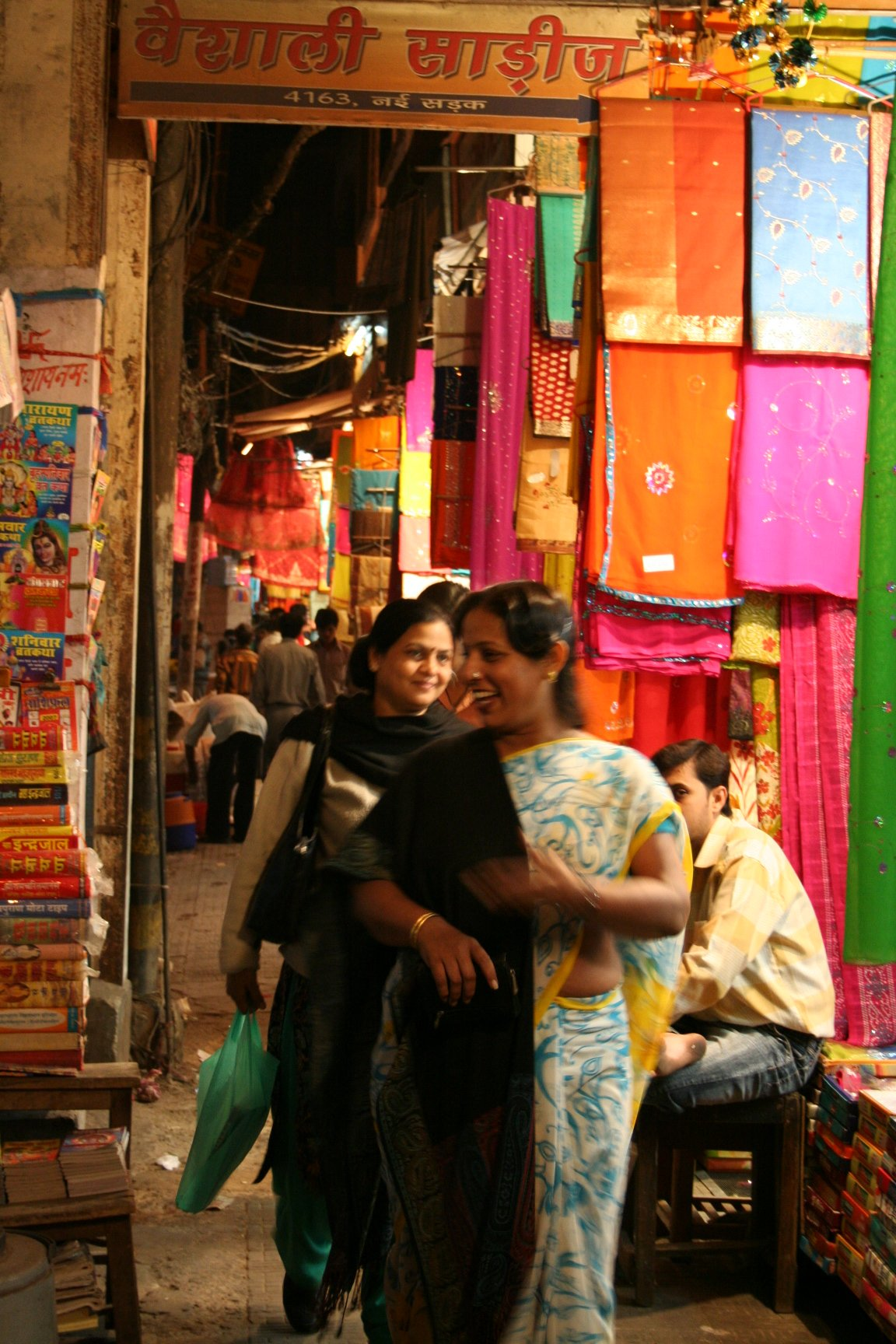
Nai Sarak Saree Shops in 2006

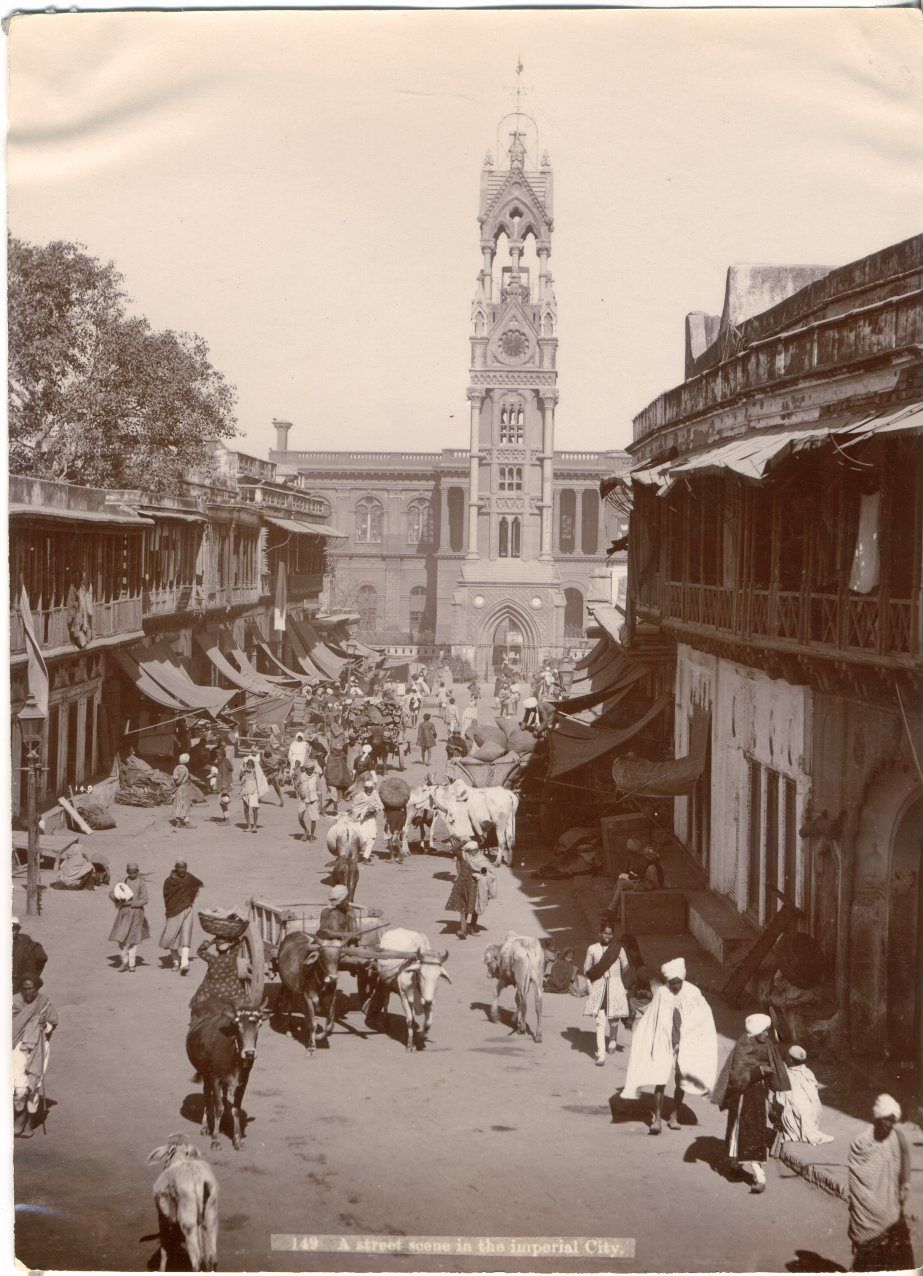
Nai Sarak overlooking the historic ghantaghar (now demolished), in 1910.

Nai Sarak meaning new street is the linking road, which connects the main Chandni Chowk Road to Chawri Bazar in Old Delhi and has a very big wholesale and retail market of mainly school and college textbooks. The street can be reached by taking a left turn after the Gali Paranthe Wali and just before the Katra Nawab Gali on the main Chandni Chowk Road. The other way to reach here is by taking a right turn from Chawri Bazar Road if coming from the Jama Masjid direction.

The street is called so because it is comparatively a new and broad road made by British after the war of 1857. It is lined with double-storey buildings mainly dominated by early 20th-century architecture. The lower storeys of these buildings have shops, which are specialized in special types of books like children's books or medical textbooks or books in different languages. Some shops specialize in stationery items as well as sell papers mostly used in offices. The market is today a busy thoroughfare and customers of all age can be seen here heading towards the shops that cater to their needs.

The market has also few wholesale shops of saris selling pure cotton, silk and embroidered ones among the many varieties available there. There are also one or two shops in the market that sells old and new musical instruments. The street mainly closed on Sunday.

== Etymology ==
Nai Sarak literally means "new road" in Hindi. When newly built, it was officially named Egerton Road but popularly called Nai Sarak.

== Textbook market ==
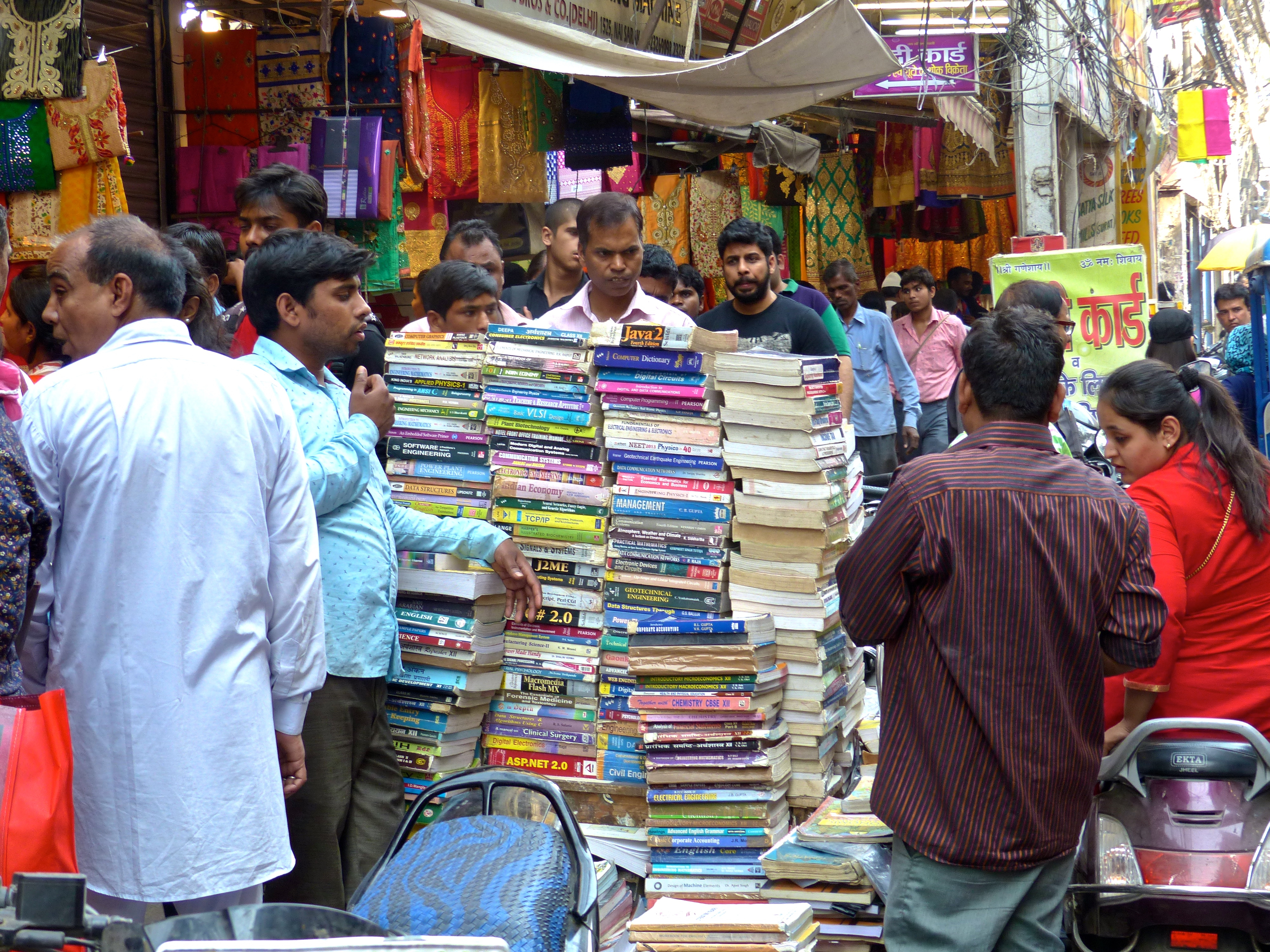
A makeshift stall for selling second-hand books at Nai Sarak in 2017.

Nai Sarak is known for being one of India's biggest textbook markets. It is also the oldest bookselling and publishing hub in Delhi. It became a hub when publishers and booksellers from Lahore moved to Delhi after the partition of India, and subsequently set up shop here. Most shopkeepers did business by buying and selling old books. Apart from shops, the footpaths also have small makeshift stalls where second hand books are arranged on tables and stools.

In the 1970s, many publishers moved their offices to Daryaganj which became India's biggest publishing hub by the 1990s. Since then, shops in Nai Sarak have gradually closed down due to dwindling business. In 2017, it was reported that sales had decreased by as much as 60 to 70 percent and many shops had closed down in the past year alone. This was attributed to the increasing popularity of online book stores, a rise in book piracy, increase in photocopying as well as foreign publishers setting up shop in India making new textbooks available for cheap.

== See also ==
- Ghantaghar
