= Husainabad Clock Tower =

Clock tower in India

Hussainabad Clock Tower
- Clock Tower
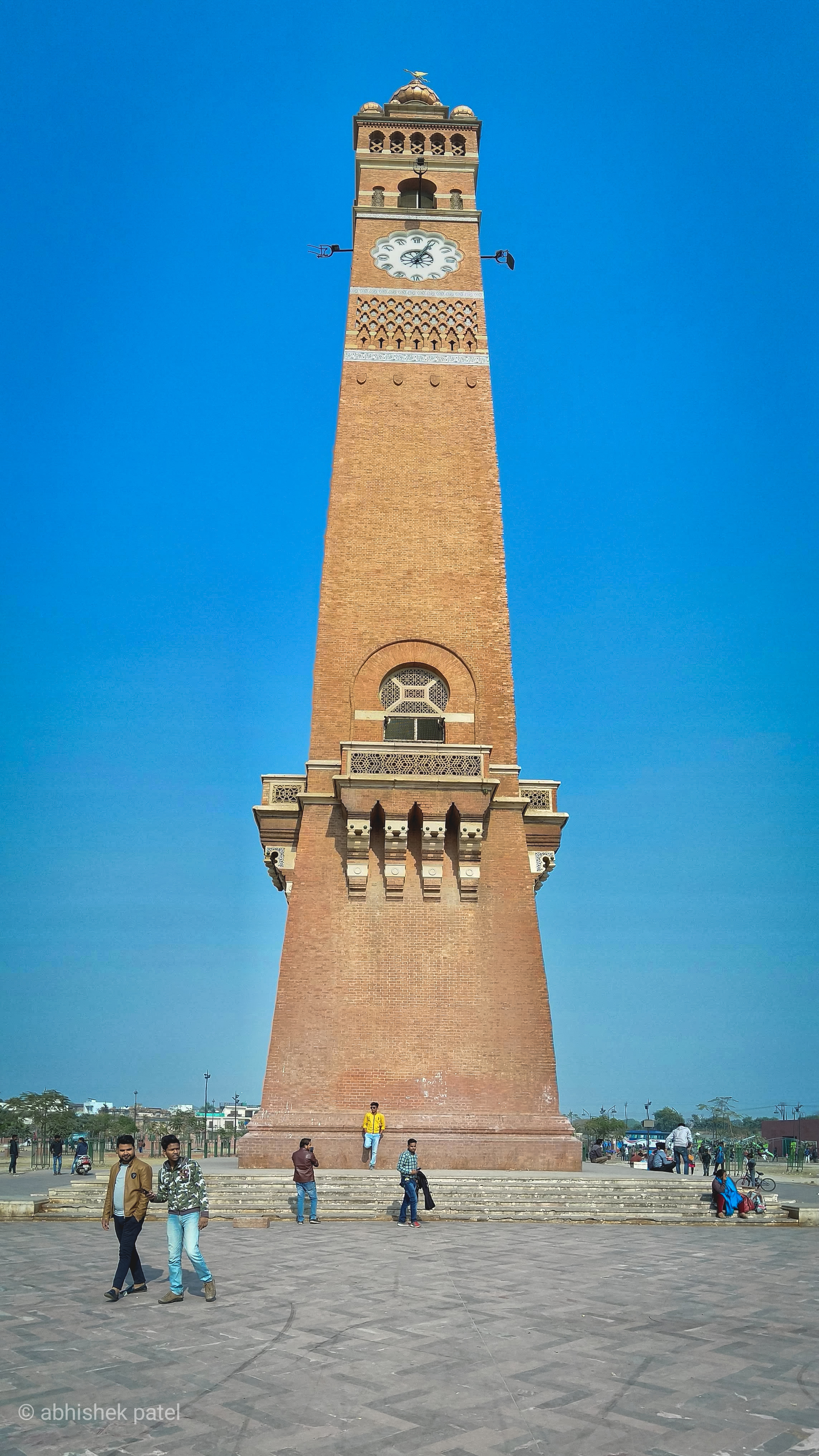
- Interactive map of Hussainabad Clock Tower
- Location: Lucknow
- Coordinates: 26°52′28″N 80°54′24″E
- Designer: Richard Roskell Bayne
- Type: victory column
- Height: 219 feet (67 m)
- Opening date: 1827-1837
- Dedicated to: Sir George Couper

Husainabad Clock Tower is a clock tower located in the Lucknow city of India. It was built in the late 19th century by Nasir-ud-Din Haidar Shah to mark the arrival of Sir George Couper, the lieutenant governor of North-West Province. It was built at a cost 1.75 Lakhs Rs. The tower showcases a fusion of Mughal and Victorian architectural elements.

== History ==
It is located adjacent to the Rumi Darwaza, near to Bara Imambara and Teele Wali Masjid. Built in the year 1881, Husainabad Clock Tower is adjudged as the tallest among all the clock towers in India.

Richard Roskell Bayne designed this structure, 67 metres (220 ft) in height, and it reflects Victorian and Gothic style structural designs. Gunmetal is used for building the clock parts. Its gigantic pendulum has a length of 14 feet, and the dial of the clock is designed in the shape of a 12-fully gold flower and bells around it.

== Clock tower ==
Husainabad Clock Tower

In 2010, the district administration decided to replace the clock. But then two samaritans Captain Paritosh Chauhan and Akhilesh Agarwal approached the administration to allow them to repair it so that the mechanical clock is not replaced with an electronic one. It was Captain Chauhan's passion and love for his city that he requested the then DM, Amit Ghosh to give him a chance to repair it. They worked on it for three years and reconstructed the entire clock on a pro bono basis.

On 13 April 2010, they began working and were able to make the defunct clock functional by 28 October 2010. Finally, on 13 September 2011, they made the giant clock tower chime, after a silence of 27 long years.
