= Satyavati Devi =

Participant in Indian independence movement

- Born: 26 January 1906; Jullundur, Punjab Province, British India
- Died: 21 October 1945 (aged 39); Delhi, British India
- Known for: Participation in Indian independence movement

Satyavati Devi (26 January 1906 — 21 October 1945) was a participant in Indian independence movement. She was considered to be the Joan of Arc of India. (Note: Writeup by Jaiprakash Narain, in "Dilli Ki Joan of Arc, Behan Satyavati" souvenir published in 1977 commemorating Satyavati's 70th birth anniversary.)

== Family ==
She was the granddaughter of Swami Shraddhanand, and the daughter of advocate Dhani Ram and Ved Kumari. She married an officer of the Delhi Cloth Mills.

== Activism ==
Among nationalist women in Delhi, Satyavati took a leadership role. Aruna Asaf Ali credits Satyavati with motivating her to join the nationalist movement. Satyavati undertook social work among mill workers at textile mills in Gwalior and Delhi. She founded the Congress Mahila Samaj and Congress Desh Sevika Dal and she also co-founded the Congress Socialist Party. She took an active part in civil disobedience movement. During civil disobedience movement she became the leader of the women wing of the congress in Delhi. She organised the breaking of the Salt Law in Delhi where she and a group of volunteers manufactured and distributed packets of illegal salt to people gathered there. She was arrested by the police and was sentenced to two years imprisonment in 1932. While she was imprisoned in the jail she contracted pleurisy and tuberculosis. While at jail, despite being very ill, she refused to give a bond of good behaviour and assurance that she would desist from political activity, that could have secured her release and hope for treatment. She died in 1945 at the age of 39 from tuberculosis.

== Writings ==
Jailed female political freedom fighters composed poems and nationalist tracts, which were smuggled out and published. One of the pieces written by Satyavati Devi, titled ‘Bahin Satyavati Ka Jail Sandesh’ (Sister Satyavati's Prison Message) goes as follows:

This is a message from your jailed sister
Sister Satyavati appeals to you
Do not slacken from your work
Jump, if required, into the burning flames
The sacred battle should be full of strength
Once you have stepped forward, never retreat
Die before the men in the battlefield
Do not fear bullets or sticks
Put your head forward before the men
Once lit, the fire should never go out
I have full faith now
Because the women have prepared themselves (Note: Copied verbatim from the referred article.)

This and other writings and prison songs seemed to be aimed at motivating and mobilising women to enter India's independence movement.

== Recognition ==
Although she is believed to be an unsung hero of India's freedom struggle, Satyawati College (Delhi University) established by the government of Delhi in 1972 is named after her.
