= Delhi Town Hall =

Town Hall of Delhi

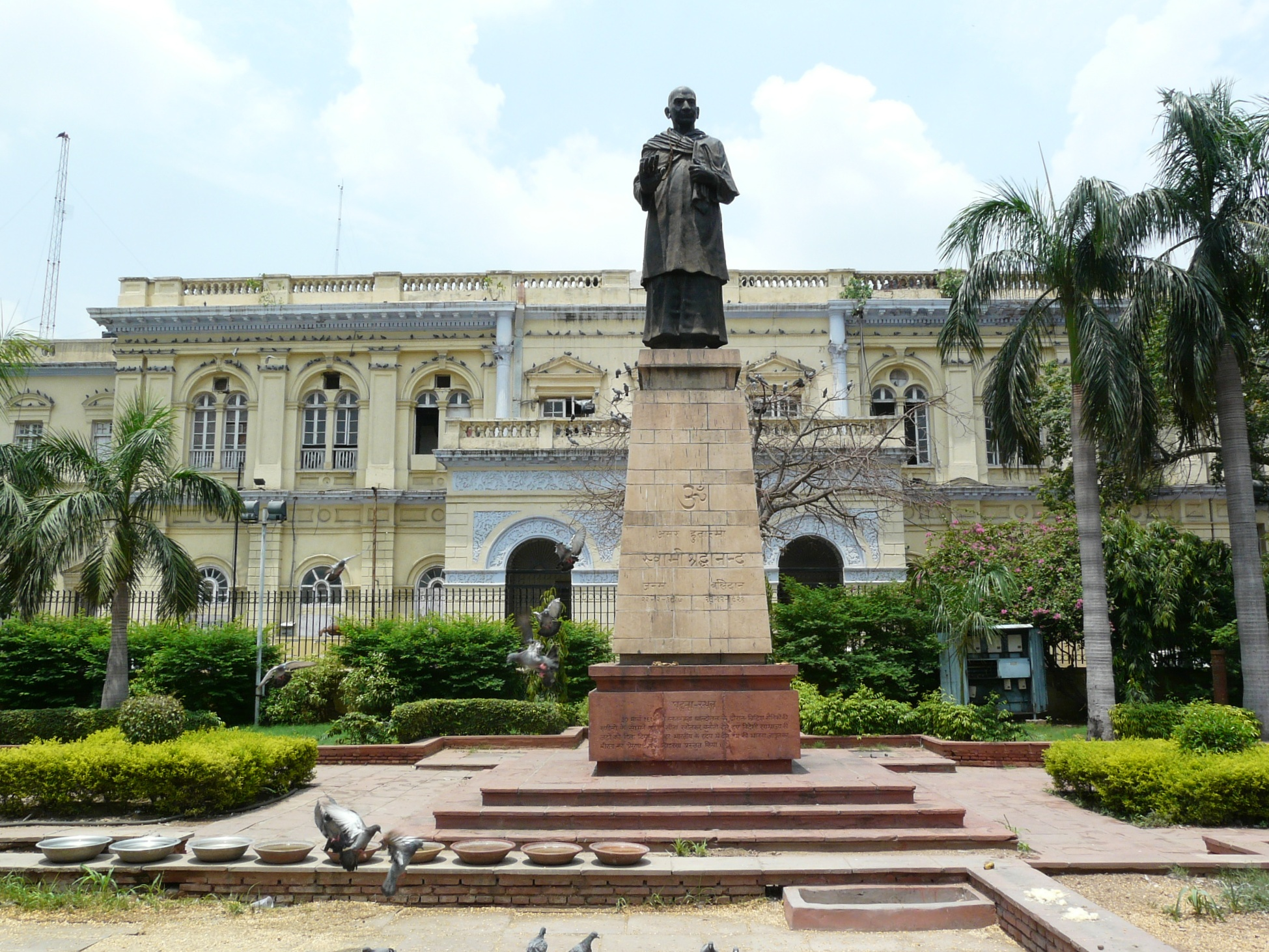
- Town Hall
- Interactive map of the Delhi Town Hall area

General information
- Type: Town hall
- Architectural style: Victorian architecture, Edwardian architecture
- Location: Delhi; India
- Coordinates: 28.657286°N 77.227492°E
- Construction started: 1860
- Completed: 1863
- Cost: ₹1.35 lakh (equivalent to ₹6.2 crore or US$640,000 in 2023)
- Owner: Municipal Corporation of Delhi

Technical details
- Floor count: 2

The Delhi Town Hall is a landmark heritage building located at Chandni Chowk in Old Delhi. It previously served the seat of the Municipal Corporation of Delhi (MCD) from 1866 during the imperial British administration to late 2009, where upon its headquarters relocated to the new MCD Civic Centre on Minto Road in Central Delhi. Architecturally, it features characteristics of the Victorian/Edwardian-style, with a yellow-painted brick and stone mansion in conjunction with carved white-stone trim. It is officially protected as a high-grade heritage building.

In the 21st century, however, the Town Hall has fallen largely into disuse and become dilapidated, prompting repeated restoration and adaptive-reuse proposals as a museum, heritage hotel, and so on by the municipal government.

== History ==
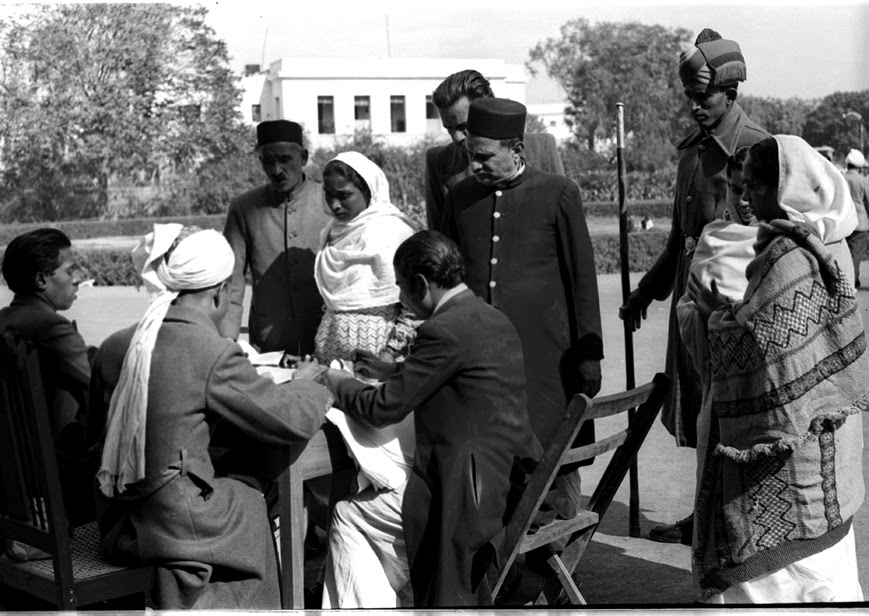
Polling station at the Town Hall in 1952

The Delhi Town Hall building was constructed in the aftermath of the 1857 Rebellion, when the British rebuilt many institutions in Delhi. Foundation for the project was laid in 1860 and construction finished three years later. Its original name was the Lawrence Institute of Educational and Cultural Affairs (often simply Lawrence Institute), serving as a colonial-era cultural complex that contained a museum, a reading room, a library and meeting rooms for the European community. Historian Swapna Liddle notes that that "one important centre for cultural and modern intellectual pursuits" in post-1857 Delhi was this Lawrence Institute. In 1866, Delhi’s municipality bought the Lawrence Institute for ₹1.35 lakh (equivalent to ₹6.2 crore or US$640,000 in 2023), renaming it to the Town Hall and converting it into the headquarters for civic administration.

During the late 19th and early 20th centuries, Town Hall served as the city’s main municipal office. It also continued to house the European Club and library that had been part of the Lawrence Institute, while new municipal offices and committee rooms occupied other sections of the building. It survived major earthquakes in 1905 and 1952 with some damage, and was repaired thereafter. Originally, a bronze statue of Queen Victoria stood in front of the Town Hall, signifying the colonial rule of Britain. After independence, this statue was removed and replaced by one of Swami Shraddhanand, a Hindu Arya Samaj leader. The original statue now stands in Delhi College of Art premises.

After India’s independence, the Town Hall remained the centre of Delhi’s municipal government. The Delhi Municipal Corporation Act (1957) created a unified Municipal Corporation of Delhi (MCD) to administer the city, and Town Hall continued as its headquarters. In 1947, the municipal council chamber was inaugurated within its premises; a quotation from Mahatma Gandhi on the privilege of being a municipal councillor (unveiled by Sardar Patel in 1950) was engraved on the chamber’s outer wall.

In the early 21st century, however, Delhi’s municipal administration outgrew the historic building. Following the bifurcation and later trifurcation of the Municipal Corporation in 2012, the North, South and East Delhi Municipal Corporations jointly decided to move their offices to new premises. The 28-storey Shyama Prasad Mukherjee Civic Centre on Minto Road (Central Delhi) opened in 2010 as the modern headquarters for the unified MCD. Thereafter, Town Hall ceased to function as an administrative office. It has stood largely vacant since about 2012. Occasionally, it has been used for minor civic purposes (for example, as an “election work” office), but by the mid-2020s it had no permanent public utility.

== Architecture ==
The Town Hall is a distinguished example of colonial-period civic architecture in Delhi. It is a two-storey stuccoed masonry building, built of yellow-painted brick and stone with white carved stone. Its overall design fuses Victorian and Edwardian elements, heavy British urban styles of the late 19th century with some local (Mughal-inspired) landscaping. The exterior walls are bright yellow with white pillars, arches and cornices. Two broad porticos flank the front façade. According to The Times of India, the building was "erected in 1863 in brick and stone, painted yellow and white". It covers a large area: the central block plus two wings (east and west) comprise some 13,735 square metres of floor space, and the entire site (including grounds and gardens) spans roughly 16 acres.

The front of the Town Hall originally faced the Chowk Bazaar area. The grounds include formal gardens on the south (towards Chandni Chowk) and the north sides, laid out in a Mughal influenced style. The south garden features an octagonal fountain basin with a long alley of fountains leading to it. These gardens once belonged to Princess Jahanara, daughter of Shah Jahan. A circular stone pedestal in one of the courtyards hoists a statue of Mahatma Gandhi atop a pillar, with inscriptions in English, Hindi and Urdu on the pedestal illustrating his ideals of self-reliance.

In the 1860s, the British erected a 130-foot clock tower next to the Town Hall, known as the Northbrook Tower (or simply Ghantaghar) after the Viceroy Lord Northbrook. This tall tower became an Old Delhi landmark. However, in 1951, its upper storey collapsed in a tragic accident, and the unsafe structure was dismantled by 1955. Only the base remained, but even following demolition, the neighbourhood continued to be called Ghantaghar.

== Conservation ==
In recent decades, Delhi Town Hall’s historical importance has been recognised by heritage authorities, but its preservation has been uneven. The building is listed as a heritage structure (Grade A by INTACH, or Grade I under development norms), which theoretically protects its facade and design. Thanks to decades of institutional neglect, the structure has deteriorated. Officials reported plaster erosion from water seepage, exposed reinforcing bars and crumbling interiors due to lack of maintenance.

In 2010, shortly before the new Civic Centre opened, Delhi’s civic body floated the idea of turning the dilapidated Town Hall into a high-end heritage hotel, possibly with an added museum or cultural complex. In late 2023, the Municipal Corporation of Delhi again moved to preserve Town Hall as a civic museum. Both the North and South MCDs announced the building would be refurbished and converted into a municipal history museum.

Recognising the emergency, conservation experts from the state archaeology department and the Archaeological Survey of India inspected the site in 2024 and recommended a comprehensive restoration plan. As of 2025, Town Hall remains a protected yet endangered heritage site. The municipal authorities have announced restoration efforts, but actual work is only beginning to materialise lately. Conservationists note that physical repairs are urgent to prevent collapse of walls and floors.

In 2026, a revised proposal floated by the Chief Minister of Delhi at the sidelines of the 2026 state budget session envisages its redevelopment into a "global heritage center", depicting aspects of Delhi's cultural heritage.

== See also ==
- Palika Kendra
