= Chandni Chowk =

- Neighborhood of Delhi
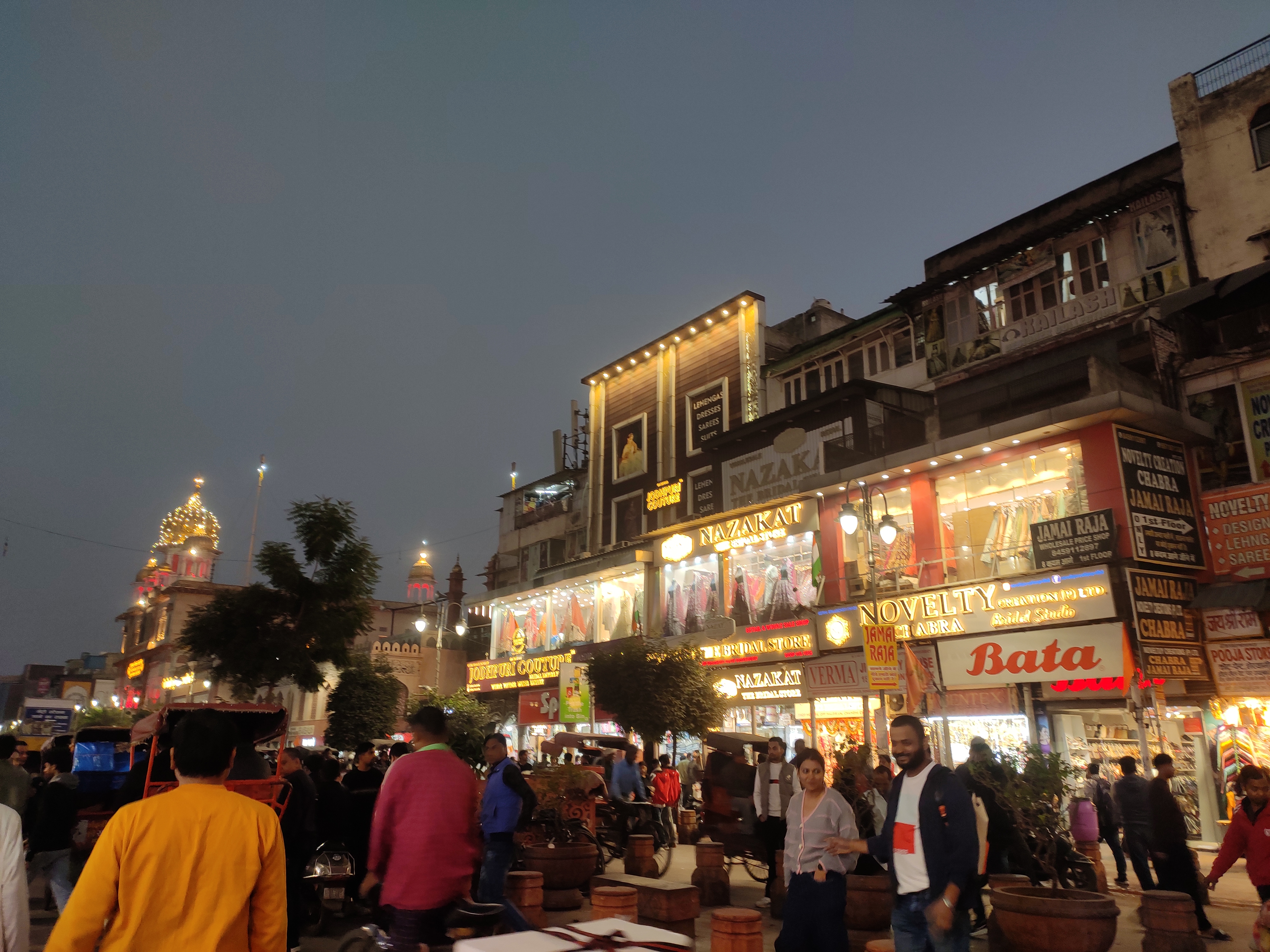

- Location in Delhi, India Chandni Chowk (India)
- Coordinates: 28.656°N 77.231°E
- Country: India
- Union Territory: Delhi
- District: Old Delhi
- Metro: Chandni Chowk
- Established: 1650

Area
  - Total: 5.6 km^{2} (2.2 sq mi)

Population
  - Total: 193,402
  - Density: 35,000/km^{2} (89,000/sq mi)

Languages
  - Official: Hindi, Urdu
- Time zone: UTC+5:30 (IST)
- PIN: 110 006
- Vehicle registration: DL
- Planning agency: MCD
- Website: https://delhitourism.travel/chandni-chowk-delhi

Chandni Chowk (meaning "Moonlight Square") is a street market square located in Old Delhi, India. One of the oldest and busiest markets in Delhi, the Mughal-era Red Fort straddles the eastern fringes of Chandni Chowk. It was built in 1650 by the Mughal Emperor, Shah Jahan, and designed by his daughter, Jahanara. The street spanning the market was historically divided by canals, engineered to reflect moonlight. These canals have since been closed and destroyed following British occupation, leaving behind a transformed urban landscape predisposed to congestion and chaos. It remains one of India's largest wholesale markets.

== History ==
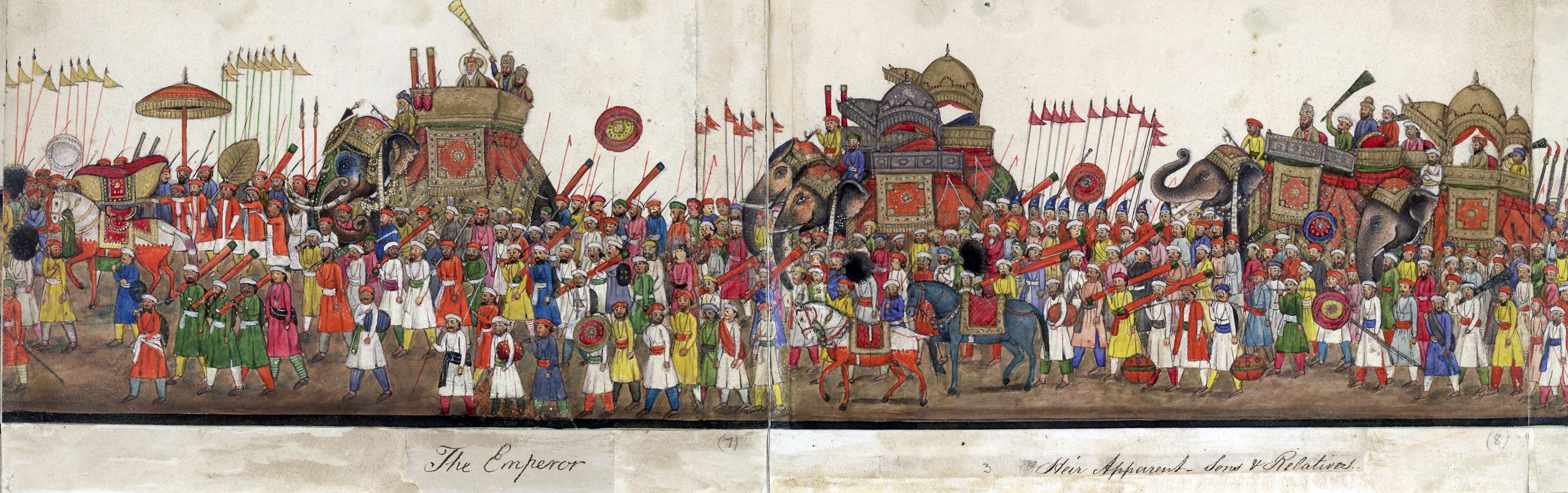
Procession of the Emperor Bahadur Shah II trawling through Chandni Chowk in 1843 on Eid.

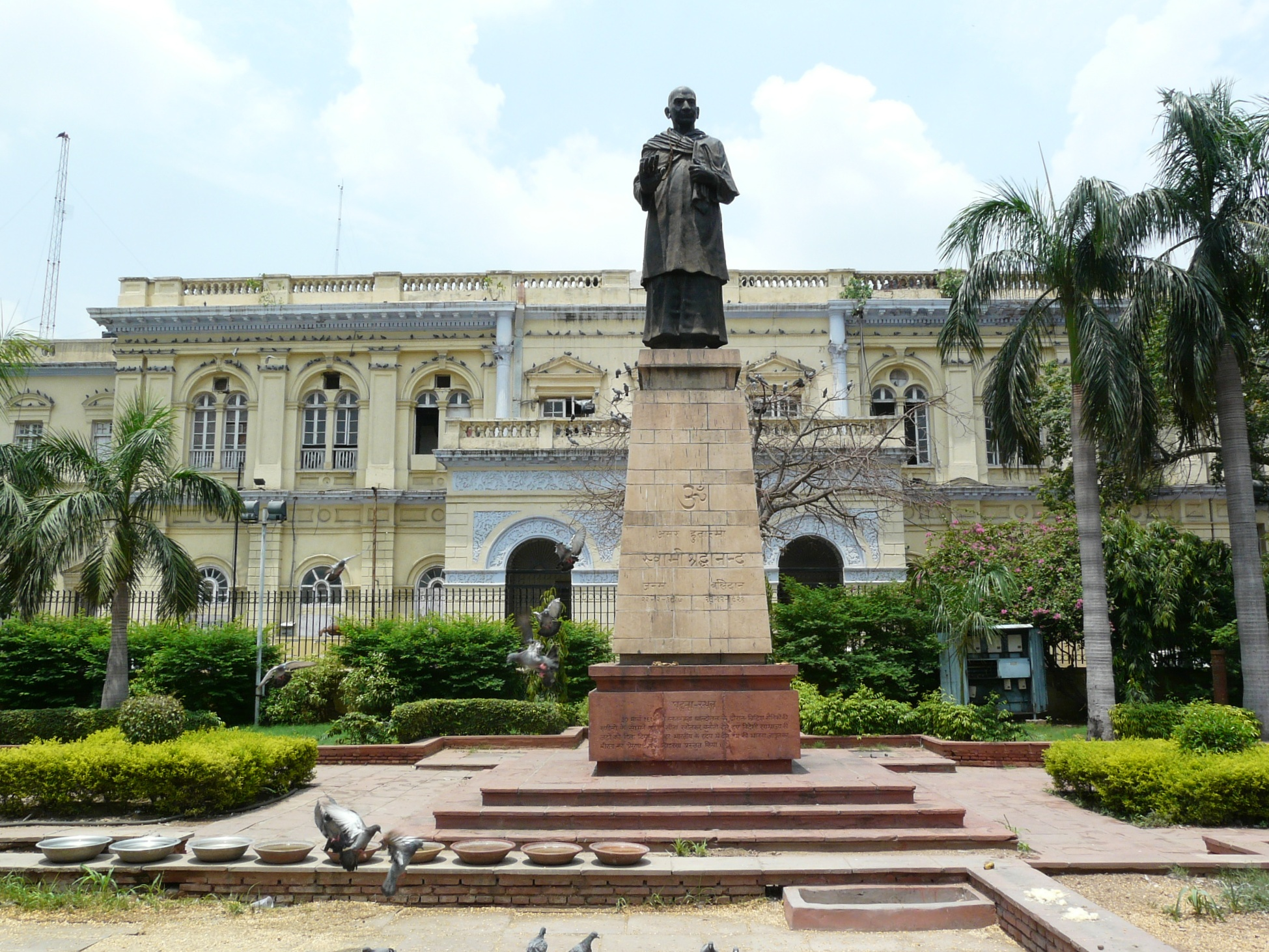
Delhi Town Hall

The market's history dates to the founding of the capital city of Shahjahanabad when Emperor Shah Jahan established the Red Fort on the banks of the Yamuna River, hemming his new capital from the east.

=== Original Chandni Chowk ===
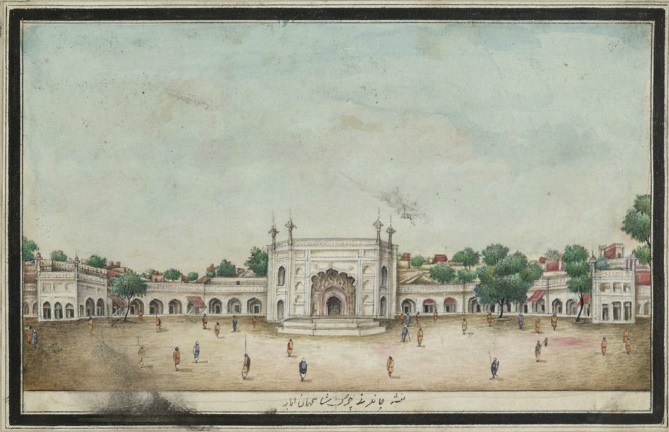
Jahanara Begum's caravanserai, which comprised an integral component of the original Chandni Chowk (from Sir Thomas Theophilus Metcalf's 1843 album)

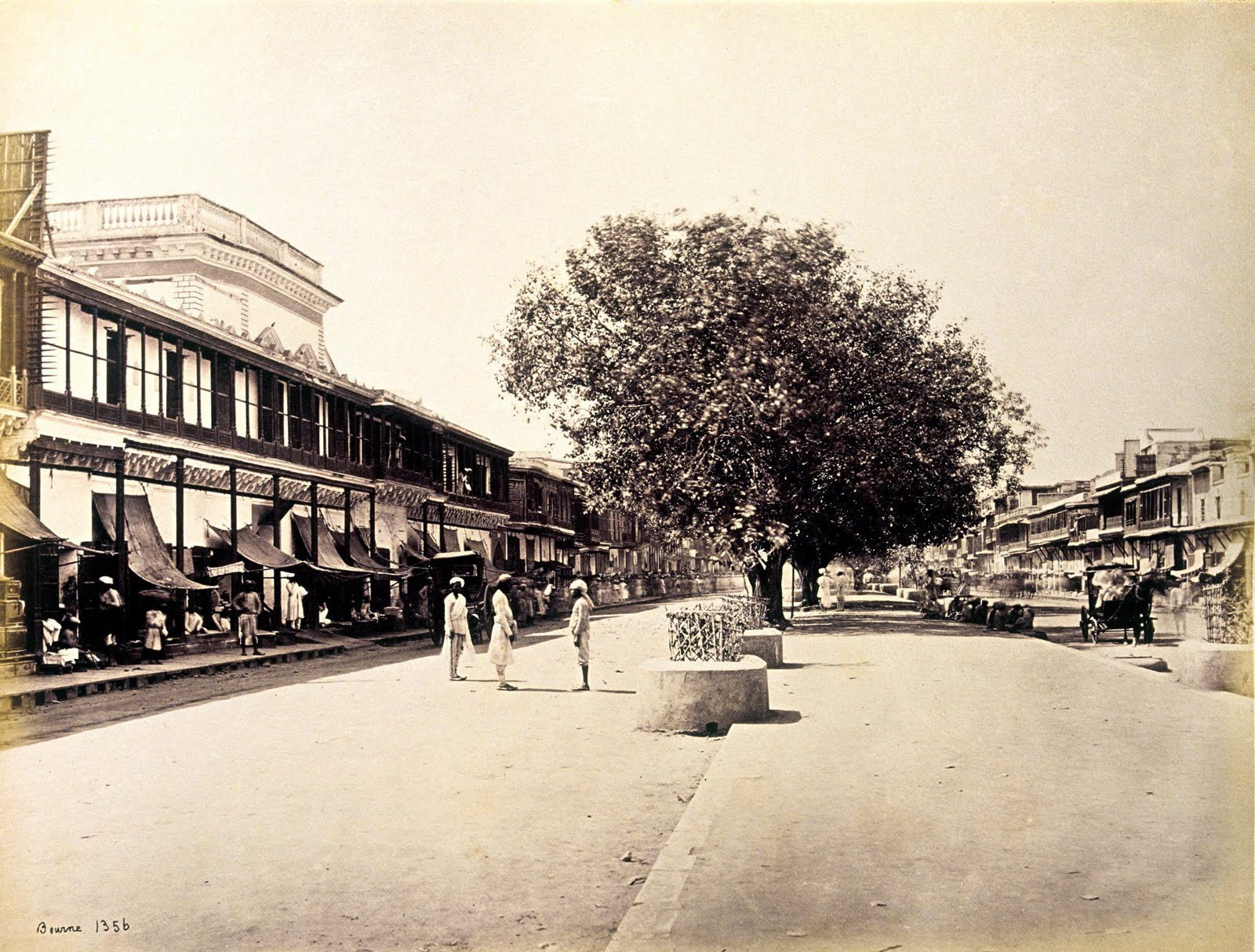
Chandni Chowk in the 1860s

The original Chandni Chowk, a half-moon-shaped square, was situated before the Townhall, the latter of which itself was constructed by the colonial administration following British victory in the 1857 Rebellion; the reflection of the square used to shimmer in the moonlit water pool located at the front. A shallow water channel, whose source was the Yamuna, ran through the middle of the straight street now referred to as the Chandni Chowk bazaar, with roads and shops on either side of the channel. This road had three bazaars.

Chandni Chowk ("moonlight square") and its three bazaars were designed and established in 1650 by Princess Jahanara Begum, Shah Jahan's favourite daughter. Originally consisting of 1,560 shops, the bazaar was 40 yards wide and 1,520 yards long. The bazaar, fashioned to resemble a square, was accorded ample elegance by the presence of a pool at the complex's center. The pool glimmered under the moonlight, a characteristic that inspired its name.

The shops were originally arranged in a distinctive half-moon pattern, a design that has since been lost or altered over time. The bazaar gained renown for its thriving silver trade, leading to its association with silver merchants. This prominence earned it the moniker Silver Street—a name rooted in its Hindi counterpart, wherein silver is called Chandi.

The term Chandni, which is closely derived from Chandi, further emphasizes the cultural and linguistic connection to the bazaar's identity. The pool at the square was replaced by a clock tower (Ghantaghar) in the 1870s. The centre of the market is still referred to as Ghantaghar. Chandni Chowk was once the grandest Indian market. Chandni Chowk was a significant route for Mughal imperial processions, hosting the grand displays of emperors and their entourages, highlighting its importance in the empire's cultural and architectural heritage. The tradition of grand processions through Chandni Chowk continued during the Delhi Durbar of 1903. Meanwhile, the British contributed to the area's Occidental architectural heritage by constructing the Delhi Town Hall in 1863.

=== Original three bazaars ===
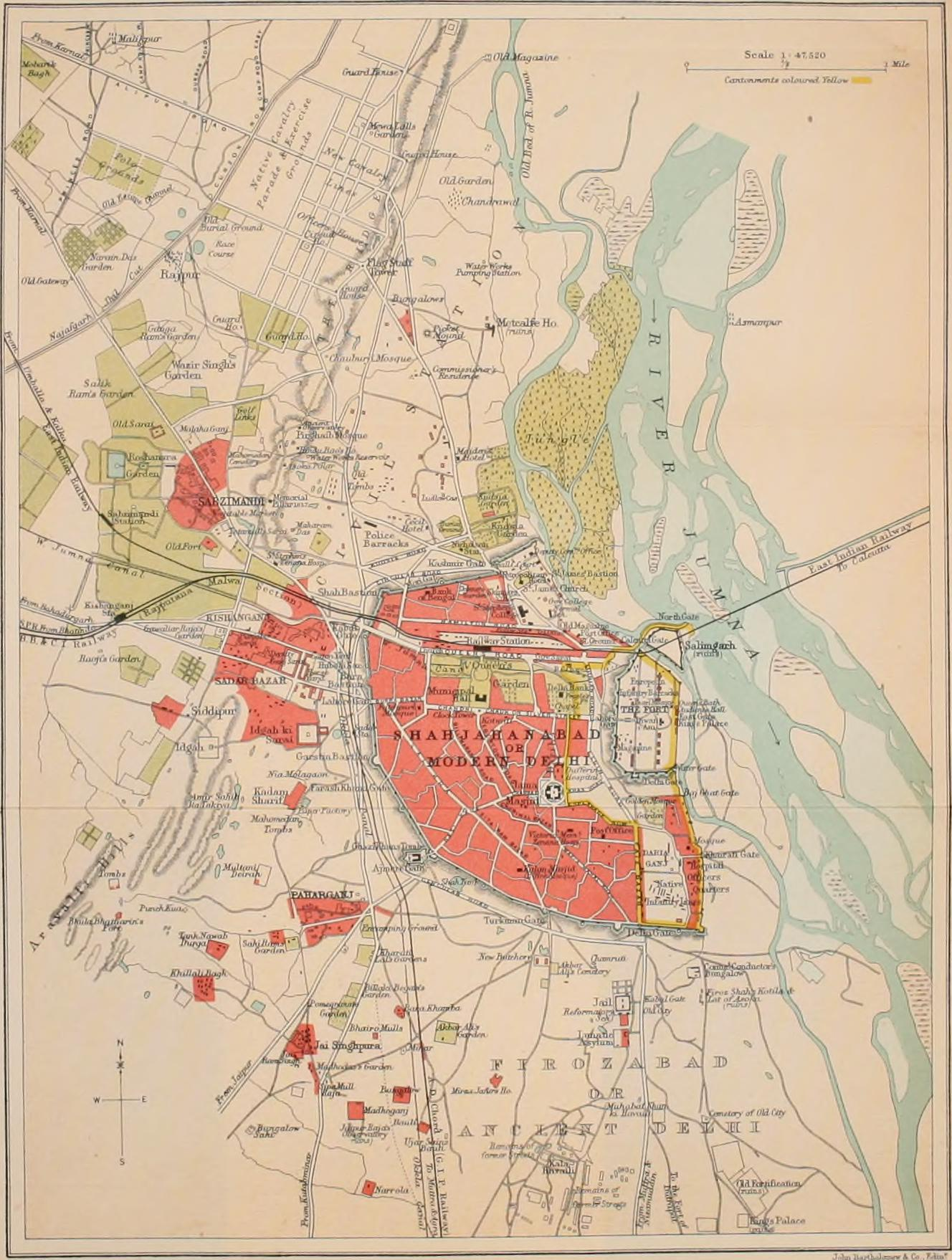
Shahjahanabad: Chandni Chowk, a central horizontal street within the walled city, featured a half-moon-shaped square illuminated by moonlight, located in front of the Municipal Hall. The road was divided into three equal sections, forming the Urdu Bazaar, Johri Bazaar, and Fatehpuri Bazaar. c. 1911

The term Chandni Chowk previously referred only to the square that hosted the reflecting pool. Today, the entirety of the stretch that spans the middle of the walled city, from the Lahori Gate of the Red Fort to the Fatehpuri Masjid, is known as Chandni Chowk. The road was subsequently trifurcated into the following bazaars:

- Urdu Bazar: the stretch spanning from Lahori Gate of Red Fort to Chowk Kotwali near Gurudwara Sis Ganj Sahib was called Urdu Bazaar, i.e., the encampment market. The Urdu language received its name from this encampment. Ghalib noted the destruction of this market during the disturbances of the Indian Rebellion of 1857 and its aftermath.
- Johri Bazar: the Chowk Kotwali to Chandni Chowk section of the straight road was originally called Johri Bazar.
- Fatehpuri Bazar: Chandni Chowk to Fatehpuri Masjid section of the straight road was originally called the Fatehpuri Bazar.

While the contemporary market is blighted with congestion, the market still retains its historical character.

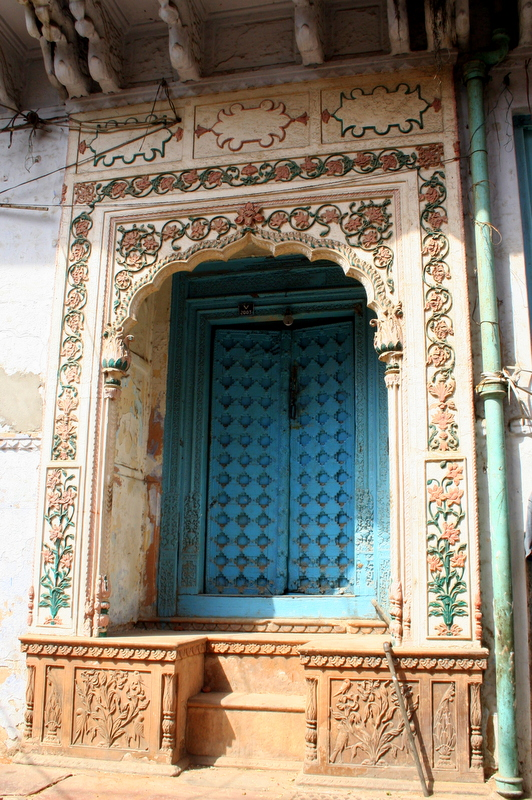
Naughara mansions in Kinari Bazaar

=== Kucha, katra and havelis ===
The road now called Chandni Chowk had several streets branching off of it, which were referred to as kuchas (streets/wings). Each kucha usually had several katras (cul de sac or guild houses), which in turn had several havelis. The following terms are generally used to describe the buildings and the streets:

- Mohalla (neighborhood): a residential neighbourhood with kuchas and katras within kuchas.
- Kucha or Gali (street): Kucha in the Persian language is synonymous with "Gali" or street in the Hindi language. It is a street or a zone with houses whose owners shared some common attributes, usually their occupation. Hence the names Kucha Maliwara (the gardeners' street) and Kucha Ballimaran (the oarsmen's street). Kuchas either had rows of large Havelis or gated cul de sac (dead end) "Katra" marketplaces along with them.
- Kucha mahajani: is one of the biggest gold-trading hubs and wholesale jewellery markets in Asia.
- Katra (gated cul-de-sac courtyard market-cum-residential complex in a street): are one-room quarters around a court with a single narrow entrance and inhabited by people of the same caste or occupation i.e. a zone with houses whose owners shared some common attribute, usually their occupation, hence the name. Katra refers to a separate wing of tradesmen and craftsmen belonging to the same trade. They usually lived and worked together in a gated cul de sac, the doors of which could be closed at night for the protection of the merchandise, equipment, workers and their families. It is a system similar to the guild housing in Amsterdam such as Handboogdoelen and Voetboogdoelen.
- Haveli (mansion): A normal haveli has a big courtyard (atrium) surrounded on four sides by spacious rooms and often another walled courtyard around the exterior. Historic havelis include:
  - Begum Samru's palace built in 1806, now called Bhagirath Palace, see.
  - Dharampura Haveli, Gali Guliyan, designed in late Mughal style although parts show the influence of 20 Century architecture. During Mughal and late Mughal Period, a large numbers of Havelis were built by courtiers.
  - Chunnamal haveli in Katra Neel
  - Ghalib ki Haveli of Mirza Ghalib, Gali Qasim Jan (Gali Ballimaran)
  - Haksar Haveli in Sita Ram Bazar, where Jawaharlal Nehru was married on 8 February 1916 to Kamla Nehru. She was born here, and her family sold it in the 1960s. Haveli used to host mushairas
  - Haveli Banarsi Bhawan with a water well is situated near to Shree Digambar Meru Jain Temple in the Masjid Khajoor area.
  - Haveli Naharwali in Kucha Sadullah Khan, where Pervez Musharraf, the former president of Pakistan was born; his grandfather sold the mansion to Prem Chand Gola, after whom this area is now called Gola Market. This residence was originally owned by Raja Nahar Khan, the ruler of Mewat who embraced Islam and left Hinduism during the era of Firuz Shah Tughlaq in 1355, hence the name.
  - Khazanchi haveli: the Khajanchis were the accountants of Shah Jahan. A street is named after them called "Gali Khajanchi", consisting of a long tunnel connecting the haveli and the Red Fort, constructed in furtherance of secure transfer of funds between them. It is close to the entrance of Chandni Chowk. The haveli is situated at the end of the road that connects Dariba and Esplanade Road.
  - Haveli Raja Jugal Kishore, a grand mansion with an imposing gate, which was adorned with a large ghanta-bell. A room in the haveli, located adjacent to the gate, which opened towards the street, was given to Lala Sukhlal by the owners of the haveli as a philanthropic gesture to open a confectionary business, which came to be identified as "Ghante ke Neechewala Halwaii" (see Ghantewala). A street is named after the haveli; Kucha-i-Haveli Raja Jugal Kishore, which runs between Kucha Maliwara and Kotwali Chabutra.
  - Naughara Mansions in Naughara Gali off Kinari Bazaar has 18th century mansions whose proprietors were Jain. It is a street with nine (nau) continuous haveli, adorned with brightly painted floral designs on the facade. Each of the havelis used to have a gharha (water pot) placed at door for the thirsty passersby. Located at the end of the street is a white marble Jain Svetambara Temple with stone elephant heads at the door, intricate carvings on walls and pillars, a museum on the ground floor with rare manuscripts embroidered in pure gold and silver threads and a black image of Lord Parasanath in the rare kasauti stone on the first floor.
  - Zeenat Mahal Haveli, located in Lal Kuan Bazar, was the mansion of the queen consort of the last Mughal emperor, Bahadur Shah Zafar.

Some other commonly used terms are Chatta (the upper floor which arches over the street below), phatak (door, usually to a katra or street which could be locked at night), mahal (a palace, as in Taj Mahal), kamra (a room), kuan (waterwell), and so on.

=== Historic religious buildings ===
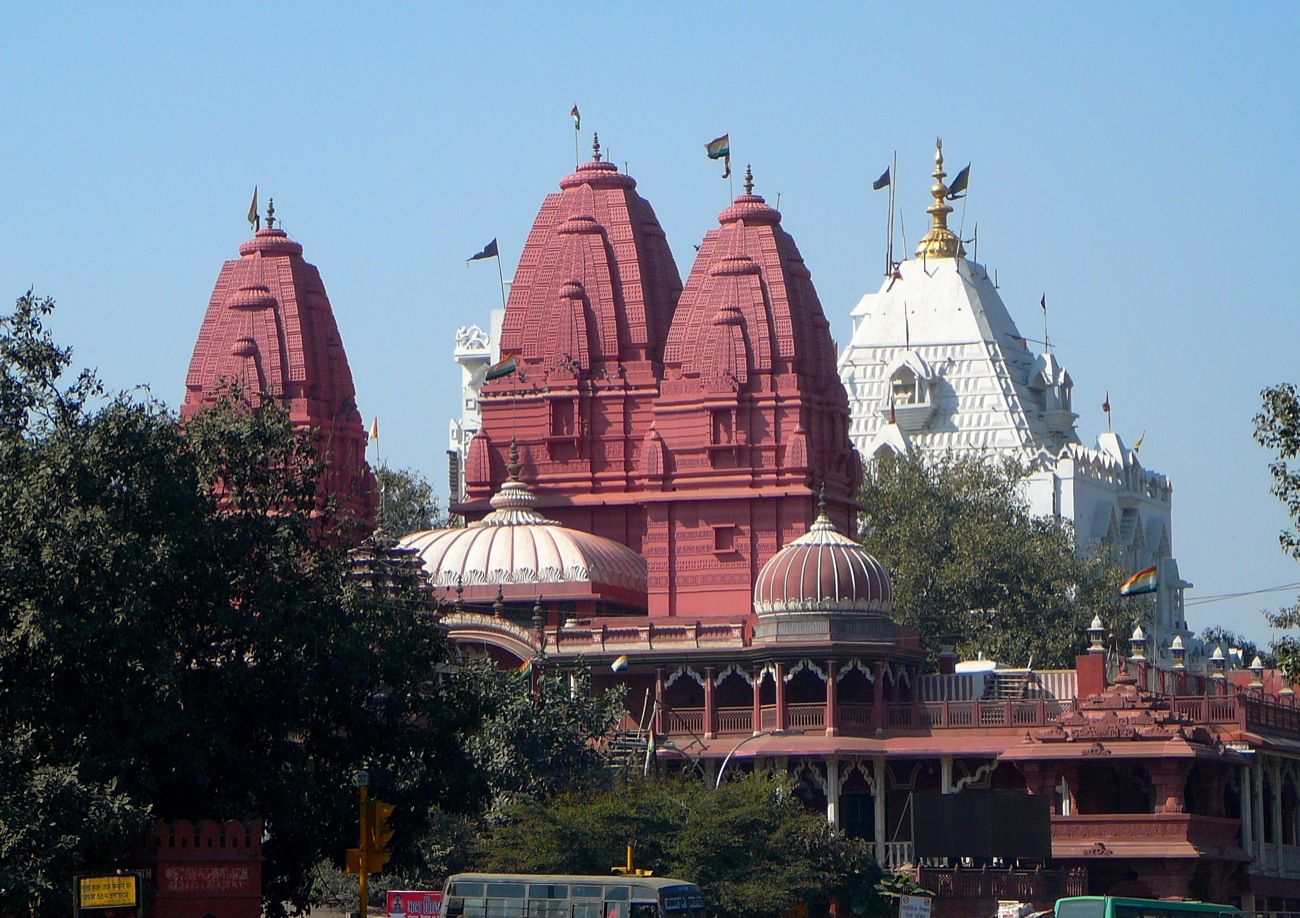
Lal Jain Mandir and Gauri Shankar temple in the background

Delhi's most prominent mosque, Jama Masjid, built in 1650 in the vicinity, is near other religious shrines, belonging to multiple religions. Starting from the Red Fort, the buildings include:

- The Sri Digambar Jain Lal Mandir, established in 1656 with a bird hospital established in 1929. The Naya Mandir (literally New Temple) was built in 1807 in Dharampura, as the first temple with a Shikhar.
- The Gauri Shankar Temple was built by a Maratha general Appa Gangadhar, according to one of the legends.
- The Central Baptist Church, constructed in 1814.
- The Gurdwara Sis Ganj Sahib: the ninth Sikh guru, Tegh Bahadur, and his followers Bhai Mati Das, Bhai Dyal Das and Bhai Sati Das were executed by the Mughals nearby in 1675. The place of worship took root as a series of memorials built in 1783 after Delhi, the Mughal capital, was captured briefly by the Dal Khalsa (the combined military forces of eleven Sikh states) under the command of Baghel Singh at a time the Mughal Empire had waned significantly, both militarily and territorially. Under the settlement negotiated for the withdrawal of the occupying Sikh forces, the Mughals were compelled to grant them concessions to build several gurudwaras in the imperial capital, one of which happened to be Sis Ganj Sahib. The present structure gracing the site, however, was built much later in 1930.
- The Sunehri Masjid was built in 1721 by Roshan-Ud-Daula Zafar Khan during the reign of Mohammad Shah. Persian invader Nader Shah spent several hours on the top of the mosque on 11 March 1739 to observe the Katl-e-Aam (the killing of public) that he had ordered, resulting in 30,000 deaths.
- The Fatehpuri Masjid was built in 1650 by Fatehpuri Begum, one of the queens of Shah Jahan.

== Present ==
Flanking both sides of the wide Chandni Chowk are historical residential areas served by narrow lanes (gali), several of which are teeming with solicitous peddlers, street vendors, street food outlets, and bazaars.

=== Shops ===
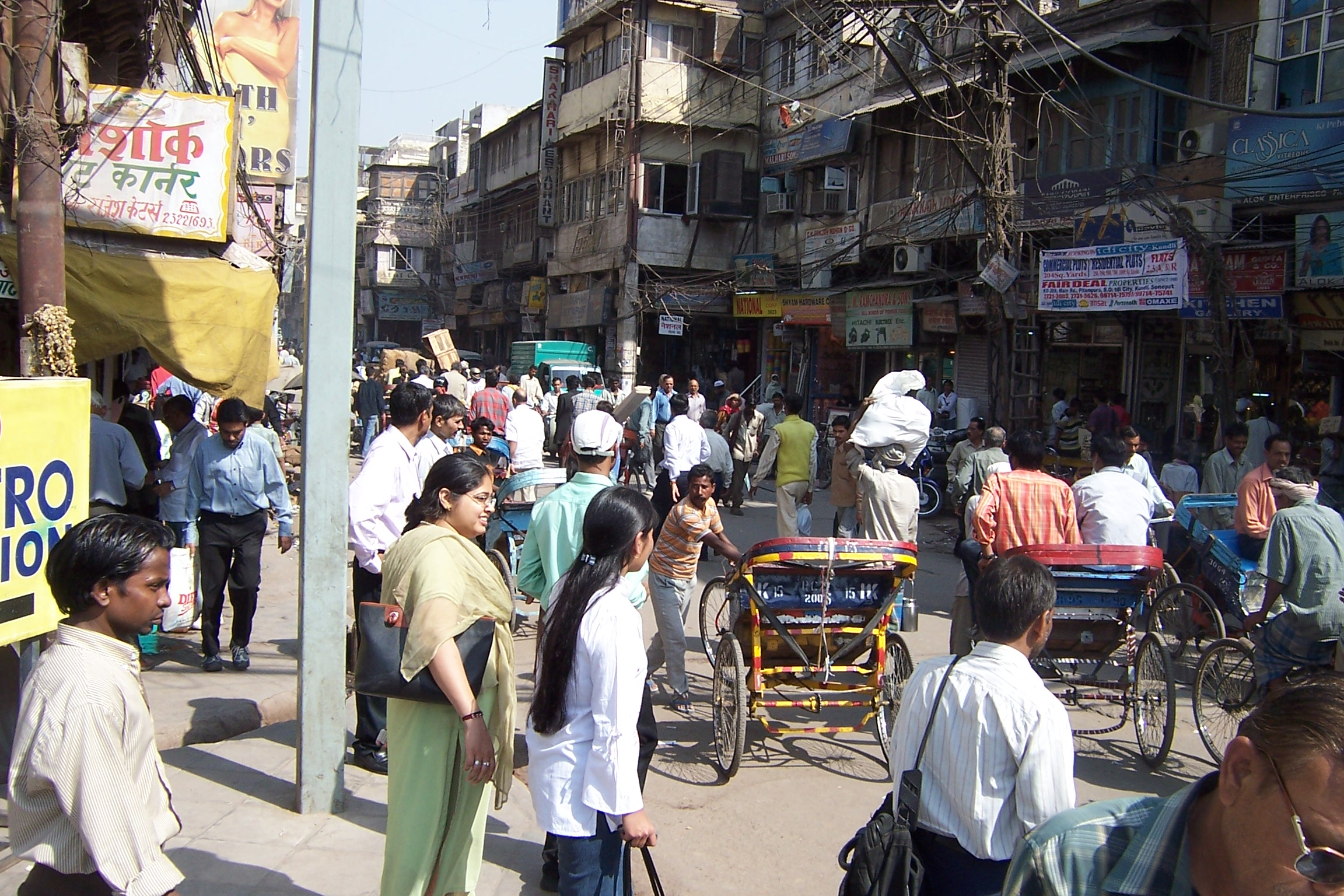
Chawri Bazar brimming with activity, circa 2006

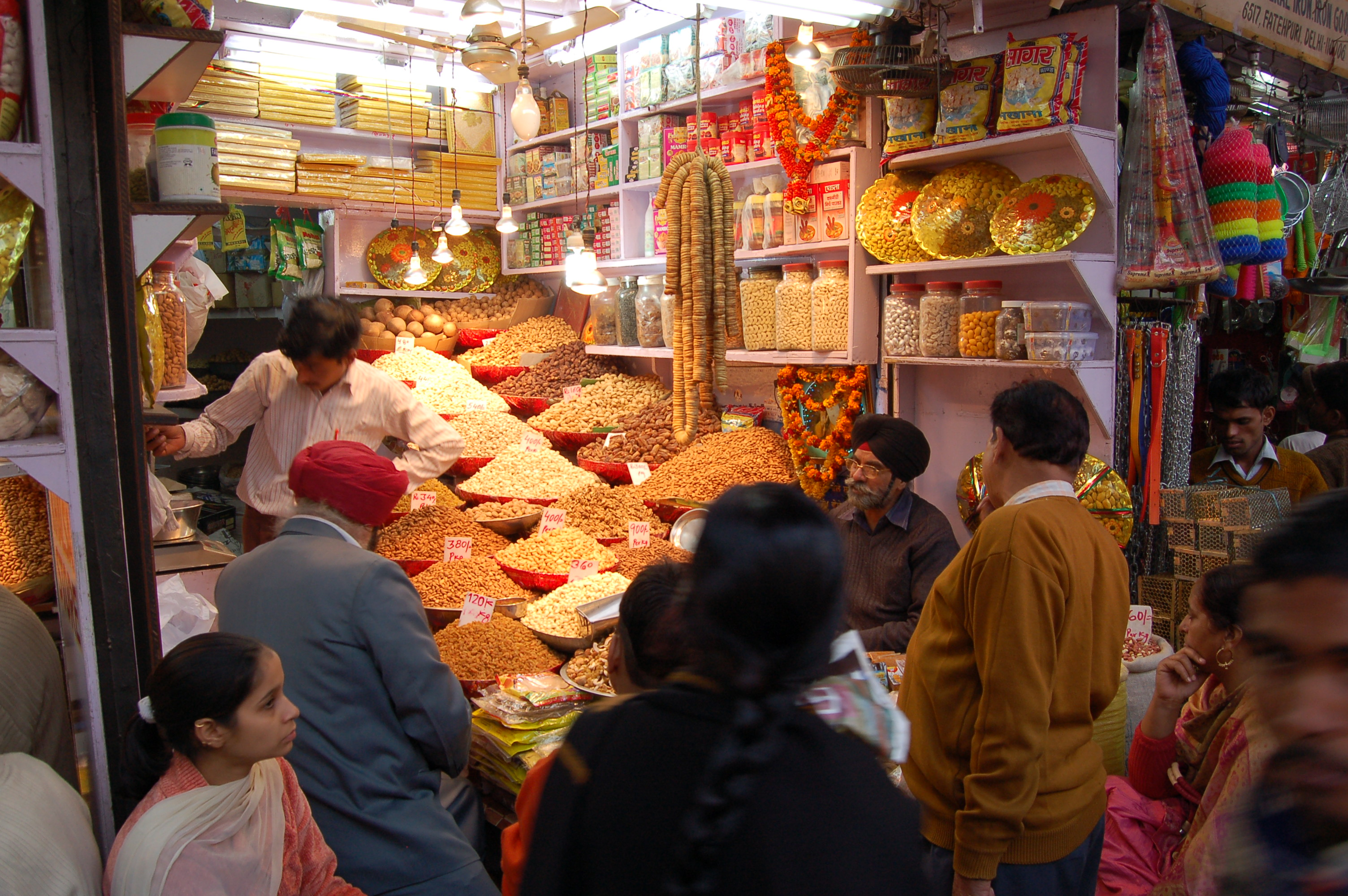
A food outlet on the Khari Baoli Road

Chandni Chowk's speciality is its variety and authenticity: food, delicacies and sweets of more than 1,000 kinds, and sarees weaved in the art of chikan and zari. Narrow lanes host shops that retail books, clothing, electronics, consumer goods, shoes and leather goods. It is the location of the original Haldiram's and brands such as Giani's. A particular local delicacy are jalebis, which are fried in pure ghee (clarified butter) and have a sticky constitution.

Embarking from the Red Fort in the east one finds the State Bank of India building as the spectator meanders eastwards. A short distance away is the Bhagirath Palace of Begum Samru which boasts of an intriguing history. While the Palace is currently owned by the Central Bank of India, which operates a branch from its premises, the Palace and the adjoining area host perhaps the largest market in India for electrical goods, lamps, and light fixtures. Dariba Kalan is a market for silver and gold jewellery. This market also offers trophies, shields, mementos, and other bespoke commemorative items.

At Chandni Chow's southern end (and close to the Jama Masjid, Delhi) is Bazaar Guliyan, where about a hundred shops selling metallic and wooden statues, sculptures, bells, handicrafts are located. Nai Sarak is the wholesale market for stationery, books, paper and decorative materials. Chawri Bazar is a large market for wedding cards, as well as plumbing fixtures, sanitary ware, and accessories. Located at the western end of Chandni Chowk, Khari Baoli, is a street entirely dedicated to an eclectic variety of spices, dried fruits, nuts, herbs, grains, lentils, pickles and preserves.

=== Restaurants and eateries ===
Chandni Chowk is home to several notable restaurants and halwais (confectioners), the foremost amongst them titled Gali Paranthe Wali.

- Paranthewali Gali with paratha businesses established between 1875 and 1886.
- Annapurna Bhandar, established in 1929 by Purna Chander Modak, is popular for Bengali sweets.
- Bikaner Sweet Shop, known for rasmalai.
- Chaatwallah, established in 1923, known for fruit chaat.
- Chaina Ram Sindhi Halwai, established in 1948, serves besan ke laddoo, ghee patisa, and ghevar like none in the city.
- Giani's, serving icecreams and rabri falooda, established around 1947.
- Gol Hatti, established in 1954, serves kullhad-wale chhole chawal (chickpea curry and rice served in earthenware).
- Hazari Lal Khurchan Wale, Kinaari Bazaar: this shop, established 90 years ago, arguably makes the best khurchan in Delhi. Khurchan means ”scraped leftovers" in Hindi. The preparation is rather elementary: boil the milk, scrape off the cream as it appears on the top, and eventually mix it with bhoora, or powdered sugar.
- Kanwarji's Bhagirathmal Dalbijiwallah, established in the mid-19th century.
- Meghraj and Sons, since the 1950s.
- Natraj's Dahi Bhalle, established in 1940.
- Shiv Mishtan Bhandar, established 1910, is popular for their bedmi pooree served with aloo sabzi and crisp jalebi or imarti. The menu, while limited, is popular with the inhabitants of the city.
- Tewari Brothers Confectioners, known for motichoor laddoos and samosas, established in 1987.
- The "Old Famous, Jalebi Wala", located in Dariba Kalan, serves crispy jalebis.

== Redevelopment ==
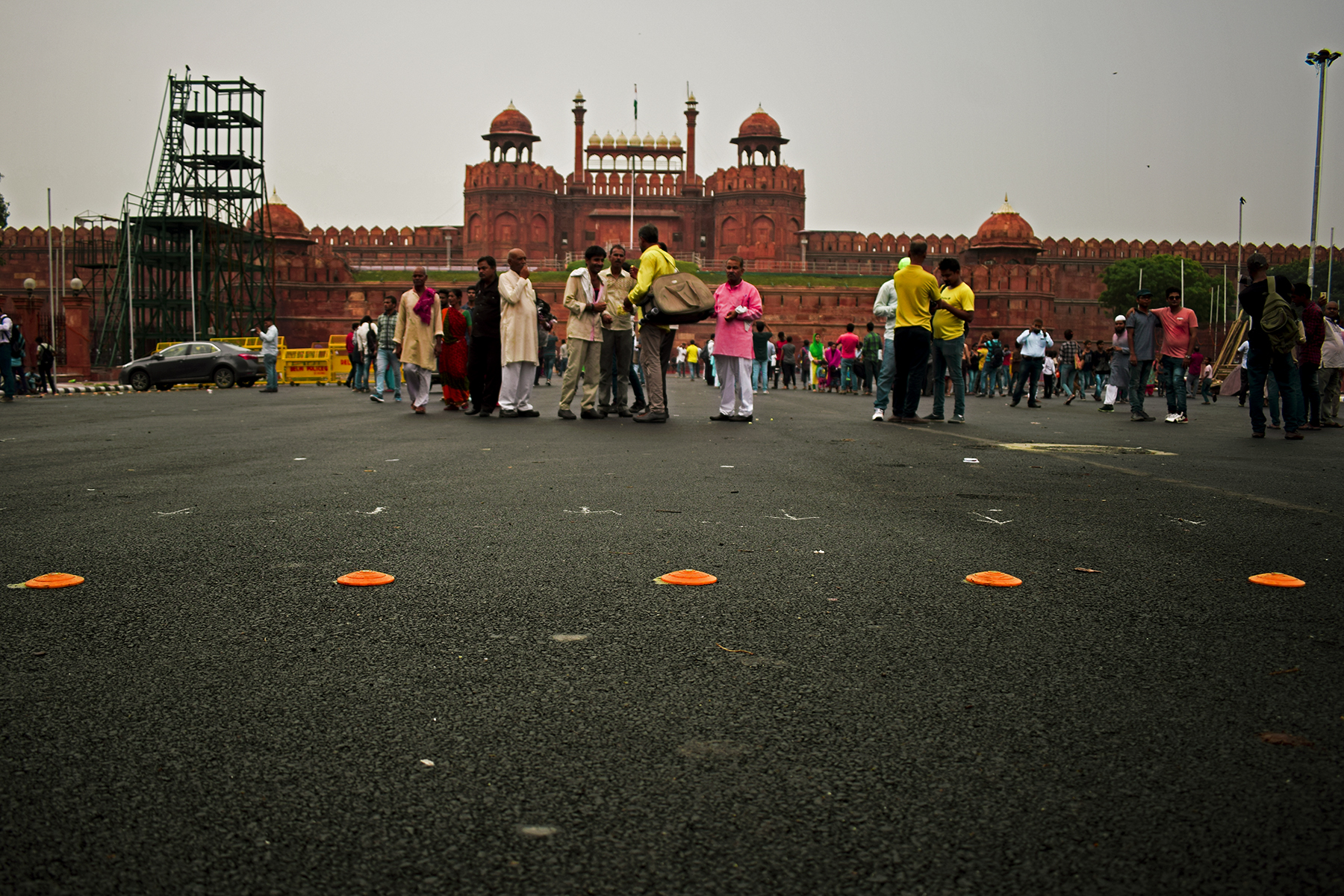
Chandni Chowk heritage walk starts from Red Fort

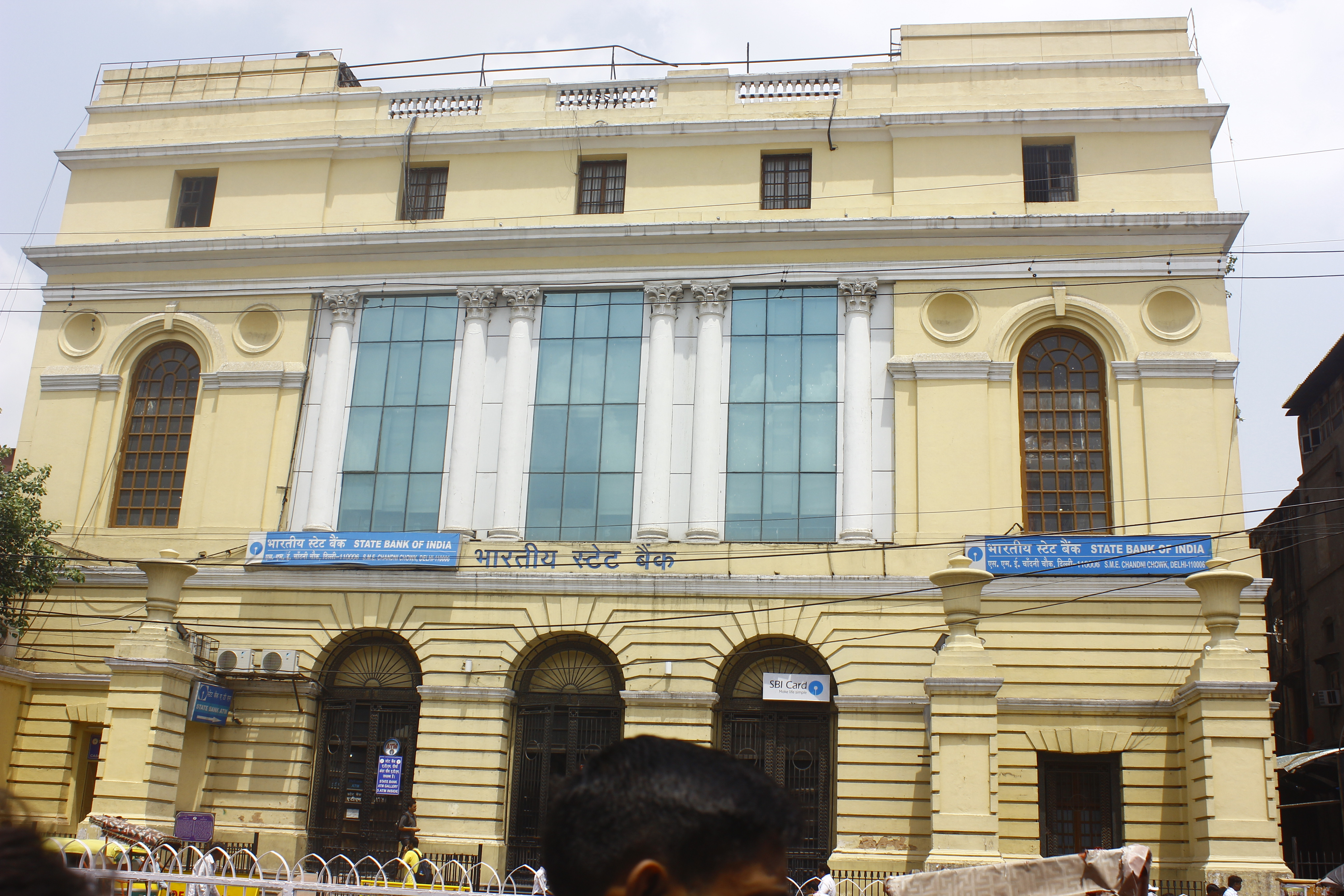
A branch of the State Bank of India in Chandni Chowk

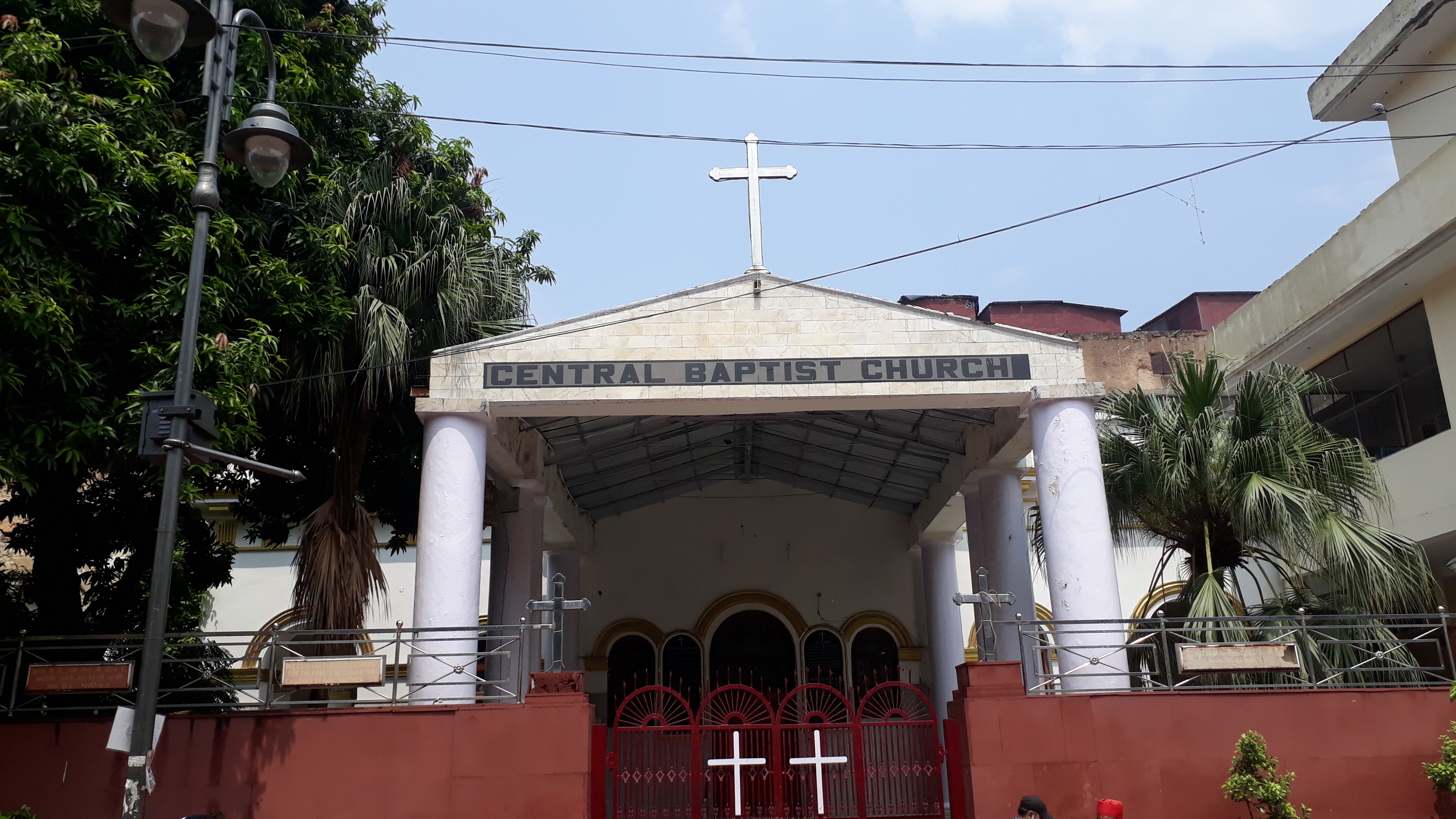
Central Baptist Church

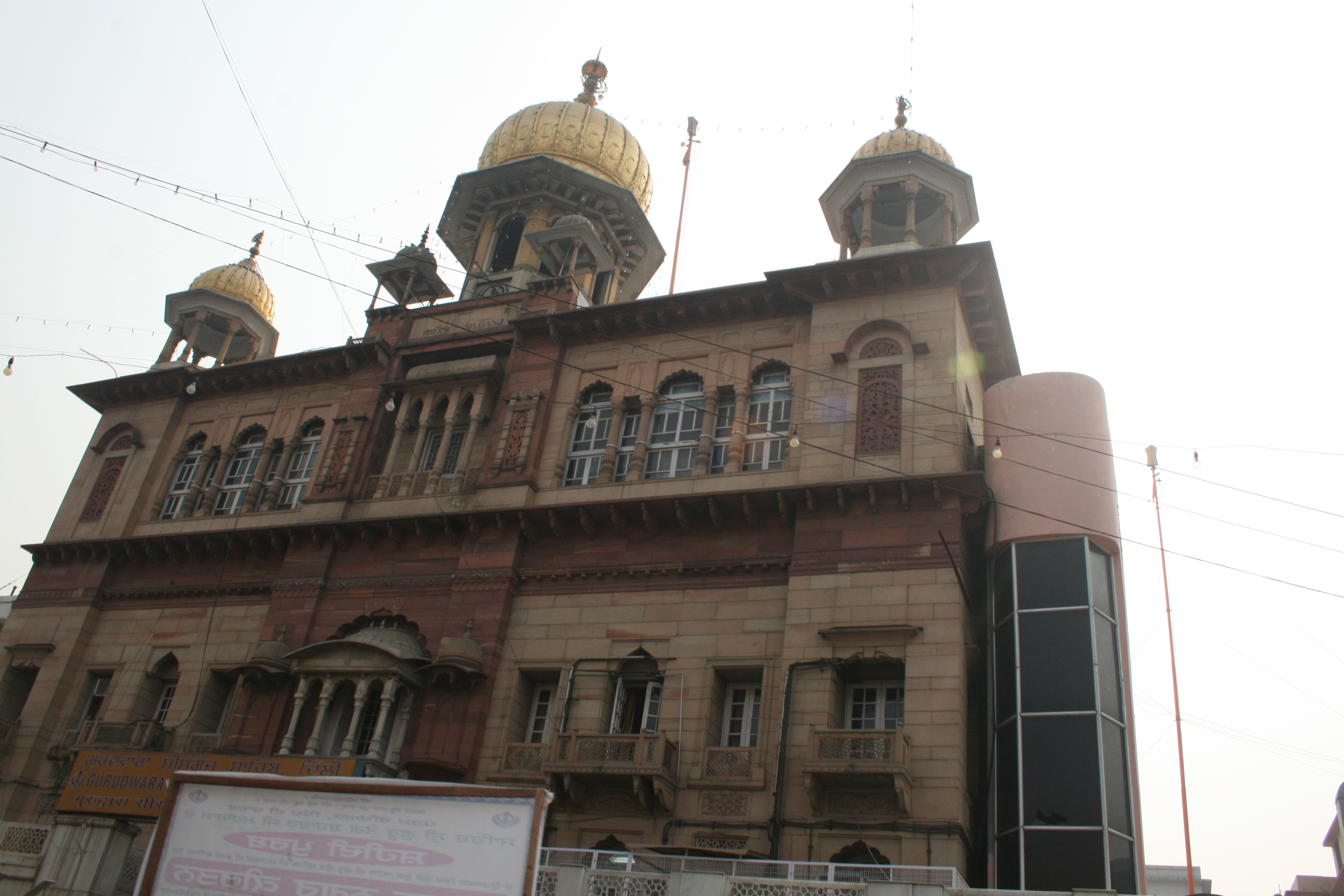
Gurudwara Sis Ganj Sahib

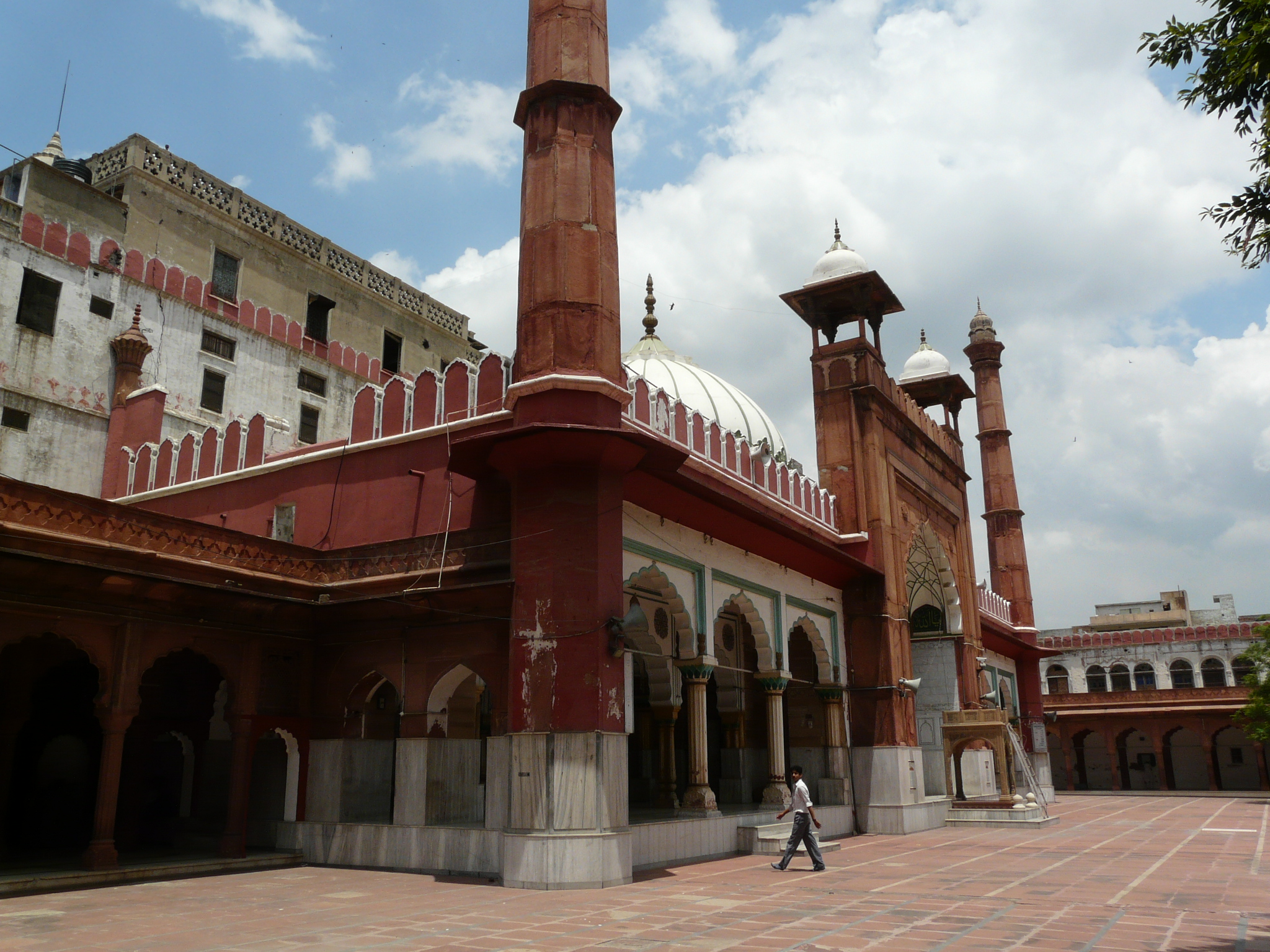
Fatehpuri Mosque, the end of the Heritage walk

Chandni Chowk underwent redevelopment as a heritage trail to stimulate tourism and restore its long-lost grandeur, seeking inspiration from the project revitalising the Heritage Street in Amritsar. The Shahjahanabad Redevelopment Corporation (SRDC), under the auspices of the Government of Delhi, is the agency entrusted with this ambitious task. The redevelopment plan included the incorporation of walkways to render the area to pedestrianise the area. No motorised traffic is allowed to ply on Chandni Chowk, from Red Fort in the east to Fatehpuri Masjid in the west, during daylight hours. Certain streets were barricaded. The redevelopment plan was supposed to conclude before the commencement of the 2010 Commonwealth Games, but inevitably faced delays. The first phase of the project did not finish until 2021. As a part of the redevelopment, a multilevel parking-cum-commercial complex was developed at Gandhi Maidan in Chandni Chowk. It was made operational in early 2024.

The wide boulevard was unearthed and redone, bedecked with red sandstones and granite pavings, similar to the ones constituting the Red Fort. The 1.3 kilometres-long stretch underwent substantial aesthetic transmogrification, with the objective of restoring its Mughal-era aesthetic considerations. This, however, did not adequately mitigate the severe congestion blighting the precinct. Absence of periodic maintenance and satisfactory enforcement of the foregoing traffic restrictions nullified the gains substantially.

The initiation of subsequent phases of redevelopment of the region, however, has witnessed protracted delays and stagnation. Under the Rekha Gupta-led BJP government in Delhi, elected to power in February 2025, only a single meeting of the SRDC has taken place, that too in February 2026 following her eventually assuming charge. Several ambitious proposals involving the critical modernisation of the precinct and its vicinity are in a limbo, partly attributed to the fact that the SRDC board had not convened and met once in the preceding three years. Notwithstanding the pendency of several critical proposals, Chief Minister Rekha Gupta, however, trained her sights on another matter during the meeting, announcing plans to rename the Shahjahanabad Redevelopment Corporation (SRDC) to Indraprastha Virasat Redevelopment Corporation, reflecting the BJP's fixation with erasing any traces of Mughal culture and heritage, and, consequently, the Indian Muslim identity as a whole. None of the outstanding redevelopment proposals were taken up for consideration during that meeting.

== Popular culture ==
Chandni Chowk has served as a prominent backdrop in several Bollywood films over the years:

- In 2001, Kabhi Khushi Kabhie Gham featured Chandni Chowk as the residence of leading characters Anjali (Kajol) and her sister Pooja (Kareena Kapoor).
- In 2008, Black & White, starring Anil Kapoor, Anurag Sinha, Shefali Chhaya, and Aditi Sharma, was set in Chandni Chowk.
- In 2009, Chandni Chowk to China, featuring Akshay Kumar, Deepika Padukone, Mithun Chakraborty, and Ranvir Shorey, included scenes depicting the area.
- In 2009, Delhi-6, starring Abhishek Bachchan, Sonam Kapoor, Waheeda Rehman, Om Puri, Atul Kulkarni, and Divya Dutta, was filmed in the Walled City of Old Delhi, with Chandni Chowk as its focus.
- In 2016, Saat Uchakkey, starring Manoj Bajpayee, Kay Kay Menon, Annu Kapoor, Vijay Raaz, Anupam Kher, Aparshakti Khurana, and Aditi Sharma, was entirely shot in and around Chandni Chowk.
- In 2018, Rajma Chawal, starring Amyra Dastur, Rishi Kapoor, and Aparshakti Khurana, had extensive sections filmed at Lachu Ram Ki Haveli in Chandni Chowk.
- In 2019, The Sky Is Pink, starring Priyanka Chopra, Farhan Akhtar, Zaira Wasim, and Rohit Suresh Saraf, was partially shot in Chandni Chowk, as the lead characters, played by Priyanka and Farhan, lived there.

== See also ==
- Dariba Kalan
- Gali paranthe walee
