= Inner Ring Road, Delhi =

Roadway in Delhi, India

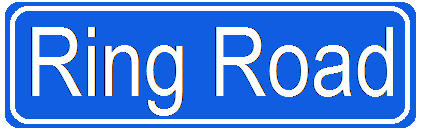
Ring Road's symbol – generally used in Delhi

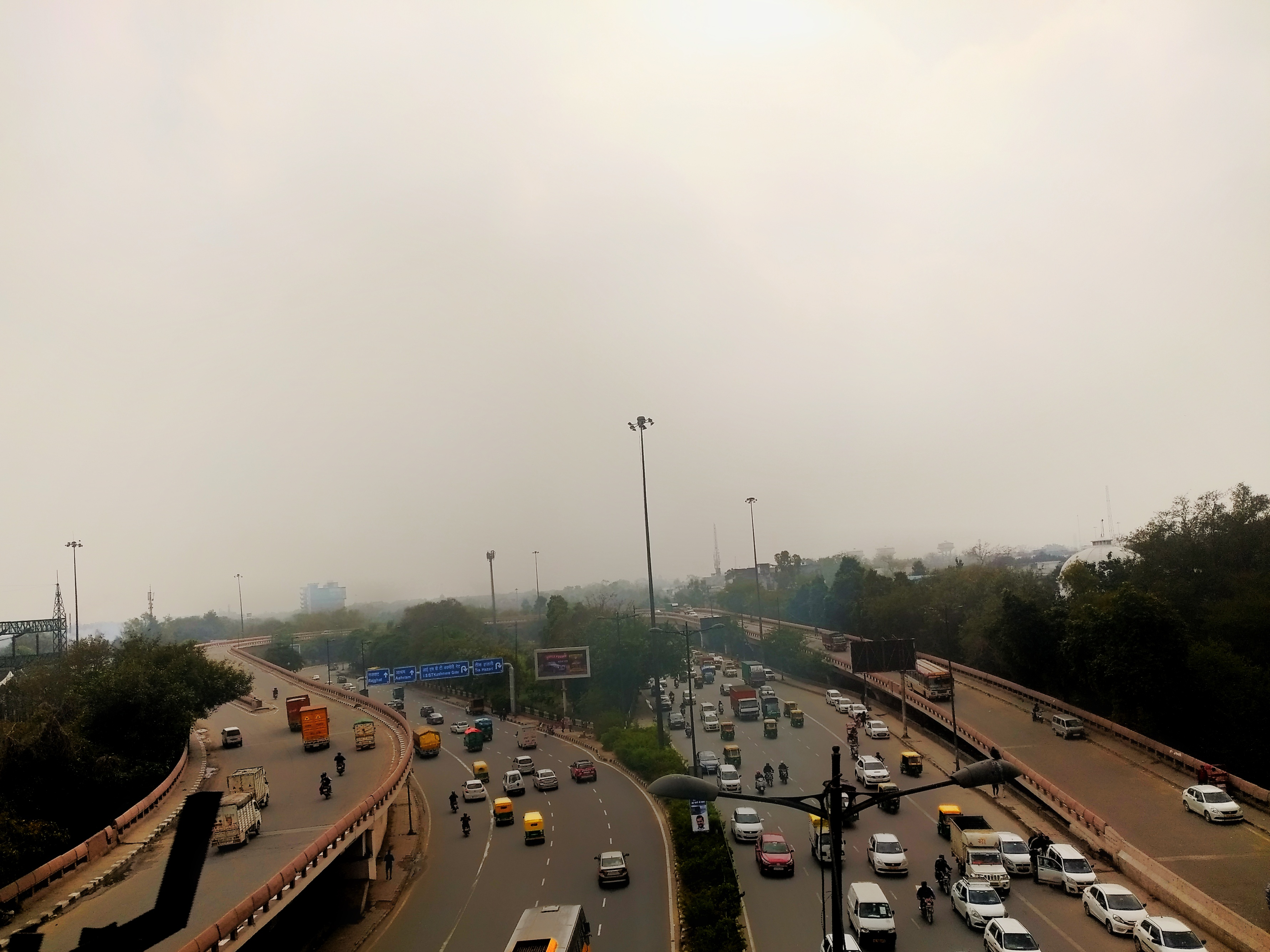
Delhi Inner Ring Road near Kashmere Gate ISBT

The Inner Ring Road, also called Mahatma-Gandhi Ring Road, refers to inner most among 3 main ring roads in Delhi in India, the inner, outer and UER-II. Delhi's Inner Ring Road covers 55 km (34 mi) and is signal-free except for a small number of crossings. The road features three lanes in each direction and is currently being widened to four lanes in each direction. It features a few flyover links to the Delhi Outer Ring Road.

== Route ==
List of places on Delhi Ring road in anti-clockwise direction is as follows:

- Shalimar Bagh
- Wazirpur Industrial Area, Ashok Vihar
- Keshav Puram
- Pitampura
- Shakurpur
- Punjabi Bagh
- Bali Nagar
- Raja Garden
- Ramesh Nagar
- Rajouri Garden
- Mansarovar Garden
- Mayapuri
- Naraina
- Delhi Cantonment
- Dhaula Kuan
- Delhi University South Campus
- Moti Bagh
- New Moti Bagh
- RK Puram
- Bhikaji Cama Place
- World Trade Centre
- Sarojini Nagar
- Safdarjung Enclave
- AIIMS Delhi
- Kidwai Nagar
- South Extension
- Andrews Ganj
- Lajpat Nagar
- Srinivaspuri
- Ashram
- Sunlight Colony
- Maharani Bagh
- Sarai Kale Khan
- Nizamuddin Railway station
- Millennium Park
- Pragati Maidan
- Indraprastha Estate
- ITO
- Raj Ghat
- Lal Qila
- Kashmere Gate
- Civil Lines
- Delhi University North campus
- GTB Nagar
- Model Town
- Azadpur

== Flyovers ==
Flyovers are present at the following junctions:

- Nizamuddin Xing Bridge
- NOIDA more/ NH24 T-Point Bridge
- Cloverleaves ITO flyover
- Old Hanuman Mandir / Iron Bridge/Old Delhi Xing/ Yamuna Bazar Bridge
- ISBT Kashmere Gate Flyover Complex
- Azadpur bridge
- Shalimar Bagh Flyover
- Wazirpur Bridge
- Prembari chowk Underpass
- Britannia Chowk Flyover
- Punjabi Bagh Flyover
- Moti Nagar Flyover
- Raja Garden/Shivaji Place District Centre Flyover
- Kirti Nagar/ Mayapuri flyover
- Rajput Samrat Anangpal Tanwar Setu Naraina Flyover
- Dhaula kuan
- Motibagh Flyover
- Africa Avenue Flyover
- Sarojini Nagar Flyover (over Shri Vinayaka Mandir Marg)
- AIIMS flyover Complex (over Sri Aurobindo Marg)
- South Extension/ August Kranti Marg/ Bhishm Pitamah Marg Xing
- Defence Colony Underpass below Moolchand Flyover
- Lajpat Nagar flyover
- Nehru Nagar Bridge
- Ashram-DND extension flyover

== Redevelopment plan ==
In November 2025, Delhi Government initiated a plan to redevelop and enhance the ring road to decongest the entire 55 km corridor. The 6 month long study and DPR will conclude in May 2026. INR7,000-8,000 cr plan also entails developing an elevated road corridor above the entire existing ring road.

== Gallery ==
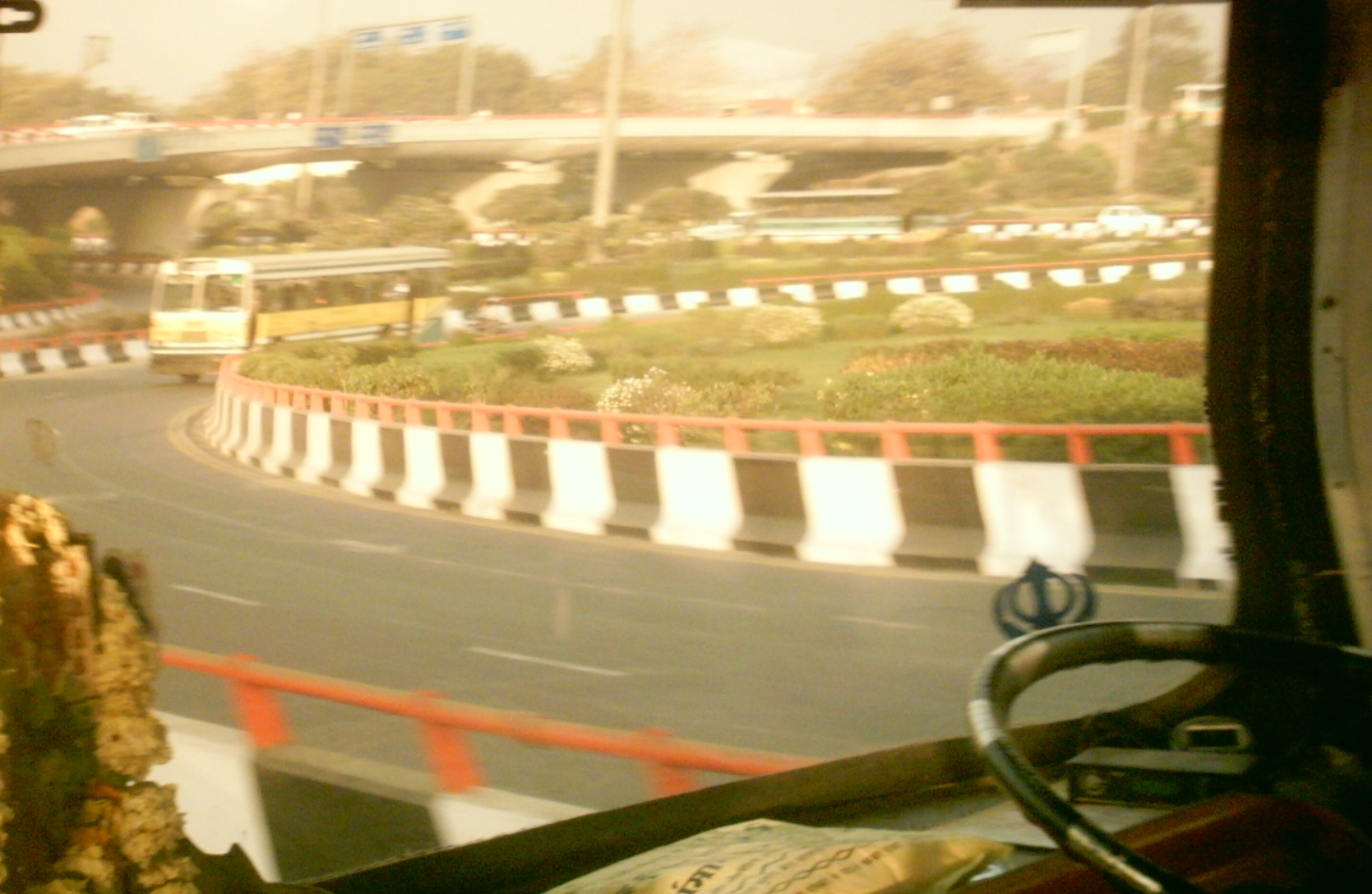
AIIMS flyover for Ring Road

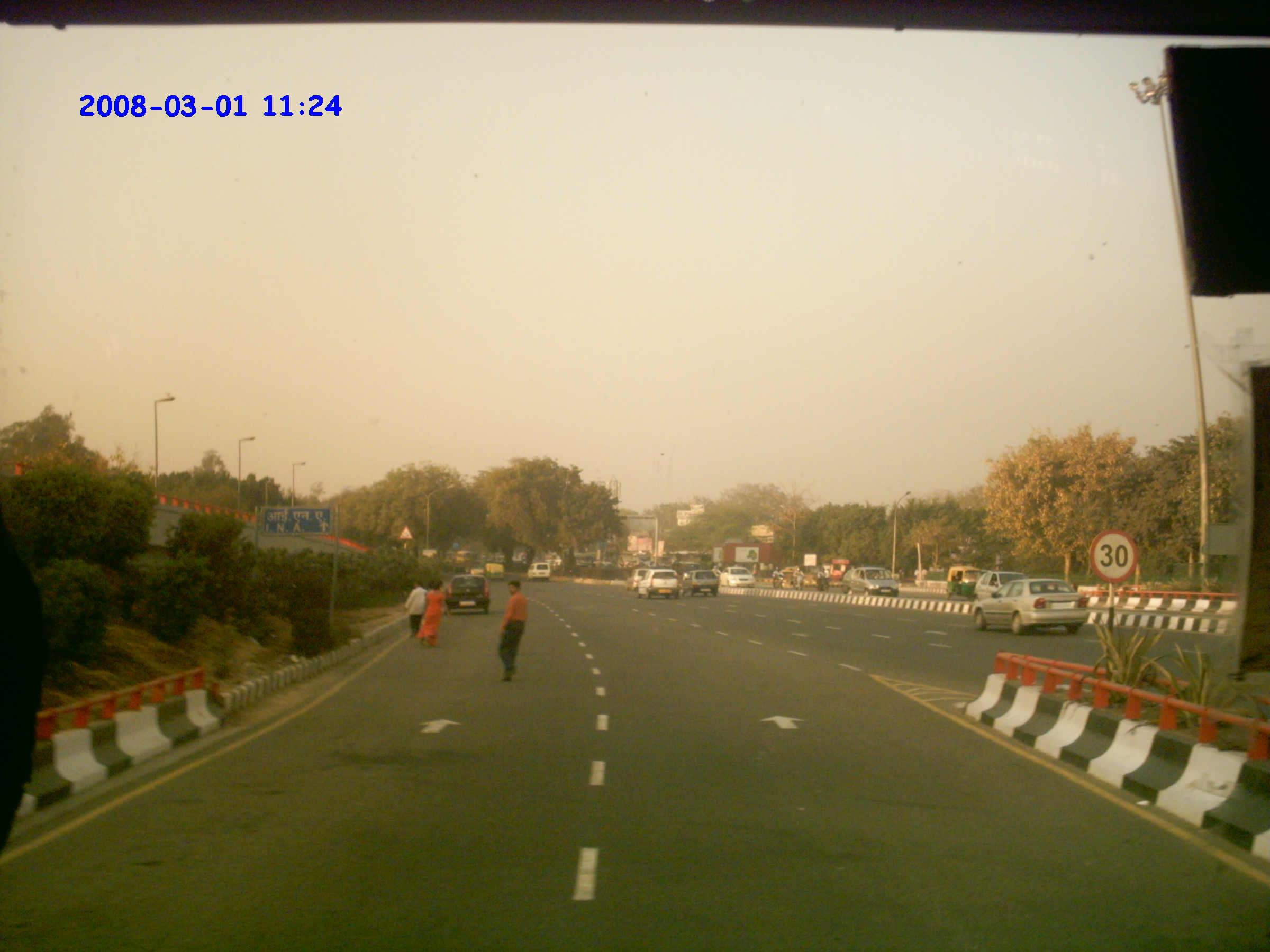
AIIMS flyover for Ring Road

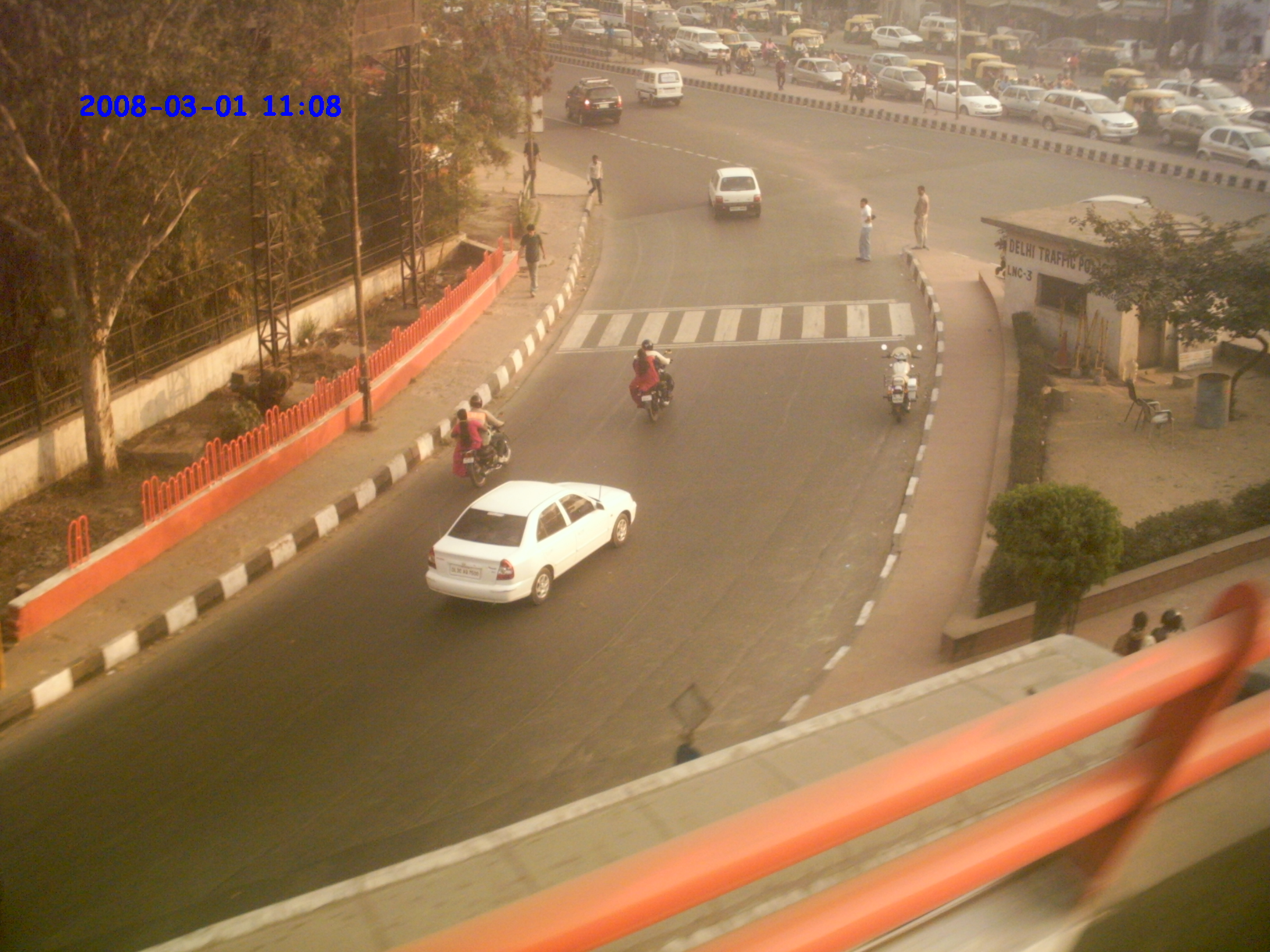
Ashram Flyover for Ring Road

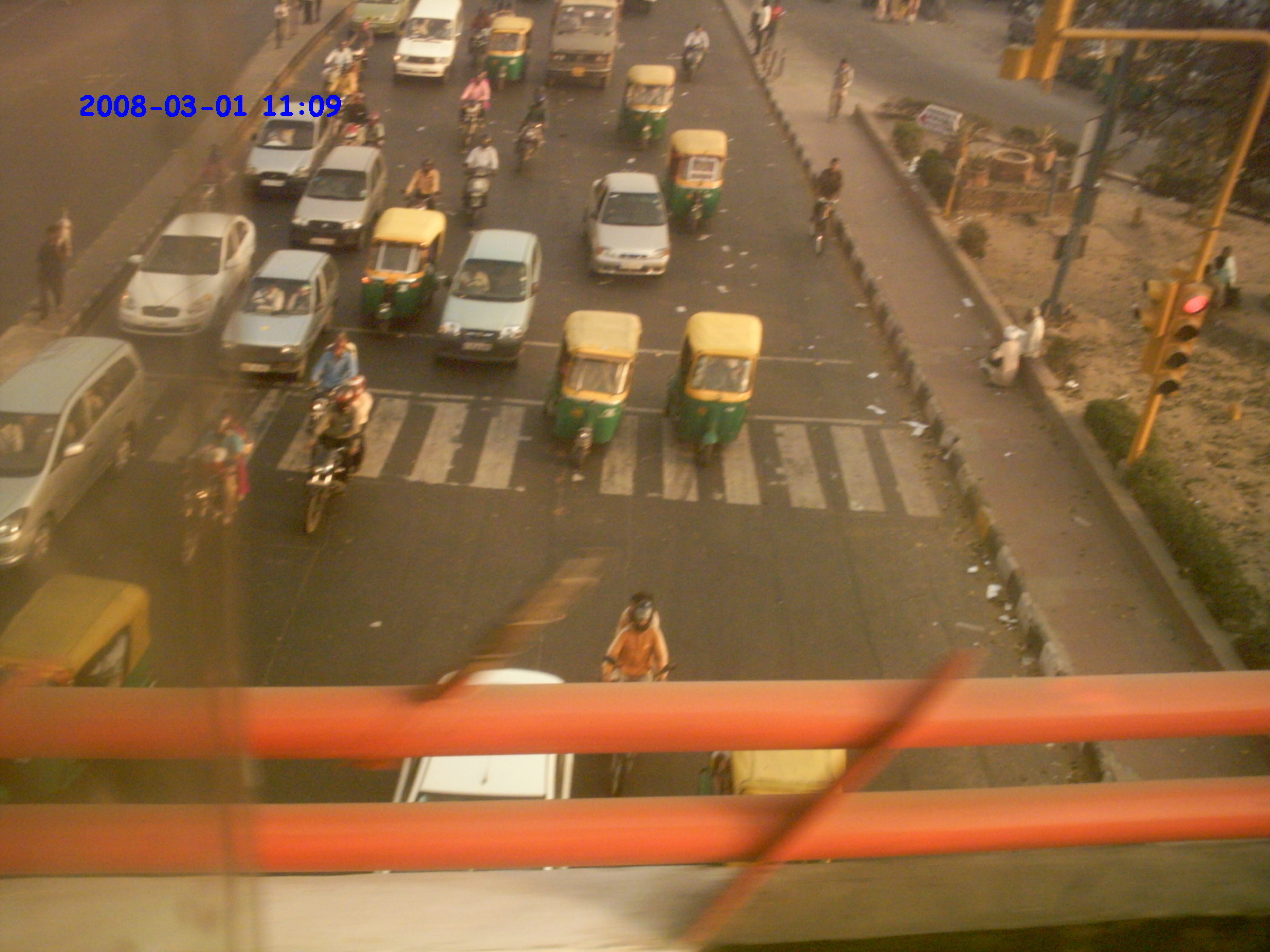
Ashram Flyover for Ring Road

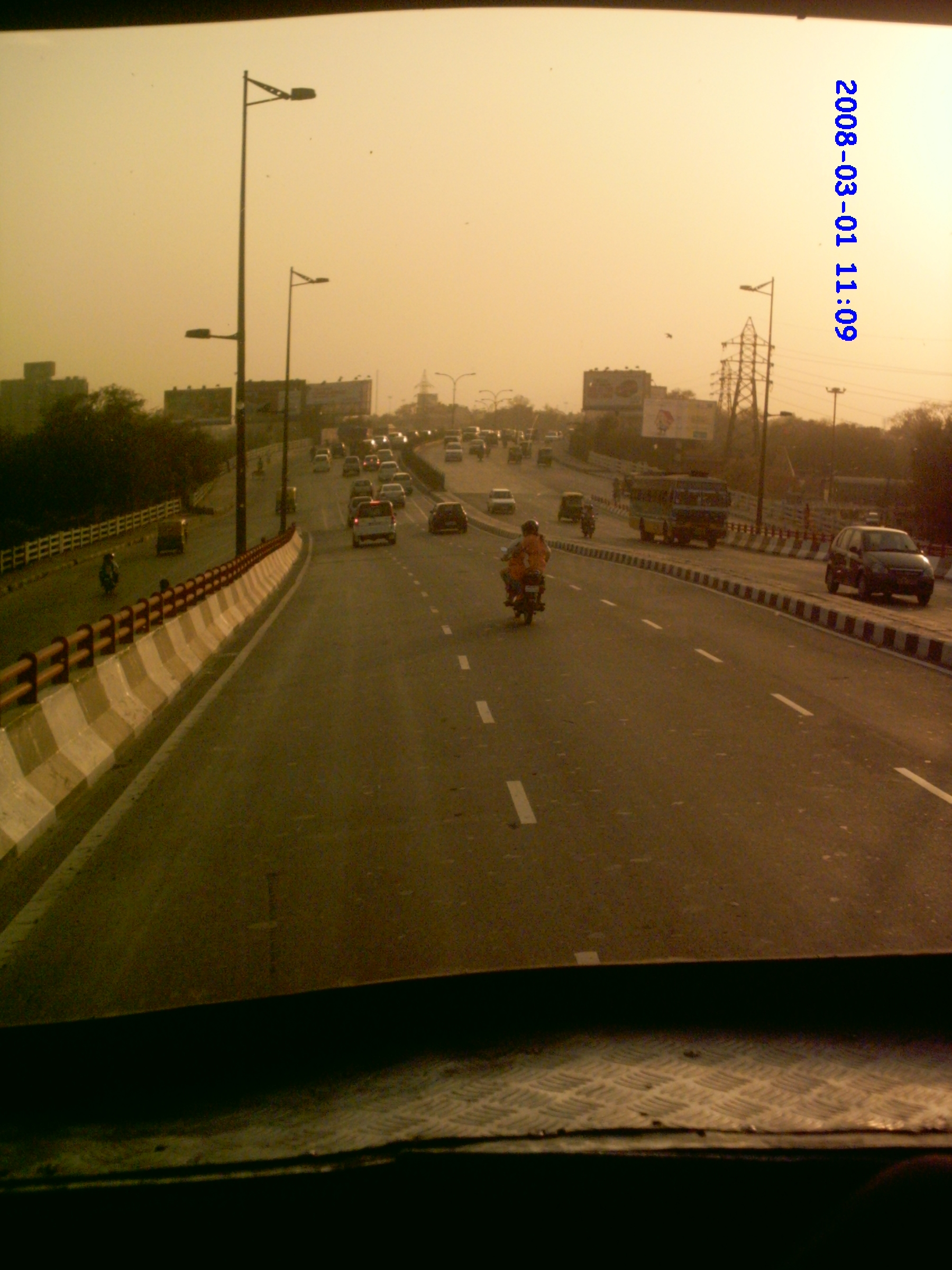
Ashram Flyover for Ring Road

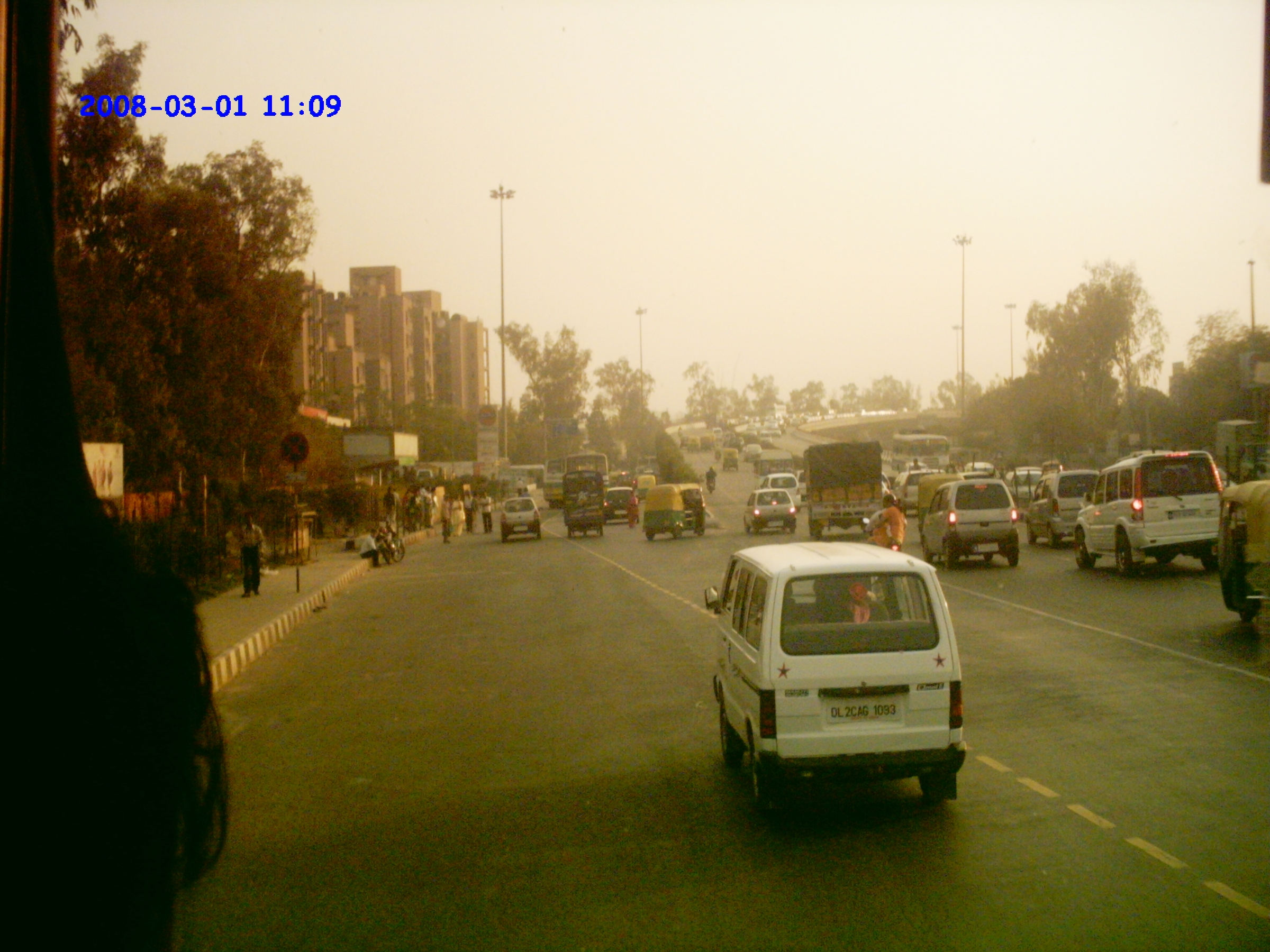
Ashram Flyover for Ring Road

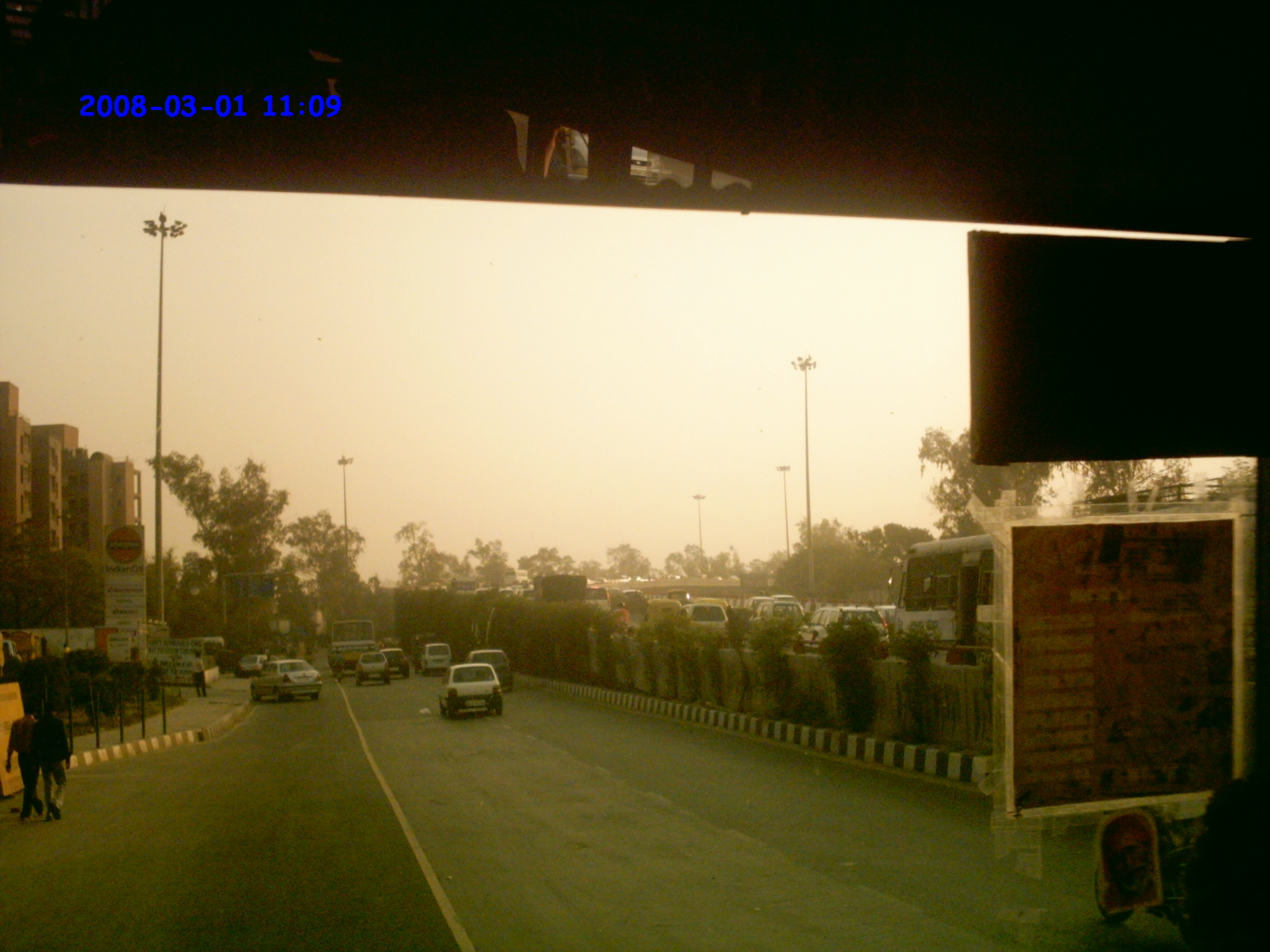
Ashram Flyover for Ring Road

== See also ==
- Circular roads around Delhi: Ring, Regional and Zonal Highways
  - Outer Ring Road, Delhi
  - Urban Extension Road-II
- List of expressways in India
  - Delhi–Amritsar–Katra Expressway
  - Delhi–Mumbai Expressway
  - Najafgarh Drain Highway

== See also ==
- Outer Ring Road, New Delhi
