= List of neighbourhoods of Delhi =

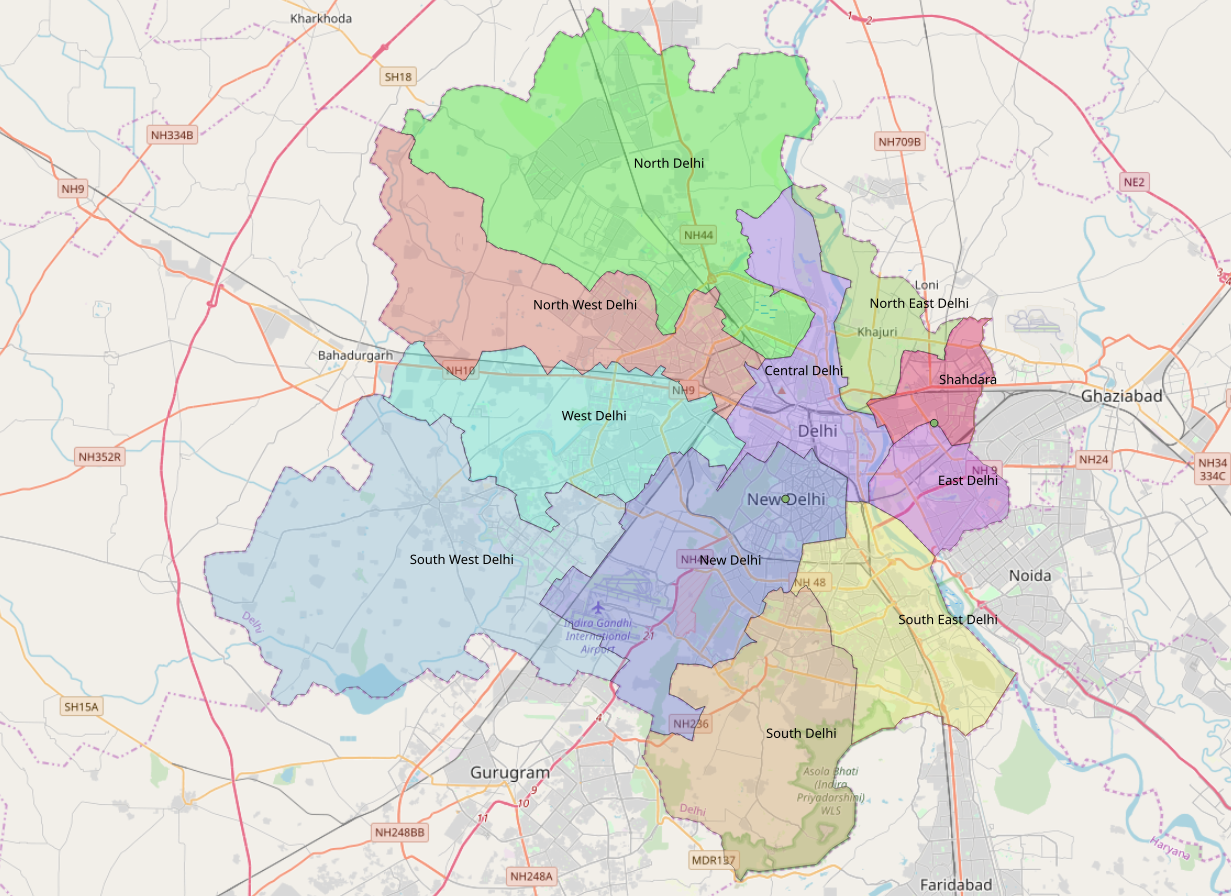
Districts of Delhi

Delhi, in the National Capital Region, is a vast city and a union territory and is home to a population of more than 23 million people. It is a microcosm of India, and its residents belong to varied ethnic, religious and linguistic groups. As the second-largest city and the capital of the nation, its 11 revenue or administrative districts comprise multiple neighbourhoods. The large expanse of the city comprises residential districts that range from poor to affluent and small and large commercial districts across its municipal extent.

This is a list of major neighbourhoods in the city and only pertains to the National Capital Territory of Delhi. It is not complete and outlines the various neighbourhoods based on the different districts of the metropolis.

== North West Delhi ==
- Rohini
- Pitam Pura
- Rani Bagh, Delhi
- Shalimar Bagh
- Keshav Puram
- Shastri Nagar
- Adarsh Nagar
- Ashok Vihar
- Bawana
- Begum Pur
- Haqiqat Nagar
- Karala

== North Delhi ==
- Civil Lines
- Model Town
- Kamla Nagar
- Gulabi Bagh
- Majnu-ka-tilla
- Shakti Nagar
- Azadpur
- Derawal Nagar
- Kashmiri Gate
- Daryaganj
- Narela
- Sadar Bazaar
- Sarai Rohilla
- Tis Hazari
- Timarpur
- Wazirabad
- GTB Nagar
- Mukherjee Nagar

== North East Delhi ==
- Naveen Shahdara
- Yamuna Vihar
- Shastri Park
- Nand Nagri
- Babarpur
- Bhajanpura
- Dayal Pur
- Karawal Nagar
- Jaffrabad, Delhi
- Shahdara
- Seelampur
- Gandhi Nagar

== Central Delhi ==
- Karol Bagh
- Chandni Chowk (Old Delhi)
- Rajendra Place
- Rajender Nagar
- South Patel Nagar
- Daryaganj
- Dariba Kalan
- Burari
- Sadar Bazaar, Delhi
- Paharganj

== New Delhi ==
- Lutyens' Delhi
- Pragati Maidan
- Barakhamba Road
- Raisina Hill
- Chanakyapuri
- Connaught Place
- Gole Market
- Khan Market
- Rama Krishna Puram
- Netaji Nagar, Delhi
- Vasant Vihar
- Moti Bagh
- New Moti Bagh
- Delhi Ridge
- Shankar Vihar
- Delhi Cantonment
- Vasant Kunj
- Golf Links, New Delhi
- INA Colony
- Inder Puri
- Laxmibai Nagar
- Sarojini Nagar
- Lodhi Colony
- Naraina
- Mahipalpur
- Mayapuri

== East Delhi ==
- Vasundhara Enclave
- East Vinod Nagar
- Krishna Nagar, Delhi
- Laxmi Nagar
- Mayur Vihar
- Pandav Nagar
- Preet Vihar
- Anand Vihar
- Shreshtha Vihar

== Shahdara ==
- Dilshad Garden
- Vivek Vihar
- Seemapuri

== South Delhi ==
- South Extension
- Hauz Khas
- Saket
- Green Park
- Gulmohar Park
- Khanpur
- Geetanjali Enclave
- Kailash Colony
- Malviya Nagar
- Maharani Bagh
- Mehrauli
- Munirka
- Safdarjung Enclave
- Netaji Nagar
- Pamposh Enclave
- Sainik Farm
- Sarvodaya Enclave
- Kalkaji
- Siri Fort
- Shahpur Jat
- Sriniwaspuri

== South East Delhi ==
- Greater Kailash
- Ashram Chowk
- Nehru Place
- Sarai Kale Khan
- Jangpura
- Defence Colony
- Lajpat Nagar
- Nizamuddin East
- Nizamuddin West
- New Friends Colony
- Chittaranjan Park
- Shaheen Bagh
- Govindpuri
- Okhla
- Sarita Vihar
- Sarai Kale Khan
- Tughlaqabad
- Badarpur
- Pul Pehladpur

== South West Delhi ==
- Dwarka Sub City
- Janakpuri
- Ber Sarai
- Dabri, Delhi
- Dashrath Puri
- Dhaula Kuan
- Ghitorni
- Munirka
- Najafgarh
- Palam
- Sagar Pur
- Jharoda Kalan
- Kazipur
- Chhawla

== West Delhi ==
- Shivaji Place
- Ashok Nagar
- Bali Nagar
- Fateh Nagar
- Kirti Nagar
- Meera Bagh
- Moti Nagar
- Nangloi Jat
- Paschim Vihar
- Patel Nagar
- Punjabi Bagh
- Rajouri Garden
- Shadipur Depot
- Shiv Ram Park
- Tihar Village
- Tilak Nagar
- Tikri Kalan
- Vikas Nagar
- Vikaspuri
- West Patel Nagar
- Uttam Nagar
- Nawada

== See also ==
- Districts of Delhi
