= Naveen =

- Pronunciation: English: /nəˈviːn/ nə-VEEN; Sanskrit: [nɐˈʋiːnɐ] Hindi: [nəˈʋiːn]
- Gender: Male
- Language: Sanskrit

Origin
- Origin: Indian
- Meaning: "new", "fresh", "young", "bright", "creative"

Other names
- Alternative spelling: Navin, Nawin, Nabin, Naween, Navheen, Nhaveen, Naven, Nabeen, Naveen

Naveen or Navin (Sanskrit: नवीन, IAST: navīna) is an Indian male given name and surname. The word means "new", "young", "bright", "creative". Naveen is chiefly used in Indian languages, and its origin is Sanskrit. It is derived from the element 'Navina' meaning new. The name 'Navina' is the female form of Naveen.

Navean, Naveane, Naveene, Navin (English and Indian), Navine, Navyn, and Navyne are variants of Naveen.

== Notable people ==
Notable people with that name include:

- Ampasayya Naveen (born 1941), Indian novelist
- Naveen Andrews (born 1969), British actor
- Naveen Asrani, Indian cricketer
- Navin Chawla (1945–2025), Indian civil servant and writer
- Naveen Jain (born 1959), American chief executive
- Naveen Jindal (born 1970), Indian politician
- Naveen John (born 1986), Indian racing cyclist
- Naveen Kumar (disambiguation), several people
- Naveen Naqvi, Pakistani journalist
- Naveen Patnaik (born 1946), Indian politician
- Naveen Polishetty (born 1989), Indian actor
- Naveen Soni, Indian journalist
- Vadde Naveen, Indian actor
- Naveen Waqar (born 1985), Pakistani VJ and model.
- Yalavarthi Naveen Babu (1964–2000), or simply Naveen, a Naxalite leader in India
- Naveen-ul-Haq (born 1999), Afghan cricketer

== Fictional characters ==
- Prince Naveen, a character in the 2009 Disney animated film The Princess and the Frog
- Naveen, a character in the 2025 videogame Pokémon Legends: Z-A

== See also ==
- Naveen Shahdara, residential area in North East Delhi
