= Ashok Vihar =

- Neighborhood
- Location in Delhi, India Ashok Vihar (India)
- Coordinates: 28.6856°N 77.1780°E
- Country: India
- State: Delhi
- District: North West Delhi
- Time zone: UTC+5:30 (IST)
- PIN: 110052
- Civic agency: MCD

Ashok Vihar is a neighbourhood in the North West Delhi district of Delhi, India. Situated along the Ring Road, Delhi, it is divided into four phases. It was built on the acquired lands of the Wazirpur village.

== Education ==
There are several schools in Ashok Vihar which include Mata Jai Kaur Public School, Prudence School, Kulachi Hansraj Model School, Montfort Senior Secondary School, DAV Public School, Lions Public School and Maharaja Agarsain Public School. Also, two colleges namely Satyawati College and Lakshmibai College, affiliated to University of Delhi, are located here.

== Hospitals and dispensaries ==
The main hospitals are Maharaja Agarsen Hospital, Jivodaya Hospital and Deep Chand Bandhu Government Hospital. An Ayurvedic dispensary has been set up by Government of Delhi. Also, C.G.H.S. dispensary is located here. Aam Aadmi polyclinic set up by the Delhi government is also located in the area. There are also a few private hospitals like Citizen Hospital, Nayati Sunderlal Jain Hospital and Dr. BD Attam Hospital and Medical Research Centre.

== Transport ==
Ashok Vihar is well connected through road and public transport. It has three Delhi Metro stations namely Keshav Puram, Kanhiya Nagar two of them situated on Red Line and Shalimar Bagh Metro Station on the Pink Line. Delhi Transport Corporation buses No 166 (Shalimar Bagh to Palika Kendra), 181(A) (Jahangir Puri to Nizzamudin Rly. Station), 142 (Jahangir Puri to I.S.B.T.) and 235 (Wazirpur J.J. Colony to Nand Nagri), in addition Metro feeder bus service between Inderlok Metro Station to Azad Pur Metro Station is also available.
