= Guraura =

Giraura is a village located Thirty miles from the center of Bulandshahar, Uttar Pradesh, India. It lies close to Noida International Airport; some of its fields touch the runways. It is about a mile and a half from Bulandshahar Road. Giraura has a Muslim Village.

== History ==
The village had been founded by a Pashun family in the 18th century after they received a grant of land from the Nawab of Awadh who ruled from his capital in nearby Lucknow. So, the original landowners were Muslim. However, after they backed the losing side in the Indian War of Independence in 1857, the British rewarded an Ahir family whose men had assisted them by giving them a large part of the lands. The Muslim family continued to live in Guraura but with diminished property. By the 1960s, the two landowning groups were led by Shri Krishan Yadav, known as "Babu", and two young men, brothers, Zahir and Saghir Khan.

In the 1960s, Guraura's people were largely of the Ahir caste (roughly 50%), followed by Muslims (25%) and Dalits of several castes (25%), mainly either Pasi or Kori. The state government had started a junior basic school there and the Block Development Program at Sarojini Nagar along Kanpur Road had begun to have some influence there. Most of the male inhabitants worked in agriculture, but many had jobs in Lucknow city, in the Railways or other organizations. Farmers in Guraura grew sugar cane, wheat, or various kinds of daal (gram, lentils). They kept some cattle or buffalo for milk and for work. Only a few families had enough land to make a good living. Women worked at home or sometimes in the fields, but never outside the village.

The government Panchayati Raj system had taken root in the village, but the villagers preferred to elect a sarpanch, while adhering to their traditional leaders. These leaders were to form an alliance in the 1960s which would bring enormous changes in the 1970s and 1980s.

== See also ==
- Bulandshahar
- Pathan

Village of Uttar Pradesh
