= Moti Bagh =

- Neighborhood of Delhi
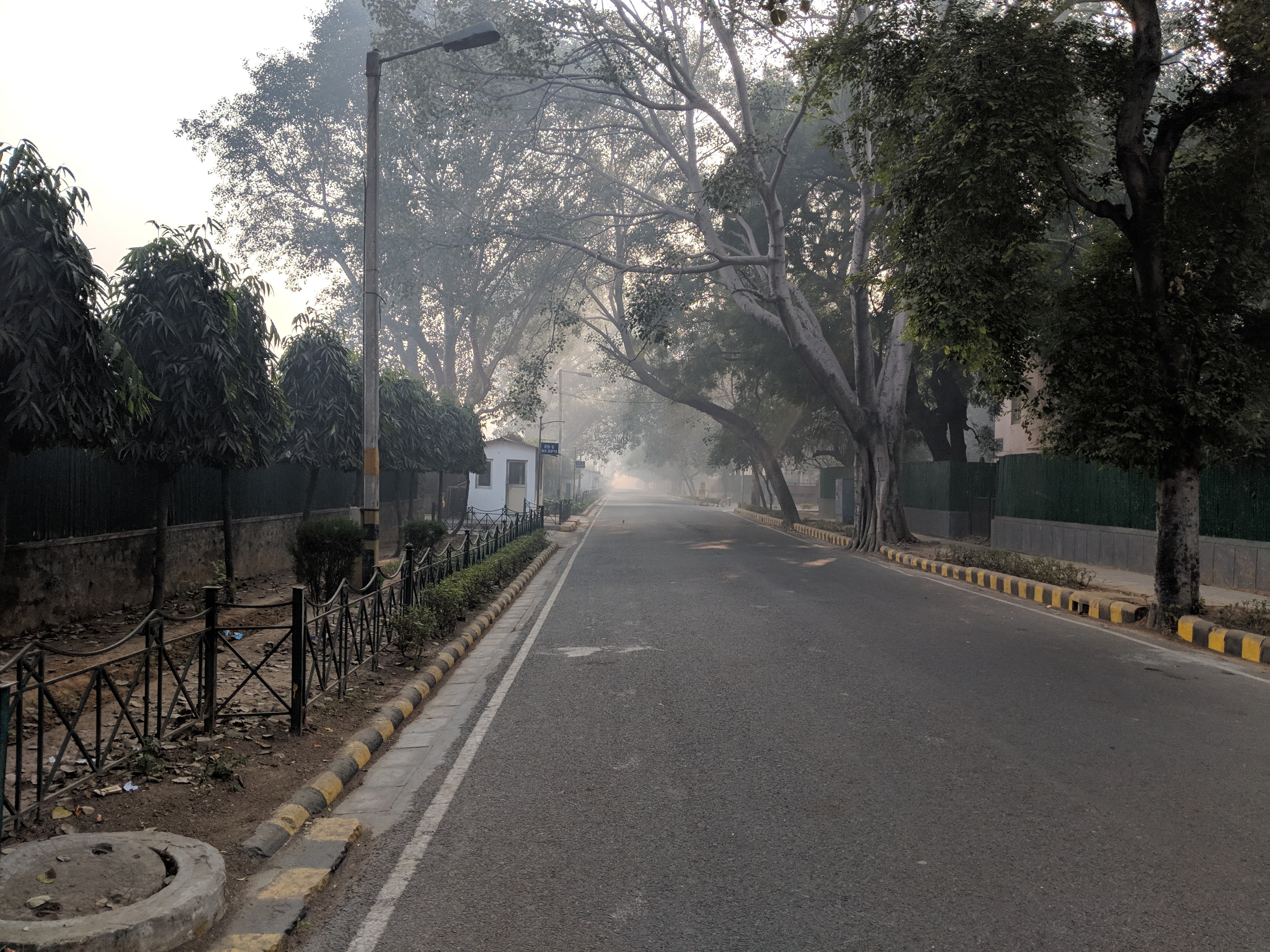
- Railway Board Houses, Moti Bagh

- Location in Delhi, India
- Coordinates: 28°35′N 77°11′E
- Country: India
- State: Delhi
- District: New Delhi

Government
  - Body: New Delhi Municipal Corporation

Languages
  - Official: Hindi, English
- Time zone: UTC+5:30 (IST)
- PIN: 110021
- Lok Sabha constituency: New Delhi
- Civic agency: New Delhi Municipal Corporation

Moti Bagh, a residential locality in New Delhi, was developed in 1950s to house Government employees. This locality, with many trees and parks, is divided into South Moti Bagh and North Moti Bagh.

Moti Bagh is the official residence to senior civil servants, members and Chairman of the Railway Board, other employees serving in the Government of India and several officers of the Indian Armed Forces, Particularly the Indian Navy and Army, primarily officers of the rank Brigadiers/Commodores and Major Generals.

2007 construction for New Moti Bagh started, and in 2012 ended. Satya Niketan is located to the south-west of Moti Bagh, and Shanti Niketan and Anand Niketan, two of the affluent localities of Delhi are located to the south of Moti Bagh.

== History ==
Situated south of Chanakyapuri, the colony has derived its name from a bagh (garden) and the area's name, which was Arakpur Bagh Mochi. Maulavi Zafar Hasan's Monuments of Delhi published in 1919, describes Moti Bagh as: "The Bagh is an extensive enclosure surrounded by a masonry wall with a bastion at each of the four corners and a big gateway towards east. in the centre of the enclosure there is a tank about 120 sq. feet with a circular bastion, which has a pavilion of three compartments on its northern bank. it was originally a bagh built by one Ramdas entitled Mochi and it is after his title that the garden is known". At the turn of the century, the area became known as Mochi Bagh rather than the Arakpur Bagh Mochi.

The name ‘Mochi Bagh’ remained on paper. After India's independence, the land acquisition process to build accommodations for the employees of the Central Government began. Once completed, the name Mochi Bagh sounded a tad too coarse for a high-end government accommodation, so the babudom quietly changed it to 'Moti Bagh'," says RV Smith, a prominent historian. "Till the early 1950s, it was all agricultural land and a few houses. The people who were well off left the area to buy kothis elsewhere," said Ashok Tanwer, resident of Fatehpur Beri. Ironically, what remains of Arakpur Bagh Mochi is an unauthorised cluster awaiting regularisation.

== Overview ==
It is easily accessible from Health centres like AIIMS and Indira Gandhi International Airport, one of India's most significant and busiest airports. Nanak Pura Gurudwara is also located very near to Moti Bagh. The nearest working metro station is the Dhaula Kuan metro station. The Moti Bagh metro station is under construction and on the Pink Line of the Delhi Metro.

The northwest Moti Bagh colony has two main markets, Begum Zaidi Market and Basrurkar Market. There is one hospital and a CGHS dispensary near Begum Zaidi Market. There are eight schools, 5 of them are in North Moti bagh; a primary co-ed school, two Sarvodaya Vidyalays; boys and girls school, and two run by NDMC (New Delhi Municipal Corporation); NP Co-ed senior secondary school and Navyug School while 3 of them are on South Moti bagh; Sarvodaya Vidyalaya separate for boys and girls, and Delhi Tamil Education Association (DTEA) Sr. Secondary School. The National Rail Museum, New Delhi is nearby. The historic 'Gurudwara Moti Bagh Sahib' was built in 1783 by Sikh military general Baghel Singh, along with other noted gurudwaras like Gurdwara Rakab Ganj Sahib and Bangla Sahib.

North West Moti Bagh has high-rise and multi-storey apartments.

Moti Bagh has Type 2, Type 3, Type 4, D-II (B and C blocks) and C-II and C-I houses.

== Education ==
A District Institute of Education and Training (DIET) of SCERT for South Delhi zone is also situated here, apart from the South Study Centre of School of Open Learning at South Moti Bagh, New Delhi. Delhi University colleges like Sri Venkateswara College, Atma Ram Sanatan college and Ram Lal Anand college are situated nearby.

== Notable residents ==
- Raghuram Rajan
- Mukund Rajan
