= Delhi College of Arts and Commerce =

Constituent college of the University of Delhi in India

Delhi College of Arts & Commerce
- Type: Government
- Established: 1987
- Affiliations: University of Delhi
- Location: University of Delhi, Netaji Nagar, New Delhi, Delhi, India
- Campus: Urban
- Website: dcac.du.ac.in

Delhi College of Arts and Commerce is a constituent college of the University of Delhi, in New Delhi, India. The college presently operates in a building owned by the Department of Higher Education, GNCTD. situated at Netaji Nagar, New Delhi. A premier constituent under the University of Delhi, is partially Govt. of NCT, Delhi financed.

== History ==
The college was established in 1987 under the aegis of Delhi administration when the G.D. Salwan College closed its operation. Though it is now an entity independent of the Salwan Trust, yet in its formative years, it transformed out of the G.D. Salwan College that was located in Rajinder Nagar. The college presently operates in a building owned by the Department of Higher Education. It was also the pioneer college in Delhi University to introduce a three year honours program in journalism in July–August 1989.

== Campus ==
Delhi College of Arts and Commerce has a campus area of approximately 5 acres, with a built up area of around 2.5 acres. It is situated in Netaji Nagar, with various prominent residential societies and commercial ventures in its proximate neighborhood. It is well connected by the Delhi Metro, the nearest stations being INA and Bhikaji Cama Place, as well as by road transport, through both bus routes as well as auto rickshaws/ e-rickshaws from the nearest Metro/ bus station. With the newly constructed Sarojni Metro station commuting to college has been further eased. Leela Palace is a nearby landmark.

== Academics ==
=== Academic programs ===
The college offers 18 undergraduate courses leading to a bachelor's degree with honours /program degree with various paper options for students to choose from both under the CBCS (Choice Based Credit System) mode and the semester/ FYUP (Four Year Undergraduate Programme) mode. The college also offers various add on and self-financed courses. Until 2013, the college, in collaboration with ILLL (The Institute of Life Long Learning), also offered an add on English Language Proficiency Course, Basic Level to give students practice in using English in a wide variety of contexts relevant to work, study and social activities. Besides this, in 2015, the college also collaborated with National Skill Development Corporation, which has since been supplemented with the Pradhan Mantri Kaushal Vikas Yojana Scheme. The college has also been making various efforts and initiatives to integrate cross cutting issues as gender, climate change, environmental education, human rights, ICT (Information and Computer Technology) through various cells, societies and community outreach programs.

=== Ranking ===
In 2020, Delhi College of Arts and Commerce was ranked 26th among commerce colleges and 31st among arts colleges in India by India Today.

University rankings

General – India
- NIRF (Colleges) (2024): 97

In 2024, the college was ranked 97th amongst the top 100 colleges list released by the NIRF (National Institutional Ranking Framework).

=== Admission ===
The centralized application form for Delhi University is required and then respective cut-offs for the different courses which are offered by the college have to be met.

== Student life ==
The college hosts an annual cultural fest called Ambrosia (Now Panghat). The various other departments and societies of the college host their fests with pomp and show. There is a Paying Guest area for students from outstation at the back side of college and further more they can stay up in flats in Satya Niketan. The college holds a good record of scholars and also the societies have already made their name in the competitions with at central level.

== Noted people ==
The notable alumni of Delhi College of Arts and Commerce include:

- Rahul Verma, social worker and activist who founded the Uday Foundation
- Nalin Mehta, senior journalist and former managing editor of Headlines Today
- Rahul Kanwal, senior journalist of TV Today Networks
- Wasim Mushtaq Indian Television Actor & Singer
- Cyrus Sahukar, VJ and Bollywood actor
- Rekha Rana, Bollywood actress and theatre artist
- Vinil Mathew, ad filmmaker and Bollywood film director
- Gursimran Khamba, comedian.
- Gautam Rode Indian Television Actor

Karan veer Mehra Bollywood and Television Actor
