= Shiv Ram Park =

- Neighborhood of Delhi
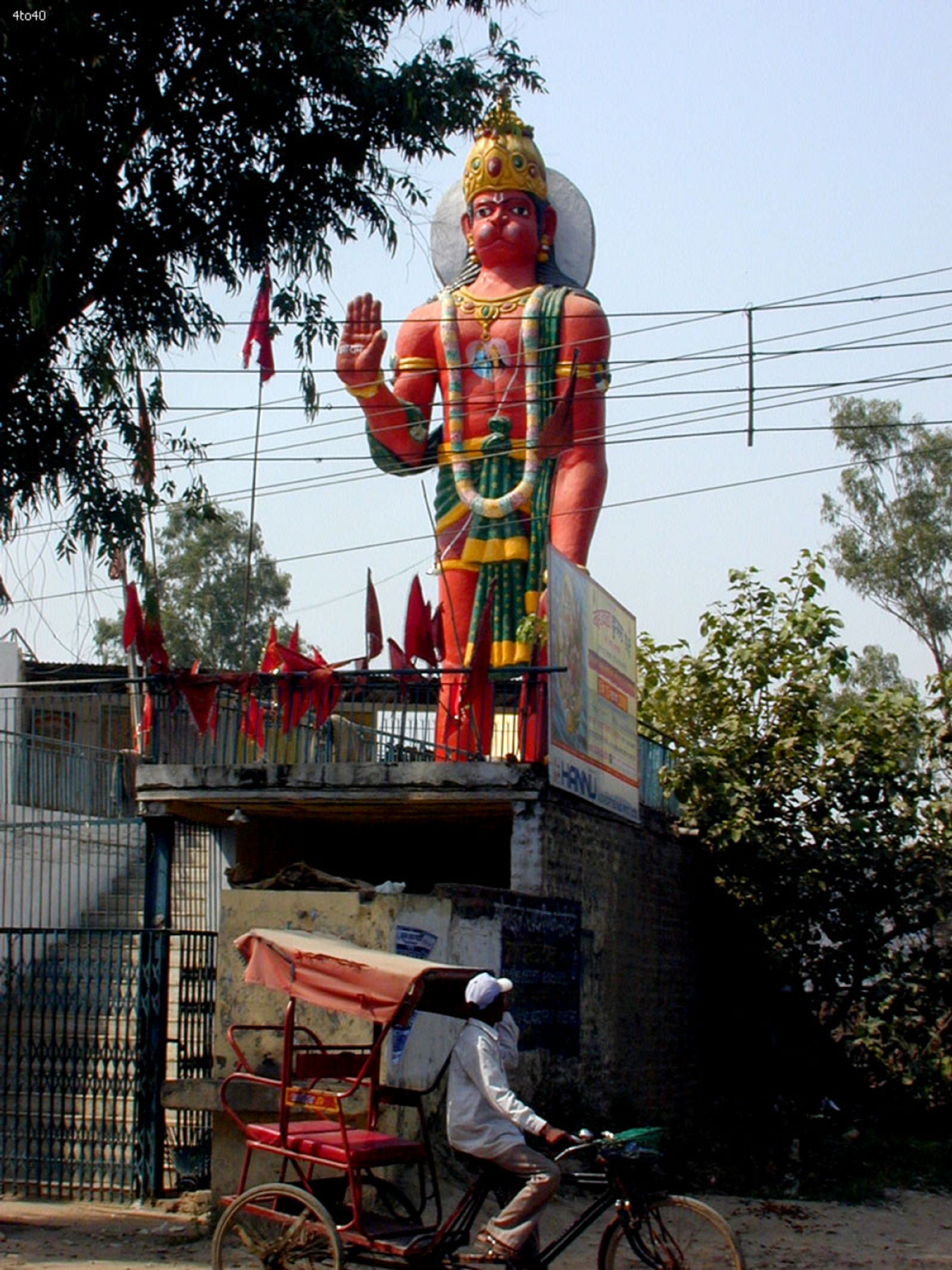
- Country: India
- State: Delhi
- District: West Delhi

Languages
  - Official: Hindi
- Time zone: UTC+5:30 (IST)
- Planning agency: MCD

Shiv Ram Park is a residential area situated on Najafgarh Road in West Delhi area of Nilothi-Nangloi. It is about 2.5 km from Nangloi Metro Station. Nearby areas include Kunwar Singh Nagar, Adhyapak Nagar, Lakshmi Park, Nihal Vihar, Nilothi More, and Rishal Garden.

Shiv Ram Park is under Nangloi assembly (11) MLA Raghvendra Shaukeen (current) From AAP. & North West Delhi MP Hansraj Hans (Current)

Shiv Ram Park also have one Delhi Govt. School located in Nilothi mode Road, This School is only for girls.

== Transport ==
Shiv ram park also have DTC Bus Service Route No 905 & 907 towards Nilothi Mode. Shiv ram park also other Bus Service by Nilothi Crossing Bus Stop. Route No LT, 539, 701, 708, 923, 931, 942, 963, 968, 978 & 998
