= NBCC (India) Limited =

Central Public Sector Undertaking

- Type: Central Public Sector Undertaking
- Traded as: BSE: 534309; NSE: NBCC
- Founded: New Delhi, India
- Key people: K. P. M. Swamy (Chairman & MD)
- Revenue: ▲₹13,195.89 crore (US$1.4 billion) (2026)
- Operating income: ▲₹622 crore (US$65 million) (2026)
- Net income: ▲₹720.3 crore (US$75 million) (2026)
- Total assets: ▲₹16,274 crore (US$1.7 billion) (2026)
- Total equity: ▲₹2,670 crore (US$280 million) (2026)
- Owner: Ministry of Housing and Urban Affairs, Government of India
- Number of employees: 2,024 (2025)
- Subsidiaries: Hindustan Steelworks Construction Limited
- Website: www.nbccindia.in

NBCC (India) Limited is a public sector undertaking under the Ministry of Housing and Urban Affairs, Government of India.

The central public sector undertakings' present areas of operations are categorised into three main segments; (i) project management consultancy (PMC), including redevelopment of government properties, (ii) engineering, procurement and construction (EPC) and (iii) real estate development.

NBCC is headquartered in the city of Delhi, India and it has 35 regional offices across India. The projects undertaken by the company are located across India and in other countries such as Iraq, Libya, Nepal, Mauritius, Turkey, Botswana, Maldives, Yemen, Oman, UAE.It has executed several landmark projects that include re-development of government properties, construction of roads, railway stations, hospitals and medical colleges, institutions, offices, bridges, and industrial & environmental structures.

NBCC is designated as the implementing agency for executing projects under the Atal Mission for Rejuvenation and Urban Transformation (AMRUT), Pradhan Mantri Gram Sadak Yojna (PMGSY), Solid Waste Management (SWM) and developmental work in North Eastern Region.

A number of Central Government ministries and various state governments have been utilizing the services of NBCC as their extended engineering arm.

== Functional setup ==
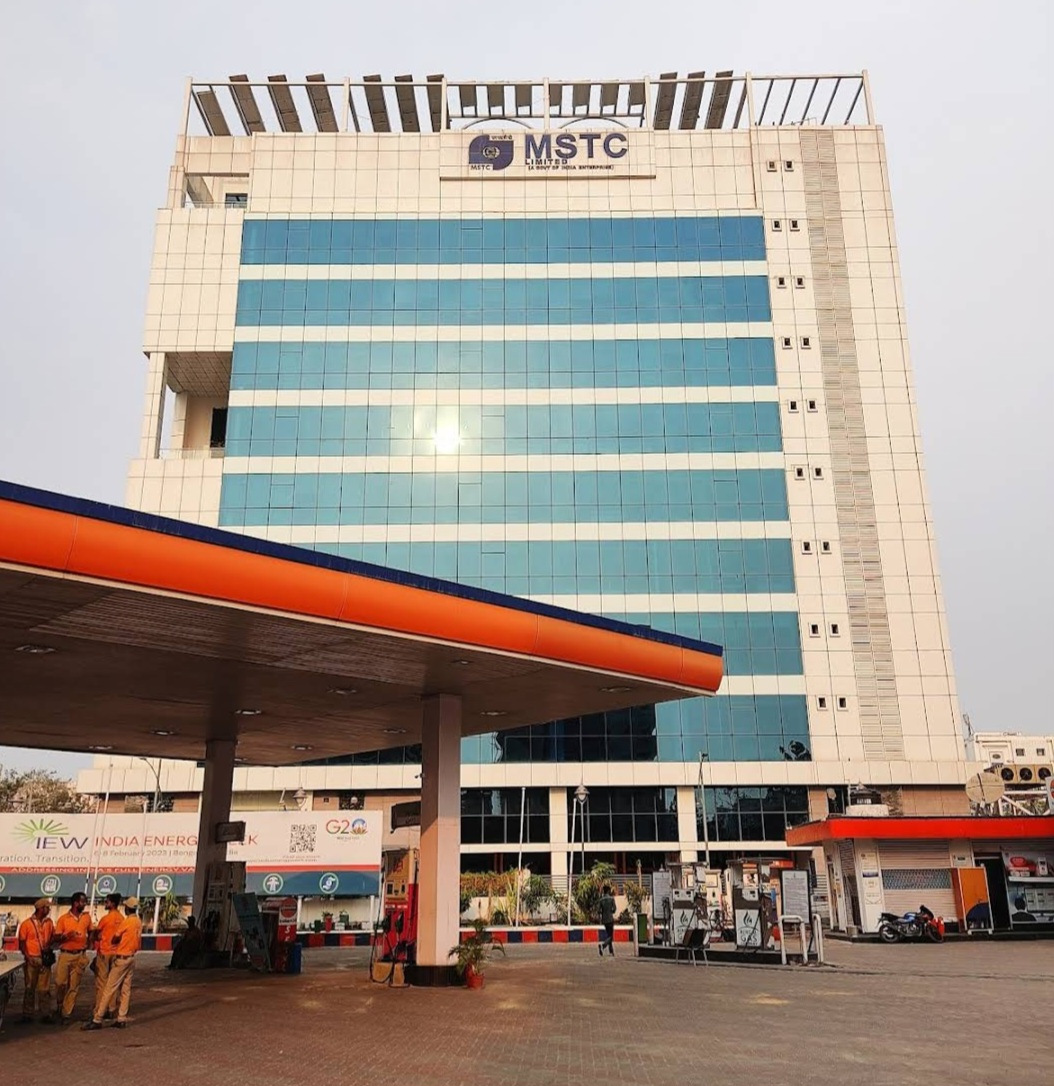
MSTC Limited HQ built by NBCC

NBCC has its corporate office in New Delhi which works as a policy maker, planner and overall controller. Corporate functions are managed through various organizational divisions viz. Project Management Group, Business Development, Real Estate, Vigilance, Contract Engineering, Law, Centralized Procurement Group (CPG), Finance, Corporate communication, Personnel & Administration.

The work of the corporation is further decentralized into various Regional Business Groups (RBGs), Strategic Business Groups (SBGs), Zones, Units and Sites. RBG/SBG/Zones are controlled by executives of the rank of ED/CGM/GM respectively who directly reports to the Director(s) sitting in HO.

Regional Business Groups and Strategic Business Group headquarters are located at Delhi as well as at other places in all the states depending upon the quantum and the nature of the projects. RBGs are headed by executive director; SBGs by CGM & Zones are headed by GM/AGM and are assisted in their work by Technical, Finance & P&A Staff of appropriate level. RBGs/SBGs/Zones control and look after several projects which are headed by Unit-in-Charges.

Each project is a profit centre and is expected to operate efficiently to achieve turnover targets and profitability as per MoU signed between the corporate office and the RBG/SBG/Zonal Heads. The units are headed by an officer of the rank of AGM/DGM/PM/DPM/SPE. The Unit In-charge is responsible for efficient execution of a project and within approved cost who is assisted by other Technical staff depending upon the nature and value of project. The unit In-charge, from time to time, appraises the Zonal In-charge about providing the requisite inputs / resources required for the execution of the work.

Project site is controlled by a Site In-charge. The project is provided with the required number of technical staff. The site in-charge is responsible for efficient execution of the project ensuring its timely completion.

The Job Description and Duties & Responsibilities of various Heads are given below:

- (A) RBG/SBG/Zonal Heads
- 1. Achieve turnover target within the specified cost/time for delivery of determined profit.
- 2. Function strictly as per the delegation of powers/financial rules in the matter of award of work and purchase of articles/goods, machines/equipments relating to works and establishment.
- 3. Maintain discipline and administrative efficiency in all the offices within the jurisdiction.
- 4. Motivate and develop the subordinates at all levels of hierarchy. To procure works in the Zone.
- 5. To conduct technical inspection of the work of the units.
- 6. Liaisoning with client/State Govt. & other bodies at appropriate levels.
- (B) RBG/SBG/Zonal Finance Incharges
- 1. Overall Incharge of Finance Section of the Zone. All financial matter/decisions are required to be taken with the concurrence of Zonal Finance Incharge.
- 2. Compliance of statutory provision in the area of tax/levy/cess and industrial law.
- 3. Compliance of contractual terms and conditions with the contractors, consultants and other vendors and apprising/advising RBG/SBG/Zonal Heads/HO on these issues.
- 4. Maintaining all financial records/data, Books of accounts, returns and reports, approvals, Bills of vendors etc. in respect of all the projects under the RBG/SBG/Zone
- 5. To observe functioning in RBG/SBG/Zones as per Delegation of Powers issued by the Corporate Office.
- (C) Unit Incharges
- 1. Responsible for efficient management of the unit.
- 2. To organise site work efficiently and ensure timely completion of the work. Responsible for overall performance of the unit which includes execution of the work in accordance with the acceptable standards.
- 3. Responsible for 100% test check of each RA bill.
- 4. Maintaining all records of the work done, mandatory site registers, quality reports, approvals and bills of vendors etc. in respect of the project.
- 5. To ensure working in units as per Delegation of Powers issued by the Corporate Office.

== History ==
NBCC was incorporated in 1960 as a wholly owned Government of India public sector undertaking (PSU) under the erstwhile Ministry of Works, Housing & Supply (MoWHS), which is now known as the Ministry of Housing and Urban Affairs (MoHUA).

In 1977, NBCC started its overseas operations.

In 2007, NBCC paid a dividend to the Government of India for the first time and since then, it has been paying a dividend every year. In the year 2008, the Department of Public Enterprises of the Ministry of Heavy Industries and Public Enterprises, through its office memorandum No. 9(8)/2008-GM dated 3 October 2008 accorded the approval of the Ministry of Housing and Urban Affairs upgrading NBCC from a Schedule "B" public sector enterprise to a Schedule "A" public sector enterprise. Subsequently, on 14 October 2008, the NBCC was granted Schedule "A" PSU status.

NBCC launched an IPO in April 2012 and was listed in BSE and NSE. In September 2012, NBCC was granted the Mini Ratna- I status by the Government of India.

The Government of India granted the status of a 'Navratna Company' to NBCC with effect from 23 June 2014. The status of a 'Navratna PSE' made NBCC eligible to invest up to Rs 1,000 crore without the requirement of explicit government approval.

In October 2014, NBCC set up its wholly owned subsidiary NBCC Services Limited (NSL). In 2021, NBCC's order book had projects worth Rs.60,000 Crore.

== Business segments ==
The Business Model of NBCC is categorized into three domains. They are project management consultancy (PMC), engineering procurement and construction (EPC) and real estate development.

- project management consultancy (PMC): NBCC majorly works as a consultant on projects from concept stage to completion & maintenance. The company earns 93% of its revenue through consultation fees paid by the government body responsible for the project.
- engineering procurement and construction (EPC): NBCC constructs cooling towers, chimneys, coal plants and ESIC hospitals through EPC services by doing feasibility studies, procurement, construction, designs and conceptualization among others. The public sector behemoth acts as an EPC agency and also engages with various government departments for project clearances. EPC revenues are a minuscule percentage of company's trade.
- real estate development: NBCC started real estate development in 1988. As of March 2019, it has been working as a land management agency for 10 CPSE's which include, HMT Watches, Hindustan Cables, Indian Drugs and Pharmaceuticals Ltd to create cost effective housing projects.

Revenue generation/redevelopment model: NBCC has been focussing on self-sustaining revenue generation model by taking up redevelopment of residential apartments for government employees and railway stations. It commercially develops the adjoining land parcels in the vicinity of the projects and makes it entirely self-sustainable. The major projects executed through this model are the GPRA colonies at New Moti Bagh and East Kidwai Nagar, New Delhi.

== Overseas Operations ==
In 1977, NBCC started working on international construction & infrastructure projects in the Middle East and African countries. The company has been engaged in the construction of National Prison Academy in Maldives, Supreme Court building and Social Housing project in Mauritius, Mahatma Gandhi International Convention Centres in 9 African countries and the India Pavilion at the Expo 2020.

== Subsidiaries and Joint Ventures ==
NBCC has formed subsidiaries and joint ventures for construction and infrastructure projects, in India and abroad.

- NBCC Services Limited
- NBCC Gulf LLC
- NBCC Engineering & Consultancy Ltd.
- Hindustan Steel Works Construction Ltd
- Real Estate Development & Construction Corporation of Rajasthan Ltd.
- NBCC Environment Engineering Limited
- NBCC International Limited

== Projects ==
=== National ===
- Indo – Bangladesh/Indo-Pak border fencing works
- 1200 bedded hospital and medical college at Guwahati, Assam
- Twin Tower World Trade Centre at Guwahati, Assam
- Hospitals for ESIC all across the country
- Solid Waste Management projects in 8 Airfield towns in India
- Bhubaneshwar and Mysore Airports
- NBCC Green View, Sector 37-D, Gurgaon
- Delhi World Trade Center, Narouji Nagar, New Delhi
- NBCC Imperia, Bhubaneswar
- NBCC Square, Chinar Park, Kolkata
- MSTC limited, Kolkata
- VIBGYOR Towers, Kolkata- 876 flats/8 towers Residential Real Estate project
- NBCC Plaza, Saket, New Delhi- Commercial Real Estate project
- LEED certified Green Building project named Indian Institute of Corporate Affairs (IICA) of the Ministry of Corporate Affairs at Manesar, Haryana
- Headquarter buildings for NIA, CBI, WHO in Delhi
- Redevelopment of 10 railway stations
- Construction of IITs, AIIMS and IIMs
- Farakka Super Thermal Power Project chimney for NTPC in West Bengal
- Constructions of two chimneys for NTPC at Barh, Bihar

=== Overseas ===
- Water Treatment Plant at Kirkuk, Iraq
- Bir Hospital in Nepal
- Construction, furnishing and equipping of 200 bedded Indira Gandhi Memorial Medical Hospital at Male, Maldives
- 48 km Kohalpur Mahakali Highway Project, Nepal
- Baghdad University
- Museum and Library Building, Hetauda, Nepal
- 1000 Houses at Bani Walid and 432 houses at Ghat, Libya
- Runway and Terminal building at Ghat and Brak Airport, Libya
- Construction of 774 housing units of Dawran, Dhamar, Yemen
- Project Management Consultancy for 3600 housing units at Meer Project in Turkey
- Hotel Ninevah Oberoi at Mousul, Baghdad
- New Supreme Court, (Mauritius)
- Construction of 2000 social housing units at Hulhumale, Maldives

== Sustainable construction ==
NBCC has adopted a policy to incorporate sustainable green features into its projects. The features include zero waste, dual piping, rainwater harvesting, solar energy, smart electricity metering, and LED/energy efficient fixtures. The projects undertaken by the company conform to green building norms. The company makes use of environment friendly techniques and materials such as steel structures, modular construction, pre-cast, pre-fab components and light weight concrete slabs.

The company also ensures strict compliance with the guidelines to curb air and water pollution at its project sites in its bid to contribute towards a safer environment.
