= Sarojini Nagar =

- Neighborhood of Delhi
- Location in Delhi, India
- Coordinates: 28.5795°N 77.1971°E
- Country: India
- State: Delhi
- District: New Delhi

Languages
  - Official: Hindi, English
- Time zone: UTC+5:30 (IST)
- PIN: 110023
- Lok Sabha constituency: New Delhi
- Civic agency: NDMC

Sarojini Nagar is a neighbourhood and a large market in New Delhi district of Delhi, India.

== Overview ==
The land was previously part of the Pillanji/Pilanji village of the Gurjar community, along with it also being developed on the acquired Jat-dominated village of Mohammadpur. Sarojini Nagar was earlier known as Vinay Nagar. In the 1970s, the government changed the name of the locality to Sarojini Nagar, after the name of the famous female freedom fighter, Sarojini Naidu. It was opined that the term Vinay Nagar creates a class divide This colony is encircled by Safdarjung Enclave, South Extension, Laxmibai Nagar, Nauroji Nagar, Chanakyapuri and Netaji Nagar. It is in the vicinity of Chanakyapuri which is home to various embassies and consulates, including those of the United States and Russia.

== Sarojini Nagar Market ==
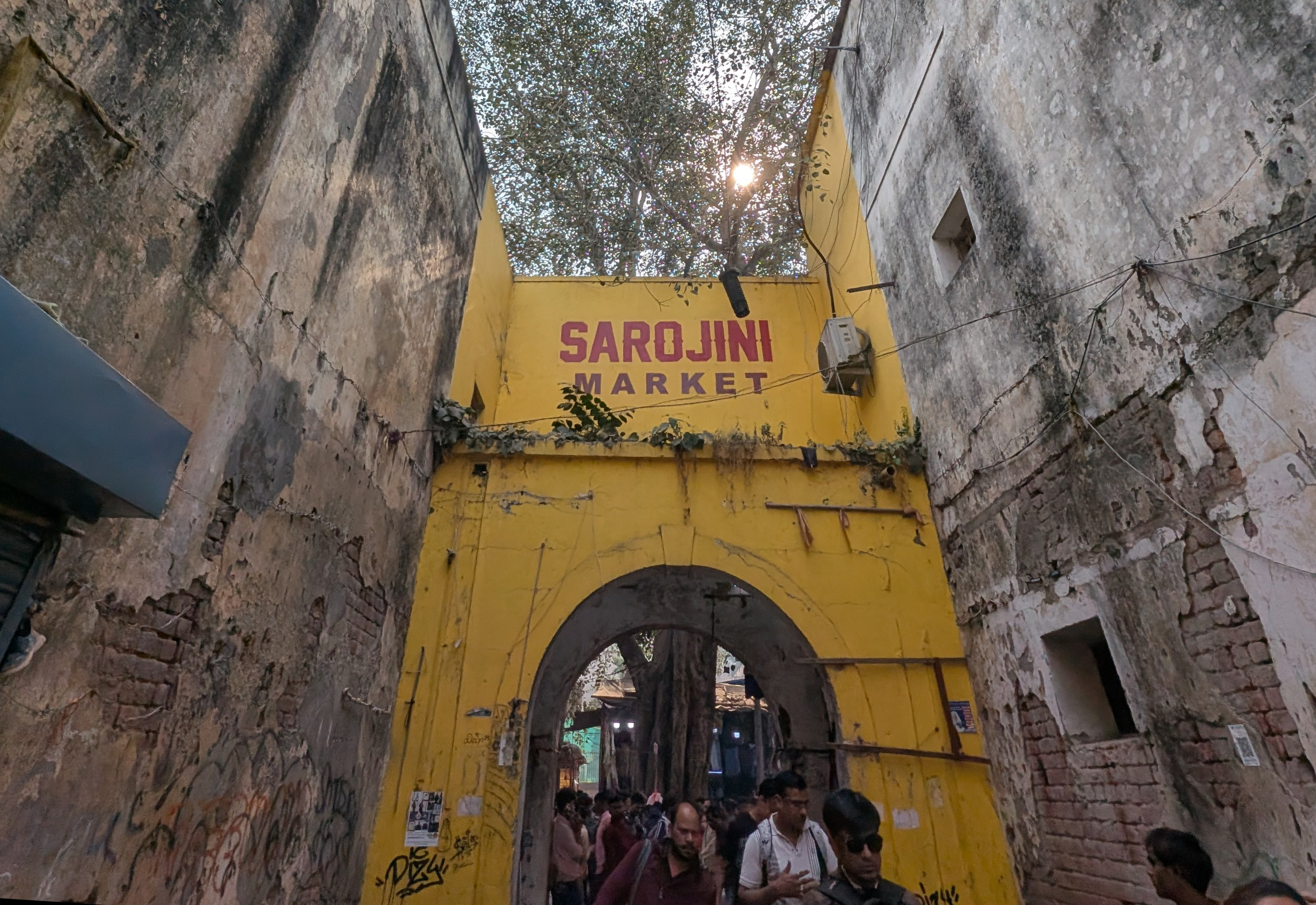
Sarojini Nagar Market

Sarojini Nagar Market is considered to be Asia's largest and most popular market. Known for very affordable products, the market primarily caters to women needs. The following are the popular items available in the market:

- Trendy Clothing: You'll find fashionable tops, dresses, jeans, and skirts at bargain prices. Seasonal wear like ummer dresses, winter jackets, and woolens are available in various styles.
- Footwear: From sneakers and sandals to boots and flats.
- Bags and Backpacks: handbags, clutches, totes, and quirky backpacks. There are various designs and branded replicas.
- Jewelry and Accessories: earrings, necklaces, bracelets, rings, scarves, belts, and air accessories in various designs and colors.
- Home Decor: rugs, cushion covers, curtains, wall hangings, and quirky showpieces.
- Sunglasses and Watches: sunglasses and watch replicas.
- Makeup and Skincare: Some shops offer makeup and skincare items. Branded beauty products are available at discounted rates.
- Street Food: local snacks such as momos, chaat, seasonal juices and shakes and golgappas.

The market, surrounded by government housing, has the following sections, as locals call them. 90% of the shops in Sarojini Nagar Market are family-owned.

Babu Market is located at the north-west corner of Sarojini Nagar Market. It has four rows of enclosed shops facing each other. Most of the shops are garment and clothes shops. The first shop on the corner of Sarojini Nagar Market which faces the north-east of Babu Market is Mahindra Sweets. This shop is outside the enclosed area of Babu Market. More famously known as Mucchal Halwayi ki Dukaan. A name was given to this shop because its owner had big moustaches. After his demise, his children have taken over the business. On rainy days or during evenings crowds line up in front of this shop to buy hot Samosas and Jalebi. This shop is followed by steel utensil shops which draw large crowds during Dhanteras.

On the north-west corner of the market, the first shop is a shoe shop. This used to be a bakery and general store till the early 1990s. Most of the shops that are enclosed in rows facing each other are garment shops. Shopping here becomes a challenge during the summers when temperatures get to 45 to 48 °C (116 °F). G, H, and I are the nearest Residential block to Babu Market. During evenings, the section of the market that faces the central market lights up with hundreds of street vendors, popcorn vendors, and other small street sellers who usually carry a small kerosene gas lamp on their carts. There is also a CGHS dispensary just opposite to Babpu Market where government employees can get a free checkup from a 24-hour available doctor. Like any other section of the market, parking is a big problem in Babu Market, especially during the evenings.

The far south end of the Sarojini Nagar market is Subzi Market. Subzi is the common Hindi word for vegetables in North India. This Subzi market is known for its fresh vegetables in South West Delhi. The vegetable vendors shout at the top of their voice to attract customers to their stalls. Some of these vendors get creative with the calls and rhyme them in a comic way.

Subzi market also sells fresh fruits. There is a parking lot behind the market facing the Government Girls Senior Secondary School No. 1.

Facing Subzi market is a section of Central Market. Until the early 1990s the corner-most shop of the western end of this market was a Sweets Shop. After the father's demise, the younger generation converted this into a garment shop. Right outside this shop, however, a traditional Tikki and Kulfi vendor continues to sell Tikki and Kulfi.

The large central market is shaped like a horizontally extended "I" or "][". The layout of the market is unique wherein visitors move around in a circle without realizing it. Shops are lined up in rows and there is a newly constructed open-air path-way in front of the shops for customers to move through the crowds to get into each shop. These pathways are also largely occupied by illegal street vendors. Shops have a front opening and a back opening. The back-streets (galiyan) of Sarojini Nagar market are just as crowded and busy as the path-ways in front of the shops. On one side of the central market, there are bakery shops.

The export lane consists of a bags store that sells various of leather and non-leather bags.

The North side of the central Sarojini Nagar market mostly has footwear shops. There are also a few leather belt vendors who occupy the space near the large arches.

A park named Fountain Garden was constructed next to the market, featuring water fountains and lights that attracted local visitors and children in the evenings. It was renovated and landscaped around 2007.

== Market timings and days ==
The Sarojini Nagar Market is open seven days a week. It opens at around 10 A.M. and shuts down around 9 P.M. The market is busier on weekends as compared to weekdays.

== Connectivity ==
Sarojini Nagar Market is well connected by road, rail, air and rapid transit. New Delhi's Safdarjung Airport and Indira Gandhi International Airport are located approximately 3 km and 9 km respectively. The nearest railway station, New Delhi Railway Station is about 9 km from the market.

For intercity travel, Rapid transit is the most popular option. The Sarojini Nagar market is serviced by the Pink Line of Delhi Metro, with the Sarojini Nagar metro station conveniently located underground. DTC buses also provide accessible public transport between Sarojini Nagar Market and other areas across Delhi NCR.

In addition, Ridesharing companies offer taxis, auto rickshaws, motorcycles, and scooters for easy access to and from the market. There are also private taxis and auto rickshaws.

== 2005 Diwali terrorist attack ==
Two days before Diwali, on 29 October 2005, a bomb was planted inside a hidden bag in the Sarojini Nagar Market. It went off at 5:56 PM, killing 37 people when the market was full of shoppers.
