= Meera Bagh =

- Neighborhood of Delhi
- Location in India
- Coordinates: 28.6591°N 77.0928°E
- Country: India
- State: Delhi
- District: West Delhi

Government
  - Body: Municipal Corporation of Delhi
- Elevation: 213 m (699 ft)

Population (2001)
  - Total: 23,095
- Time zone: UTC+5:30 (IST)
- PIN: 110087
- Civic agency: MCD

Meera Bagh is a residential colony in Paschim Vihar, which is situated in the West Delhi district in Delhi, India. The colony has over 500 houses and is divided into 2 blocks, A and B, situated on either side of Outer Ring Road. Meera Bagh was established by the noted freedom fighter Padma Shri Mir Mushtaq Ahmad under the aegis of Janta Cooperative House Building Society Limited. The original name of this society as proposed by his followers was Meer Bagh but was changed at the behest of Mir Saheb as he did not believe in personal glorification.

Also, well known Cricketer Virat Kohli has been living in Meera Bagh as one of the most notable and modest residents.

Meera Bagh is a posh colony, with well-carpeted internal roads, manicured parks and sodium vapour lamps lighting the internal roads at night, Guide Map. it is mainly maintained by Janta Cooperative House Building Society Limited.

The colony is served by a local shopping centre in A block that has been built by the Delhi Development Authority (DDA). Kirana shops, chemist, stationery shop, boutique, beauty parlour, hair-cutting saloon, drycleaner and an electrician shop, among others, in this market cater to everyday needs of the residents.

A community hall, called Meera Bhawan, is situated next to the DDA market and is available on rent to Meera Bagh residents for hosting family functions.

Meera Bagh has schools, St. Mark's Senior Secondary Public School and St. Mark's Girls School, which are run by a common society and are situated on the institutional plot that runs along the western periphery of A block. The junior branch of St. Mark's Senior Secondary Public School, called Mark's Kindergarten, operates from house number A-340.and Shishu Mandir School.

The leading banks that have branches in Meera Bagh are State Bank Of India, ICICI Bank, HDFC Bank, Axis Bank, Uco Bank, Federal Bank and Centurion Bank of Punjab. Along with the banks there are showrooms of leading sport brands like Adidas, Reebok. The residents of the society are also enjoying the newly opened salon's and Gymnasium and a plethora of facilities like Spa, Ayurvedic Treatment, Hair Cut, Bridal Make-up.

Meera Bagh crossing witnesses massive traffic jams several times a day on both up and down carriageways of the Outer Ring Road. To ease traffic flow at the crossing, the authorities have constructed a two-lane Elevated flyover (Meera Bagh to Vikas Puri) on the south-to-north approach, i.e., for traffic coming from Janak Puri and moving towards Peeragarhi (Both Connected with Metro Stations). Meera Bagh is benefited by Line 5 of Delhi Metro that run between Mundka and Inderlok/Kirti Nagar. The closest metro rail station from Meera Bagh is Peeragarhi.

Phase III of Delhi Metro has Line 5 being extended on both sides. The line is extended to Bahadurgarh in Haryana from the western end (Mundka), and to New Delhi Railway Station from the eastern end (New Ashoka Park). Line 5 also has a historical value as it is the first standard gauge railway line in the country.

Meera Bagh will be covered by Delhi Metro rail network in Phase IV which will be completed in 2021. The colony will fall on the line that will run along Outer Ring Road in north and west Delhi. According to tentative plans, this metro rail line will run between Sanjay Gandhi Transport Nagar in north Delhi and Sagarpur in west Delhi, passing through Madhuban Chowk, Peeragarhi, Meera Bagh, Uttam Nagar and Dabri crossing. A 3.4km elevated corridor between Vikaspuri and Meera Bagh was inaugurated in 2016.
