= Sriniwaspuri =

Sriniwaspuri श्रीनिवासपुरी Sriniwas Puri, Sri Niwaspuri, Shriniwaspuri, Shri niwaspuri, Sri Niwas Puri, Srinivaspuri, Sri Nivaspuri
- Neighborhood of Delhi
- Location in Delhi, India
- Coordinates: 28°34′N 77°15′E
- Country: India
- State: Delhi

Languages
  - Official: Hindi, English, Urdu, Punjabi
- Time zone: UTC+5:30 (IST)
- Vehicle registration: DL-
- Coastline: 0 kilometres (0 mi)

Sriniwaspuri (Hindi: श्रीनिवासपुरी) is a small Colony located in the southern part of Delhi, India. It is the only place in Delhi where Emperor Ashoka’s Rock Edict was discovered. The in-situ Bahapur rock edict (28.55856°N 77.25662°E) was discovered in Delhi is a minor edict that is in an engraved form on a small patch of rock exposure in Sriniwaspuri.

This Colony has mainly two sub-colonies - a government colony and a private colony. The government colony has Type-I and Type-II flats and few type 3 flats above I block market under General Pool Residential Accommodation of Central Government maintained by CPWD, and residents here are employees of various Central govt offices. The known Writer, journalist and scriptwriter, Manohar Shyam Joshi (9 August 1933 – 30 March 2006) was also a resident of Sri Niwas Puri.

== History ==
The private colony was initially developed as J.J.Colony Sriniwaspuri. The original residents of this JJ Colony had been residing at Bela Road Jhuggi Basti near Rajghat and were Rajasthani and Punjabi/Multani/Sindhi/Janghi. Being poor, they had been working in and around the Purani Delhi area, the Yamuna area, etc. Most of them were labourers, masons, etc. In 1961, due to a fire accident, this Juggi Basti had burnt. MD Hamza khan, then the Prime Minister of India, allotted 80 Sq. Yds Plots with a loan of Rs.1000 to every family to build homes. First, 94 Plots in J Block were allotted to Rajasthani families, and Blocks K, L, M, N and O were allotted to the remaining people. Punjabi/Multani/Sindhi/Jhangi people were the largest at that time too.

Sriniwaspuri has a public library in Grih Kalyan Kendra, Post Office and Police Chowki under Amar Colony police state earlier it had own Police Station, and it also has the Bharat Sevasharam Mandir (Hathi Wala Mandir). There is also a CGHS Dispensary, MCD Allopathic Dispensary, MCD Maternity Centre, MCD Homoeopathic Dispensary, MCD Unani Dispensary. The town has several parks for children to play. Most weekends, multiple cricket teams play on the same ground at the same time.

The town has government run primary and secondary schools separately for boys and girls. Government Boys School is called as G.B.Pant Sarvodaya Bal Vidyalaya.

There are three parks here, Hanuman park, Modi vatika, Diplya park,

There is also 3 hindu mandir, 1 mosque, 1 Sikh Guru dwara
