= Fateh Nagar =

- Neighborhood of Delhi
- Location in India
- Coordinates: 28.630374°N 77.10057°E
- Country: India
- State: National Capital Territory of Delhi
- District: West Delhi

Government
  - Body: Municipal Corporation of Delhi

Languages
- Time zone: UTC+5:30 (IST)
- PIN: 110018
- Telephone code: 011
- Lok Sabha constituency: Outer Delhi
- Civic agency: Municipal Corporation of Delhi

'Fateh Nagar' is mainly a Sikh and Punjabi Hindu colony, in West Delhi near Tilak Nagar behind the Jail Road. Jail Road Furniture Market is one of the landmarks of this colony. Around 1,00,000 people visit this Gurudwara on Tuesday. It was built on the lands of the previously greater Tihar village.

Fateh Nagar is a pleasant and a clean place with a lot of flourishing business like furniture, eateries etc. Fateh Nagar is famous for the Chhote Sahibzade's (The 2 younger sons of the Guru Gobind Singh) Sikh Gurudwara in this colony. The residents of Fateh Nagar are warm and friendly, Fateh Nagar is a place where neighbours become family

The attractions of Fateh Nagar include the 'Jheel wala Park' which translates to 'Park with a lake' and the Masjid Park. The jail road furniture market is renowned for its quality goods. The Gurudwaras in Fateh Nagar are also a major attraction. The most important feature of this place is the love and togetherness of the families here.

Fateh Nagar has two major Gurudwaras. One is Gurudwara Sri Guru Singh sabha, which is behind woodland showroom, and also the Chhote Sahibzade's Gurudwara mentioned earlier. The history of this Gurudwara is very interesting. The founder of this Gurudwara was an elderly woman who did not have children. She prayed and prayed until one day Guru Gobind Singh Ji's sons Sahibzada Zoravar Singh Ji and Sahibzada Fateh Singh Ji came to her in a dream and told her that She was not blessed with a child, but instead a very famous Gurudwara would be built at the place of her home. Sure enough, today the 'Chhote Sahibjaade Gurudwara' is famous all over India, and people flock to view the Gurudwara and offer their prayers. It is also known as Mangal Gurdwara as the day Tuesday is considered auspicious. Hundreds visit Gurudwara on Tuesdays to fulfill their dreams, expectations, etc. which are said to come true.

Fateh Nagar is very near to Choti sabji mandi, Prem Nagar, Ashok Nagar, Asha/Usha Park, Shiv Nagar, Varinder Nagar, Tilak Nagar, Subhash Nagar. Fateh Nagar is most famous for Its Gurudwara Chhote Sahibzade, Electronics and for latest design wooden furniture. It is near to the Famous Tihar Jail. Many food outlets are blooming here, including McDonald's, Domino's, 36 China Town, Gianis, Manjeet Chicken and a lot more.

Also now many new brand showrooms have also started to set up. Some are Woodland, Puma, Reebok, Adidas, Wrangler, UCB, Levi's, Fila and many more.

There are schools such as SKV, Sukho Khalsa and GHPS which are very famous.

The Holy Gurudwara and Fateh Nagar Market which is also called as Jail Road Market is located on main road. You can find here both serviced and business-class families. Fateh Nagar is very neat and clean area. Even most of the properties are newly built.

Nearest Metro station is Tilak Nagar station on Blue line. Tilak Nagar market is main market offering variety in clothes, shoes, groceries etc. Indian oil petrol pump is also available on the main jail road. Going from Tilak Nagar metro station on jail road takes one to Delhi Cantt. and eventually offer a short cut to IGI Airport and Gurugram.
