= State Council of Educational Research and Training, Delhi =

Government agency

State Council of Educational Research and Training Delhi
- Type: Autonomous body of the Government of NCT of Delhi
- Established: 1988
- Location: (India) New Delhi, India
- Website: scert.delhi.gov.in

State Council of Educational Research and Training (SCERT), Delhi is an autonomous body of the Government of Delhi. It is a nodal agency recognized by the National Council of Teacher Education (NCTE) for admission, curriculum construction, course conduct, guidance, examination and certification of pre-service training programme in the area of pre-primary teacher education and elementary education. The SCERT also oversees and provides necessary guidance towards effective functioning of 9 DIETs of Delhi, which among other activities also conducts 2 years pre-service Diploma Course in Elementary Teacher Education.

During more than two decades, the SCERT has made significant contribution in the area of school education in general and teacher education, in particular. As of June 2011, SCERT is working with 9 District Institute of Education and Training (DIET), 21 Recognized Private Institutes imparting 2 Year Full Time Diploma Programme in Elementary Teacher Education and 30 Recognized Private Institutes imparting 2 Year Full Time Diploma Programme in Early Childhood Care and Education, located in different districts of Delhi, with the total annual intake of 4150.

== History ==
The 1986 National Policy on Education, NPE, recommended the creation of State Council of Educational Research and Training (SCERT) in each State as a measure of decentralization of functions of quality education, research and training. SCERT, Delhi, was set up as an autonomous body under the Societies Registration Act in May 1988.

== Pre-Service Training Programme ==
SCERT currently affiliates 2 pre-service teacher education programme for undergraduate students, SCERT is responsible for preparing the curriculum, prescribing syllabi, course of study, academic calendar for these Courses:

== District Institute of Education and Training ==
As of 2011, 9 District Institutes of Education and Training (DIETs) have been set up for each of the 9 revenue districts in Delhi and these operate under the overall administrative control of SCERT.

- DIET (West), Old Rajinder Nagar, New Delhi
- DIET (North), Keshav Puram, Delhi.
- DIET (South), Moti Bagh, New Delhi
- DIET (East), Karkardooma, Delhi
- DIET (Central), Darya Ganj, New Delhi
- DIET (South- West), Gummanhera, New Delhi
- DIET (North- West), Pitam Pura, Delhi
- DIET (North – East), Dilshad Garden, New Delhi
- DIET (New Delhi), RK Puram, New Delhi

== Initiatives ==
=== In-Service Teacher Education ===
SCERT organizes in-service teacher education programmes for teachers of MCD, NDMC and Dte. of Education. Special workshops for Heads of Schools are also undertaken. During the period 1991–2005, SCERT, along with DIETs, have organized in-service training/orientation programmes for 91, 273 personnel. Heads of Schools, educational administrators, and teachers.

=== Publications ===
SCERT is responsible for material development both for children and support materials for teachers. Between 1988 and 2005, 215 publications have been brought out by SCERT.

=== Universal Elementary Education Mission ===
SCERT-DIETs is also resource support organisation for Universal Elementary Education Mission (UEEM), under which Sarva Shiksha Abhiyan and Primary Education Enhancement Programmes are undertaken.

=== Entrepreneurship Mindset Curriculum ===
In 2019 SCERT started the Entrepreneurship Mindset curriculum in order to promote Entrepreneurship in Government school students in New Delhi. The program invited a number of entrepreneurs to schools and have a conversation with students about their journey.

Following COVID-19 pandemic and a Lockdown in India, SCERT decided to run these events online on YouTube.

Under the Entrepreneurship Mindset Curriculum, students across the Government schools in Delhi got an opportunity to know what the path of entrepreneurship entails. The curriculum was rolled out on 22 October 2019, and it managed to reach 150,336 students in 588 government schools.

=== Other Initiatives ===
==== Seminars/Conferences ====
SCERT organized National Seminar on Good School Management Practices in February 2011 at New Delhi.

== See also ==
- National Council for Teacher Education
- teacher training college

== Sources ==
- Website of State Council of Educational Research and Training and National Council of Teacher Education
