= Begampur, Rohini =

- Village of Delhi
- Location in India Begampur, Rohini (India)
- Coordinates: 28.72714°N 77.05948°E
- Country: India
- Union Territory: Delhi
- District: North West

Population (2001)
  - Total: 25,000

Languages
  - Official: Hindi, English
- Time zone: UTC+5:30 (IST)
- Postal code: 110086

Begampur is a census town in Rohini, Delhi in the Union territory of Delhi, India.

== Demographics ==
As of 2001 India census, Begampur had a population of 22,828. Males constitute 55% of the population and females 45%. Begampur has an average literacy rate of 74%, higher than the national average of 59.5%; with 54% of the males and 46% of females literate. 19% of the population is under 6 years of age.
