= Rama Krishna Puram =

- Neighborhood of Delhi
- Location in Delhi, India
- Coordinates: 28.566008°N 77.176743°E
- Country: India
- State: Delhi
- District: New Delhi district

Languages
  - Official: Hindi
- Time zone: UTC+5:30 (IST)
- Planning agency: NDMC

Ramakrishna Puram popularly known as R.K. Puram, is a residential colony in New Delhi in the South West district of Delhi, India.

== History ==
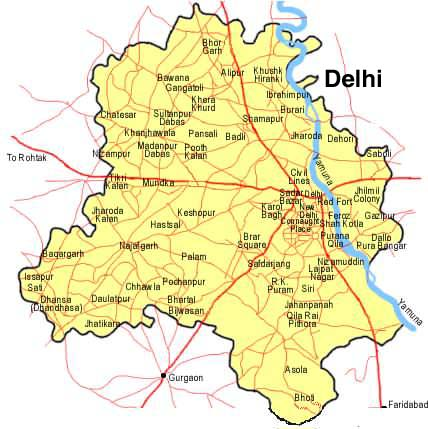
Map of Delhi showing location of R. K. Puram

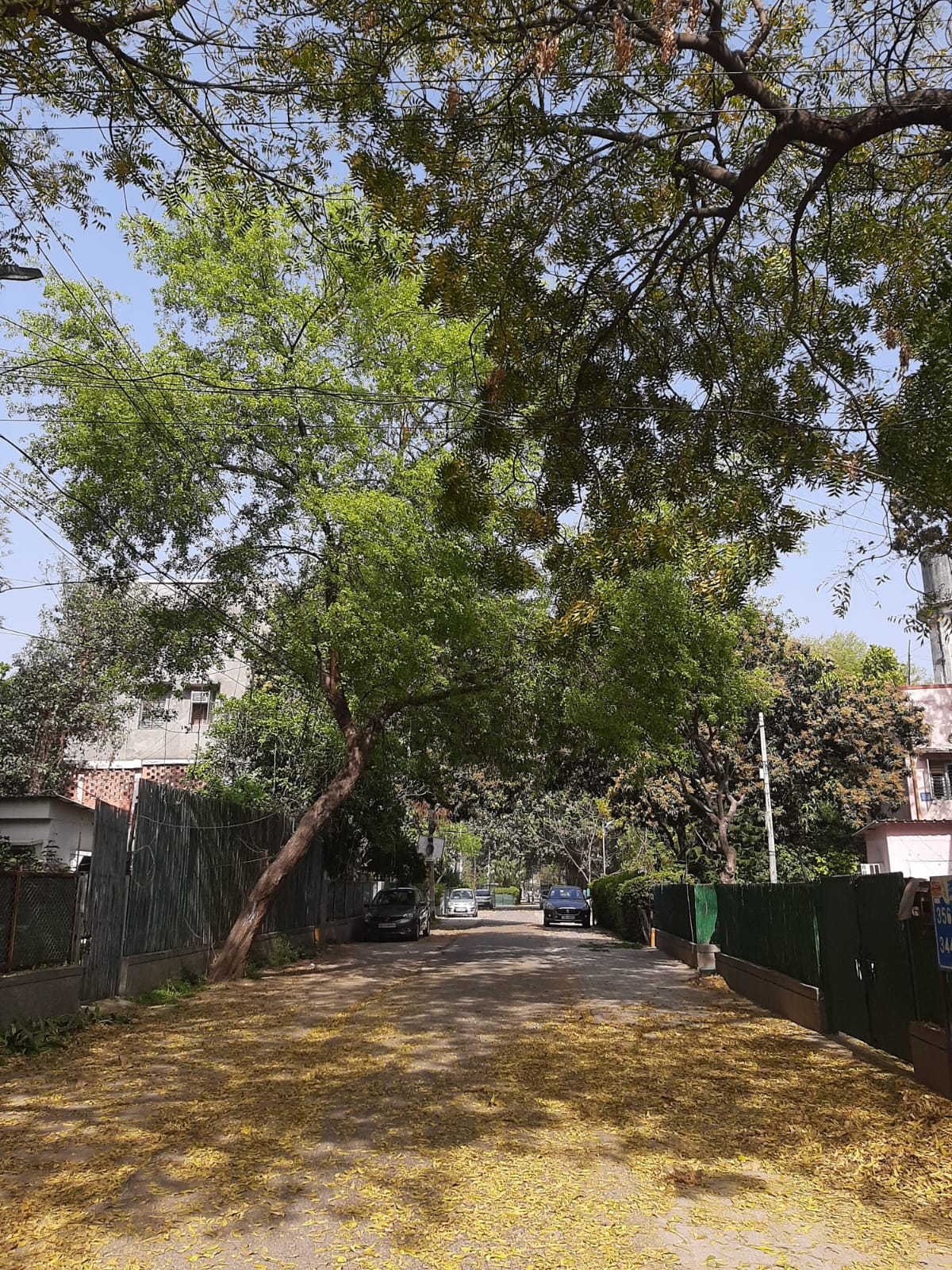
Sector 9 Colony Street, R.K Puram

Rama Krishna Puram area was built in the second phase of the extension of New Delhi. It was developed on the acquired Jat-dominated village of Mohammadpur. Construction of R. K. Puram started in the late 1950s by acquiring illegally occupied barren lands. Developed by CPWD to the south-west of the Secretariat Building, its development continued until the 1970s, when R. K. Puram was fully established. It mostly contains double-storeyed housing blocks with 2–3 bedroom apartments for central government officers.

Som Vihar, named after Maj Som Nath Sharma, Param Vir Chakra, came up in the mid-1980s as a cooperative housing society for defence forces officers under the aegis of the Army Welfare Housing Organisation, in what is sometimes referred to as Sector 10. Some high-rise apartment blocks like Nivedita Kunj for senior officers were added in the 1990s. Gradually, markets were added in each pocket, along with schools and places of worship. Today the area also houses several residences of the Government of India.
