= Sarvodaya Enclave =

- Neighborhood of Delhi
- Location in Delhi, India
- Coordinates: 28.537207°N 77.201186°E
- Country: India
- State: Delhi
- District: South Delhi

Languages
  - Official: Hindi
- Time zone: UTC+5:30 (IST)
- Planning agency: Municipal Corporation of Delhi

Sarvodaya Enclave is an affluent residential colony in the Adhchini area of the South Delhi District of Delhi, capital of India.

== Places of interest ==
The colony has several beautiful houses that attract architects and interior decorators from around geographies. It also has a Temple and Gurdwara within its boundaries. Adjacent to the colony there is Sri Aurobindo Ashram, Delhi Branch, The Mother's International School, and Mirambika Free Progress School. There is also an extension counter of UCO Bank within the Ashram boundaries.

The colony is very green and houses many known veterans of diverse fields. It is one of the first areas in Delhi to conduct a tree census in 2012. When a second round of audit was conducted in 2018 and 2019, 77 trees were missing.

== DDA Market ==
A small market inside the colony serves the residents of the colony with basic needs like Medicines, Groceries and Stationery. There is also a cyber cafe, photocopying and courier shops in the market. It has more than 300 stand alone houses which are further divided into multiple condos. It is one of the rich neighbourhoods in South Delhi with easy access to neighbouring cities of Gurgaon and Noida. It has easy connectivity to the Delhi Metro with Hauz Khas metro station being the closest one.
