= Shastri Nagar, Delhi =

Shastri Nagar
- Neighborhood of Delhi
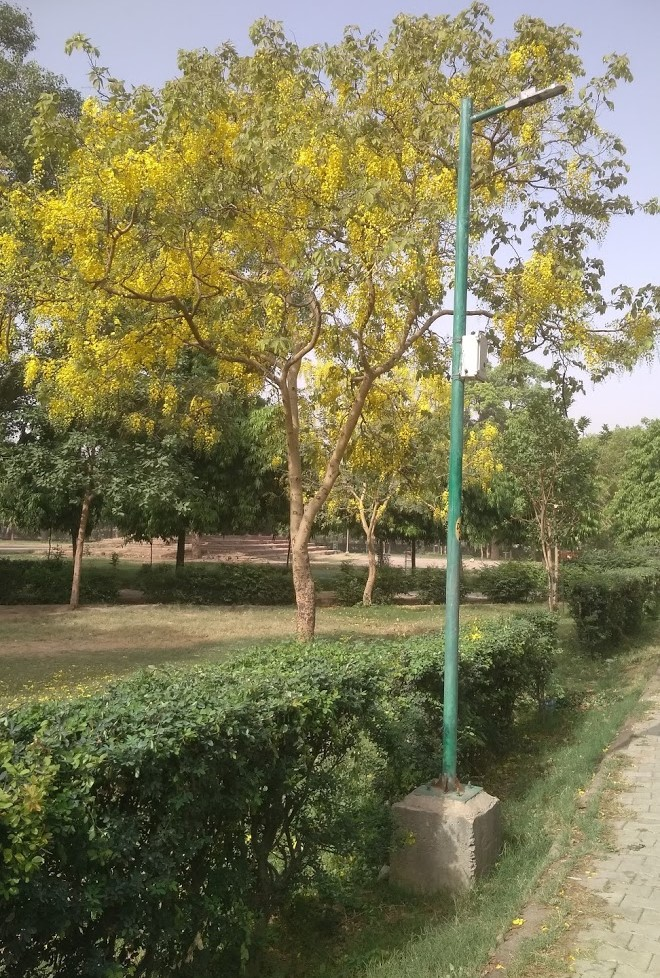
- 56 Bigha Park M Block

- Location in north-west Delhi, India Shastri Nagar (India)
- Coordinates: 28.6722°N 77.1741°E
- Country: India
- State: Delhi
- District: North West Delhi

Government
  - Body: North Delhi Municipal Corporation
  - Member of Parliament: Dr. Harsh Vardhan

Languages
  - Official: Hindi, English
  - Additional official: Punjabi; Urdu
- Time zone: UTC+5:30 (IST)
- PIN: 110052
- Lok Sabha: Chandni Chowk
- Vidhan Sabha: Sadar Bazar

Shastri Nagar is a mixed-use locality in North West Delhi district in City - S P Zone under the Jurisdiction of NDMC (North Delhi Municipal Corporation) in the National Capital Territory of Delhi. Shastri Nagar is one of the Category E residential colonies in Delhi. Shastri Nagar is part of the Sadar Bazar assembly constituency and Chandni Chowk parliamentary constituency.

Shastri Nagar is located on the Veer Banda Bairagi Marg of DTC, and Red Line of DMRC (Shastri Nagar Metro Station). Daya Basti, Subzi Mandi and Sarai Rohilla railway stations connect the area with the Indian Railways Network.
