= Kanhaiya Nagar metro station =

Metro station in Delhi, India

Kanhaiya Nagar

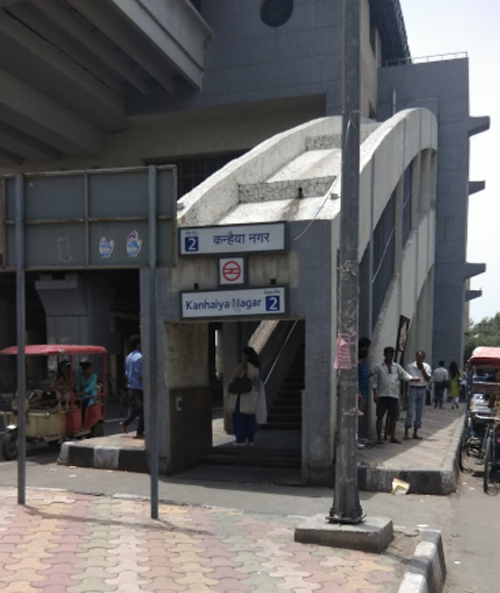
- Kanhaiya Nagar metro station

General information
- Location: Kanhaiya Nagar, Tri Nagar, Delhi, 110035
- Coordinates: 28°40′57″N 77°09′53″E
- System: Delhi Metro station
- Owner: Delhi Metro Rail Corporation
- Line: Red Line
- Platforms: Side platform Platform-1 → Rithala; Platform-2 → Shaheed Sthal (New Bus Adda)
- Tracks: 2

Construction
- Structure type: Elevated
- Platform levels: 2
- Parking: Available
- Accessible: Yes

Other information
- Station code: KN

History
- Opened: 31 March 2004; 22 years ago
- Electrified: 25 kV 50 Hz AC through overhead catenary

Passengers
- Jan 2015: 8,794 /day 272,616/ Month average

Services
Preceding station	Delhi Metro	Following station
Keshav Puram towards Rithala	Red Line	Inderlok towards Shaheed Sthal (New Bus Adda)
Route map
Location

The Kanhaiya Nagar metro station is located on the Red Line of the Delhi Metro. in North West Delhi district of New Delhi, India .This Metro Station serves thousand of daily commuters. The main beneficiary are those living in Kanhaiya Nagar (Tri Nagar) and Ashok Vihar.

== Station layout ==
L2	Side platform | Doors will open on the left
L2	Platform 2 Eastbound	Towards → Shaheed Sthal (New Bus Adda); Next Station: Inderlok Change at the next station for Green Line
L2	Platform 1 Westbound	Towards ← Rithala; Next Station: Keshav Puram
L2	Side platform | Doors will open on the left
L1	Concourse	Fare control, station agent, Metro Card vending machines, crossover
G	Street Level	Exit/Entrance

== Entry/Exit ==
Kanhaiya Nagar metro station Entry/exits
Gate No-1	Gate No-2	Gate No-3	Gate No-4
Tota Ram Bazaar	Tri Nagar	JJ Colony	MDC Complex

== Facilities ==
List of available ATM at Tri Nagar metro station are

- Punjab National Bank
- Oriental Bank of Commerce

Tri Nagar Metro station also has a parking facility.

Delhi Metro Parking charges

Types of Vehicles	Parking Charges in INR			Monthly charges	Night charges (Extra) (00:00 hrs to 05:00 hrs)	
Types of Vehicles	Up to 6 hrs.	Up to 12 hrs.	More Than 12 hrs.	Monthly charges	Daily	Monthly
Cars/SUV/Taxis	20	30	40	1000	40	1000
Two Wheelers/Auto rickshaws (Scooter, Motorbike.)	10	15	20	475	20	475
Cycle	3	4	5	45	5	45

== See also ==
- List of Delhi Metro stations
- Transport in Delhi
- Delhi Metro Rail Corporation
- Delhi Suburban Railway
- List of rapid transit systems in India
- Delhi Transport Corporation
- List of Metro Systems
