= Ashram Chowk =

Ashram Chowk Ashram
- Neighbourhood of Delhi
- Location in Delhi, India
- Coordinates: 28.5911°N 77.2036°E
- Country: India
- State: Delhi
- District: South East Delhi
- Time zone: UTC+5:30 (IST)
- PIN: 110014
- Vehicle registration: DL
- Civic agency: SDMC

Ashram Chowk is a crossways located on the southeastern corner of the Delhi Ring Road. It is at the intersection of the Ring Road and Mathura Road from the ITO crossing, the Supreme Court, Pragati Maidan, Purana Quila, Nizamuddin Dargah and the Haryana border at Faridabad.

== Ashram Chowk flyover ==
The Ashram Chowk Flyover Project, conducted by Consulting Engineering Services, was completed in 2001, and opened to traffic on 30 October of the same year. It passes over Ashram Chowk and helps to ease congestion towards the DND Flyway.

== See also ==
- Ring Road, Delhi
- Pragati Maidan
- Mathura Road, Delhi
- Purana Qila, Delhi
- DND Flyway
- Neighborhoods of Delhi
