= New Moti Bagh =

New Moti Bagh New Moti Bagh Colony
- Neighbourhood of Delhi
- Location in Delhi, India New Moti Bagh (India)
- Coordinates: 28.582005°N 77.171684°E
- Country: India
- State: Delhi
- District: New Delhi

Government
  - Type: Municipal Council
  - Body: New Delhi Municipal Council

Area
  - Total: .50 km^{2} (0.19 sq mi)

Languages
  - Official: Hindi, English
- Time zone: UTC+5:30 (IST)
- PIN: 110021
- Lok Sabha constituency: New Delhi
- Civic agency: NDMC

New Moti Bagh is a residential colony in New Delhi. New Moti Bagh occupies an area of 143 acres, in the exclusive New Delhi Municipal Council (NDMC) area of New Delhi. It is one of Delhi's most expensive areas, where land rates vary from ₹10 lakh (US$10,000) to ₹12 lakh (US$12,000) per square yard.

To raise funds for construction of New Moti Bagh a three acre parcel of land contiguous to the project was sold to Leela Group, a hotel chain, for ₹650 crore (US$67 million), at about ₹216 crore (US$22 million) per acre. At this rate, the total land value of the 123 acres (0.50 km^{2}) New Moti Bagh township (or colony, as is called in India) at current market rates, works out to about ₹31,000 crore (US$3.2 billion). "Living in New Moti Bagh", according to senior Government official, is "next best thing to living in a Lutyens bungalow”.

== History ==
Sanction for the project was given by the United Progressive Alliance (UPA) government led by Manmohan Singh in 2007. Work on the complex started in December of the same year. The project was assigned to the National Buildings Construction Corporation (NBCC), a Government of India undertaking. The work on the project was completed in 2012.

== Residential Accommodation ==
There are a total of 492 residential units in the complex: 116 independent bungalows, and 376 large sized apartments. These residential units are provided to civil servants, police officers, and Judges, based on their pay grades, at a very nominal rent, free of tax, maintenance, security, civic, and other infrastructure liabilities, which are all paid by the government. The residential complex is popular and has a 99 percent occupancy. All units, and public areas, have power back-up. All units are also provided with solar water heating, assured hot and cold water, high grade floor finishing, and modular kitchens. In addition to the housing for senior civil servants there are 500 units for servants and other service providers, classified as Economical Weaker Section (EWS).

=== Type VIII Bungalows ===
There are 14 type VIII Bungalows in the complex. These are meant for Cabinet Ministers, Judges of Supreme Court & High Court of Delhi, Ministers of State (MoS) and Key Secretaries to Government of India. These large bungalows with a plot size of 8,250 square feet (766 m^{2}), with drive ways, front and rear lawn and design features similar to bungalows in Lutyens' Delhi. Each bungalow includes four servant quarters and two garages. The market value of this type of bungalow, based on current value of similar properties in the neighborhood, is from ₹70 crore (US$7.3 million) to ₹100 crore (US$10 million), and rental rates would be several lakhs a month.

=== Type VII Bungalows ===
There are 102 type VII Bungalows, each with a total area of 3,036 square feet (282.1 m^{2}). These bungalows, which are smaller than type VIII, are intended for the officers belong to pay level 17 & above This type of bungalow have three servant quarters, two garages, front and rear lawns, and a driveway. The market value of this type of bungalow, based on current value of similar properties, is from ₹40 crore (US$4.2 million) to ₹60 crore (US$6.2 million).

=== Type VI Multistorey Apartments ===
There are 376 type 6A apartments in ten blocks. Each with a total area of 1,040 square feet (97 m^{2}). These are meant for officers in the pay rank of level 15 & above. These apartments in addition to the dining and living room have 3 bedrooms, 1 guest room, and 2 servant quarters, and covered parking. The market value of these apartments, based on current value of similar properties in the neighborhood, is between ₹10 crore (US$1.0 million) to ₹15 crore (US$1.6 million).

== Amenities ==
The New Moti Bagh residential complex is configured like a township. It has its own security (with CCTV, scanners, guards), captive power supply, solar heating system, solar lighting, waste management system, sewage recycling systems, water management systems, rainwater harvesting system, shopping centre, ATM bank, a restaurant, subsidized club, primary school, parks, jogging tracks, servant quarters etc.

The New Moti Bagh club has a swimming pool, tennis courts, indoor badminton courts, squash court, gym, pool, billiards, and table tennis. The club also has indoor events halls and outdoor lawn for hosting private events, and a restaurant-bar called Pearl Garden.

== Controversies ==
The New Moti Bagh residential club, in December 2013, become a source of acrimony between the Government and the civil servants. The New Moti Bagh Resident Welfare Association (NMBRWA), the Representative body of the civil servants, questioned the right of the Government to lease the club area to generate revenue, and threatened the government with legal action claiming that they have exclusive right over the use of the facility. Sudhir Krishna, the then Secretary, Ministry Of Urban Development, in response to circular by the NMBRWA warned that the residents are "tenants" of government housing, and "should not be demanding".

== Water and Waste Management ==
New Moti Bagh Township consumes 800,000 liters of water every day, or approximately 1626 liters per household. It generate about 600,000 liters of sewage per day, which works out to about 1219 litres per household. The wastewater is treated in a 'wastewater treatment facility‘ which has capacity to 'purify' 5,60,000 litres of wastewater per day. The surplus treated water, according to an official National Buildings Construction Corporation (NBCC), "will be supplied to NDMC for irrigation and horticulture use". The township generates 4.5 tonnes household and 4 tonnes of horticulture waste per day. This is treated in a solid waste treatment plant, and an organic waste converter machine, which has a capacity of 1.5 tonnes per shift.

== Security ==
There are three entrances to the complex - the double-gated main entrance on Shanti Path, an entrance opposite The Leela Palace, one facing Netaji Nagar. All the entrances are guarded and entry to the colony is restricted to residents and guests. The complex is covered by stringent security system with scanners and CCTV coverage etc.
