= Naveen Shahdara =

- Neighborhood of Delhi
- Location in Delhi, India
- Coordinates: 28.675095°N 77.281523°E
- Country: India
- State: Delhi
- District: North East Delhi

Government
  - Body: Municipal Corporation Of Delhi

Languages
  - Official: Hindi, English
- Time zone: UTC+5:30 (IST)
- PIN: 110032
- Telephone code: 011-2232
- Nearest city: Ghaziabad
- Lok Sabha constituency: North East Delhi
- Vidhan Sabha constituency: Rohtas Nagar
- Civic agency: Municipal Corporation Of Delhi

Naveen Shahdara is an affluent residential area for the upper middle and business class, located in the North East Delhi district of Delhi, India. The area is known for its rising property prices thus making it one of the upmarket areas of Shahdara.

Tikona Park and Mohan Park are two of the many popular lung spaces in the area, which also has the Shahdara lake.
