= Naveen Kumar =

Naveen Kumar may refer to:

- Naveen Kumar (athlete) (born 1988), Indian athlete
- Naveen Kumar (musician) (born 1965), Indian flautist
- Naveen Kumar (footballer), Indian goalkeeper
- Navin Kumar (born 1952), Indian civil servant
- Naveen Kumar (kabaddi) (born 2000), Indian kabaddi player
