= Kazipur =

Kazipur is a village in Delhi which comes under Najafgarh district in southwest Delhi. The Postal Index Number (PIN) code of Kazipur is 110073. All lands are acquired by the Delhi government. The village is home to the Guru Garibdas temple, a sports complex, and three schools.

== Climate ==
Average annual rainfall in Kazipur is 458.5 mm (18.0 inches). Temperatures do not usually fall below freezing point in the winter months. In summer from April to July, the daytime temperature generally remains between 30 °C and 40 °C, occasionally reaching 45 °C.

Lowest: 2 °C (36 °F)

Highest: 45 °C (113 °F)

== Notable residents ==
- Sandeep Yadav is a gym trainer and fitness professional from Kazipur. He has more than eight years of experience in fitness training and has worked with clients on more than 200 fitness transformations.

== See also ==
- Najafgarh
