= Netaji Nagar, Delhi =

Netaji Nagar
- Neighborhood of Delhi
- Location in Delhi, India
- Coordinates: 28.58208°N 77.19404°E
- Country: India
- State: Delhi
- District: New Delhi

Languages
  - Official: Hindi
- Time zone: UTC+5:30 (IST)
- Planning agency: NDMC

Netaji Nagar is a part of New Delhi and comes under the New Delhi district. It predominantly has official government residences/quarters. The community is located close to Shanti path which has several embassies. The Prime Minister's residence is approximately 2 km away. Delhi College of Arts and Commerce is situated in the locality. Some other nearby locations include Safdarjung Enclave, R.K. Puram Sector 13, Hyatt Regency hotel, Bhikaji Cama Place, Palika Bhawan, Leela Palace.The area is named in the memory of Netaji Subhas Chandra Bose

There was an illegal slum there which was demolished on 19 September 2010.
