= Keshav Puram metro station =

Metro station in Delhi, India

Keshav Puram

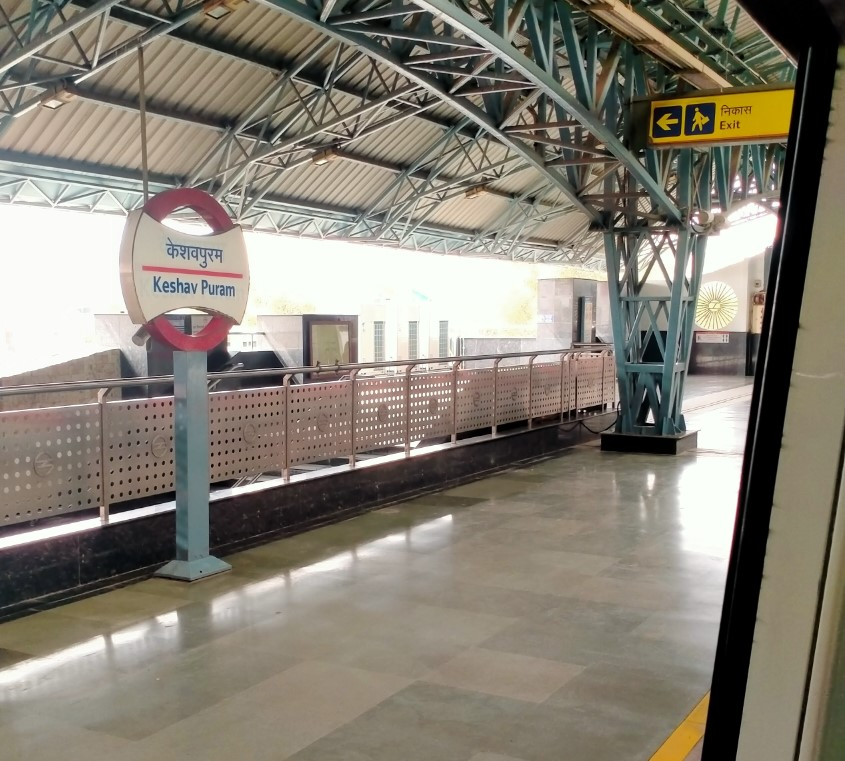

General information
- Location: Maharaja Nahar Singh Marg, Pocket F, Keshav Puram, Delhi, 110035
- Coordinates: 28°41′20″N 77°09′42″E
- System: Delhi Metro station
- Owner: Delhi Metro Rail Corporation
- Line: Red Line
- Platforms: Side platform Platform-1 → Rithala; Platform-2 → Shaheed Sthal (New Bus Adda)
- Tracks: 2

Construction
- Structure type: Elevated
- Platform levels: 2
- Parking: Available

Other information
- Station code: KP

History
- Opened: 31 March 2004; 22 years ago
- Electrified: 25 kV 50 Hz AC through overhead catenary

Passengers
- Jan 2015: 7,350 /day 227,848/ Month average

Services
Preceding station	Delhi Metro	Following station
Netaji Subhash Place towards Rithala	Red Line	Kanhaiya Nagar towards Shaheed Sthal (New Bus Adda)
Route map
Location

Keshav Puram is a metro station located on the Red Line of the Delhi Metro. The station is located in the Keshav Puram locality of North West Delhi district of Delhi.

== Station layout ==
L2	Side platform | Doors will open on the left
L2	Platform 2 Eastbound	Towards → Shaheed Sthal (New Bus Adda); Next Station: Kanhaiya Nagar
L2	Platform 1 Westbound	Towards ← Rithala; Next Station: Netaji Subhash Place; Change at the next station for Pink Line
L2	Side platform | Doors will open on the left
L1	Concourse	Fare control, station agent, Metro Card vending machines, crossover
G	Street Level	Exit/Entrance

== Facilities ==
List of available ATM at Keshav Puram metro station are

== Entry/Exit ==
Keshav Puram metro station Entry/exits
Gate No-1	Gate No-2	Gate No-3	Gate No-4
Chotu Ram Dharamshala	Keshav Puram Residential Area		Ashok Vihar
Dispensary			

== See also ==
- List of Delhi Metro stations
- Transport in Delhi
- Delhi Metro Rail Corporation
- Delhi Suburban Railway
- List of rapid transit systems in India
- Delhi Transport Corporation
- List of Metro Systems
