= Nalin Mehta =

Indian political scientist, journalist and writer

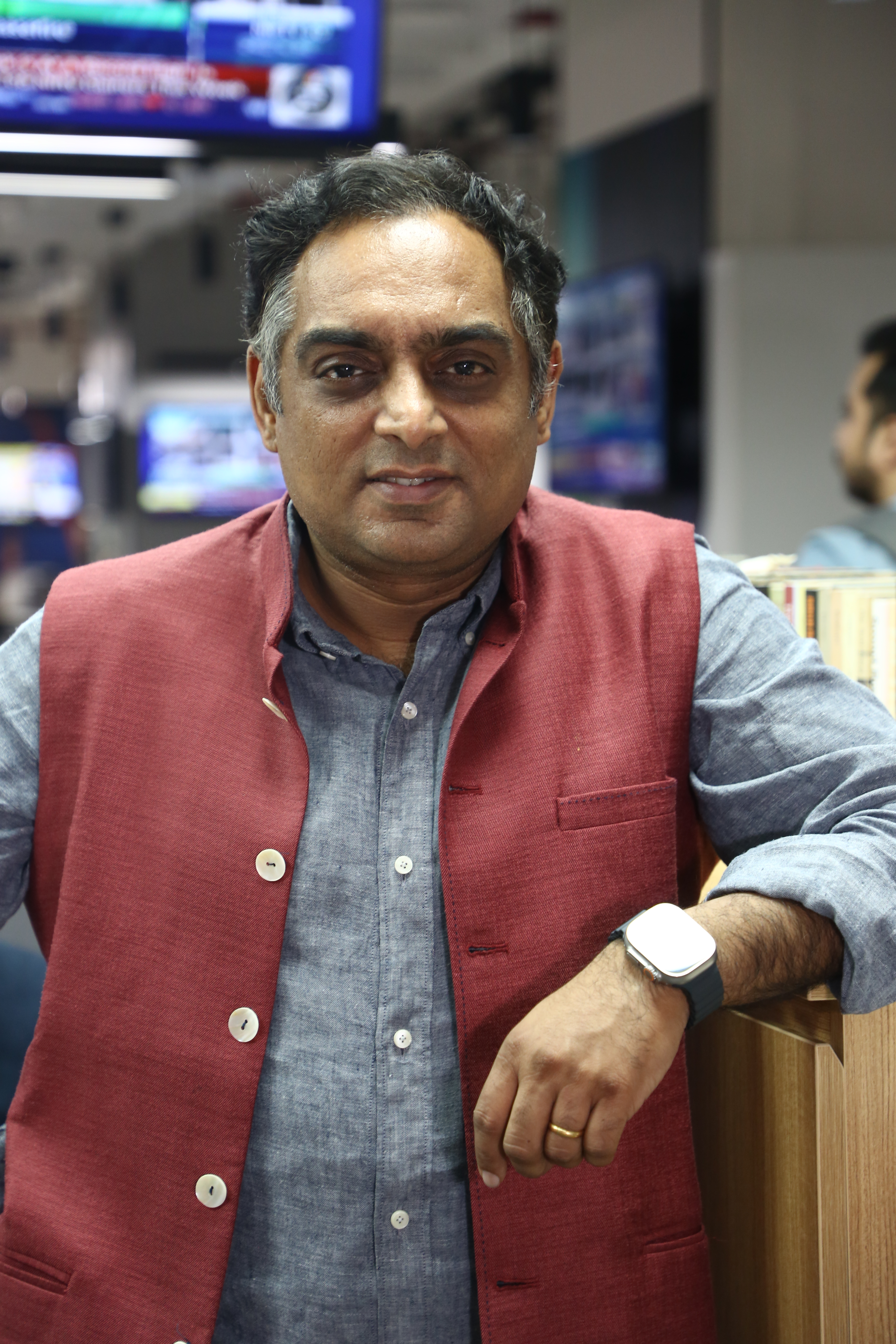
- Born: 7 June 1978 (age 48)
- Occupations: Journalist and Political Scientist
- Known for: Political and social analysis. Books on politics, technology, sport history.

Academic background
- Education: Ph.D, La Trobe University, Melbourne, Australia. MA in International Relations, University of East Anglia, UK BA (Honours) Journalism from University of Delhi. Studied at The Scindia School, Gwalior.

Academic work
- Notable works: The New BJP, India's Techade, Behind a Billion Screens, India on Television, Dreams of a Billion
- Website: https://nalinmehta.in/

Professor Nalin Mehta is an Indian political scientist, journalist and writer - serving as Managing Editor of Moneycontrol since December, 2023 as well as Chief AI Officer at Network 18 since May, 2025.

He is the author of notable books on Indian political economy, technology and sport history. These include The New BJP: Modi and the Making of the World's Largest Political Party which has been called a "seminal", non-partisan revisionist account of the rise of the BJP in India. Some of the world's leading scholars on India have called it a "classic", praising it as an "indispensable" and "masterful account" of the rise of the BJP.

As per the New York Times, 'The New BJP' showed how Modi and BJP's growth after 2014 resulted from an expansion of the party's traditional power base beyond Hindu nationalism to new voters - across caste, class and gender. Much of this was because of targeted and "direct digital welfare payments," the wooing of previously marginalised caste groups and meshing of technology with politics. A significant part of this growth was due to the creation of "a new kind of welfare state," as the Wall Street Journal noted.

Mehta's book shows how the party overtook the Chinese Communist Party as the world's largest political organisation by broadening its appeal beyond its erstwhile small base of city-based upper-caste voters through welfare programmes, the creation of a new class of 'labharthees' (benefeciaries) and outreach to women.

The book ignited a major debate on Indian politics and caste - with new caste data in the book challenging and disproving caste data and research by the French scholar Christophe Jaffrelot, the Belgian scholar Giles Verniers and Ashoka University's Trivedi Centre for Political Data. About a year after the new caste data - collated in The New BJP's Mehta-Singh Index - pointed out significant flaws in the Trivedi Centre's data, Ashoka University closed it as an entity. It merged the Centre with another body even as Trivedi Centre's scientific board wrote an open letter of protest claiming that its director, Verniers was 'forced out'.

Books

Mehta's books on tech include 'India’s Techade: Digital Revolution and Change in the World's Largest Democracy' which, according to The New Yorker, argues that India's digital revolution is “unlike any that came before,” went “viral on a scale that is unprecedented” and that India’s digital stack "may ultimately shape the future of the Internet far more significantly than the efforts of Western regulators."

His earlier book, 'Behind a Billion Screens: What Television Tells Us About Modern India', was long-listed for Business Book of the Year by Tata Literary Live 2015 and a national non-fiction bestseller.

Mehta's first book India on Television was widely acclaimed as a seminal, "impeccably researched" and "authoritative scholarly study" of the politics and business of television in India, and won the Asian Publishing Award for Best Book in 2009.

JioStar Vice Chairman and former Star India CEO Uday Shankar has called Mehta "probably the best media academic in India" and the media guru Robin Jeffrey has described his work as "remarkable for being both a distinguished academic and an experienced journalist".

On sports history, he has co-authored 'Dreams of a Billion' (Ekamra Sports Book of the Year 2022), 'Olympics: The India Story', 'Sellotape Legacy' and 'The Changing Face of Cricket' (co-ed). A social history of Indian sport, Olympics: The India Story, was welcomed as a "pioneering, long-awaited" work of history in the press and as a "triumph of Olympian proportions". India's most well-known sociologist Ashis Nandy called it "the first comprehensive, scholarly and yet lively account of India's experiences with the Olympics".

He has also co-authored Sellotape Legacy, a detailed account of the politics, economics, and disaster of the Delhi Commonwealth Games in 2010. Former Indian sports minister Mani Shankar Aiyar called it a "blazing expose" and a "thorough, well-researched, sober, and absorbingly well-written indictment of Everything You Wanted to Know about CWG [Commonwealth Games] but were Afraid to Ask."

Mehta's other work includes Gujarat Beyond Gandhi, a jointly edited anthology of critical essays that looked at 60 years of politics and social change in Gujarat, and 'Television in India,

Media and Academia

A multi-platform journalist, Nalin Mehta has led digital, print and TV platforms. He has served as an international civil servant with the UN and the Global Fund in Geneva, Switzerland and taught at universities and institutions in Australia (ANU, La Trobe University), Singapore (NUS), Switzerland (International Olympic Museum) and India (Shiv Nadar University, IIM Bangalore).

Between 2021-23, he served as Dean and Professor at the School of Modern Media, UPES University, Dehradun. He has earlier been Group Consulting Editor, Network 18; Executive Editor, The Times of India Online, managing editor, India Today (English TV news channel) and consulting editor of The Times of India. He has also been associate professor at Shiv Nadar University where he taught courses on political economy, the Indian polity and the digital media businesses; a founding editor of the international journal and book series South Asian History and Culture. and founding co-director of the Times LitFest Delhi

== Early career ==
Mehta worked for NDTV as a correspondent and anchor. At NDTV, he covered the 2002 Gujarat violence and subsequent elections, the 2001 Gujarat earthquake, the assassination of the royal family in Kathmandu and several Indian state elections including in Chhattisgarh and Punjab. He then moved to Australia for a doctoral degree in political science; worked in Geneva, Switzerland, with UNAIDS and the Global Fund and also spent time as a Senior Fellow at Institute of South Asian Studies and Asia Research Institute at National University of Singapore for several years before returning to India.

== Education ==
Mehta studied at the Scindia School, where he finished as school captain and editor of the Scindia School Review. A Commonwealth-DFID scholar, he earned a Master of Arts in international relations from the University of East Anglia where he studied as a DFID Commonwealth scholar and a PhD in political science from La Trobe University in Melbourne.

== Awards and recognition ==
- Asian Publishing Award for Best Book on Asian Media/Society for India on Television, 2009.
- Government of Australia Alumni Excellence Award for Media and Entertainment, 2010.
- Long-listed for Tata Literary Live Best Business Book of the Year, 2015, for Behind a Billion Screens: What Television Tells Us About Modern India

== Books ==
- The New BJP: Modi and the Making of the World's Largest Political Party (Westland Books, 2022; Routledge, London/New York: 2025)
- India's Techade: India’s Techade: Digital Revolution and Change in the World’s Largest Democracy (Westland, 2023)

Amazon.in

- Dreams of a Billion: India and the Olympic Games, (HarperCollins, 2020)
- Behind a Billion Screens: What Television Tells Us About Modern India, (HarperCollins, 2015), "Longlisted for Business Book of the Year by Tata Literary Live, national non-fiction bestseller"
- India on Television: How Satellite TV Has Changed the Way We Think and Act (HarperCollins, 2008). Winner of Asian Publishing Award 2009 for Best Book
- Sellotape Legacy: Delhi and the Commonwealth Games 2010, with Boria Majumdar (Harper Collins, 2010).
- Olympics: The India Story, with Boria Majumdar (Harper Collins, 2008, 2012), republished as India and the Olympics (Routledge, 2009)
- Television in India: Satellites, Politics and Cultural Change (Editor. Routledge, 2008, 2009)
- Gujarat Beyond Gandhi: Politics, Conflict and Society, with Mona G. Mehta (Editor. Routledge, 2010, 2011).
- The Changing Face of Cricket: From Imperial to Global Game, with Dominic Malcolm & Jon Gemmell (Editor. Routledge, 2010).
