= Azadpur =

- Neighbourhood
- Location in Delhi, India
- Coordinates: 28°42′47″N 77°10′36″E
- Country: India
- State: Delhi
- District: North Delhi

Languages
  - Official: Hindi, English,Bhojpuri
- Time zone: UTC+5:30 (IST)
- PIN: 110 054
- Lok Sabha constituency: North Delhi
- Civic agency: MCD

Azadpur is a neighbourhood in Delhi, India, and one of the districts located in North Delhi. The district is surrounded by adjacent localities like Model Town, Kingsway Camp, Guru Tegh Bahadur Nagar, and Shalimar Bagh. It falls under the parliamentary constituency of Adarsh Nagar.

The Azadpur Mandi, located in Azadpur, is a local grocery market and is considered as the largest vegetable and fruit market in Asia.

== Public transportation ==
The Azadpur metro station of Delhi Metro's Yellow and Pink Lines is the nearest metro station. Apart from it, DTC buses and Delhi Metro Feeder Buses are available here via the DTC Azadpur Terminal for its nearby locations. Azadpur has a railway station of Northern Railways for suburban and inter-state travels also.
