= New Delhi district =

- District
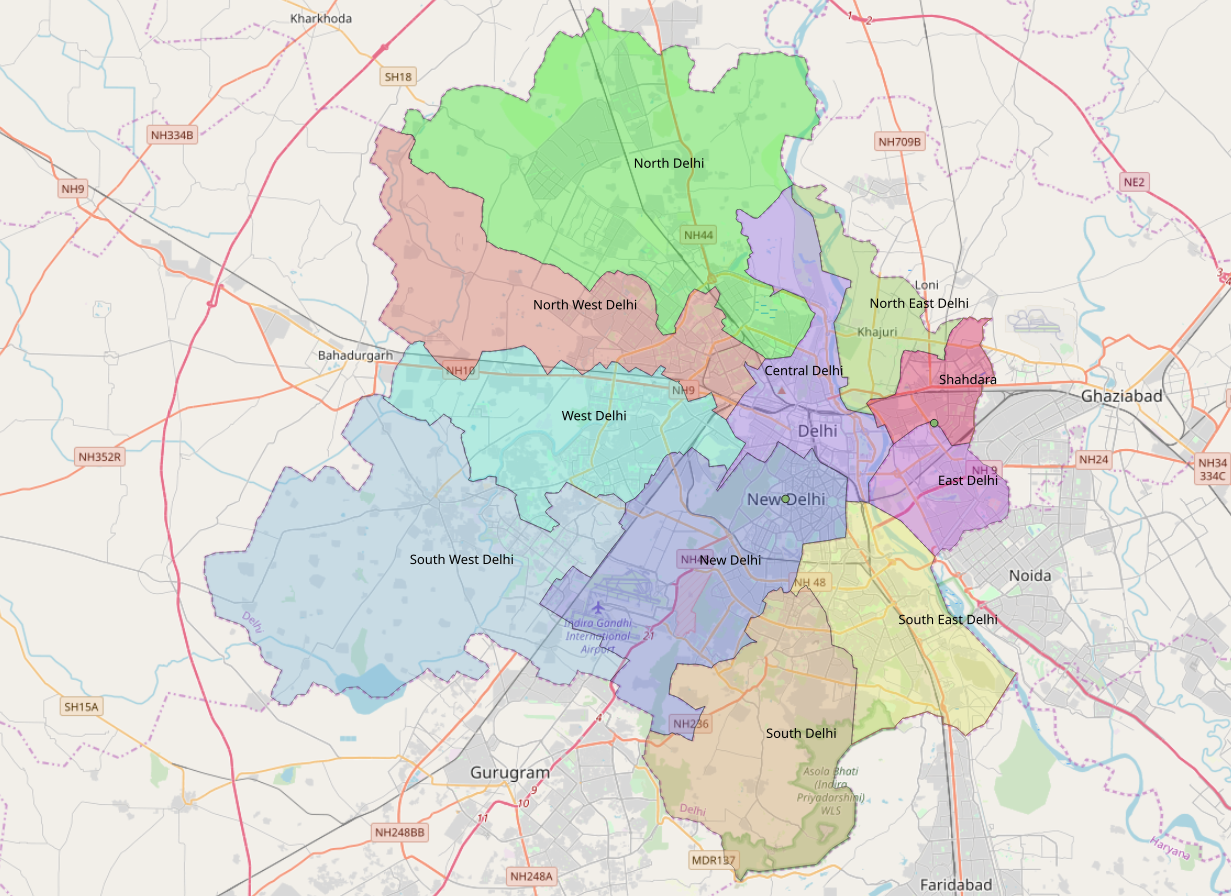
- Location in Delhi, India
- Coordinates: 28.6140°N 77.2089°E
- Country: India
- Union Territory: Delhi
- Headquarters: New Delhi

Government
  - District collector: Sunny Kumar Singh, IAS
  - DCP: Sachin Sharma IPS

Languages
  - Official: Hindi, English
- Time zone: UTC+5:30 (IST)
- Nearest city: New Delhi
- Website: dmnewdelhi.delhi.gov.in

New Delhi district is an administrative district of Delhi in India. Its district headquarters is New Delhi. It is named after New Delhi, the capital of India, located within its borders, and is in its entirety a part of the Delhi megacity. The district was founded in 1997, but its borders significantly changed during the redrawing of the Delhi districts in 2012.

== Geography ==
The New Delhi district spans over all three municipalities of the National Capital Territory (NCT) of Delhi, namely New Delhi Municipal Council, the Delhi Cantonment and parts of the Municipal Corporation of Delhi area. It covers the centrally located Lutyens' Delhi and reaches all the way to the NCT's southwestern borders to Gurugram. As the other 10 districts of the NCT, it is subdivided into three tehsils: Chanakyapuri, Delhi Cantonment and Vasant Vihar.

== History ==
Historical population
Year	Pop.	±% p.a.
1961	143,846	—
1971	164,702	+1.36%
1981	144,115	−1.33%
1991	168,669	+1.59%
2001	179,112	+0.60%
2011	142,004	−2.29%

The New Delhi district was founded in mid 1990s, when the former single district of the NCT was split into 9 districts. In its then borders, the district covered 35 km².

When the borders of the districts of Delhi were redrawn in 2012, the New Delhi district became significantly bigger, now spanning all the way to the border to the neighboring state of Haryana.

== See also ==
- Civil Services Examination
- Indian Administrative Service
- Union Public Service Commission
