= 2022 Municipal Corporation of Delhi election =

Municipal Corporation election in Delhi, India

- 4 December 2022

All 250 seats of the Municipal Corporation of Delhi 126 seats needed for a majority
- Turnout: 50.48% (▼3.10%)
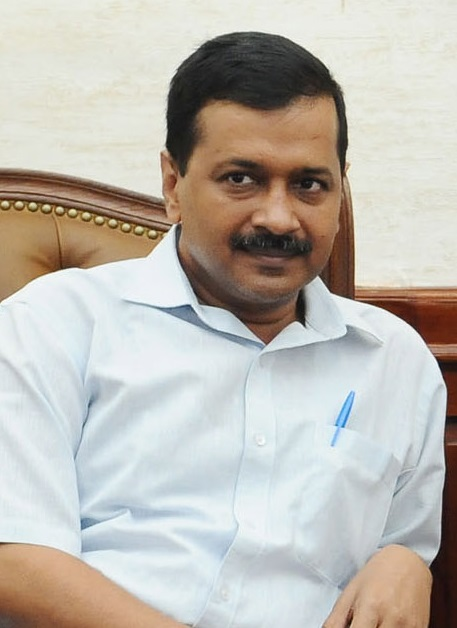

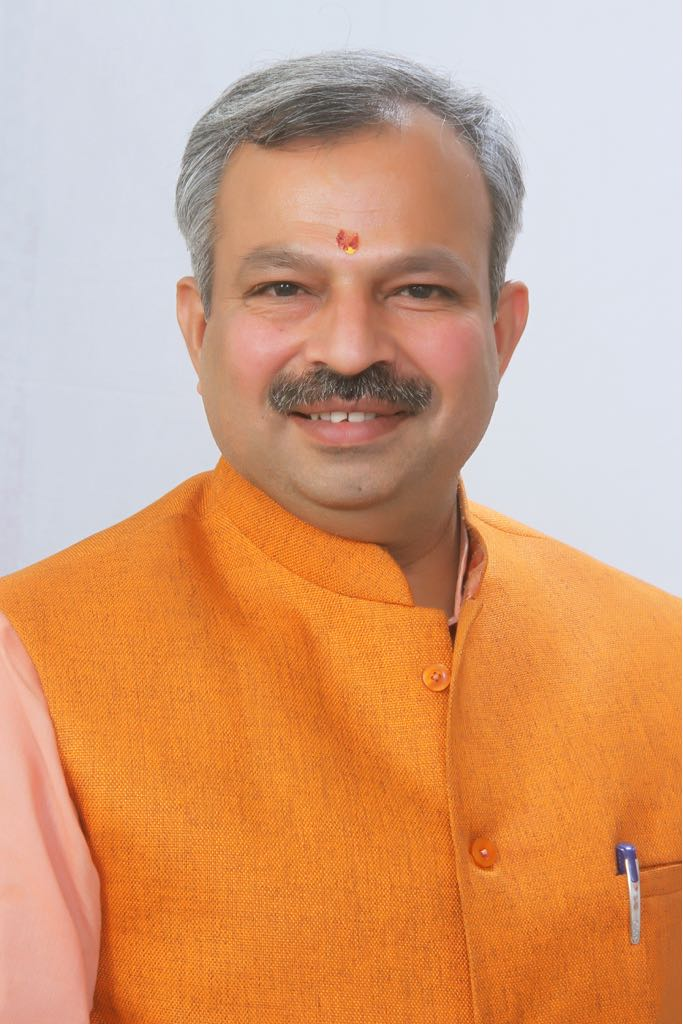

	Majority party	Minority party	Third party
Leader	Arvind Kejriwal	Adesh Kumar Gupta	Anil Chaudhary
Party	AAP	BJP	INC
Alliance	None	NDA	UPA
Leader since	2012	2020	2020
Last election	26.23%, 49 seats (Note: 21 seats in NDMC, 16 seats in SDMC and 12 seats in EDMC)	36.08%, 181 seats (Note: 64 seats in NDMC, 70 seats in SDMC and 47 seats in EDMC)	21.09%, 31 seats (Note: 16 seats in NDMC, 12 seats in SDMC, 3 seats in EDMC)
Seats before	51	163	22
Seats won	134	104	9
Seat change	▲85	▼59	▼13
Percentage	42.05%	39.09%	11.68%
Swing	▲15.82%	▲3.01%	▼9.41%
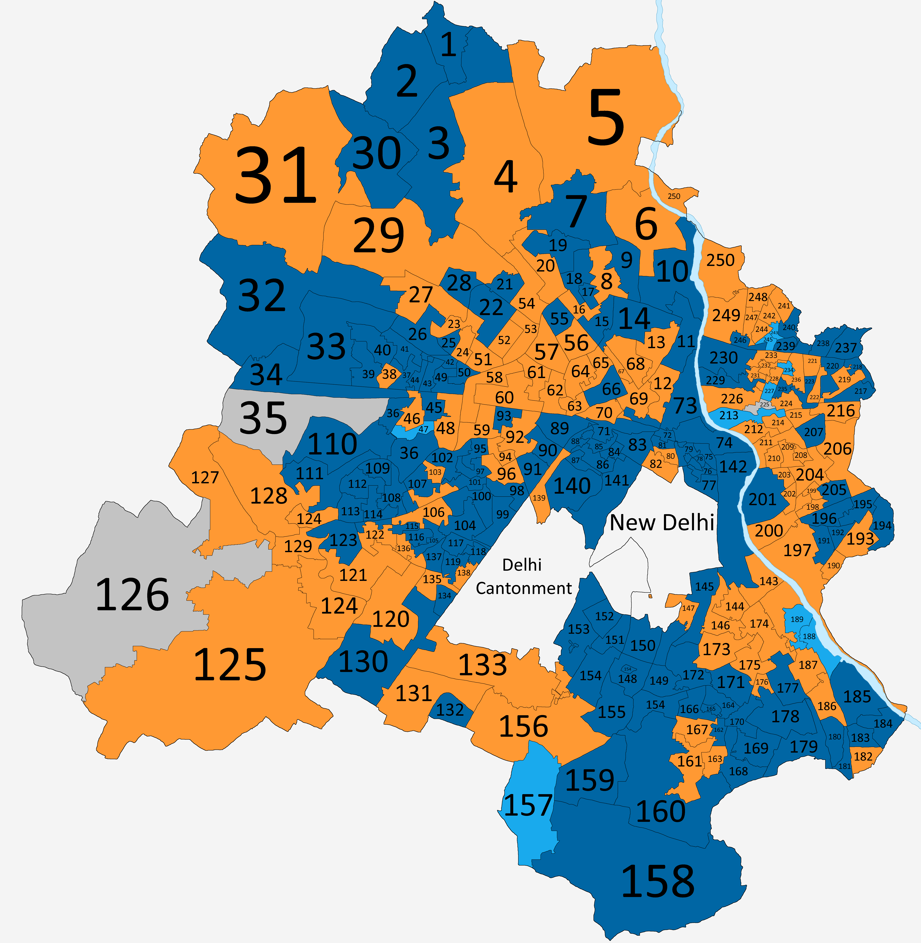
- Map depicting the winning party for each ward

MCD majority before election
NDMC - BJP
SDMC - BJP
EDMC - BJP
Elected MCD majority
AAP

Municipal elections were held in Delhi on 4 December 2022 to elect 250 councillors of the Municipal Corporation of Delhi. The counting of the votes and declaration of results took place on 7 December 2022.

This was the maiden election to the municipal corporation since its reunification in May 2022.

== Background ==
The tenure of the North Delhi Municipal Corporation, South Delhi Municipal Corporation, and East Delhi Municipal Corporation concluded on 18 May 2022. The previous municipal elections were held in April 2017 to elect the councillors of the three municipal corporations.

=== Re-merger of municipal corporations ===
In March 2022, the Delhi State Election Commission indefinitely deferred the municipal elections that were scheduled to be held in April 2022. On 22 March, the Union Government approved the Delhi Municipal Corporation (Amendment) Bill to re-merge the three municipal corporations into a unified body. The unified Municipal Corporation of Delhi formally came into existence from 22 May 2022.

== Events ==
The State Election Commission in Delhi had been preparing for the Delhi Municipal Elections and had issued multiple notices, notifications, and orders indicating that the election was scheduled to take place in April 2022.

On March 9, 2022, the Delhi State Election Commission announced a press conference at 5 PM to release the schedule for the municipal elections planned for April. However, shortly after this announcement, the commission received an unofficial communication from the Lieutenant Governor of Delhi, Anil Baijal, indicating that the Union Government intended to merge the three municipal bodies. This raises critical concerns about the transparency and timing of the communication, as it suggests potential political interference or a lack of coordination between the Union Government and the State Election Commission, undermining the autonomy of the electoral process. No formal communication was issued regarding the merger plans, nor was any such agenda disclosed during the ongoing budget session of the Parliament of India. Following the informal communication from the Lieutenant Governor of Delhi, the press conference to announce the election schedule was indefinitely postponed, and the elections were deferred. This sequence of events raises serious questions about the procedural integrity and transparency of the decision-making process, as well as the timing and legitimacy of the intervention.

Delhi Chief Minister Arvind Kejriwal accused the BJP, the ruling party of India, of using the unification of municipal bodies as a pretext to delay the elections. He remarked, "Can they cancel civic polls for this reason? If they can use such excuses to postpone a minor election, what’s to stop them from delaying state and national elections in the future?"

=== Delimitation exercise ===
The Delhi Municipal Corporation (Amendment) Bill, 2022 proposed reducing the number of councillor seats from the existing 272 to a maximum of 250. A three-member delimitation committee was established on July 8, 2022, with a mandate to complete its work and submit a report within four months of its formation. The committee, led by State Election Commissioner Vijay Dev, was tasked with determining ward boundaries based on specific guidelines.

The average ward size was set at approximately 65,000 people, with each assembly constituency divided into a minimum of three wards. While the principle of maintaining an average population per ward was emphasised, deviations of up to plus or minus 10% were deemed acceptable by the Union Government.

The total population of the corporation, as per the 2011 census, was to be divided by the total number of wards to calculate the average population per ward. Additionally, the number of seats reserved for Scheduled Castes was required to reflect the proportion of the Scheduled Caste population to the total population of Delhi.

To ensure accuracy, the delimitation commission utilised digitised maps provided by Geospatial Delhi Limited (GSDL).

=== Lawsuit to conduct the election ===
The Aam Aadmi Party (AAP) filed a petition with the Supreme Court, seeking directives for the State Election Commission to conduct a fair and timely election without interference from the Union Government. The plea, submitted by AAP leaders Ankush Narang and Manoj Kumar Tyagi, requested that the elections be held as per the State Election Commission's original schedule, ensuring they take place before the term of the municipal corporations concluded in May.

The plea argued, "The elections have been postponed at the eleventh hour based solely on an informal intimation to the State Election Commission. The commission, established as an independent constitutional authority, is meant to be insulated from political whims and caprices to ensure the conduct of free, fair, and timely elections. Such an arbitrary and sudden alteration of the election schedule, solely at the behest of the government, constitutes a blatant violation of the fundamental democratic principle of impartial election conduct." It further described the incident as a "brazen display of influence by the Government of India over the State Election Commission and an egregious interference in the conduct of municipal elections." The plea accused the Union Government of undermining the commission's independence, asserting that its intervention was the sole reason for the election delay.

AAP criticized the indefinite deferral of the elections as completely arbitrary and questioned the court whether elections, already scheduled and prepared for, could be postponed based on unofficial communications made "at the whim of the Central Government."

==== State Election Commission response ====
On March 23, The Indian Express reported, citing unnamed sources, that the State Election Commission had sought legal advice on whether elections could proceed amidst the Union Government's plans to unify the municipal corporations. According to the report, the legal advisors recommended that the commission wait until the ongoing parliamentary session concluded before making a decision. Consequently, the commission was expected to finalise its stance on the elections in the second week of April. The report also highlighted the possibility of ward reorganization in Delhi, which could further delay the elections.

=== Lawsuit demanding the use of a voting machine with paper trail ===
In March 2022, the Aam Aadmi Party (AAP) requested that the authorities conducting the elections use Electronic Voting Machines (EVMs) compatible with Voter Verifiable Paper Audit Trail (VVPAT) systems. In response, the State Election Commission of Delhi stated that it had decided to conduct the 2022 MCD elections using second-generation M-2 EVMs, which do not support VVPAT.

A petition was filed in the Delhi High Court by Aam Aadmi Party MLA Saurabh Bhardwaj, seeking a directive for the State Election Commission of Delhi to conduct the MCD elections using Electronic Voting Machines (EVMs) equipped with Voter Verifiable Paper Audit Trail (VVPAT) systems. His legal counsel argued that without VVPAT machines, verifying the accuracy of the EVMs was nearly impossible, and the possibility of tampering could not be ruled out.

In Subramanian Swamy vs. Election Commission of India (2013), the Supreme Court of India recognised the inclusion of a paper trail system in Electronic Voting Machines (EVMs) as essential for ensuring free and fair elections. The petition filed by AAP criticised the State Election Commission's decision to use older second-generation M-2 EVMs without Voter Verifiable Paper Audit Trail (VVPAT) as a direct violation of the Supreme Court's directions, terming it "manifestly wrong" and a "colourable exercise of power." The petition further argued that this decision raised "genuine apprehensions about the sanctity of the entire electoral process."

The petition stated, "There are no assembly elections scheduled anywhere in the country after March 7, 2022. Therefore, there should be no impediment in loaning the newer generation EVMs, which are compatible with VVPAT, to the State Election Commission of Delhi for conducting the 2022 MCD elections."

The State Election Commission of Delhi stated that it relied on the Election Commission of India (ECI) for the supply of Electronic Voting Machines (EVMs). The ECI had provided M-2 EVMs, which do not support Voter Verifiable Paper Audit Trail (VVPAT), to the SEC. In court, the SEC of Delhi clarified that it had no objections to using EVMs with VVPAT if the ECI supplied them.

The Election Commission of India (ECI) opposed the plea in court, stating that it could not provide EVMs equipped with VVPAT to the State Election Commission (SEC). The ECI argued that these machines were designated for elections under its supervision and could not be allocated to agencies outside its direct oversight.

AAP argued in court that the EVMs procured by the State Election Commission (SEC) were not compatible with VVPAT and requested the disclosure of the total number of VVPAT-compatible machines available in India. In response, the High Court directed the SEC to clarify which of its procured EVMs were compatible with VVPAT. The court granted the SEC ten days to respond, with the next hearing scheduled for April 29.

== Schedule ==
The election schedule was announced by the Delhi State Election Commission on 4 November 2022.

Poll Event	Date
Notification date	7 November 2022
Last date for filing nomination	14 November 2022
Date for scrutiny of nominations	16 November 2022
Last date for withdrawal of candidatures	19 November 2022
Date of Poll	4 December 2022
Date of Counting	7 December 2022

== Parties and alliances ==
=== Aam Aadmi Party ===
No.	Party	Flag	Symbol	Leader	Photo	Seats Contested
1.	Aam Aadmi Party			Arvind Kejriwal		250

=== National Democratic Alliance ===
No.	Party	Flag	Symbol	Leader	Photo	Seats Contested
1.	Bharatiya Janata Party			Adesh Kumar Gupta		250

=== United Progressive Alliance ===
No.	Party	Flag	Symbol	Leader	Seats Contested
1.	Indian National Congress			Anil Chaudhary	247

=== Left Front ===
No.	Party	Flag	Symbol	Seats contested
1.	Communist Party of India (Marxist)			6
2.	Communist Party of India (Marxist–Leninist) Liberation			5
3.	Communist Party of India			3
4.	All India Forward Bloc			3

=== Others ===
No.	Party	Flag	Symbol	Leader	Seats Contested
1.	Bahujan Samaj Party			C. P. Singh	132
2.	Nationalist Congress Party			Yoganand Shastri	26
3.	Janata Dal (United)			Satya Prakash Mishra	22
4.	All India Majlis-e-Ittehadul Muslimeen			Kaleemul Hafeez	15

== Candidates ==
AAP released the first list of 134 candidates on 11 November 2022. The second list of 117 candidates was released on 12 November 2022 wherein one candidate from the first list was replaced.

BJP released the first list of 232 candidates on 12 November 2022. The second list of 18 candidates was released on 14 November 2022. BJP replaced 7 candidates on 14 November 2022.

Congress released the first list of 249 candidates on 13 November 2022. The list of candidates for the remaining seat, along with replacements for three candidates from the first list, was released on November 14, 2022. Nominations of three Congress candidates was rejected during scrutiny.

== Exit polls ==
Polling firm/Commissioner					Lead	Remarks
Polling firm/Commissioner	AAP	BJP	INC	Others	Lead	Remarks
Aaj Tak-Axis My India	149-171	69-91	3-7	5-9	58-102	AAP majority
Zee News-BARC	134-146	82-94	8-14	14-19	40-64	AAP majority
Times Now-Navbharat	146-156	84-94	6-10	0-4	52-72	AAP majority
NewsX-Navbharat	159-172	70-92	4-7	0-1	67-102	AAP majority
Poll of polls (Average)	154	84	6	6	70	AAP majority
Actual result	134	104	9	3	30	AAP majority

== Results ==
134	104	9	3
AAP	BJP	INC	IND

Vote Share of different parties in the election.
1. AAP (42.0%)
2. BJP (39.1%)
3. INC (11.7%)
4. BSP (1.80%)
5. IND (3.46%)
6. NOTA (0.78%)
7. Other (1.14%)

=== Results by Party ===
Results were announced on 7 December 2022.

Parties	Popular vote			Seats		
Parties	Votes	%	± %	Contested	Won	+/-
Aam Aadmi Party	3,084,957	42.05	▲15.82	250	134	▲85
Bharatiya Janata Party	2,867,472	39.09	▲3.01	250	104	▼77
Indian National Congress	856,593	11.68	▼9.41	247	9	▼22
Independent	253,631	3.46			3	▼3
Others	215,627	2.94			0	▼5
NOTA	57,545	0.78				
Total	7,335,825	100			250	

=== Result by ward ===
Ward		Winner			Runner Up			Margin
#	Name	Candidate	Party	Votes	Candidate	Party	Votes	Margin
1	Narela (W)	Sweta Khatri	AAP	15,929	Keshrani Khatri	BJP	10,960	4,969
2	Bankner	Dinesh Kumar	AAP	10,765	Vinod Bhardwaj	BJP	10,387	378
3	Holambi Kalan (W)	Neha Mishra	AAP	15,631	Archana	BJP	7,490	8,141
4	Alipur	Yogesh Rana	BJP	14,929	Deep Kumar	AAP	14,838	91
5	Bakhtawarpur (W)	Janta Devi	BJP	12,754	Babita	AAP	10,570	2,184
6	Burari	Anil Kumar Tyagi	BJP	18,314	Ashish Tyagi	AAP	18,141	173
7	Kadipur (W)	Munesh Devi	AAP	19,172	Urmila Rana	BJP	14,669	4,503
8	Mukundpur	Gulab Singh Rathore	BJP	15,687	Ajay Kumar	AAP	14,929	758
9	Sant Nagar (W)	Ruby Rawat	AAP	15,332	Rekha Rawat	BJP	12,289	3,043
10	Jharoda	Gagan Chaudhary	AAP	24,626	Brijesh Kumar Rai	BJP	19,810	4,816
11	Timarpur (W)	Promila Gupta	AAP	17,336	Amarlata Sangwan	BJP	11,975	5,361
12	Malka Ganj (SC-W)	Rekha Jatav	BJP	13,855	Guddi Devi	AAP	13,373	482
13	Mukherjee Nagar	Raja Iqbal Singh	BJP	14,422	Antul Kohli	AAP	13,845	577
14	Dhirpur (W)	Neha Aggarwal	AAP	13,269	Neelam Budhiraja	BJP	11,148	2,121
15	Adarsh Nagar	Mukesh Goel	AAP	12,786	Anubhav Dhir	BJP	12,599	187
16	Azadpur (W)	Suman Kumari	BJP	13,316	Mannu	AAP	9,779	3,537
17	Bhalswa	Ajeet Singh Yadav	AAP	10,316	Lallu Singh	BJP	9,230	1,086
18	Jahangir Puri (W)	Timsy Sharma	AAP	11,086	Divya Jha	BJP	9,898	1,188
19	Sarup Nagar	Joginder Singh Rana	AAP	11,865	Suresh Pandey	BJP	10,934	931
20	Samaypur Badli (W)	Gayatri Yadav	BJP	12,019	Seema Yadav	INC	8,487	3,532
21	Rohini-A	Pardeep Mittal	AAP	14,574	Naveen Garg	BJP	13,786	788
22	Rohini-B (W)	Suman Anil Rana	AAP	11,837	Komal Vashisht	BJP	11,525	312
23	Rithala	Narender Kumar	BJP	15,053	Shubham Kumar Tripathi	AAP	12,029	3,024
24	Vijay Vihar (W)	Pooshpa Solanki	AAP	17,095	Kumari Amrita	BJP	14,152	2,943
25	Budh Vihar	Amrit Jain	AAP	11,976	Rajpal Garg	BJP	9,301	2,675
26	Pooth Kalan (W)	Ritu Kumar	AAP	16,074	Kavita Solanki	BJP	14,778	1,296
27	Begumpur	Jai Bhagwan Yadav	BJP	15,575	Dharmender Kumar	AAP	13,507	2,068
28	Shahbaad Dairy (SC)	Ram Chander	AAP	10,155	Santosh Kumar Bharti	BJP	7,023	3,132
29	Pooth Khurd (W)	Anju Devi	BJP	13,016	Umindera Devi	AAP	11,522	1,494
30	Bawana	Pawan Kumar	AAP	10,564	Braham Prakash	BJP	9,930	724
31	Nangal Thakran (W)	Babita Dabas	BJP	11,661	Manisha Shokeen	AAP	9,506	2,155
32	Kanjhawala	Sandeep Dabas	AAP	8,532	Ravinder	IND	6,506	2,026
33	Rani Khera (W)	Manisha Jasbir Karala	AAP	18,366	Sushila	BJP	16,012	2,354
34	Nangloi (SC-W)	Hemlata ladla	AAP	13,644	Babita Kumari	BJP	10,544	3,100
35	Mundka	Gajendra Singh Daral	IND	15,492	Anil	AAP	6,144	9,348
36	Nilothi (W)	Babina Shokeen	AAP	14,658	Kuljeet Kaur	BJP	9,538	5,126
37	Kirari	Ramesh Chand	AAP	11,087	Urmila Choudhary	BJP	6,355	4,732
38	Prem Nagar (W)	Neela Kumari	BJP	14,537	Munni Devi	AAP	10,012	4,525
39	Mubarikpur	Rajesh Kumar	AAP	16,832	Ramdayal Mahto	BJP	13,757	3,075
40	Nithari (W)	Mamta Gupta	AAP	11,299	Sona Choudhary	BJP	10,524	775
41	Aman Vihar	Ravinder Bharadwaj	AAP	12,196	Narender Kumar	BJP	11,474	722
42	Mangol Puri (SC)	Rajesh Kumar	AAP	12,320	Shashi Kapoor	BJP	10,055	2,265
43	Sultanpuri-A (SC-W)	Bobi om prakash	AAP	14,821	Varuna Dhaka	INC	8,107	6,714
44	Sultanpuri-B (SC)	Daulat pawar	AAP	15,760	Hukum Singh	BJP	10,997	4,763
45	Jawalapuri (SC-W)	Santosh Devi	AAP	13,263	Bimla	BJP	10,360	2,903
46	Nangloi Jat (W)	Poonam Saini	BJP	12,168	Vijay Laxmi	AAP	10,614	1,554
47	Nihal Vihar	Mandeep Singh	INC	12,747	Ashok Bhardwaj	AAP	12,181	566
48	Guru Harkishan Nagar (W)	Monika Goyal	BJP	10,694	Shaveta Khera	AAP	10,319	375
49	Mangolpuri-A (SC)	Dharam Rakshak	AAP	15,171	Ashok Kumar	BJP	11,700	3,471
50	Mangolpuri-B (SC-W)	Suman Rajora	AAP	16,400	Rajeshwari	BJP	9,703	6,697
51	Rohini-C	Dharambir Sharma	BJP	11,969	Anil Mittal	AAP	11,246	723
52	Rohini-F (W)	Ritu Goel	BJP	17,302	Rekha Goel	AAP	10,021	7,281
53	Rohini-E	Pravesh Wahi	BJP	15,881	Kuldip Mittal	AAP	7,846	8,035
54	Rohini-D (W)	Smita Kaushik	BJP	15,584	Anupriya Mishra	AAP	13,696	1,888
55	Shalimar Bagh-A	Jalaj Kumar	AAP	11,553	Sujeet Thakur	BJP	8,768	2,785
56	Shalimar Bagh-B (W)	Rekha Gupta	BJP	19,447	Ishupreet Kaur Gujral	AAP	11,457	7,990
57	Pitam Pura	Amit Nagpal	BJP	17,191	Sanju Jain	AAP	13,366	3,825
58	Saraswati Vihar (W)	Shikha Bhardwaj	BJP	13,167	Urmila Gupta	AAP	10,017	3,150
59	Paschim Vihar	Vineet Vohra	BJP	12,199	Shalu Duggal	AAP	10,155	2,044
60	Rani Bagh (W)	Jyoti Aggarwal	BJP	10,346	Mithlesh Pathak	AAP	8,959	1,387
61	Kohat Enclave	Ajay Ravi Hans	BJP	15,195	N. Raja	AAP	10,549	4,646
62	Shakur Pur (SC)	Kishan Lal	BJP	12,265	Ashok Kumar	AAP	12,161	104
63	Tri Nagar (W)	Meenu Goel	BJP	13,900	Neetu Yadav	AAP	8,597	5,303
64	Keshav Puram	Yogesh Verma	BJP	12,200	Vikas Goel	AAP	9,804	2,396
65	Ashok Vihar (W)	Poonam Sharma	BJP	9,995	Reeta Khari	AAP	9,839	156
66	Wazir Pur (SC-W)	Chitra Vidyarthi	AAP	15,987	Sonia	BJP	13,291	2,696
67	Sangam Park (SC)	Sushil kumar	BJP	7,039	Ravi Shankar	AAP	6,809	230
68	Model Town	Vikesh Sethi	BJP	13,896	Nathu Ram Nagar	AAP	12,069	1,827
69	Kamla Nagar (W)	Renu Aggarwal	BJP	14,144	Kiran Gupta Sethi	AAP	9,795	4,349
70	Shastri Nagar	Manoj Kumar Jindal	BJP	23,413	Babita	AAP	11,204	12,209
71	Kishan Ganj (SC-W)	Pooja Malk	AAP	13,728	Geeta Devi	BJP	10,256	3,472
72	Sadar Bazar (W)	Usha Sharma	AAP	13,770	Pinki Jain	BJP	9,037	4,733
73	Civil Lines (SC)	Vikas Tank	AAP	12,498	Avtar Singh	BJP	5,545	6,953
74	Chandni Chowk	Punardeep Singh Sawhney	AAP	8,774	Ravinder Kumar	BJP	7,558	1,216
75	Jama Masjid (W)	Sultana Abaid	AAP	11,216	Shahin Parveen	INC	3,793	7,423
76	Chandani Mahal	Aaley Mohammad Iqbal	AAP	19,199	Mohammad Hamid	INC	2,065	17,134
77	Delhi Gate (SC-W)	Kiran Bala	AAP	8,866	Deepti Arora	BJP	7,075	1,791
78	Bazar Sita Ram (W)	Rafia Mahir	AAP	16,639	Seema Tahira	INC	3,753	12,886
79	Ballimaran	Mohammad Sadiq	AAP	15,773	Ram Dev Sharma	BJP	4,147	11,626
80	Ram Nagar (SC)	Kamal Bagri	BJP	12,589	Dharmender Kumar	AAP	10,255	2,334
81	Quraish Nagar (W)	Shamim Bano	AAP	14,853	Samina Raza	BJP	6,643	7,940
82	Pahar Ganj	Manish Chadda	BJP	14,242	Amar Nath	AAP	11,183	3,059
83	Karol Bagh (SC-W)	Urmila Devi	AAP	15,108	Usha Lawaria	BJP	9,111	5,997
84	Dev Nagar (SC)	Mahesh Kumar	AAP	17,253	Ghan Shyam	BJP	10,508	6,745
85	West Patel Nagar (SC-W)	Kavita Chauhan	AAP	15,782	Meenu	BJP	10,466	5,316
86	East Patel Nagar (W)	Shelly Oberoi	AAP	9,987	Deepali Kapoor	BJP	9,718	269
87	Ranjeet Nagar	Ankush Narang	AAP	14,757	Tej Ram Phore	BJP	7,992	6,765
88	Baljeet Nagar (W)	Runakshi Sharma	AAP	10,652	Ayushi Tiwari	BJP	7,061	3,591
89	Karam Pura	Rakesh Joshi	AAP	15,840	Rajiv Girotra	BJP	13,074	2,766
90	Moti Nagar (W)	Alka Dhingra	AAP	12,644	Ritu Madan	BJP	11,980	664
91	Ramesh Nagar	Puneet Rai	AAP	10,115	Pradeep Kumar Tiwari	BJP	9,592	523
92	Punjabi Bagh (W)	Suman Tyagi	BJP	13,497	Sulochana Devi	AAP	11,624	1,873
93	Madipur (SC)	Sahil Gangwal	AAP	10,534	Sant Parkash Gangwal	INC	9,729	625
94	Raghubir Nagar (SC-W)	Urmila Gangwal	BJP	13,911	Pratima Anand	AAP	13,765	146
95	Vishnu Garden	Meenakshi Chandela	AAP	13,791	Sanjay Yadav	BJP	9,784	4,007
96	Rajouri Garden (W)	Shashi Talwar	BJP	13,281	Priya Chandela	AAP	11,362	1,919
97	Chaukhandi Nagar	Sunil Kumar Chadha	AAP	11,780	Suman Kharwal	BJP	8,439	3,341
98	Subhash Nagar (W)	Manju Setia	AAP	14,609	Rekha Sahni	BJP	10,200	4,409
99	Hari Nagar	Rajesh Kumar Ladi	AAP	15,424	Shyam Sharma	BJP	13,535	1,889
100	Fateh Nagar (W)	Raminder Kaur	AAP	11,233	Inder Jit Kaur	BJP	10,389	844
101	Tilak Nagar	Ashok Kumar Maanu	AAP	11,080	Raj Kumar Grover	BJP	9,046	2,034
102	Khyala (W)	Shilpa Kaur	AAP	15,562	Paramjeet Kaur	BJP	7,084	8478
103	Keshopur	Harish Oberroi	BJP	12,092	Sachin Tyagi	AAP	11,916	176
104	Janak Puri South (W)	Dimple Ahuja	AAP	14,408	Akriti Kaur Tapar	BJP	12,984	1,424
105	Mahaveer Enclave	Parveen Kumar	AAP	18,752	Ajit Singh	BJP	15,890	2,862
106	Janak Puri West (W)	Urmila Chawla	BJP	12,994	Geetu	AAP	11,411	1,583
107	Vikas Puri	Sahib Kumar	AAP	17,902	Sunil Jindal	BJP	12,560	5,342
108	Hastsal (W)	Rakhi Yadav	AAP	15,319	Suman Singla	BJP	12,533	2,786
109	Shiv Vihar	Ashok Pandey	AAP	18,527	Pankaj Kumar Singh	BJP	14,919	3,608
110	Bhakkar Wala (W)	Raj Bala	AAP	10,058	Krishna	INC	8,889	1,169
111	Baprola	Ravinder Solanki	AAP	13,099	Satpal Solanki	IND	12,172	927
112	Vikas Nagar (W)	Nirmala Kumari	AAP	20,193	Reeta	BJP	14,001	6,192
113	Mohan Garden-West	Surender Kaushik	AAP	13,420	Shyam Kumar Mishra	BJP	10,138	3,282
114	Mohan Garden-East (W)	Nirmla Devi	AAP	23,173	Rinku	BJP	22,652	521
115	Uttam Nagar	Deepak Vohra	AAP	16,846	Rajesh Aggarwal	BJP	14,846	2,000
116	Binda Pur (W)	Krishna Devi Raghav	AAP	16,620	Sudha Sharma	BJP	10,983	5,637
117	Dabri	Tilotma Choudhary	AAP	16,601	Vinay Kumar Chauhan	BJP	14,891	1,710
118	Sagarpur (W)	Simmi Yadav	AAP	16,217	Poonam Jindal	BJP	14,273	1,944
119	Manglapuri	Narender Kumar	AAP	18,400	Vijay Veer Solanki	BJP	11,220	7,180
120	Dwarka-B (W)	Kamaljeet Sehrawat	BJP	14,782	Sudha Sinha	AAP	7,905	6,877
121	Dwarka-A	Ram Niwas Gehlot	BJP	13,214	Shalini Singh	AAP	11,459	1,755
122	Matiala (W)	Anuradha Ashok Sharma	BJP	15,500	Rajnesh	AAP	14,297	1,203
123	Kakrola	Sudesh Kumar	AAP	17,815	Pawan Tomar	BJP	11,671	6,144
124	Nangli Sakrawati (W)	Savita	BJP	20,717	Geetu	AAP	18,369	2,348
125	Chhawala	Shashi Yadav	BJP	15,246	Jagdish	AAP	10,729	4,517
126	Isapur (W)	Meena Devi	IND	12,782	Pinki Taxat	AAP	10,612	2,170
127	Najafgarh	Amit Kharkhari	BJP	13,998	Rajvir Singh Dabas	AAP	12,954	1,044
128	Dichaon Kalan (W)	Neelam	BJP	22,280	Anita	AAP	11,833	10,447
129	Roshan Pura	Devender	BJP	16,457	Dr Sanjay Parashar	AAP	15,237	1,220
130	Dwarka-C (W)	Sunita	AAP	6,200	Sushma	BJP	5,629	571
131	Bijwasan	Jaivir Singh Rana	BJP	10,571	Narender Rana	AAP	8,719	1,852
132	Kapashera (W)	Aarti Yadav	AAP	4,586	Sunita Devi	BJP	3,102	1,484
133	Mahipalpur	Inderjeet Sherawat	BJP	8,427	Joginder Singh	AAP	8,156	271
134	Raj Nagar (W)	Poonam Bhardwaj	AAP	16,880	Aruna Rawat	BJP	11,432	5,448
135	Palam	Seema Pandit	BJP	11,164	Vishnu Sharma	AAP	10,779	385
136	Madhu Vihar (W)	Sushma Rathee	BJP	19,836	Neha Goswami	AAP	14,401	5,435
137	Mahavir Enclave	Ajay Kumar Rai	AAP	12,780	Raj Kumar	BJP	11,438	1,342
138	Sadh Nagar (W)	Inder Kaur	BJP	13,485	Sangeeta	AAP	11,820	1,665
139	Naraina	Umang Bajaj	BJP	14,246	Vijender Garg	AAP	10,506	3,740
140	Inder Puri (SC)	Jyoti Gautam	AAP	12,404	Mohan Lal	BJP	7,691	4,713
141	Rajinder Nagar (W)	Arti Chawla	AAP	11,016	Manika Nischal	BJP	9,629	1,387
142	Daryaganj	Sarika Chaudhary	AAP	6,700	Farhad Suri	INC	6,456	244
143	Sidhartha Nagar (W)	Sonali	BJP	8,608	Neetu	AAP	8,097	511
144	Lajpat Nagar	Kunwar Arjun Pal Singh Mawrah	BJP	12,728	Subash Malhotra	AAP	9,900	2,828
145	Andrews Ganj (W)	Anita Baisoya	AAP	6,988	Preeti Bidhuri	BJP	6,052	936
146	Amar Colony	Sharad Kapoor	BJP	10,383	Jitender Kumar	AAP	9,112	1,271
147	Kotla Mubarakpur (W)	Kusum Lata	BJP	12,355	Rinku Mittal	AAP	7,805	4,550
148	Hauz Khas	Kamal Bhardwaj	AAP	7,913	Sumitra Dahiya	BJP	6,640	1,273
149	Malviya Nagar (W)	Leena Kumar	AAP	13,773	Nandani Sharma	BJP	10,143	3,630
150	Green Park	Sarita Phogaat	AAP	9,269	Manoj Gupta	BJP	7,640	1,629
151	Munirka (W)	Raj Bala Tokas	AAP	10,191	RamaaTokas	BJP	9,266	925
152	R.K Puram	Dharamvir Singh	AAP	8,328	Tulsi Joshi	BJP	3,738	4,590
153	Vasant Vihar (W)	Himani Jain	AAP	10,618	Raj Rani	BJP	8,007	2,611
154	Lado Sarai	Rajeev Sansanwal	AAP	13,385	Pravesh Sejwal	BJP	8,429	4,956
155	Mehrauli (W)	Rekha Mahender Chaudhary	AAP	15,317	Indu Sharma	BJP	14,047	1,270
156	Vasant Kunj	Jag Mohan Mhelawat	BJP	8,992	Amarjeet	AAP	8,238	754
157	Aya Nagar (W)	Ved Pal Sheetal Chaudhary	INC	10,226	Himani Ambawta	AAP	8,683	1,543
158	Bhati	Sunder Singh	AAP	13,456	Joginder Tanwar	INC	9,385	4,071
159	Chhatarpur (W)	Pinky Tyagi	AAP	16,290	Shikha Tyagi	BJP	7,768	8,522
160	Said-Ul-Ajaib	Umed Singh	AAP	12,168	Kamal Yadav	BJP	10,123	2,045
161	Deoli (W)	Anita	BJP	16,147	Sneh Lata Fauji	AAP	15,983	164
162	Tigri (SC-W)	Jyoti Prakash Jarwal	AAP	14,971	Meera	BJP	8,780	6,191
163	Sangam Vihar-A	Chandan Kumar Choudhary	BJP	9,392	Neeraj Yadav	AAP	9,003	389
164	Dakshin Puri (SC)	Prem Chauhan	AAP	16,500	Raj Kumar Chautala	BJP	10,412	6,088
165	Madangir (SC-W)	Geeta	AAP	13,391	Manisha	BJP	6,364	7,027
166	Pushp Vihar (SC)	Arun Navariya	AAP	13,721	Naresh	BJP	10,114	3,607
167	Khanpur (W)	Mamta Yadav	BJP	13,687	Suman Gupta	AAP	10,926	2,761
168	Sangam Vihar-C	Pankaj Gupta	AAP	16,568	Neeraj Gupta	BJP	13,135	3,433
169	Sangam Vihar-B (W)	Kajal Singh	AAP	18,856	Savita Devi	BJP	9,676	9,180
170	Tughlakabad Extension	Bhagbir	AAP	17,055	Poonam Bhati	BJP	10,904	6,151
171	Chitaranjan Park (W)	Ashu Thakur	AAP	10,443	Kandhan Choudhary	BJP	10,399	44
172	Chirag Delhi	Krishan Jakhar	AAP	17,768	Rakesh Kumar Gullaiya	BJP	14,052	3,716
173	Greater Kailash (W)	Shikha Roy	BJP	9,907	Ajit Kaur Pasricha	AAP	7,233	2,674
174	Sri Niwas Puri	Rajpal Singh	BJP	12,394	Indu	AAP	10,691	1,703
175	Kalkaji (W)	Yogita Singh	BJP	7,792	Shivani Chauhan	AAP	6,580	1,212
176	Govind Puri	Chander Prakash	BJP	18,929	Vijay Kumar	AAP	16,155	2,774
177	Harkesh Nagar (SC-W)	Mamta Pawan Pratap	AAP	17,931	Mamta Devi	BJP	6,804	11,127
178	Tughlakabad (W)	Sugandha	AAP	12,919	Pushpa	BJP	9,885	3,034
179	Pul Pehladpur (SC)	Rakesh Lohia	AAP	17,109	Munshi Ram	BJP	13,470	3,639
180	Badarpur (SC-W)	Manju Devi	AAP	16,674	Veena	BJP	9,769	6,905
181	Molarband	Hemchand Goel	AAP	13,206	Gagan Kasana	BJP	13,079	127
182	Meethapur (W)	Guddi Devi	BJP	11,521	Reeta	AAP	9,216	2,305
183	Hari Nagar Extension	Nikhil Chaprana	AAP	10,634	Mohit Chokan	IND	10,169	465
184	Jaitpur (W)	Hema	AAP	14,080	Rachna Mishra	BJP	10,735	3,345
185	Madanpur Khadar East (SC)	Praveen Kumar	AAP	11,306	Lekhraj Singh	BJP	10,995	311
186	Madanpur Khadar West	Braham Singh	BJP	12,921	Harinder Singh	AAP	8,795	4,126
187	Sarita Vihar (W)	Neetu	BJP	15,493	Muskan	AAP	10,788	4,705
188	Abul Fazal Enclave	Ariba Khan	INC	16,554	Wajid Khan	AAP	15,075	1,479
189	Zakir Nagar (W)	Naziya Danish	INC	16,878	Salma Khan	AAP	16,405	473
190	New Ashok Nagar	Sanjeev Kumar Singh	BJP	14,558	Anita Singh	AAP	8,294	6,264
191	Mayur Vihar Phase-I (SC-W)	Beena	AAP	16,157	Prema Devi	BJP	13,736	2,421
192	Trilokpuri (SC)	Vijay Kumar	AAP	16,765	Surender Kumar	BJP	11,759	5,006
193	Kondli (W)	Munesh	BJP	10,834	Vinita	AAP	8,343	2,491
194	Gharoli (SC-W)	Priyanka Gautam	AAP	15,290	Sunita Gautam	BJP	11,457	3,833
195	Kalyanpuri (SC)	Dhirender Kumar Bunty Gautam	AAP	18,370	Raj Kumar Dhillo	BJP	12,909	5,461
196	Mayur Vihar Phase-II	Devendra Kumar	AAP	11,538	Bipin Bihari Singh	BJP	9,950	1,588
197	Patpar Ganj (SC)	Renu Chaudhary	BJP	10,400	Seema	AAP	9,997	403
198	Vinod Nagar	Ravinder Singh Negi	BJP	13,830	Kuldeep Bhandari	AAP	11,519	2,311
199	Mandawali (SC)	Shashi Chandna	BJP	10,818	Reena Tomar	AAP	10,632	186
200	Pandav Nagar	Yashpal Singh Kaintura	BJP	13,390	Vijay Singh Shishodia Sonu	AAP	13,150	240
201	Lalita Park (W)	Shweta Nigam	AAP	9,855	Himanshi Pandey	BJP	6,815	3,040
202	Shakarpur	Ram Kishor Sharma	BJP	13,878	Sharad Dikshit	AAP	10,867	3,011
203	Laxmi Nagar (SC)	Alka Raghav	BJP	11,612	Meenakshi Sharma	AAP	7,793	3,819
204	Preet Vihar	Ramesh Kumar Garg	BJP	12,879	Ramesh Pandit	AAP	6,928	5,951
205	I.P Extension (SC)	Rachna	AAP	12,717	Amrita Pachauri	BJP	12,245	472
206	Anand Vihar	Monika Pant	BJP	13,137	Rahul Jain	AAP	10,473	2,664
207	Vishwas Nagar (SC-W)	Jyoti Rani	AAP	11,239	Cherry Singh	BJP	10,547	692
208	Anarkali (W)	Meenakshi Sharma	BJP	13,301	Rekha	AAP	8,883	4,418
209	Jagat Puri	Raju Sachdeva	BJP	14,962	Shiv Dutt Kaushik	AAP	12,987	1,975
210	Geeta Colony (W)	Neemaa Bhagat	BJP	10,871	Kawaljeet	AAP	10,217	654
211	Krishna Nagar	Sandeep Kapoor	BJP	13,924	Jugal Arora	AAP	10,499	3,425
212	Gandhi Nagar (W)	Priya Kamboj	BJP	12,474	Rakhi	AAP	8,052	4,422
213	Shastri Park	Sameer Ahmad	INC	12,503	Aditya Chaudhary	AAP	9,454	3,049
214	Azad Nagar (W)	Neelam	BJP	17,495	Shobha Devi	AAP	9,161	8,334
215	Shahdara (SC)	Bharat Gautam	BJP	15,634	Dalchand Anand	AAP	11,121	4,513
216	Jhilmil	Pankaj Luthra	BJP	19,920	Avdhesh Kumar Chaubey	AAP	11,538	8,382
217	Dilshad Colony (W)	Preeti	AAP	16,136	Sunrika Sharma	BJP	13,493	2,643
218	Sundar Nagri (SC-W)	Mohini	AAP	20,079	Renu	BJP	9,676	10,403
219	Dilshad Garden	B S Panwar	BJP	15,315	Praveen Kasana	AAP	14,371	944
220	Nand Nagri (SC)	Ramesh Kumar Bisaiya	AAP	15,959	KM Rinku	BJP	15,905	54
221	Ashok Nagar (W)	Reena Maheshwari	BJP	15,406	Sushma Rana	AAP	8,790	6,616
222	Ram Nagar East	Chander Prakash Sharma	BJP	15,959	Anil Gautam	AAP	12,863	3,096
223	Rohtash Nagar (W)	Shivani Panchal	AAP	9,398	Suman Lata	BJP	9,026	372
224	Welcome Colony	Ritesh Suji	BJP	15,464	Sudesh Choudhary	AAP	10,303	5,161
225	Seelampur (W)	Shakila Ahmed	IND	10,830	Seema Sharma	BJP	6,568	4,262
226	Gautam Puri	Satya Sharma	BJP	8,310	Md Riyasat	INC	7,091	1,219
227	Chauhan Banger (W)	Shagufta Chaudhary	INC	21,131	Asma Begum	AAP	5,938	15,193
228	Maujpur	Anil Kumar Sharma	BJP	15,533	Vinod Kumar Sharma	INC	7,748	7,785
229	Braham Puri (W)	Chhaya Gaurav Sharma	AAP	14,796	Kavita Kumari Sharma	BJP	14,008	788
230	Bhajanpura	Rekha Rani	AAP	11,842	Ram Raj Tiwari	BJP	8,710	3,132
231	Ghonda (W)	Preeti Gupta	BJP	15,763	Vidya Wati	AAP	12,409	3,354
232	Yamuna Vihar	Pramod Gupta	BJP	15,875	Vaneeta	AAP	6,420	9,455
233	Subash Mohalla (W)	Manisha Singh	BJP	11,206	Rekha Tyagi	AAP	8,535	2,671
234	Kabir Nagar	Zarif	INC	12,885	Sazid	AAP	8,790	4,095
235	Gorakh Park (W)	Priyanka Saxena	AAP	9,936	Kusum Tomar	BJP	7,988	1,948
236	Kardam Puri	Mukesh Kumar Bansal	BJP	15,070	Mukesh Yadav	AAP	7,593	7,477
237	Harsh Vihar (SC-W)	Poonam Nirmal	AAP	19,769	Bijendri	BJP	13,417	6,352
238	Saboli (SC)	Jaswant Singh	AAP	14,387	Hari Prakash Bahadur	BJP	11,076	3,311
239	Gokal Puri (SC-W)	Somwati Chaudhry	AAP	17,112	Nirmla Kumari	BJP	10,765	6,347
240	Joharipur (SC)	Roshan Lal	AAP	13,095	Raj Kumar	BJP	11,659	1,436
241	Karawal Nagar-East (W)	Shimla Devi	BJP	17,611	Asha Bansal	AAP	8,559	9,052
242	Dayalpur	Puneet Sharma	BJP	18,483	Kamal Gaur	AAP	6,169	12,314
243	Mustafabad (W)	Sabila Begum	INC	14,921	Sarwari Begum	AIMIM	8,339	6,582
244	Nehru Vihar	Arun Singh Bhati	BJP	15,001	Aleem	INC	14,645	356
245	Brij Puri (W)	Nazia Khatun	INC	9,639	Afreen Naz	AAP	7,521	2,118
246	Sri Ram Colony	Md. Aamil Malik	AAP	17,209	Pramod Jha	BJP	9,717	7,492
247	Sadatpur (W)	Neeta Bisht	BJP	16,206	Rekha Tyagi	AAP	12,106	4,100
248	Karawal Nagar-West	Satyapal Singh	BJP	15,174	Jitendra Bansala	AAP	11,530	3,644
249	Sonia Vihar (W)	Soni Pandey	BJP	14,871	Rimjhim Sharma	AAP	13,233	1,638
250	Sabapur	Brijesh Singh	BJP	8,720	Birendra Kumar	AAP	6,856	1,864

^ Wards indicated with 'W' are reserved for women candidates, 'SC' are reserved for Scheduled castes candidates and 'SC-W' for Scheduled Castes woman candidates

== See also ==
- 2022 Elections in India
