= New Delhi Municipal Council Act, 1994 =

Parliament of India
- Status: In force

New Delhi Municipal Council Act, 1994 (Act No. 44 of 1994) is an Act of the Parliament of India that establishes the New Delhi Municipal Council (NDMC) and sets out the framework for the municipal government of New Delhi, the area that houses the seat of the Government of India. The Act received assent on 14 July 1994 and is deemed to have come into force on 25 May 1994. It replaced the Punjab Municipal Act, 1911, which had previously been applied to the area.

== Background ==
Before 1994, municipal administration in New Delhi was governed by the Punjab Municipal Act, 1911, as applied to the area. The rest of Delhi was governed by the Delhi Municipal Corporation Act, 1957, which created the Municipal Corporation of Delhi.

The Committee on the Reorganisation of Delhi Set-up recommended that a fresh law be passed by Parliament for the proper organisation and functioning of the NDMC, and noted that the 1911 Act as applied to the area was archaic and lacked clarity. There were also significant differences between the functional regimes of the old law and the 1957 Delhi Act.

The immediate trigger was the Constitution (Seventy-fourth Amendment) Act, 1992, which inserted Part IX-A on municipalities and required existing laws to be brought into conformity with it by 31 May 1994. The Delhi Municipal Corporation Act, 1957 had already been amended for this purpose.

== Legislative history ==
To meet the constitutional deadline, the New Delhi Municipal Council Ordinance, 1994 (Ordinance 8 of 1994) was promulgated on 25 May 1994. A Bill was then introduced in Parliament and passed as the New Delhi Municipal Council Act, 1994. Section 419 repeals the Ordinance while providing that actions taken under it are deemed to have been taken under the corresponding provisions of the Act.

== Provisions ==
The Act extends to New Delhi, defined as the area within the boundaries described in its First Schedule. It vests the municipal government of New Delhi in the Council.

== Structure ==
- The Act is divided into chapters covering, among other matters:
- the Council (sections 3-9), its functions (sections 10-12) and the Chairperson (sections 13-20)
- procedure, and municipal officers and employees (sections 21-43)
- revenue and expenditure, taxation and borrowing (sections 44-136)
- property and contracts (sections 137-144)
- water supply, drainage and sewage, and electricity supply (sections 145-201)
- streets and building regulations (sections 202-260)
- sanitation and public health, vital statistics, public safety and nuisances, and markets, trades and occupations (sections 261-333)
- improvement (sections 334-338), followed by chapters on powers, offences and penalties, rules, regulations and bye-laws, and miscellaneous provisions, ending at section 419
- Composition of the Council

Composition is set out in section 4. The Central Government nominates a Vice-Chairperson, in consultation with the Chief Minister of Delhi, from among certain categories of members.

== Repeal and savings ==
Section 416 provides that, from the date the Council was established, the Punjab Municipal Act, 1911 ceases to have effect within New Delhi.

== Amendments ==
The India Code lists a single amending Act: the New Delhi Municipal Council (Amendment) Act, 2011 (Act 5 of 2012). The amendment revised the composition of the Council and the procedure for presiding over its meetings. The original Act provided for three Members of the Legislative Assembly whose constituencies fall wholly or partly in New Delhi; after the 2008 delimitation, only two such constituencies remained. As amended, section 4(1)(e) makes the sitting Member of Parliament for the New Delhi constituency a member of the Council.

== Judicial challenges ==
The Act's validity has been challenged on the ground that the structure of the municipality it creates does not comply with Part IX-A of the Constitution. Such arguments were raised before the Delhi High Court in 2011.

== See also ==
- New Delhi Municipal Council
- Municipal Corporation of Delhi
- Seventy-fourth Amendment of the Constitution of India
- Delhi Cantonment Board
