= Adesh Gupta =

Indian politician

Adesh Kumar Gupta
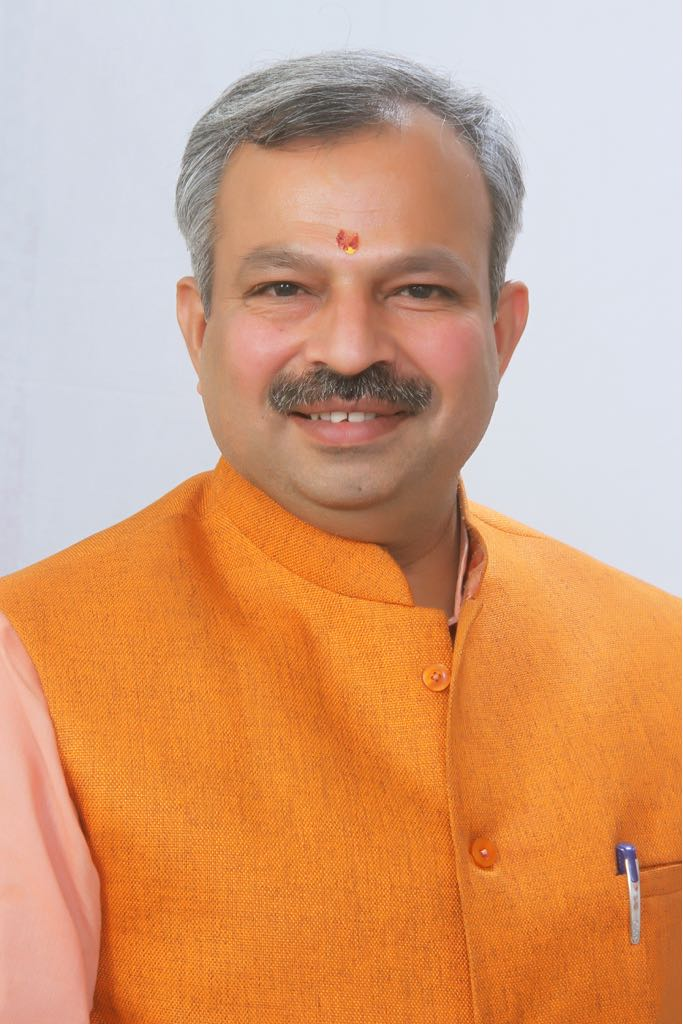

President, Bharatiya Janata Party, Delhi
- In office 2 June 2020 – 11 December 2022
- Preceded by: Manoj Tiwari
- Succeeded by: Virendra Sachdeva

Mayor of North Delhi
- In office April 2018 – 29 April 2019

Personal details
- Born: 29 January 1969 (age 57) Gursahaiganj, Uttar Pradesh, India
- Party: Bharatiya Janata Party
- Spouse: Anuradha Gupta
- Children: 3
- Education: (B.Sc.)
- Alma mater: Chhatrapati Shahu Ji Maharaj University

Adesh Kumar Gupta (born 29 January 1969) is an Indian politician. He is a member of the Bharatiya Janta Party (BJP) and the former president of party's Delhi unit. Starting his political career as a twelfth-grade student when he joined the Akhil Bharatiya Vidyarthi Parishad, he remained active in student politics when he attended Chhatrapati Shahu Ji Maharaj University. His association with the Ram Mandir Movement led to his arrest and he was imprisoned for a year at Kanpur in 1991. He joined the Bharatiya Yuva Morcha when he moved to Delhi from his home district of Kannauj in 1994. He campaigned in the 2017 Municipal Corporation of Delhi election successfully from the West Patel Nagar ward and became the Mayor of North Delhi Municipal Corporation in April 2018, remaining in office till 29 April 2019. He was appointed president of Delhi BJP on 2 June 2020 by the National President of the BJP, Jagat Prakash Nadda, following the resignation of Manoj Tiwari. On 11 December 2022, he stepped down from the post of State BJP President after the party's loss in the MCD Elections of 2022. He was replaced by Virendra Sachdeva.

== Personal life ==
Gupta was born in 1969, the eldest son of Shambhu Dayal Gupta, in Gursahaiganj, Kannauj (formerly a part of Farrukhabad district and now in Kannauj district), Uttar Pradesh. He received his twelfth-grade Higher Secondary School Certificate from Madan Mohan Malviya Inter College in 1987. He later attended Chhatrapati Shahu Ji Maharaj University at Kanpur and graduated with a Bachelor of Science degree.

After completing his higher education, he moved to Delhi in 1994 and started tutoring to make his living in the city. After working as a tuition teacher for two years he established his own business. However, his business was not successful and he returned to the teaching profession. After tutoring for few more years he applied for the position of contractor with the Central Public Works Department and acquired considerable success in this profession.

== Political career ==
Gupta is a member of the Bharatiya Janta Party (BJP) and is active in the politics of Delhi. He embarked on a career in politics after becoming a member of the Akhil Bharatiya Vidyarthi Parishad (ABVP) during his time in the Madan Mohan Malviya Inter College as a twelfth-grade student in 1987. His involvement in student politics continued at Chhatrapati Shahu Ji Maharaj University. He rose in the ABVP to become the head of its district unit and later secretary of the state unit. He actively participated in the Ram Janmabhoomi Movement and canvassed students for its support. The Ram Janmabhoomi Movement was spearheaded by the BJP and the Vishwa Hindu Parishad to claim disputed land in Ayodhya, Uttar Pradesh, hypothesised to be the birthplace of the Hindu deity Rama, for Hindus. Gupta's association with the movement led to his arrest by police in 1991 and his incarceration at a temporary prison at Kanpur for a year.

Gupta joined the Bharatiya Yuva Morcha and became its national office secretary in 1994 under the leadership of president Dharmendra Pradhan. He also held several positions in the BJP's Delhi unit from 2009 to 2014, becoming the West Patel Nagar Mandal President in 2009 and later the head of Najafgarh Mandal.

In the 2017 Municipal Corporation of Delhi election, Gupta was given a BJP ticket to contest from the West Patel Nagar ward of the Karol Bagh Zone of the North Delhi Municipal Corporation (NDMC). He won the election and in April 2018 became the Mayor of the NDMC. He was succeeded by Avtar Singh for the post of mayor on 29 April 2019. As a member of the NDMC, Gupta was elected unopposed as a member of the standing committee of the house on the same day he resigned as mayor.

=== Delhi BJP President ===
Gupta was appointed the president of the Delhi BJP on 2 June 2020 by the National President of the BJP, Jagat Prakash Nadda. He succeeded actor-politician and member of parliament Manoj Tiwari, who had tendered his resignation due to unsatisfactory performance of the party in the 2020 Delhi Legislative Assembly election but had been asked by the party to remain in office until the new appointment to replace him. Gupta's appointment was viewed by multiple media sources as an attempt by the BJP to regain its traditional voters, including the Vaishya community to which Gupta belongs.

Gupta led a protest at Rajghat on 7 June 2020 along with other BJP leaders, including the Leader of Opposition of the Legislative Assembly of Delhi, Ramvir Singh Bidhuri, against the Government of Delhi, accusing the latter of mishandling the COVID-19 pandemic in Delhi. They were detained by police for violating lockdown norms and were taken to Rajender Nagar Police Station.

The BJP unit of Delhi launched a 'Jan Jagran Abhiyan' (transl. Public Awareness Campaign) about the COVID-19 pandemic under Gupta on 17 June 2020. The campaign included all the members of parliament from Delhi and other senior leaders of the party, and involved the distribution of decoction packets, sanitizer bottles, and face masks in different areas of the city.

Gupta headed the Delhi contingent of the party in the virtual meeting of the BJP on 4 July 2020, which was attended by all of its regional units in the country and chaired by Prime Minister Narendra Modi in the presence of party national president Jagat Prakash Nadda. Gupta gave a presentation during the meeting and briefed the others about the different social works carried out by the party in Delhi under the 'Sewa Hi Sanathan' Campaign. These included COVID-19 relief measures and encouraging people to donate to the PM CARES Fund and its joint programme with Delhi Police, 'Anivarya', to distribute sanitary napkins among women and girls living in the slums of Delhi.

Gupta also wrote to all three mayors of Delhi, including the North Delhi Municipal Corporation, the South Delhi Municipal Corporation, and the East Delhi Municipal Corporation, asking them not to go ahead with their respective anti-encroachment drives planned to be carried out citywide against street vendors during the COVID-19 pandemic, noting its economic impact.

In 2022, he supported the anti-encroachment drives.

=== Electoral performance ===
In 2022, Gupta refused to contest in the by-election for Rajinder Nagar Assembly constituency.

== See also ==
- Bharatiya Janata Party, Delhi
- Rajinder Nagar Assembly constituency
