= 2012 Delhi Municipal Corporation election =

Election for MCD in Delhi

- 15 April 2012

All 272 seats in the Municipal Corporation of Delhi 137 seats needed for a majority
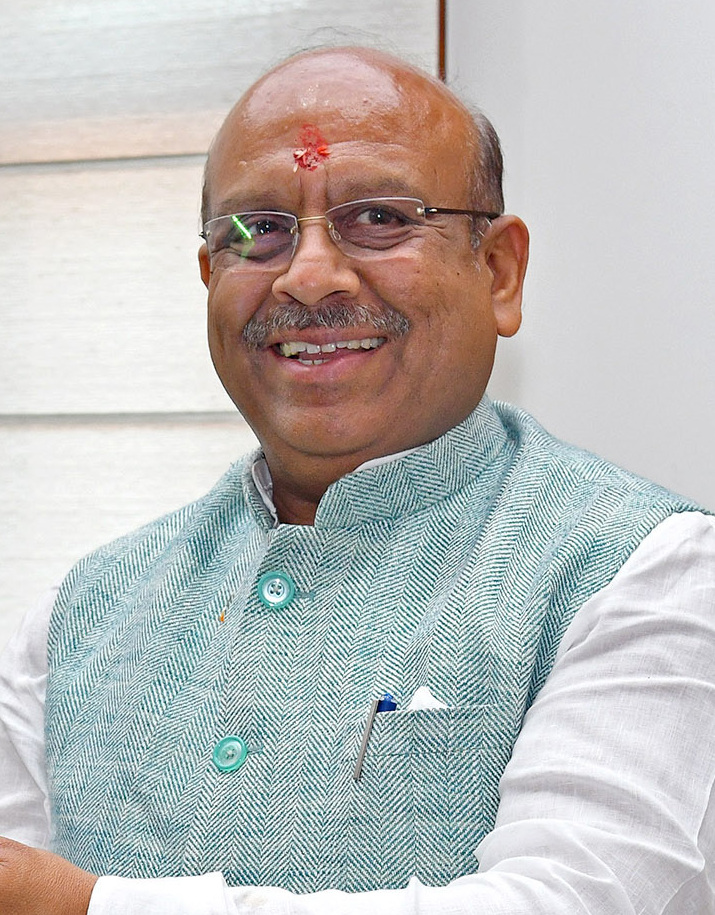

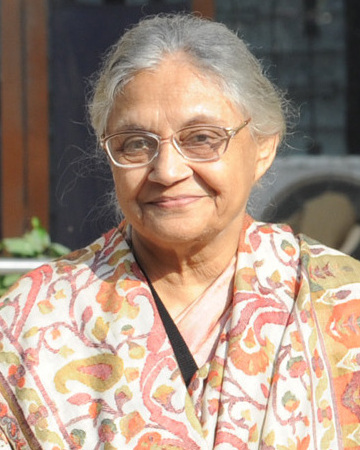
	Majority party	Minority party	Third party
			BSP
Leader	Vijender Gupta	Sheila Dikshit
Party	BJP	INC	BSP
Last election	164	67	17
Seats won	138	77	15
Seat change	▼26	▲10	▼2
MCD majority before election
BJP
Elected MCD majority
BJP

The 2012 Delhi municipal corporation election was held on 15 April 2012 and the result was declared on 17 April 2012.

== Schedule ==
Poll Event	Schedule
Filling of nominations	19 March 2012
Last Date for filing nomination	26 March 2012
Date of Poll	15 April 2012
Date of Counting of Votes	17 April 2012

== Election results ==
The votes were counted and result was declared on 17 April 2012.

North Delhi Municipal Corporation
Party	Symbol	Wards won
Bharatiya Janata Party		59
Indian National Congress		29
Bahujan Samaj Party		7
Others		9
Total		104

South Delhi Municipal Corporation
Party	Symbol	Wards won
Bharatiya Janata Party		44
Indian National Congress		29
Bahujan Samaj Party		5
Others		26
Total		104

East Delhi Municipal Corporation
Party	Symbol	Wards won
Bharatiya Janata Party		35
Indian National Congress		19
Bahujan Samaj Party		3
Others		7
Total		64
