= Shelly Oberoi =

Indian Politician

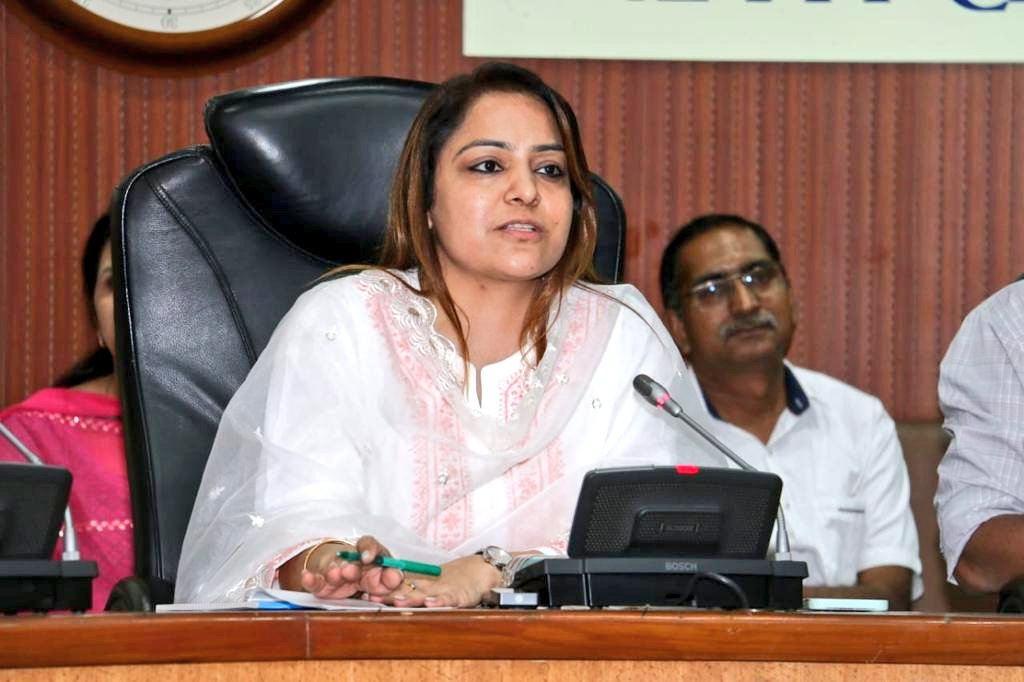
- Shelly Oberoi chairing a meeting of Municipal Corporation of Delhi

26th Mayor of Delhi
- In office 22 February 2023 – 14 November 2024
- Deputy: Aaley Mohammad Iqbal
- Preceded by: Rajni Abbi
- Succeeded by: Mahesh Kumar Khichi
- Constituency: East Patel Nagar (Ward no. 86)

Personal details
- Born: 1983 (age 42–43) Delhi, India
- Party: Aam Aadmi Party
- Education: Janki Devi Memorial College, University of Delhi (Bachelor of Commerce); Himachal Pradesh University (Master of Commerce); Indira Gandhi National Open University (PhD in Commerce)
- Occupation: Professor, Politician

Shelly Oberoi is an Indian politician who served as the Mayor of the Municipal Corporation of Delhi from February 2023 to November 2024.

Oberoi was the first mayor to be elected after the re-unification of the Municipal Corporation of North, South and East Delhi into a unified Municipal Corporation of Delhi.

== Early life and education ==
Oberoi was born in 1983. She received her PhD in Commerce from Indira Gandhi National Open University, and did Bachelor of Commerce from Janki Devi Memorial College and Master of Commerce from Himachal Pradesh University.

She has served as an assistant visiting professor at Delhi University.

== Political career ==
Oberoi joined Aam Aadmi Party, Delhi in 2013 and became the vice-president of its women’s wing in 2021. She won the 2022 Delhi Municipal Corporation election from Ward 86 which comes under Patel Nagar Assembly constituency. On 23 December 2022, she became a mayoral candidate. She was elected as the Mayor of Delhi on 22 February 2023, winning by 34 votes against the BJP candidate Rekha Gupta and on 26 April 2023 she was re-elected as the mayor of the Municipal Corporation of Delhi after BJP candidate Shikha Rai name was withdrawn from the mayoral post. She served until November 2024. focusing his administration on civic sanitation and landfill management.
