= Joginder Singh Rana =

Indian politician

Joginder Singh Rana is an Indian politician. He is the member of the Aam Aadmi Party. He won the Municipal Corporation of Delhi election on 7 December 2022 by winning margin of 931 votes.

== Controversy ==
Joginder Singh Rana booked under Arms Act for ‘brandishing’ pistol after winning MCD election of 2022.
