= Adesh =

Adesh is a masculine given name. Notable people with the name include:

- Adesh Kanwarjit Singh Brar (1949–2012), Indian politician and farmer
- Adesh Chauhan, Indian politician
- Adesh Gupta (born 1969), Indian politician
- Adesh Pratap Singh Kairon, Indian politician
- Adesh Samaroo, Trinidad and Tobago musician
- Aadesh Shrivastava (1964–2015), Indian composer
