= Naraina Vihar =

- Neighborhood of Delhi
- Location in Delhi, India
- Coordinates: 28°38′27″N 77°8′38″E
- Country: India
- State: Delhi
- District: New Delhi

Languages
  - Official: Hindi, English
- Time zone: UTC+5:30 (IST)
- PIN: 110028
- Constituency: Rajinder Nagar

Naraina Vihar is a neighborhood in South West Delhi. It is composed of flats built by the Delhi Development Authority (DDA) and private residential houses. The neighborhood is connected with Delhi Metro by Naraina Vihar station.

Naraina Area is divided into industrial, residential, and rural areas. The industrial area has a large focus on steel and electronics. The headquarters of the Border Roads Organisation is also situated in Naraina.

Naraina Gaon is the rural area. Naraina is adjacent to the western segment of the Ring Road, Delhi between Dhaula Kuan and Rajouri Garden.

Surrounding areas include: Delhi Cantt, Mayapuri, Inderpuri, Pusa, Shadipur Depot, and Kirti Nagar.
