= Raja Iqbal Singh =

Indian politician and Mayor of Delhi from 2025 to 2026

Mayor, Delhi Municipal Corporation
- In office 25 April 2025 – 29 April 2026
- Deputy: Jai Bhagwan Yadav
- Preceded by: Mahesh Kumar Khichi
- Succeeded by: Pravesh Wahi
- Constituency: Ward No.13 Mukherjee Nagar

Personal details
- Party: Bharatiya Janata Party
- Education: SGTB Khalsa College, University of Delhi and Chaudhary Charan Singh University, Meerut
- Profession: Politician

Raja Iqbal Singh is an Indian politician who served as the Mayor of Delhi from 25 April 2025 to 29 April 2026. He is a member of the Bharatiya Janata Party (BJP) and serves as the councilor for the 13 Mukherjee Nagar (Central) ward in Delhi.

== Early life and education ==
Singh completed his Bachelor of Science (BSc) from SGTB Khalsa College, University of Delhi, and earned his LLB from Chaudhary Charan Singh University, Meerut.

== Political career ==
In 2017, Singh made his electoral debut when he won the MCD election from the GTB Nagar. He held several posts in the civic body and was appointed Mayor of the erstwhile North Delhi Municipal Corporation (MCD) in 2021–22. In 2025, he was elected as the Mayor of the Delhi Municipal Corporation. Following the completion of his tenure he was succeeded by fellow BJP leader Pravesh Wahi as the mayor.
