= Delhi Municipal Corporation (Amendment) Act, 2022 =

Parliament of India
- Long title: An Act further to amend the Delhi Municipal Corporation Act, 1957.
- Citation: Act. No. 10 of 2022
- Passed by: Lok Sabha
- Passed: 30 March 2022
- Passed by: Rajya Sabha
- Passed: 5 April 2022
- Assented to by: President
- Assented to: 18 April 2022
- Commenced: 22 May 2022

Legislative history

Initiating chamber: Lok Sabha
- Bill title: Delhi Municipal Corporation (Amendment) Bill, 2022
- Bill citation: Bill No. 92 of 2022
- Introduced by: Amit Shah, MoHA
- Introduced: 25 March 2022
- Passed: 30 March 2022

Revising chamber: Rajya Sabha
- Passed: 5 April 2022

Amends
- Delhi Municipal Corporation Act, 1957
- Status: In force

The Delhi Municipal Corporation (Amendment) Act, 2022 is a legislation of the Parliament of India pertaining to the local government in National Capital Territory of Delhi. The act reunifies previously trifurcated Municipal Corporation of Delhi.

== History ==
The system of Municipal Corporation was introduced in India during British Rule with formation of municipal corporation in Madras (Chennai) in 1688 followed by municipal corporations in Bombay (Mumbai) and Calcutta (Kolkata) by 1762. The system was followed later in other states by passing the respective Municipal Corporation Bill in each state to become law.

Local self government in Delhi began with the first meeting of the Delhi Municipality being held in 1863. The Delhi Municipal Corporation was formally established on April 7, 1958 through the Delhi Municipal Corporation Act, 1957. The act was subsequently amended in 1993 and 2011. The 2011 amendment trifurcated the municipal corporation into three smaller municipal corporations namely East Delhi Municipal Corporation (EDMC), North Delhi Municipal Corporation (NDMC), and South Delhi Municipal Corporation (SDMC).

The reasons provided for trifurcation included administrative efficiency, decentralisation, accountability. It was also reported that the trifurcation was done by the erstwhile Congress Chief Minister, Sheila Dikshit to dilute the power of the BJP which dominated the MCD. The trifurcation, however, was reported to have led to financial troubles, resource constraints, and poor service provision for the new corporations. Citing these concerns, the BJP-led central government subsequently announced intention to reunify the corporations.

The Delhi Municipal Corporation (Amendment) Bill, 2022 was introduced on 25 March and passed in Lok Sabha on 30 March and Rajya Sabha on 5 April. The system was aimed to ensure proper and optimum use of resources by effective planning.

== Provisions ==
Delhi Municipal Corporation (Amendment) Act, 2022 aims to:

- Give more autonomy to the body.
- Combine three separate municipal bodies into one.
- Help in proper utilisation of resources across the city.
- Guide in proper planning of the city.
- Make it possible to have a uniform decision making body.

The act further provided provisions for the appointment of Special Officer by Central Government to discharge powers and functions of Corporations till Delhi Municipal Corporation was formed and its first meeting took place. It also empowered the centre to, through a notification in official Gazette, determine number of seats for councillors, reserved seats for members of Schedule Caste community, reserved seats rotation and geographical boundary of each merged ward.

== Delimitation exercise ==
The Delhi Municipal Corporation (Amendment) Act, 2022 provides for a delimitation exercise and a reduction in councillor seats to “not more than 250 seats” from the existing 272. A three-member delimitation committee was constituted on July 8, 2022. It was required to complete the exercise and submit its report within four months from the date of its constitution. The committee was led by State Election Commissioner Vijay Dev. The average size of the ward was set to be around 65,000. Each assembly constituency was to be divided into a minimum of three wards and the principal of average population may not be maintained throughout, therefore a deviation to the extent of plus minus ten percent was to be acceptable to the Union Government of India. The total population of the corporation (2011 census) was divided by the total number of wards and average population of each ward obtained. The number of seats reserved for members of Scheduled Castes was to bear the same ratio to the total number of seats as the population of Scheduled Castes bears to the total population of Delhi. The Delimitation commission used digitised maps of Geospatial Delhi Limited (GSDL). After the delimitation commission submitted its report, the Union Government accepted its recommendations and issued notification on Oct 17, 2022, finalising the delimitation exercise.

== See also ==
- Delhi Municipal Corporation
