= Sri Guru Tegh Bahadur Khalsa College =

Constituent college of University of Delhi

Coordinates: 28°41′43″N 77°12′33″E

Sri Guru Tegh Bahadur Khalsa College, University of Delhi
- Seal of SGTB Khalsa College, Delhi
- Other name: SGTBKC
- Motto: ਅਘਾਹਾ ਕੂ ਤ੍ਰਾਘਿ (Punjabi) Aghāhā Kū Trāghi
- Motto in English: Look Forward
- Type: Coeducation
- Established: 1951
- Accreditation: NAAC
- Affiliations: University of Delhi
- Religious affiliation: Delhi Sikh Gurdwara Management Committee
- Academic affiliations: University of Delhi
- Principal: Gurmohinder Singh
- Total staff: 163
- Students: 3000+
- Location: Sri Guru Tegh Bahadur Khalsa College, North Campus, North Delhi, 110007, India
- Campus: 14.9 acres; Urban
- Colors: Pink and Yellow
- Website: sgtbkhalsadu.ac.in

Sri Guru Tegh Bahadur Khalsa College (shortened SGTB Khalsa College) is a constituent college of the University of Delhi. Established in 1951, it offers courses in science, commerce and humanities. With a campus spanning 14.9 acres, it is one of the largest colleges of the university, and ranks among the prestigious colleges in India. The institution has produced notable alumni in field of politics, law, sports and business.

== History ==
Sri Guru Tegh Bahadur Khalsa College was established in 1951 and has since been maintained by the Delhi Sikh Gurudwara Management Committee (DSGMC), a statutory body established under the Delhi Sikh Gurdwaras Act 1971, passed by the Parliament of India. The focus of the college at the time of inception was to ensure a comprehensive social transformation through access to quality education, in particular to young Punjabi refugees of the Partition of India in 1947, and to conserve and promote Punjabi language, culture, and heritage. The college is named after the Ninth Guru of Sikhism, 'Sri Guru Tegh Bahadur Sahib', who sacrificed his life to uphold secular values and is an institution with a cosmopolitan environment and a progressive outlook. The college had its beginning in four rooms of a school in Dev Nagar, with 49 students and a faculty of 6, and moved to its present location that is University of Delhi's North Campus in 1973.

== Academics ==
=== Academic programs ===
At present, there are 19 undergraduate programs, 12 postgraduate programs, 1 postgraduate diplomas, 3 undergraduate diplomas, and 9 certificate courses, making a total of 44 programs. As of the session 2023–23, there were 3,656 students in these programs, and 163 full-time teachers. The college offers the following courses:

==== Degree programs ====
- B.A. (Hons) in Business Economics also known as B.B.E.
- B.A. (Hons) in Economics, English, Hindi, History, Political Science and Punjabi
- B.A. (Hons) Humanities and Social Sciences (erstwhile B.A. Program)
- B.Com.(Hons)
- B.Com. (Program)
- B.Sc. (Honours) in Botany, Chemistry, Computer Science, Electronics, Mathematics, Physics and Zoology
- B.Sc. (Honours) Life Science (erstwhile B.Sc. Program Life Science)
- B.Sc. Physical Science (erstwhile B.Sc. Program Physical Science)
- M.A. in Economics, English, Hindi, History, Political Science and Punjabi.

==== Diploma programs ====
- PG Diploma Forensic Science
- UG Diploma in French, German and Spanish

==== Certificate programs ====
- Certificate Courses in Chinese, French, German, Japanese, Korean, Persian, Punjabi, Spanish and Russian

=== Academic work ===
The college has undertaken projects in the field of ciliate zoology and has reported new species of protozoans from Northeast India. It collaborates with the Natural History Museum, London and University of Camerino.

It offers a dual credential programs in collaboration with University of the Fraser Valley and Avans.

== Infrastructure ==
The college has 59 classrooms, 19 labs, 6 research labs, indoor and outdoor sports facilities, gymnasium, cafeteria and bank besides other utility services such as post-office and market. The college is connected by road and Delhi Metro link, and majority students are day-scholars. A hostel for girls can accommodate 147 students, and a hostel for boys was inaugurated in February 2021; it has since been converted into a girls hostel resulting in two hostels for girl students.

=== Sports ===
The college has a spacious playing field for hockey, cricket, and football, and facilities for indoor games like table tennis, carom, and chess, as well as a mini gymnasium. The Sant Harchand Singh Longowal Sports Complex consists of a gymnasium, a squash racket room, three table tennis rooms, and changing rooms for players are also in this complex. The college has a floodlit lawn tennis court.

== Rankings ==
It was ranked 29th across India among colleges by the NIRF in 2025.

=== Accreditation ===
It scored 3.41 and was certified grade A by National Assessment and Accreditation Council.

== Placements ==
Apart from bringing a varied list of recruiters to the campus, the Placement Cell organises talks, study abroad seminars, internship opportunities and workshops for the collective student body. Training and Placement Cell of the college provides following facilities at the college premises.

1. Conducting mock personal interviews and group discussions to make students aware of the selection procedures
2. Summer industrial training, internship and final placement of students.
3. Conducting industrial visits and industry-oriented training programmes.
4. Invite professional guest speakers to impart necessary inputs for the above-mentioned activities.

=== Major recruiters ===
Major companies visit the campus at the annual placement drive. Some of the major recruiters at Sri Guru Tegh Bahadur Khalsa College are as follows: E&Y, KPMG, Deloitte, PWC, Zomato, SBI, TCS, Wipro, Tech Mahindra, IBM Daksh and many more companies.

== Alumni ==
A few notable alumni from SGTB Khalsa College include:

Media and entertainment

- Saurabh Shukla, actor, director and scriptwriter.
- Aasif Sheikh, actor and comedian.
- Arjit Taneja, actor.
- Rabbi Shergill, singer and musician.
- Karan Singh, YouTuber and magician.
- Meera Chopra, actress and model.
- Inderpal Singh, actor and television anchor.
- Shivani Raghuvanshi, actress.
- Rashmeet Kaur, singer.

=== Politics ===
- Arvinder Singh Lovely, Former Cabinet Minister, Delhi government.
- Manjinder Singh Sirsa, Cabinet Minister, Delhi government and Member of Legislative Assembly, Rajouri Garden Assembly constituency.
- Raja Iqbal Singh, Former Mayor, Municipal Corporation of Delhi.

=== Sports ===
- Mohinder Amarnath, Indian cricketer and 1983 Cricket World Cup winner
- Hiten Dalal, Indian cricketer
- Manjot Kalra, Indian cricketer
- Nitish Rana, Indian cricketer
- Maninder Singh, former cricketer turned commentator
- Sham Lal (gymnast), former gymnast, represented India twice in Olympics; Arjuna winner
- Amoj Jacob, Asian Games 2022 Gold medalist (Men's 4 × 400 m)
- Karan Sharma, Indian domestic cricketer
- Harendra Singh, head coach of the Indian women's hockey team
- Ashok Diwan, Indian field hockey team player
- Shyam Lal Meena, Indian archer and Arjuna Award recipient

=== Notable faculty ===
- Gurdip Singh Randhawa, college principal (1971–1992), Padma Bhushan recipient.

== Annual fest ==
Every year an annual fest of SGTB Khalsa College, "Lashkara" is organised. Artists like Diljit Dosanjh, Guru Randhawa, Karan Aujla, Dilpreet Dhillon, Jassi Gill, Babbal Rai, Jass Manak, Guri, Jordan Sandhu, Prabh Gill and Gurnam Bhullar have performed at this fest.

== In popular culture ==
Some scenes of movie Mukhtiar Chadha was shot in this college.
