= Charak Palika Hospital =

Hospital in New Delhi, India

Geography
- Location: New Delhi, India
- Coordinates: 28°35′7.05″N 77°10′37.53″E

Organisation
- Affiliated university: New Delhi Municipal Council

Charak Palika Hospital a government hospital maintained by the New Delhi Municipal Council.

== Medical facilities ==
- Cardiology / Medicine and ECHO
- Surgery
- ENT including audiology
- Paediatrics
- Eye
- Physiotherapy
- Radiology and Ultrasound facilities
- Psychiatry
- Orthopedics
- Dental
