= Manoj Kumar Dwivedi =

Indian Administrative Service officer

Chairperson of the New Delhi Municipal Council
- Incumbent
- Assumed office August 2026
- Preceded by: Keshav Chandra

Personal details
- Born: 9 July 1972 (age 54) Haryana, India
- Education: IIT Delhi
- Occupation: Civil servant
- Awards: Lieutenant Governor’s Gold Medal for Integrity, Honesty and Meritorious Public Service

Manoj Kumar Dwivedi (born 9 July 1972) is an Indian civil servant of the Indian Administrative Service (IAS). A member of the 1997 batch of the AGMUT cadre, he has held several administrative positions in the Government of India and the Government of Jammu and Kashmir.

Currently he is serving as chairperson of the New Delhi Municipal Council.

== Early life and education ==
Manoj Kumar Dwivedi was born on 9 July 1972 in Haryana. He studied chemical engineering at the Indian Institute of Technology Delhi and obtained a Bachelor of Technology degree.

== Career ==
Dwivedi joined the Indian Administrative Service in 1997. His service record identifies him as a member of the 1997 batch and the Jammu and Kashmir cadre, which subsequently became part of the AGMUT framework.

During his career in Jammu and Kashmir, Dwivedi served as Sub-Divisional Magistrate in Kathua, Deputy Commissioner in Rajouri, and held administrative positions with the Mata Vaishno Devi Shrine Board. He later served as Commissioner and Secretary in the Jammu and Kashmir administration, including in the Forest and Industries departments. He was promoted to the Higher Administrative Grade in 2022 and served as Principal Secretary in the General Administration Department.

At the central level, he served as Joint Secretary in the Department of Commerce and as Joint Secretary and Additional Secretary in the Department of Personnel and Training.

In August 2026, the Government of India appointed Dwivedi as Chairperson of the New Delhi Municipal Council.

== Awards and recognition ==
Dwivedi has been awarded the Lieutenant Governor’s Gold Medal for Integrity, Honesty and Meritorious Public Service, described by the IIT Delhi Alumni Association as the highest honour bestowed upon a civil servant in Jammu and Kashmir.
