= Gurdip Singh Randhawa =

Indian academic (1925–2015)

- Born: 16 February 1925
- Died: 29 August 2015 (aged 90)

Gurdip Singh Randhawa (16 February 1925 – 29 August 2015) was an Indian academic who served as Vice-Chancellor of Guru Nanak Dev University, Amritsar and as Principal of Sri Guru Tegh Bahadur Khalsa College, Delhi. He received Padma Bhushan, the third-highest civilian award of India, in 2009 in science and engineering.

Randhawa was professor of English literature at Khalsa College and also served as the principal of the college from 1971 to 1988. He later chaired the position of Vice-Chancellor of Guru Nanak Dev University from 1989 to 1997 serving for almost three tenures. He was known for initiating various infrastructural changes in the university and also for starting the maximum number of academic programmes. He died on 29 August 2015 at Chandigarh at the age of 90.
