= Pravesh Wahi =

Indian politician and Mayor of Delhi since 2026

Mayor, Delhi Municipal Corporation
- Incumbent
- Assumed office 29 April 2026
- Preceded by: Raja Iqbal Singh

Leader of the House, Municipal Corporation of Delhi
- In office 2025 – 29 April 2026

Member of the Municipal Corporation of Delhi
- Incumbent
- Assumed office 2022
- Constituency: Rohini East (Ward 53)
- In office 2007–2017
- Constituency: Rohini / Naharpur

Personal details
- Born: 1963 (age 62–63) Delhi, India
- Party: Bharatiya Janata Party
- Education: Shivaji College, Delhi University
- Profession: Politician and Businessman

Pravesh Wahi (born c. 1963) is an Indian politician who serves as the Mayor of Delhi since April 2026. A leader belonging to the Bharatiya Janata Party (BJP), he represents the Rohini East ward in the Municipal Corporation of Delhi (MCD). Wahi has a long-standing career in local municipal governance, having served three terms as a city councillor.

== Early life and education ==
Wahi is from a Khatri Punjabi family that migrated to Delhi from Rawalpindi. He was educated in Delhi and earned a Bachelor of Arts from Shivaji College, Delhi University, in 1984. He works as a businessman.

== Political career ==
Wahi began his career in the RSS and worked with the Vishva Hindu Parishad (VHP) before joining the BJP Yuva Morcha. He served as a councillor for three terms starting in 2007, representing North Delhi areas, and held leadership roles including Chairman of the Standing Committee for the North Delhi Municipal Corporation.

In April 2026, Wahi was elected Mayor of Delhi with 156 votes out of 165, focusing his administration on civic sanitation and landfill management.
