= Sarita Chaudhary =

Indian politician

Sarita Choudhary

Mayor of South Delhi
- In office 2013–2014

Sarita Chaudhary (born 1975) is an Indian politician and former mayor of South Delhi Municipal Corporation and a leader of Bharatiya Janata Party.

She studied B.Ed and LLB from Maharishi Dayanand University.
