= Savita Gupta =

Indian politician

Mayor of South Delhi
- In office 2012–2013

Savita Gupta is an Indian politician and a former mayor of South Delhi Municipal Corporation. She is a three-time councillor from Amar Colony. A member of Bharatiya Janata Party, Gupta hails from Jammu.
