= 2017 Delhi Municipal Corporation election =

Election for MCD in Delhi

2017 Municipal Corporation of Delhi election
← 2012	April 23, 2017	2022 →

All 272 seats in the Municipal Corporation of Delhi 137 seats needed for a majority
- Turnout: 53.58%
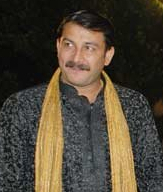

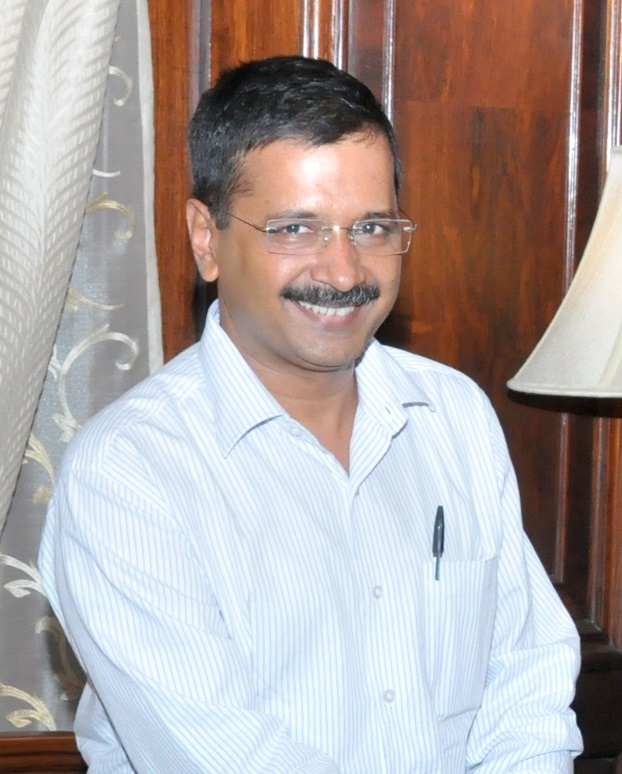

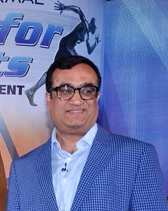
	Majority party	Minority party	Third party
Leader	Manoj Tiwari	Arvind Kejriwal	Ajay Maken
Party	BJP	AAP	INC
Last election	138	Did not exist	77
Seats won	181	49	31
Seat change	▲43	▲49	▼46
Popular vote	25,75,116	18,71,964	15,04,964
Percentage	36.08%	26.23%	21.09%
Swing		N/A
MCD majority before election
BJP
Elected MCD majority
BJP

The elections for the Municipal Corporation of Delhi were held on 23 April 2017. The results were declared on 26 April 2017 in which BJP was elected. The total turnout for the election was 54%. The major parties contesting the election are BJP, INC and AAP.

== Schedule ==
Poll Event	Schedule	Day
Issue of notification of election	27 March 2017	Monday
Last Date for filing nomination	3 April 2017	Monday
Scrutiny of Nominations	5 April 2017	Wednesday
Withdrawal of Candidature	8 April 2017	Saturday
Date of Poll	23 April 2017	Sunday
Date of Counting	26 April 2017	Wednesday
Date of Completion	5 May 2017	Friday

== Delimitation exercise ==
In 2016, delimitation was carried out for MCD elections. the average population of each ward was to be 60,000 with a variation of 10% to 15%.

== Election results ==
The votes were counted and result was declared on 26 April 2017.

North Delhi Municipal Corporation
Party	Symbol	Seats won	Seats +/−	Vote %
Bharatiya Janata Party		64	▲5	35.63
Aam Aadmi Party		21	▲21	27.88
Indian National Congress		16	▼13	20.73
Others		3	▼13	15.76
Total		104	-	100

South Delhi Municipal Corporation
Party	Symbol	Seats won	Seats +/−	Vote %
Bharatiya Janata Party		70	▲26	34.87
Aam Aadmi Party		16	▲16	26.44
Indian National Congress		12	▼17	20.29
Others		6	▼25	18.40
Total		104	-	100

East Delhi Municipal Corporation
Party	Symbol	Seats won	Seats +/−	Vote %
Bharatiya Janata Party		47	▲12	38.61
Aam Aadmi Party		12	▲12	23.40
Indian National Congress		3	▼16	22.84
Others		2	▼8	15.15
Total		64	-	100

== 2021 By election ==
In 2021, by elections were conducted by Delhi Election Commission in the following 5 vacant seats:

Ward	Party Before	Party After	Reason for by poll
Rohini C	AAP	AAP	Resignation
Shalimar Bagh	BJP	AAP	Death
Trilokpuri	AAP	AAP	Resignation
Kalyanpuri	AAP	AAP	Resignation
Chauhan Bangar	AAP	INC	Resignation

== See also ==
- Municipal Corporation of Delhi
