= Delhi Urban Shelter Improvement Board =

Delhi government agency for urban housing

- Delhi Urban Shelter Improvement Board
- DUSIB
- Predecessor: Government of Delhi
- Formation: April 1, 2010; 16 years ago
- Type: Governmental
- Headquarters: Delhi
- Region served: Delhi
- Website: delhishelterboard.in

Delhi Urban Shelter Improvement Board (DUSIB) is primarily responsible for improving the quality of the life of Slum & JJ Dwellers in the capital city of Delhi.

DUSIB provides Mobile Toilet Van for hire for day to day requirement of public gathering in social, religious and national functions on nominal rental. DUSIB also provides community halls on rental to the slum dwellers for organizing marriage and other social functions.

As of April 2022, DUSIB has constructed and is operating 195 Night shelters across Delhi in collaboration with various agencies. Some of these Night shelters are specifically for Families, Drug addicts & Women.

Chief Minister of Delhi is the chairperson of the board and Minister of Urban development is the vice chairperson.

== History ==
DUSIB came into existence after Delhi Urban Shelter Improvement Board Act, 2010 was passed by Delhi Legislative Assembly on 1 April 2010 and came in force by the orders of Lieutenant Governor of Delhi on 1 July 2010.

The Slum & JJ Department which was earlier part of Municipal Corporation of Delhi has now been transferred to this board. The Slum & JJ Department was not set up under any statute, but as part of the Municipal Corporation of Delhi in 1962. The department was entrusted with the work of operating the provisions of Slum Areas (Improvement & Clearance) Act, 1956.

In 1967, JJ wing was transferred to DDA and subsequently merged with Delhi Development Authority. However, Slum & JJ Department was transferred back & forth from Municipal Corporation of Delhi to Delhi Development Authority in between 1974 & 1980 and was with Municipal Corporation of Delhi since September 1992.
