= Mukesh Suryan =

Mayor of South Delhi
- In office 16 June 2021 – 21 May 2022
- Deputy: Pawan Sharma
- Preceded by: Anamika Mithilesh Singh

Councillor of the South Delhi Municipal Corporation
- Incumbent
- Assumed office 20 May 2017
- Constituency: Sagarpur West

Mukesh Suryan is an Indian politician who was a mayor of South Delhi Municipal Corporation (SDMC). He represented Sagarpur West ward in the Najafgarh Zone of SDMC. He is a member of Bharatiya Janata Party and hails from Uttar Pradesh.
