= Inderpuri =

- Neighborhood of Delhi
- Location in Delhi, India Inderpuri (India)
- Coordinates: 28.630261°N 77.147148°E
- Country: India
- State: Delhi
- District: Central Delhi

Languages
  - Official: Hindi
- Time zone: UTC+5:30 (IST)
- PIN: 110 012
- Planning agency: MCD

Inderpuri is a small colony located in the central part of New Delhi district. It lies between Naraina and New Rajinder Nagar area; it is located next to the renowned Pusa Institute.

== History ==
Inderpuri was developed on agricultural land acquired from the villagers of Dus-Ghara (Dasghara).

== Access ==
The Indira Gandhi International Airport is 12 km (domestic) and 16 km (international) from Inderpuri. The New Delhi railway station is 11 km away, and the Hazrat Nizamuddin Railway Station 19 km away. The Blue Line of the Delhi Metro has a stop at the Shadipur station within 3.4 km from Inderpuri. The closest metro station is Pink line metro station at Naraina Vihar within 1 km approximately.

== Politics ==
Inderpuri comes under the jurisdiction of Rajinder Nagar (Delhi Assembly constituency). The current MLA of the constituency is Umang Bajaj of the Bharatiya Janata Party.

== See also ==
- Neighbourhoods of Delhi
