= Molarband =

- Town
- Molarband
- Location in Delhi
- Coordinates: 28.50491°N 77.31203°E
- Country: India
- State: Delhi
- District: South East Delhi
- Founder: Municipal corporation of Delhi.

Government
  - Body: Municipal Corporation of Delhi

Population (2001)
  - Total: 39,267
- Demonym: Delhite

Languages
  - Official: Hindi, English
- Time zone: UTC+5:30 (IST)
- PIN: 110044
- Vehicle registration: DL 3

Molarband is a census town in area of Badarpur the South East Delhi district of Delhi, India.

== Demographics ==
As of 2001 India census, Molarband had a population of 39,267. Males constitute 56% of the population and females 44%. Molarband had an average literacy rate of 68%, higher than the national average of 59.5%: male literacy was 77% and female literacy was 58%. 18% of the population was under 6 years of age.
