= Naraina Village =

- Neighbourhood
- Location in Delhi, India
- Coordinates: 28.632141°N 77.138855°E
- Country: India
- State: Delhi
- District: New Delhi

Languages
  - Official: Hindi, English
- Time zone: UTC+5:30 (IST)
- PIN: 110028
- Lok Sabha constituency: New Delhi
- Civic agency: NDMC

Naraina Village is a village in New Delhi, India. It is a Tanwar/Tomar Rajput village.

== History ==
Naraina has derived its name from Raja Narain Pal Singh Tanwar, a Tomar Rajput ruler associated with the Tomara dynasty of Delhi. According to traditional Tomar genealogies, Raja Narain Pal Singh Tanwar is described as the 6th descendant of Anangpal Tomar. The Tomara dynasty, also referred to as Tomar or Tanwar, ruled parts of Delhi and present-day Haryana during the early medieval period.Historians associate the foundation of nearby Mahipalpur with Raja Mahipal Singh Tanwar, descendant of Raja Anagpal Singh Tomar, and belonging to the same Tanwar Rajput lineage. It is a Tanwar/Tomar Rajput village.

The Sultan Ghari monument was built in around 10th century by the Pratihara dynasty. Naraina has an ancient Hauz and Mahal, two historical monuments which reveal the habitation of this area during the seven capitals that existed in Delhi in historic times.

== Notable persons ==
- Karan Singh Tanwar, MLA of Delhi Cantonment (3 terms)
- Sandeep Singh Tanwar, Congress MLA Candidate
- Manish Singh Tanwar, BJP MLA Candidate
