= Bhati, Delhi =

Bhati Bhati Mines
- Village
- Location in Delhi, India
- Coordinates: 28.5549°N 77.1919°E
- Country: India
- State: Delhi
- District: South

Population (2001)
  - Total: 15,882

Languages
  - Official: Hindi, English
- Time zone: UTC+5:30 (IST)

Bhati is a census town in South district in the state of Delhi, India.

== Demographics ==
At the 2001 India census, Bhati had a population of 15,882. Males constituted 55% of the population and females 45%. Bhati had an average literacy rate of 47%, lower than the national average of 59.5%; with male literacy of 59% and female literacy of 33%. 18% of the population was under 6 years of age.
