= Delhi Cantonment =

Cantonment and Municipal Corporation in National Capital Territory of Delhi, India

Delhi Cantonment दिल्ली छावनी Delhi Cantt
- Neighbourhood of Delhi and militarised area
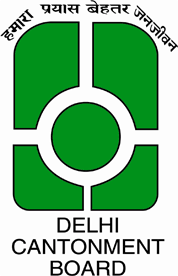
- Seal
- Motto: हमारा प्रयास बेहतर जनजीवन; Our effort for a better life
- Interactive map of Delhi Cantonment
- Country: India
- Union territory: Delhi
- District: New Delhi
- Lok Sabha constituency: New Delhi
- Legislative Assembly: Delhi Cantonment
- Established: 1914

Area
  - Total: 42.3 km^{2} (16.3 sq mi)

Population (2011)
  - Total: 110,351
  - Density: 2,610/km^{2} (6,760/sq mi)

Languages
  - Official: Hindi, English
- Time zone: UTC+5:30 (IST)
- PIN: 110010
- Telephone code: 91-011
- Website: Official website

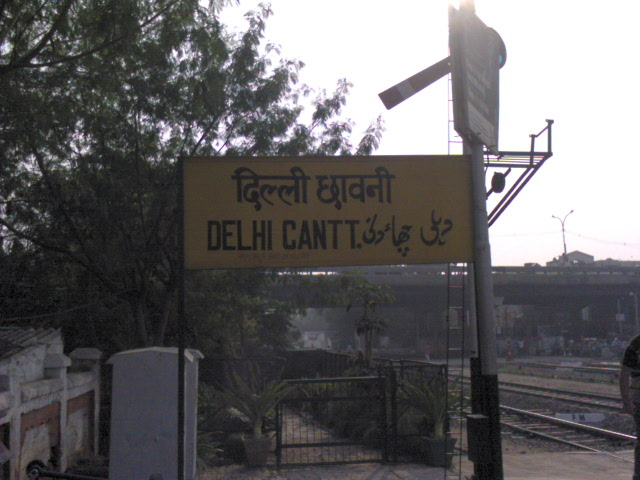
Delhi Cantonment railway station

Delhi Cantonment (ISO: Dillī Chāvanī; popularly referred to as Delhi Cantt) is a Class I Cantonment Board in New Delhi established in 1914. The area of the Cantonment is 10,452 acres (42.30 km^{2}) and its population, as per the 2011 census, is 110,351.

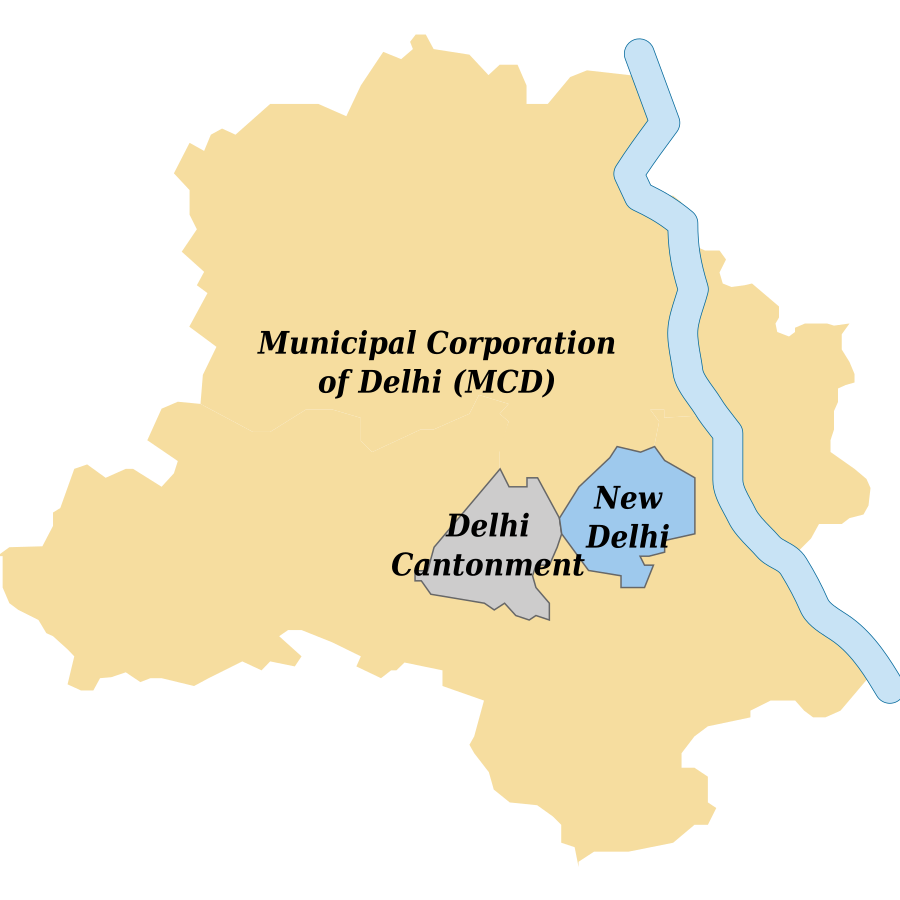
Municipalities of Delhi

The Cantonment is governed by the Cantonments Act, 2006 while various policy letters and instructions from the Ministry of Defence pertaining to the area are issued from time to time. Although the board functions as a local municipal body, it remains under the administrative control of the Directorate General Defence Estates, New Delhi and Principal Director, Defence Estates, Western Command, Chandigarh.

This cantonment also houses the headquarters of Indian Army and Indian Navy namely Thal Sena Bhawan and Nausena Bhawan. It is one of three local bodies in the National Capital Territory of Delhi, the others being Municipal Corporation of Delhi and New Delhi Municipal Council.

== History ==
Cantonments in Delhi and Ahmedabad were originally established during the British Raj. The Delhi Cantonment was constructed by acquiring parts of the land of the Naraina Village and houses the headquarters of the Indian Army Headquarters, the Army Golf Course; the Defence Services Officers Institute; military housing; Air Force and Army Public Schools; and various other defence-related installations. The cantonment also houses the Army Hospital Research and Referral, a tertiary care medical centre of the Indian Armed Forces.

There is a railway station within the cantonment, Delhi Cantonment railway station, from where trains depart for various parts of the country.

== Demographics ==
Historical population
Year	Pop.	±%
1941	23,140	—
1951	40,950	+77.0%
1961	36,105	−11.8%
1971	57,339	+58.8%
1981	85,166	+48.5%
1991	94,393	+10.8%
2001	124,917	+32.3%
2011	110,351	−11.7%
Source: Government of India

In the 2001 India census Delhi Cantt. had a population of 124,452. Males constituted 61% of the population and females 39%. Delhi Cantt. has an average literacy rate of 77%, higher than the national average of 74%: male literacy is 83% and, female literacy is 68%. In Delhi Cantt., 12% of the population is under 6 years of age.

At the 2011 India census Delhi Cantt. had a population of 116,352. Males constituted ≈58% (67,703) of the population and females constituted ≈42% (48,649). Delhi Cantt. has an average literacy rate of 91.11%, higher than the national average of 79.9%: male literacy is 94.54% and, female literacy is 86.26%. In Delhi Cantt., 11.36% of the population is under 6 years of age.

== Other ==
Brar Square crematorium is located in Delhi Cantonment.

== Transport ==
Delhi Cantonment is well connected by road, rail, and air. Indira Gandhi International Airport is about 5 kilometres (3.1 mi) from Delhi Cantonment. Its nearest metro stations are Delhi Cantt and Sadar Bazaar Cantt on the Pink Line, Shankar Vihar on the Magenta Line, and Dhaula Kuan on the Airport Express Line. Delhi Cantonment has a railway station. Almost all the trains plying from Delhi towards Rajasthan or Gujarat have either a stop here or originates from this station itself.

It is easily accessible by road and local bus to the residents of nearby residential neighbourhoods such as Aerocity, Dhaula Kuan, DU South Campus, Chanakyapuri, Moti Bagh, Vasant Vihar, Vasant Kunj, Palam, Dabri, Dwarka, Tilak Nagar, Hari Nagar, Mayapuri, Sagarpur, Naraina, Inderpuri and Janakpuri.
