= South Delhi Municipal Corporation =

Municipal corporation of South Delhi

Type
- Type: Municipal Corporation

History
- Established: 2012
- Disbanded: 2022
- Preceded by: Municipal Corporation of Delhi
- Succeeded by: Municipal Corporation of Delhi

Structure
- Seats: 104
- Length of term: 5 years

Elections
- Voting system: First-past-the-post
- Last election: 23 April 2017

Website
- mcdonline.nic.in/sdmcportal

South Delhi Municipal Corporation within the NCT

South Delhi Municipal Corporation (SDMC) was one of the municipal corporations in Delhi, India, that was established after the former Municipal Corporation of Delhi was trifurcated in 2012. The SDMC had jurisdiction over an area spanning 656.91 km^{2} (253.63 sq mi), which was further divided into four zones: Central, South, West, and Najafgarh. Comprising 104 wards, the EDMC catered to a population of almost 5,600,000 (56 lakhs) in Delhi.

Before its dissolution in May 2022, it was one of five local bodies in the National Capital Territory of Delhi, alongside the North Delhi Municipal Corporation, East Delhi Municipal Corporation, New Delhi Municipal Council, and the Delhi Cantonment Board.

On 22 May 2022, the three former municipal corporations—North Delhi, South Delhi, and East Delhi—were reunified into the Municipal Corporation of Delhi.

== List of mayors ==
#	Name	Term		Election	Party
1	Savita Gupta	2 May 2012	16 April 2013	2012	Bharatiya Janata Party
2	Sarita Chaudhary	16 April 2013	29 April 2014	2012	Bharatiya Janata Party
3	Khushi Ram Chunar	29 April 2014	24 April 2015	2012	Bharatiya Janata Party
4	Subhash Arya	24 April 2015	27 April 2016	2012	Bharatiya Janata Party
5	Shyam Sharma	27 April 2016	19 May 2017	2012	Bharatiya Janata Party
6	Kamaljeet Sehrawat	19 May 2017	26 April 2018	2017	Bharatiya Janata Party
7	Narendra Chawla	26 April 2018	26 April 2019	2017	Bharatiya Janata Party
8	Sunita Kangra	26 April 2019	24 June 2020	2017	Bharatiya Janata Party
9	Anamika Singh	24 June 2020	16 June 2021	2017	Bharatiya Janata Party
10	Mukesh Suryan	16 June 2021	22 May 2022	2017	Bharatiya Janata Party

== 2017 Election ==
Party	Symbol	Seats won	Seats +/−	Vote %
Bharatiya Janata Party		70	▲26	34.87
Aam Aadmi Party		16	▲16	26.44
Indian National Congress		12	▼17	20.29
Others		6	▼25	18.40
Total		104	-	100

== 2012 Election ==
Party	Symbol	Wards won
Bharatiya Janata Party		44
Indian National Congress		29
Bahujan Samaj Party		5
Others		26
Total		104
