= North Delhi Municipal Corporation =

Governing civic body of North Delhi

Type
- Type: Municipal Corporation

History
- Established: 2012
- Disbanded: 2022
- Preceded by: Municipal Corporation of Delhi
- Succeeded by: Municipal Corporation of Delhi

Structure
- Seats: 104
- Length of term: 5 years

Elections
- Voting system: First-past-the-post
- Last election: 23 April 2017

Website
- mcdonline.nic.in/ndmcportal/

North Delhi Municipal Corporation within the NCT

North Delhi Municipal Corporation (NDMC) was one of the municipal corporations in Delhi, India that was established after the former Municipal Corporation of Delhi was trifurcated in 2012. The NDMC had jurisdiction over an area spanning 605 km^{2} (234 sq mi), which was further divided into six zones: Rohini, Civil Lines, Karol Bagh, City-SP, Keshav Puram and Narela. Comprising 104 Wards, it catered to a population of almost 6,200,000 (6.2 million) in Delhi

Before its dissolution in May 2022, it was one of five local bodies in the National Capital Territory of Delhi, alongside the East Delhi Municipal Corporation, South Delhi Municipal Corporation, New Delhi Municipal Council, and the Delhi Cantonment Board.

On 22 May 2022, the three former municipal corporations—North Delhi, South Delhi, and East Delhi—were reunified into the Municipal Corporation of Delhi.

== 2017 Election ==
Party	Symbol	Seats won	Seats +/−	Vote %
Bharatiya Janata Party		64	▲5	35.63
Aam Aadmi Party		21	▲21	27.88
Indian National Congress		16	▼13	20.73
Others		3	▼13	15.76
Total		104	-	100

== 2012 Election ==
North Delhi Municipal Corporation
Party	Symbol	Wards won
Bharatiya Janata Party		59
Indian National Congress		29
Bahujan Samaj Party		7
Others		9
Total		104
