= East Delhi Municipal Corporation =

Governing civic body of East Delhi

Type
- Type: Municipal Corporation

History
- Established: 2012
- Disbanded: 2022
- Preceded by: Municipal Corporation of Delhi
- Succeeded by: Municipal Corporation of Delhi

Structure
- Seats: 64
- Length of term: 5 years

Elections
- Voting system: First-past-the-post
- Last election: 23 April 2017

Website
- mcdonline.nic.in/edmcportal/

East Delhi Municipal Corporation within the NCT

East Delhi Municipal Corporation (EDMC) was one of the municipal corporations in Delhi, India, that was established after the former Municipal Corporation of Delhi was trifurcated in 2012. The EDMC had jurisdiction over an area spanning 140 km^{2} (54 sq mi), which was further divided into two zones: Shahdara North and Shahdara East. Comprising 64 wards, the EDMC catered to a population of almost 1,800,000 (18 lakhs) in Delhi.

Before its dissolution in 2022, it was one of five local bodies in the National Capital Territory of Delhi, alongside the North Delhi Municipal Corporation, South Delhi Municipal Corporation, New Delhi Municipal Council, and the Delhi Cantonment Board.

On 22 May 2022, the three former municipal corporations—North Delhi, South Delhi, and East Delhi—were reunified into the Municipal Corporation of Delhi.

== 2017 Election ==
Party	Symbol	Seats won	Seats +/−	Vote %
Bharatiya Janata Party		47	▲12	38.61
Aam Aadmi Party		12	▲12	23.40
Indian National Congress		3	▼16	22.84
Others		2	▼8	15.15
Total		64	-	100

== 2012 Election ==
Party	Symbol	Wards won
Bharatiya Janata Party		35
Indian National Congress		19
Bahujan Samaj Party		3
Others		7
Total		64
