= New Delhi Municipal Council =

Municipal Corporation in National Capital Territory of Delhi, India

- Civic body of Delhi
- Seal of the NDMC

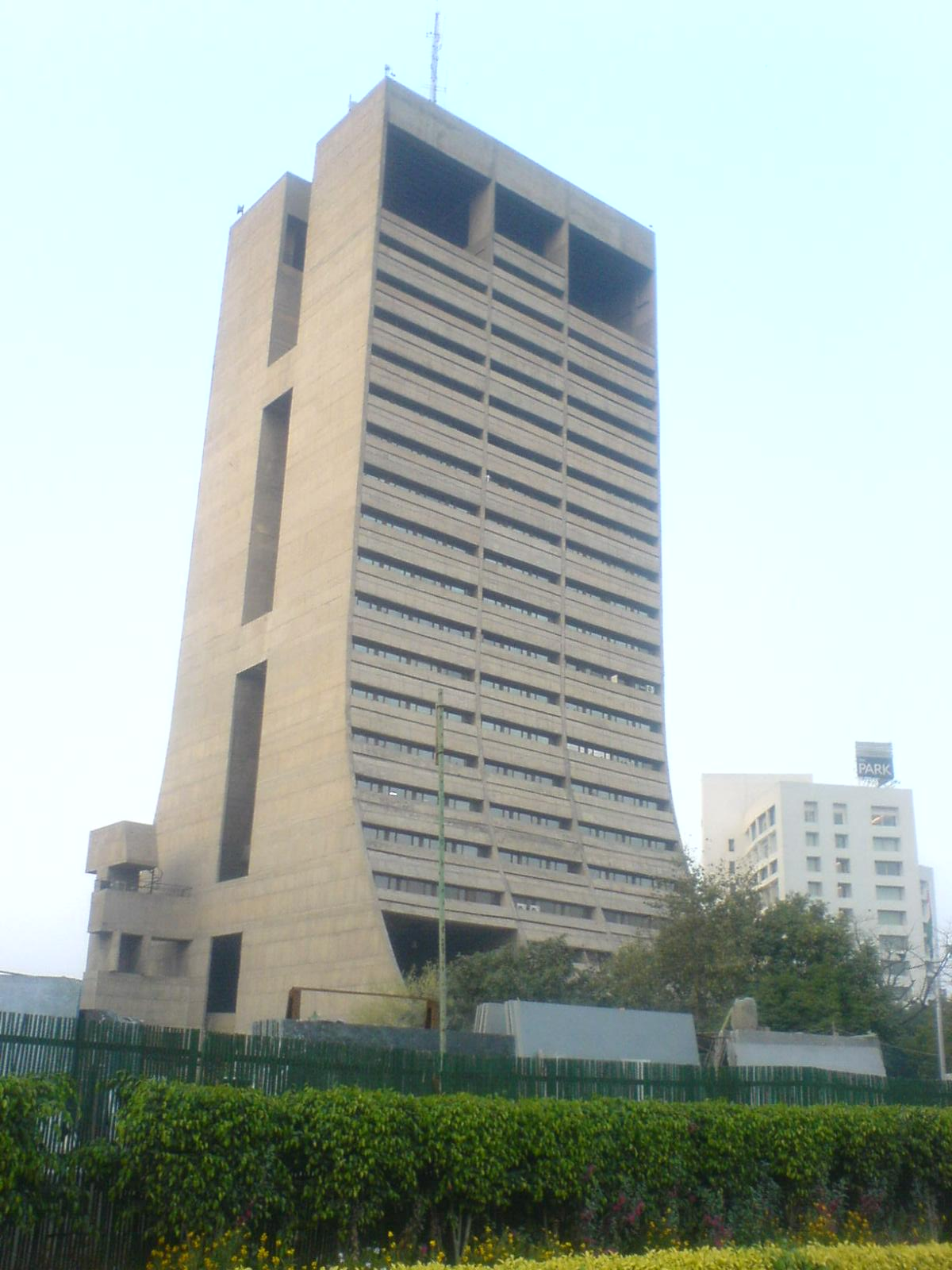
- NDMC headquarter in Connaught Place, New Delhi
- Formation: 12 December 1911; 114 years ago as New Delhi Municipal Committee
- Headquarters: Palika Kendra Parliament Street, New Delhi - 110001
- Secretary General: Rahul Singh IAS
- Chairperson: Manoj Kumar Dwivedi, IAS
- Vice Chairperson: Kuljeet Chahal (BJP)
- Member: Pravesh Verma (BJP); Virender Singh Kadian (AAP); Bansuri Swaraj (BJP)
- Budget: ₹5,953 crore (US$640 million) (2026 - 2027)
- Website: www.ndmc.gov.in
- Formerly called: New Delhi Municipal Committee (1911-1995)

New Delhi Municipal Council (NDMC; ISO: Naī Dillī Nagarapālikā Pariṣad) is the municipal council of the city of New Delhi, Delhi, in the National Capital Region, India. It covers an area of 42.7 km^{2} under its administration, which is commonly referred as Lutyens' Delhi.

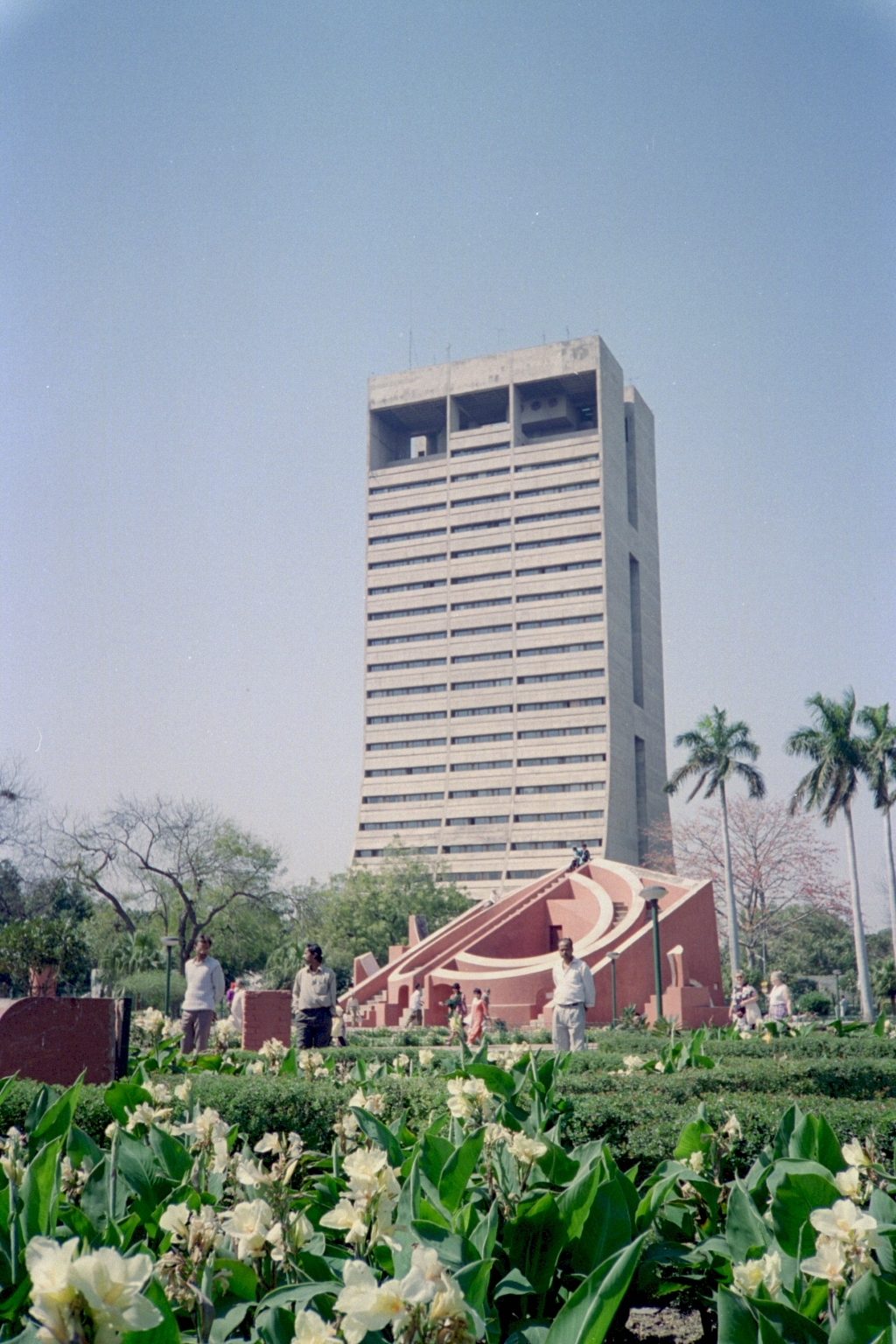
NDMC Head Office, Palika Kendra Parliament Street, New Delhi.

The only owner is the Government of India and about 80% of buildings in New Delhi are owned by the New Delhi Municipal Council area. It is governed by a council headed by a chairperson, who is usually a career civil servant and holds the rank of Joint Secretary to Government of India appointed by the Government of India. The council also includes the Chief Minister of Delhi as an Ex officio member.

It is one of three local bodies in the National Capital Territory of Delhi, the others being Municipal Corporation of Delhi and Delhi Cantonment Board.

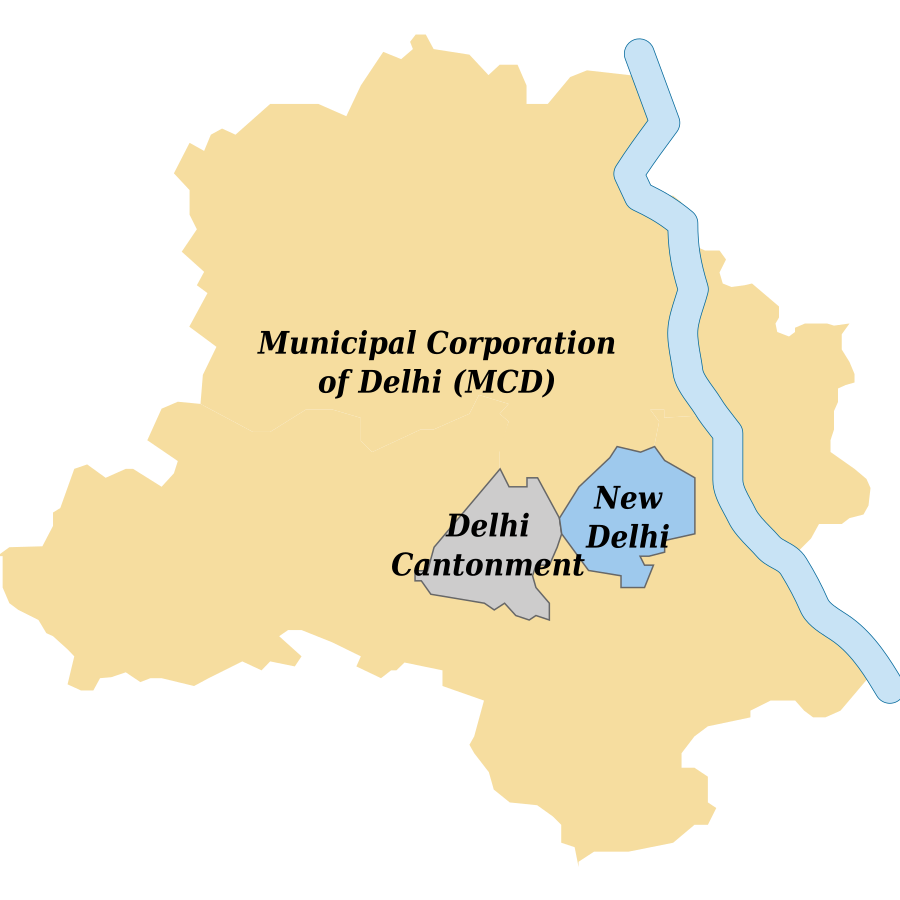
Municipalities of Delhi

== History ==
NDMC has its origins in the Imperial Delhi Committee which was constituted on 25 March 1913 to overlook the construction of the new capital of India. Thereafter in February 1916 the Chief Commissioner, Delhi, created the Raisina Municipal Committee, which was upgraded to a 2nd class Municipality under the Punjab Municipal Act on 7 April 1925. Then on 22 February 1927, the Committee passed a resolution adopting the name "New Delhi" giving it the name, "New Delhi Municipal Committee", approved by Chief Commissioner on 16 March 1927. In May 1994, the NDMC Act 1994, replaced the Punjab Municipal Act 1911, and the Committee was renamed as the New Delhi Municipal Council.

NDMC's headquarters building, known as Palika Kendra, was built in 1984, and was the tallest building in the city at that time.

== Controversies ==
In 2014, 17 NDMC employees, including members of the civil department, were suspended after contractor-led sting operations uncovered evidence of corruption and unethical behavior. Video and audio recordings suggested systematic malpractice, mostly involving lower-ranking staff but implicating at least one assistant engineer. Investigations were launched to confirm the veracity of the evidence and to determine accountability.

According to The Indian Express, in 2023, sanitation conditions on several footpaths under the New Delhi Municipal Council came under scrutiny, with reports highlighting issues such as encroachments, garbage accumulation, and inadequate maintenance affecting pedestrian movement and public hygiene.

According to The Indian Express In February 2023, the Ministry of Home Affairs approved the regularization of approximately 4,500 NDMC employees. This decision aimed to address long-standing demands for job security among Group C employees. Delhi Chief Minister Arvind Kejriwal had advocated for the approval of recruitment rules to facilitate this regularization process.

== Initiative ==
NDMC Smart City Limited is a strategic initiative by the New Delhi Municipal Council (NDMC) to develop New Delhi into a technologically advanced and sustainable urban area. Incorporated on July 28, 2016, as a Special Purpose Vehicle (SPV), it is wholly owned by NDMC and was established under the Smart Cities Mission of the Ministry of Urban Development, Government of India. The company's focus is on enhancing urban life through smart solutions that integrate technology with infrastructure and services. This includes initiatives in digitalization, waste management, and sustainable development, aiming to improve the quality of life for residents and make the city more efficient, safe, and resilient.

== List of Chairperson of the New Delhi Municipal Council ==
No.	Name	From	To	Ref
1	P. C. Lyon	16 October 1905	1909	
2	B.P. Misra	1994	1997	
3	Subhash Sharma	1997	2000	
4	B.P. Singhal	2000	2002	
5	P.M. Singh	2002	2004	
6	Sindhushree Khullar	2004	2007	
7	Parimal Rai	2007	2011	
8	Archana Arora	2011	2013	
9	Jalaj Srivastava	2013	2015	
10	Naresh Kumar	2015	2019	
11	Dharmendra	2019	2022	
12	Bhupinder S. Bhalla	2022	2022	
13	Amit Yadav	2022	2024	
14	Keshav Chandra	30 October 2024	2026	
15	Manoj Kumar Dwivedi	August 5, 2026	Incumbent	

== Departments ==
NDMC has 32 departments:

- Architecture Department
- Audit Department
- Accounts Department
- Civil Engineering Department
- Commercial Department
- Council Secretariat Department
- Electricity Department
- Enforcement Department
- Estate I Department
- Estate II Department
- Enforcement (B.R) Department
- Education Department
- Fire Department
- Finance Department
- General Administration Department
- Horticulture Department
- Information Technology Department
- Law Department

== Municipal Housing Department ==
Municipal Housing Department of the New Delhi Municipal Council (NDMC) manages and oversees housing facilities and related infrastructure for NDMC employees and other stakeholders within the NDMC jurisdiction. The department ensures the provision, maintenance, and allocation of residential and non-residential properties owned by the council, contributing to efficient urban management and employee welfare.

Prominent Housing Locations:

- Palika Awas
- Palika Kunj
- Palika Niwas
- Palika Amrit Kaal Niwas
- Palika Gram
- Palika Sadan
- Palika Niketan
- Palika Vas
- Palika Vihar

== Medical Services Department ==
New Delhi Municipal Council (NDMC) oversees a range of medical facilities in the region, including the Charak Palika Hospital and the Palika Maternity Hospital. These institutions are equipped to provide comprehensive healthcare services, from early diagnosis and treatment to rehabilitation and preventive care. The NDMC's commitment to healthcare is also evident in its operation of two polyclinics and numerous dispensaries across the city, ensuring accessible medical services for all residents within its jurisdiction.

- Public Health Department
- Project Department
- Personnel Department
- Public Relations Department
- Property Tax Department
- Parking Management Department
- Property Tax Department
- Quality Control and Technical Audit Department
- Revenue & Power Department
- Security Department
- Training Department
- Vigilance Department
- Welfare Department
