= Municipal Corporation of Delhi =

Municipal Corporation in National Capital Territory of Delhi, India

Coordinates: 28.566°N 77.245°E

- Coat of arms

Type
- Type: Municipal corporation of Delhi
- Term limits: 5 years
- Established: 7 April 1958

Leadership
- Mayor: Pravesh Wahi, BJP since 29 April 2026
- Deputy Mayor: Dr. Monika Pant, BJP since 25 April 2025
- Municipal Commissioner: Sanjeev Khirwar, IAS since 21 January 2026

Structure
- Seats: 250 (elected) + 10 (nominated)
- Political groups: Government (138): BJP (138); Official Opposition (102): AAP (102); Other Opposition (10): INC (9); AIFB (1)

Elections
- Voting system: First-past-the-post
- Last election: 4 December 2022
- Next election: 2027

Motto
- Tamasō Mā Jyōtirgamaya; Let the light shine out of darkness

Meeting place
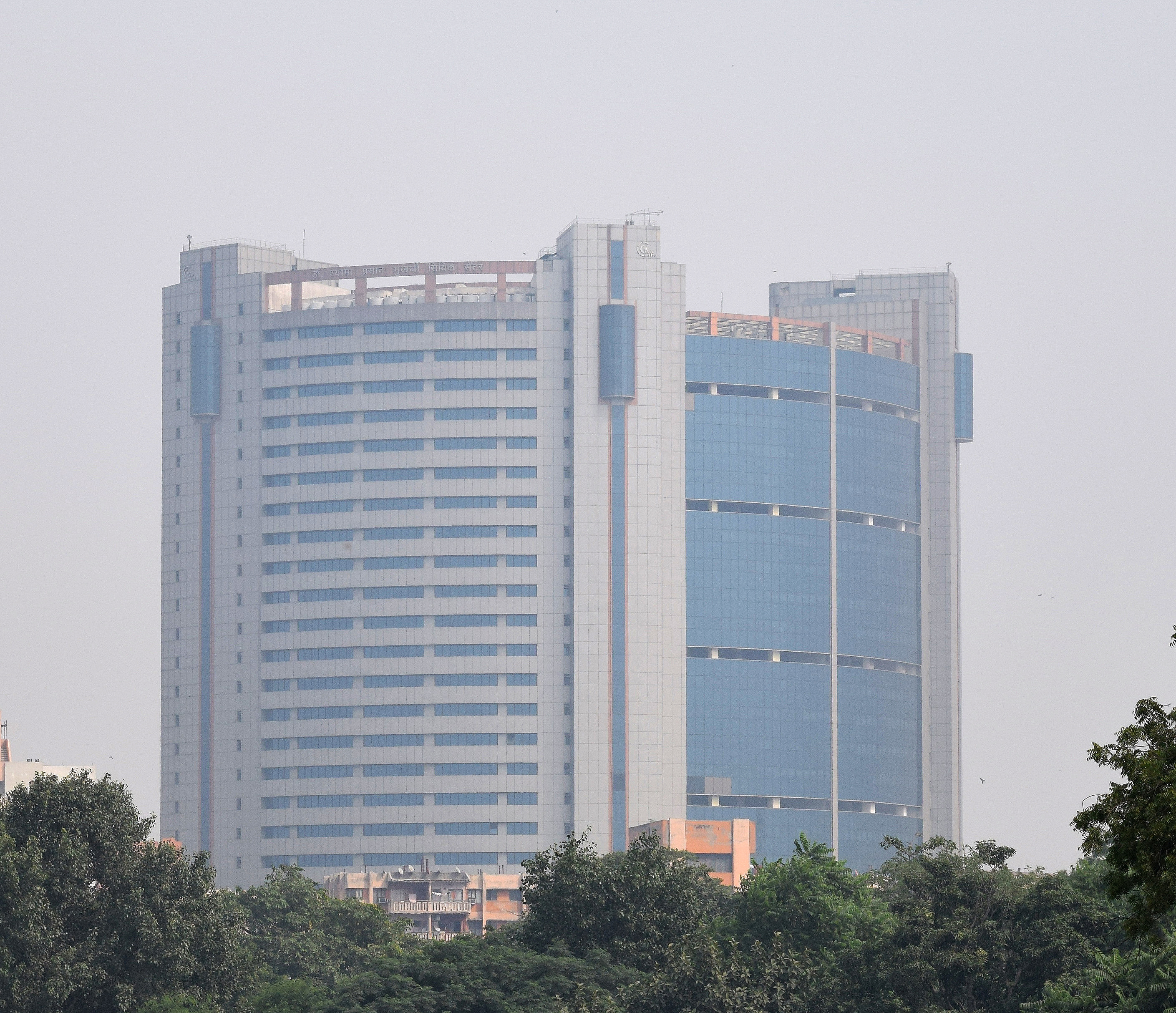
- MCD Civic Centre, Minto Road, New Delhi

Website
- mcdonline.nic.in

The Municipal Corporation of Delhi (MCD) is the municipal corporation that governs most of Delhi, in the National Capital Region a union territory of India. The MCD is among the largest municipal bodies in the world providing civic services to a population of about 20 million citizens in Delhi, apart from the capital New Delhi and Delhi Cantonment.

It is headed by the Mayor of Delhi, who presides over elected councillors from 250 wards. The municipal corporation covers an area of 1,397.3 km^{2} (539.5 mi^{2}). The annual budget of the corporation for the fiscal year 2025-26 exceeds ₹17,000 crore (approximately US$2 billion).

MCD is one of three municipalities in the National Capital Territory of Delhi, the others being the New Delhi Municipal Council (NDMC), which administers the New Delhi municipality, and the Delhi Cantonment Board, which administers the Delhi Cantonment. It is the largest and only municipality of Delhi which is directly elected by the people.

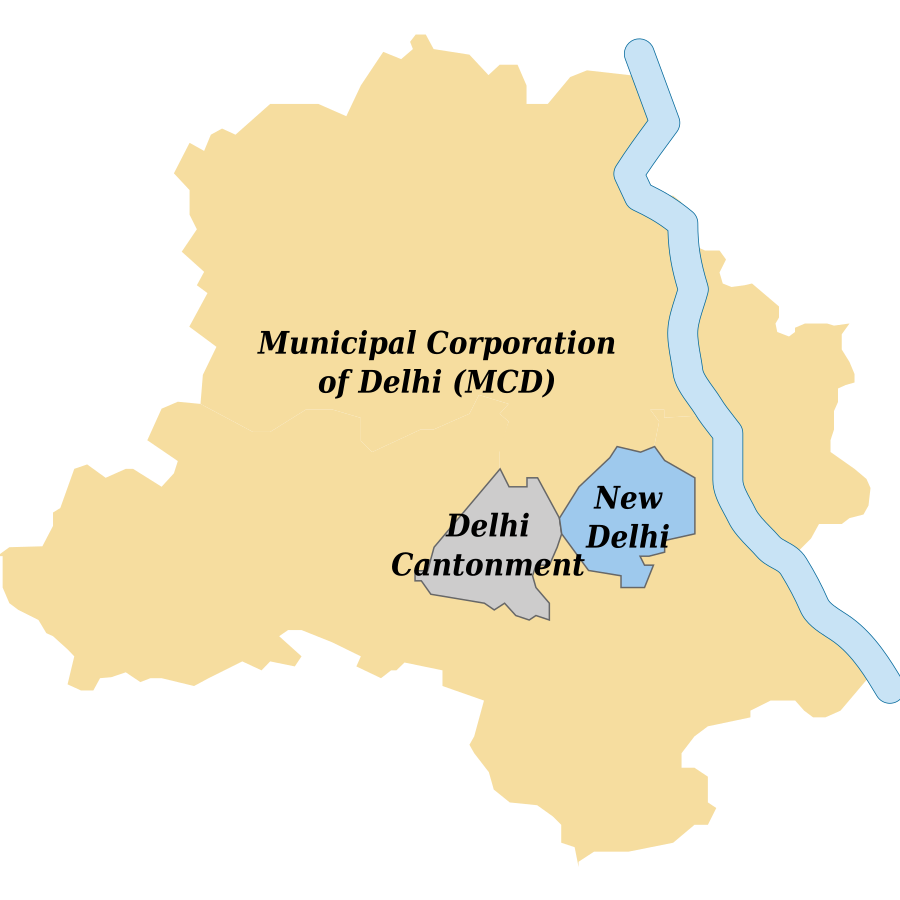
Geographic ambit of the three municipal corporations of Delhi

== History ==
MCD came into existence on 7 April 1958 under an Act of Parliament. Previously, the DMC (Delhi Municipal Committee) was the principal civic body of Delhi. Guru Radha Kishan served for the longest consecutive period as a councillor of the MCD (initially referred to as the Delhi Municipal Committee). Trilok Chand Sharma served as the first elected Mayor of Delhi. Thereafter, the municipal body has always been alive in its constitution and functioning to the growing needs of citizens. The 1993 amendment of the Act brought about fundamental changes in composition, functions, governance and administration of the corporation.

=== Trifurcation ===
On 13 January 2012, the Municipal Corporation of Delhi was trifurcated into three smaller municipal corporations. The North Delhi Municipal Corporation and South Delhi Municipal Corporation each contained 104 municipal wards, whereas the smaller East Delhi Municipal Corporation contained 64 wards.

=== Reunification ===
In March 2022, the Delhi State Election Commission indefinitely deferred the municipal elections that were scheduled for April 2022. On 22 March, the Union Government approved the Delhi Municipal Corporation (Amendment) Bill to merge the three municipal corporations into a single unified body. The Lok Sabha passed the Bill on 30 March 2022, whereafter it was passed by the Rajya Sabha on 5 April 2022. The unified Municipal Corporation of Delhi formally came into existence on 22 May 2022 with Ashwani Kumar and Gyanesh Bharti taking charge as Special Officer and Commissioner, respectively. Elections were held on 4 December 2022, with Aam Aadmi Party winning the majority of seats. However in 2025, Bharatiya Janata Party gained control of the corporation.

== Controversies ==
In September 2024, an audit of 16 public toilets in north-west and south Delhi by the news outlet Newslaundry found that 11 had severe issues, such as being locked, unclean or poorly maintained, despite an earlier Delhi High Court order directing the Municipal Corporation of Delhi and the Delhi Development Authority to ensure cleanliness and sanitation.

In 2023, the Delhi Commission for Women summoned officials of the municipal corporation and the Delhi Urban Shelter Improvement Board over the condition of toilet complexes they managed in Kalyanpuri and Trilokpuri, which the commission described as being in a poor state.

== Municipal zones in Delhi ==
The entire MCD area is divided into 12 zones:

- Central Zone
- City–SP Zone
- Civil Lines Zone
- Karol Bagh Zone
- Keshav Puram Zone
- Najafgarh Zone
- Narela Zone
- North Shahdara Zone
- Rohini Zone
- South Shahdara Zone
- South Zone
- West Zone

Ward Committees of Delhi MCD

Each zone has a ward committee comprising councillors elected from the respective wards. These committees are designed to decentralise administrative powers and address local issues with tailored, community-specific solutions.

== List of Mayors ==
No.	Name	Party	Term	Ref.
1	Shelly Oberoi	Aam Aadmi Party	22 February 2023 – 26 April 2023	
2	Shelly Oberoi	Aam Aadmi Party	26 April 2023 – 14 November 2024	
3	Mahesh Kumar Khichi	Aam Aadmi Party	14 November 2024 – 25 April 2025	
4	Raja Iqbal Singh	Bharatiya Janata Party	25 April 2025 – 29 April 2026	
5	Pravesh Wahi	Bharatiya Janata Party	29 April 2026 - Incumbent	

== List of Deputy mayors ==
No.	Name	Party	Term	Ref.
1	Aaley Mohammad Iqbal	Aam Aadmi Party	22 February 2023 – 26 April 2023	
2	Aaley Mohammad Iqbal	Aam Aadmi Party	26 April 2023 – 14 November 2024	
3	Ravinder Bharadwaj	Aam Aadmi Party	14 November 2024 – 25 April 2025	
4	Jai Bhagwan Yadav	Bharatiya Janata Party	25 April 2025–29 April 2026	
5	Dr. Monika Pant	Bharatiya Janata Party	29 April 2026 - Incumbent	

== Standing Committee ==
The Standing Committee is the highest decision-making executive body of the MCD, comprising 18 members. It oversees the corporation's financial functions, approves projects, and is responsible for discussing, finalizing, and implementing policies for the capital city. Additionally, the committee has the authority to appoint sub-committees to address specific issues such as education, environment, and parking, as well as to draft and enforce regulations.

Six members of the Standing Committee are elected directly by the House, while the remaining 12 are selected by the ward committees. The committee includes a chairperson and a deputy chairperson, both elected from among its members. The political party with a majority in the Standing Committee holds significant control over the House's policy and financial decisions.

== Demographics ==
Per the 2011 census of India, the Delhi Municipal Corporation governs a population of 11,007,835. Males constitute 55% of the population and females 45%. The corporation has an average literacy rate of 87.6%, higher than the national average of 74.0%: male literacy is 91.44% and, female literacy is 83.20%. In Delhi Municipal Corporation, 13% of the population is under 6 years of age.

== Elections ==
=== 2022 election ===
Results were announced on 7 December 2022.

Parties	Popular vote			Seats		
Parties	Votes	%	± %	Contested	Won	+/-
Aam Aadmi Party	3,084,957	42.05	▲15.82	250	134	▲85
Bharatiya Janata Party	2,867,472	39.09	▲3.01	250	104	▼77
Indian National Congress	856,593	11.68	▼9.41	247	9	▼22
Independent	253,631	3.46			3	▼3
Others	215,627	2.94			0	▼5
NOTA	57,545	0.78				
Total	7,335,825	100			250	

== See also ==
- Delhi Cantonment Board
- New Delhi Municipal Council
