= Haqeeqat =

Haqeeqat may refer to:

- Haqeeqat (1964 film), a 1964 Indian Bollywood film
- Haqeeqat (1985 film), a 1985 Indian Bollywood film
- Haqeeqat (1995 film), a 1995 Indian Bollywood film
- Haqeeqat (Indian TV series), an Indian television docudrama series
- Haqeeqat (2019 TV series), a Pakistani anthology television series
- Haqeeqat (book), the Hindi translation of a controversial book by M. G. Mathew
- Haqiqat Rai, a Hindu religious figure
- Haqiqat Singh Kanhaiya, a Sikh warrior

== See also ==
- Haqiqa or haqiqa, truth or reality in Sufism
- Seetharama Raju, a 1999 Indian Telugu film, Hindi title Ek Aur Haqeeqat (lit. 'One More Haqeeqat [Reality]')
- Haqiqat Nagar, neighborhood in northwest Delhi, India
