= Emmanuel Society =

The Emmanuel Society was founded in 1960 by the Archbishop M. A. Thomas. The headquarters of the Emmanuel Society in India is in Kota, Rajasthan. The society runs various schools in different districts of Rajasthan under the name of Emmanuel Mission Schools. These schools are Christian schools and the administration consist of Protestant Christians. This society also runs orphanages in Kota. The founder of the society got the president award for services to the society and the nation.

Following publication in 2006 of Haqeeqat, a book written by a Christian Evangelist, warrants were issued for the arrest of Archbishop Thomas and his son.
