= Harijan Sevak Sangh =

Indian non-profit organisation

- Formation: 30 September 1932 (94 years ago) Pune, India
- Founder: Mahatma Gandhi
- Headquarters: Gandhi Ashram, Kingsway, Delhi (today Rajpath, Delhi)
- President: Prof. Dr. Sankar Kumar Sanyal
- Website: gandhicreationhss.org

Harijan Sevak Sangh, formerly All India Anti Untouchability League, is a non-profit organisation founded by Mahatma Gandhi in 1932 to eradicate untouchability in India, working for Harijan or Dalit people and upliftment of Depressed Class of India. It is headquartered at Kingsway Camp in Delhi, with branches in 26 states across India.

== History ==
After the Second Round Table Conference, British government agreed to give Communal Award to the depressed classes on the request of B. R. Ambedkar. Gandhi opposed the government's decision which he considered would divide the Hindu society and subsequently went on an indefinite fast in Yerwada Jail. He ended his fast after signed Poona Pact with Ambedkar on 24 September 1932. On 30 September, Gandhi founded All India Anti Untouchability League, to remove untouchability in the society, which later renamed as Harijan Sevak Sangh ("Servants of Harijan Society"). At the time industrialist Ghanshyam Das Birla was its founding president with Amritlal Takkar as its secretary.

Harijan Sevak Sangh runs two schools in the state of Tamil Nadu, a residential middle school in Villupuram district and N M R Subbaraman memorial residential primary school in Madurai. The school in Villupuram was set up in 1993 and currently has 180 scheduled caste and 109 other backward classes students. The students mostly belong to migrant labourers. The school has got 9 teaching and non-teaching staff. The Madurai's school was built in 1979. It presently has 5 teaching and non-teaching faculty members.

== Headquarters ==
The Sangh is headquartered at Kingsway Camp in Delhi. It was Valmiki Bhawan within the campus, which functioned as Gandhiji's one-room ashram, Kasturba Gandhi and their children stayed at the nearby Kasturba Kutir, between April 1946 and June 1947, before he moved to Birla House. Today, the 20-acre campus includes the Gandhi ashram, Harijan Basti, Lala Hans Raj Gupta Industrial Training Institute and also has a residential school for boys and girls. Its headquarters, Gandhi Ashram, Kingsway Camp is listed as Gandhian Heritage Site by the Ministry of Culture, Govt. of India.

== Presidents ==
Complete list of presidents of Harijan Sevak Sangh:

Sr. No.	Image	Name	Start of Term	End of Term
1		Ghanshyamdas Birla	September 1932	April 1959
2		Rameshwari Nehru	April 1959	November 1965
3		Viyogī Hari	November 1965	May 1975
4		Shyamlal	June 1975	October 1978
5		R. K. Yarde	December 1978	April 1983
6		Nirmala Deshpande	June 1983	May 2008
7		Radhakrishn Malviya	May 2008	February 2013
8		Shankar Kumar Sanyal	April 2013	contd. till now

== Activities ==
The Sangh helped the depressed classes to access public places such as temples, schools, roads and water resources, also conducted inter dining and inter caste marriages. It constructed and maintains several schools and hostels across the country.

In 1939, Harijan Sevak Sangh of Tamil Nadu headed by A. Vaidyanatha Iyer entered the Meenakshi Amman Temple in Madurai, with members of depressed class including P. Kakkan despite opposition from the upper caste Hindus. The Sangh led by Iyer organised several temple entry movements in other Parts of Tamil Nadu and in Travancore. Through their movements, more than 100 temples were opened to all sections of the society.

== Bibliography ==
- Viyogī Hari (1971). History of the Harijan Sevak Sangh, 1932–1968. Harijan Sevak Sangh.
