= Coronation Park, Delhi =

Park in Delhi, India

Coronation Park
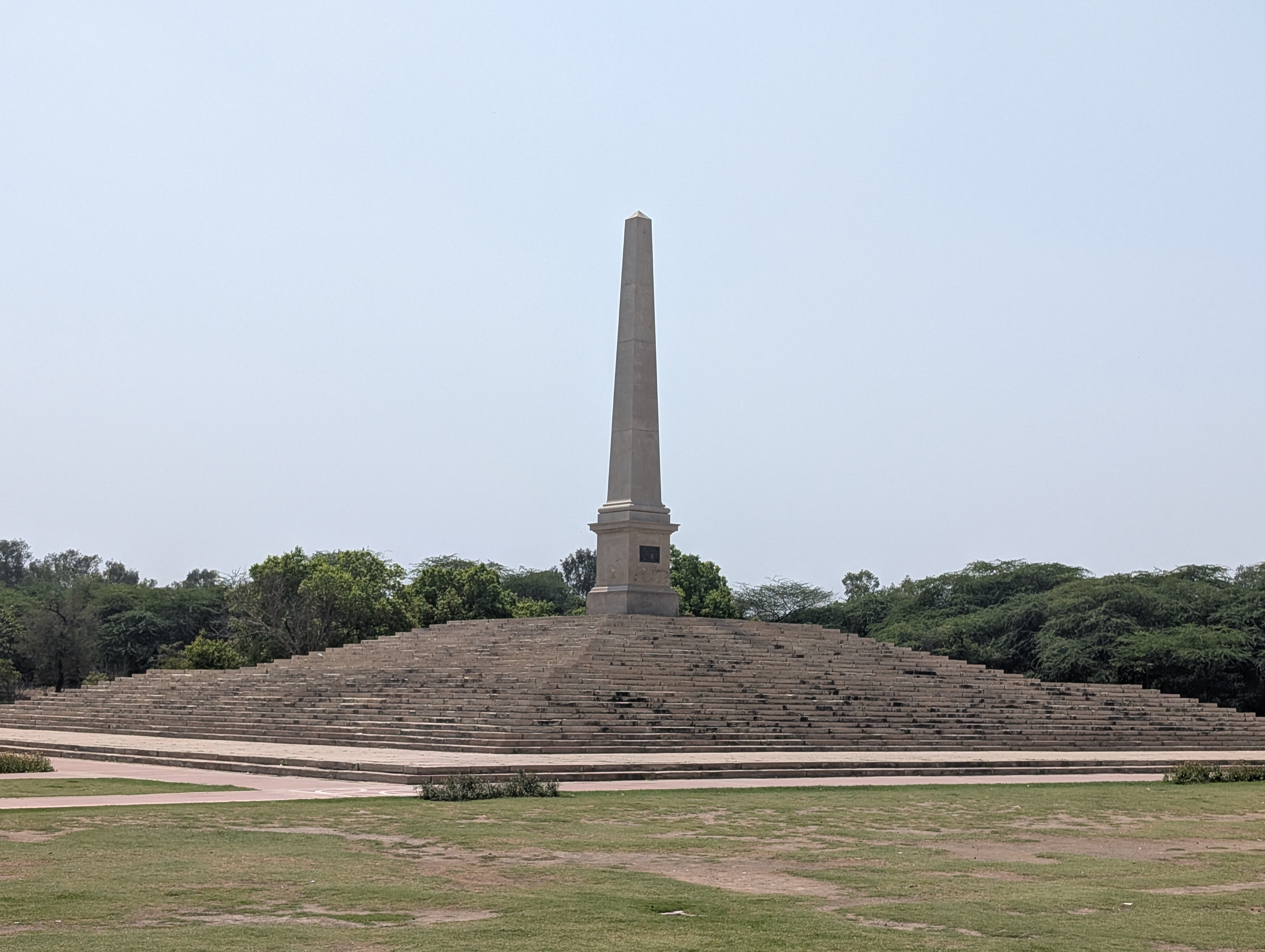
- The Coronation Memorial in Coronation Park
- Interactive map of Coronation Park
- Type: Urban park
- Location: Delhi, India
- Coordinates: 28°43′23″N 77°11′49″E
- Area: 52 acres (21 ha; 0.21 km^{2})
- Opened: 1911
- Operator: Delhi Development Authority

Coronation Park is a park located at Burari Road near Nirankari Sarovar (Formless Lake) in Delhi, India. It was the venue of the Delhi Durbar of 1877 when Queen Victoria was proclaimed the Empress of India. Later it was used to celebrate the accession of King Edward VII in 1903, and, finally, it was here that the Durbar commemorating the coronation of King George V as Emperor of India took place on 12 December 1911, subsequent to his coronation at Westminster Abbey in June 1911. This last celebration had all the princely states in attendance. The decision to hold the Coronation Durbars in Delhi at the vast open ground at Coronation Park was a move to emphasise the historical significance of Delhi as the former capital of the Mughal Empire.

Coronation Park has the largest and tallest statue of King George V. The statue was moved here in the mid-1960s from a site opposite India Gate in the centre of New Delhi. It is opposite an obelisk called the Coronation Memorial, which commemorates the 1911 Durbar, when George V laid the foundation stone for the new capital city of New Delhi.

== History ==
Delhi was chosen as the site of the park because the city boasted a great historical legacy for such royal activities. The site was developed as a park and venue to hold the first Durbar, or imperial pageant, in Delhi under the supervision of the British Raj. Durbars were an "invented tradition" to showcase the prowess of the British by perpetuating a tradition of previous Hindu, Muslim and Mughal rulers. Three Durbars were held by the British monarchy during a period of forty years in the park, which was located near the soon to be created New Delhi, just south of Shahjahanbad. The three Durbars were held near a ridge where the British won a great victory during the Indian rebellion of 1857. In addition, the location helped emphasise the grandeur of the British monarchy to the native rulers and the people who attended the Durbars.

=== The first Durbar ===
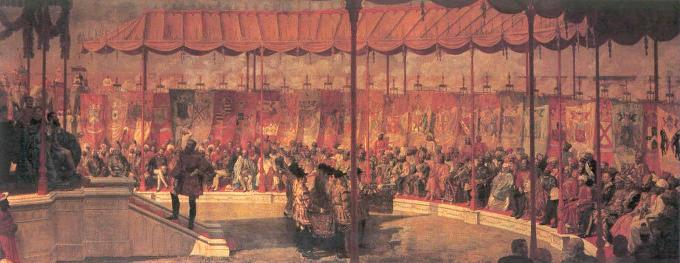
The Delhi Durbar of 1877. Lord Lytton, the Viceroy of India, is seated on the dais to the left.

The first Durbar, initiated by Lord Lytton, the then Viceroy of India, was held on 1 January 1877 at Coronation Park in Delhi to mark the proclamation of Queen Victoria as Empress of India. Lord Lytton conceived the procession in order to represent the British Raj as bringing "order and discipline, which was in (his) ideology part of the whole system of colonial control". The Durbar was an extravaganza of pomp and ceremony including a parade on a decorated elephant by Lord and Lady Lytton in the presence of nearly 70,000 people. The imperial gathering consisted of royalty from all the provinces of India and the most senior British dignitaries.

=== The second Durbar ===
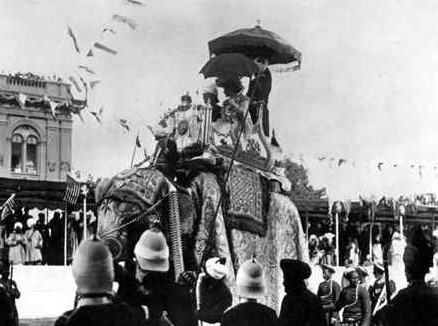
Lord Curzon and Lady Curzon arriving at the Delhi Durbar, 1903.

The second Durbar was organised for 1 January 1903 to celebrate the Coronation of King Edward VII. Lord Curzon, the Viceroy and the event's chief architect, planned meticulously what was considered an extravagant display of pomp and splendour.

Curzon converted the drab and dry land of the park into a virtual tented city by establishing huge encampments with colourful tents. In this city of tents there was a variety of infrastructure including water, drainage, sanitation, electricity and rail communications supplied to the venue from different locations in the nearby city. Firework displays, exhibitions and glamorous dances were organised. Special postage stamps were issued on the occasion. Post offices, telegraph and telephone communications were provided. Field Marshal Lord Kitchener, Commander-in-Chief, India, organised daily parades, band practice and polo matches. The elite of the world media were present, but the intended chief guest, the King-Emperor himself, did not attend the celebrations held in his honour. Instead, he was represented by his brother, Prince Arthur, Duke of Connaught and Strathearn.

The Duke arrived from Bombay with a large contingent of dignitaries. The festivities lasted for a fortnight and the Delhi Durbar parade became a standard feature of early 20th century spectacle in India. The Viceroy and Governors of the various provinces and the Maharajas of princely states were present, bringing their large colourful entourages. The event was presided over by the Duke and by Lord and Lady Curzon. It is also said that more than 100,000 people attended the Durbar at Coronation Park. But this extravagant spectacle was dubbed as the 'Curzonization Durbar' as people suspected he regarded the occasion more as a celebration Curzon's own viceregality than of the ascension of a new king.'

=== The third Durbar ===
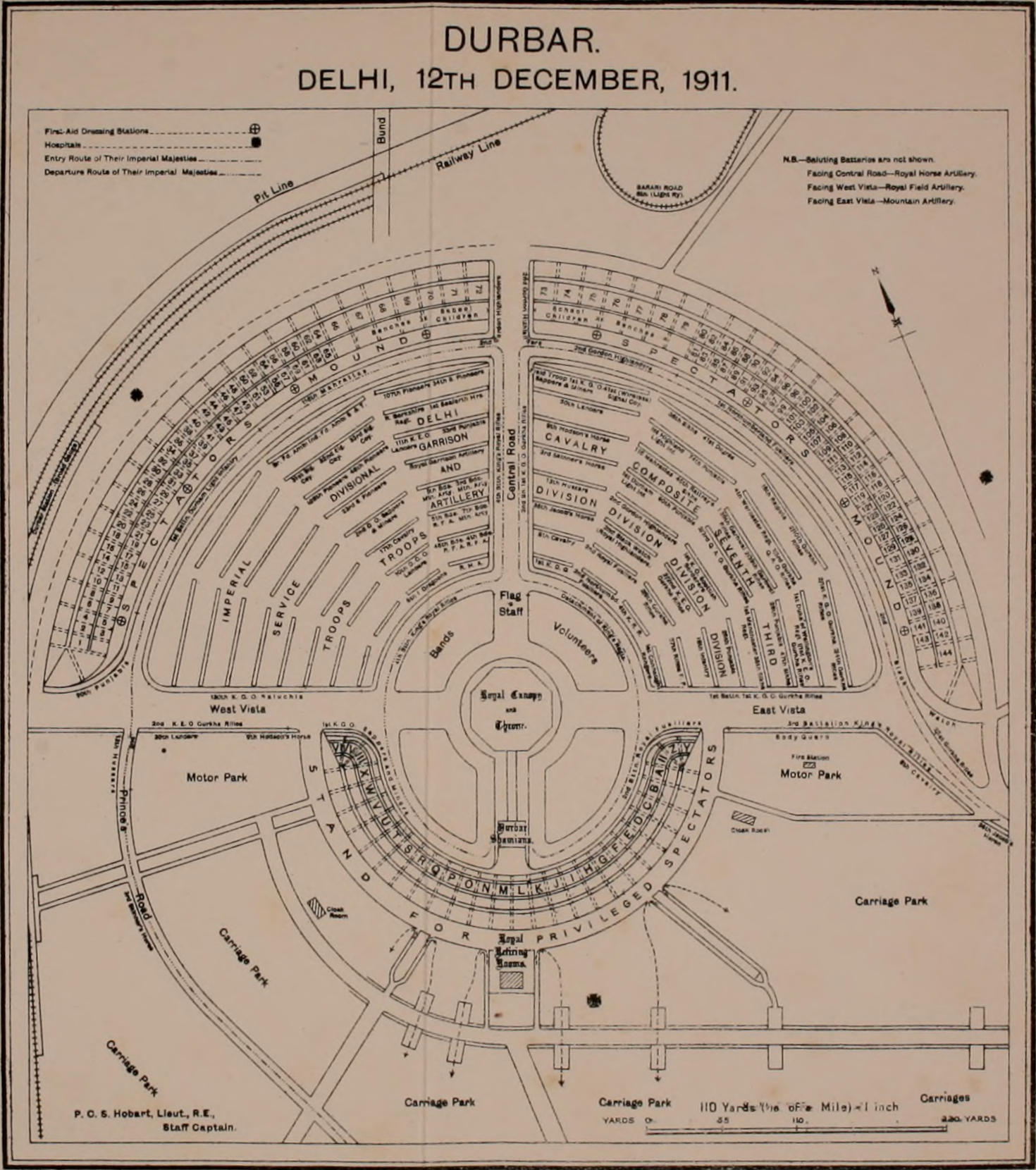
Plan of the site for the 1911 Durbar

The final Durbar was organised in 1911 at the same venue as the two previous ones. There was no disappointment for Viceroy Lord Hardinge when he was authorised to plan the event by a British government communication which stated:

Royal intention to hold at Delhi on the twelfth day of December one thousand nine hundred and eleven an Imperial Durbar for the purpose of making known the said solemnity of Our Coronation and We do hereby charge and command Our right trusted and well beloved counsellor Charles Baron Hardinge of Penshurst, Our Viceroy and Governor General of India, to take all necessary measures in that behalf.

Lord Hardinge organised the Durbar with great care and effort ensuring that everything was done with the utmost glitter and pomp since the King-Emperor, George V, was to attend. King George V was the first reigning Monarch of the United Kingdom to attend a Durbar. He was accompanied by Queen Mary, his Queen Consort. The King-Emperor made many historical proclamations which paved the way for the present Edwin Lutyens-designed New Delhi to be built to the south west of Shahjahanabad, the last Mughal city of Delhi. King George V and his Queen sat on golden thrones under a golden umbrella on 11 December 1911 when they proclaimed that the capital of British India would be shifted from Calcutta to Delhi.

In 1911, an immense sum of £600,000 stg. was approved for the Durbar and maintenance of the visiting local rulers. An additional £300,000 were supplied by the Government of India to pay for eighty thousand Army troops in the parades and security for the event. The Imperial Hotel in New Delhi, considered a legacy of the colonial times, continues to display pictures of the Durbar in a Coffee Shop named "1911".

After the Coronation Durbar, Edwin Lutyens (Sir Edwin from 1918) was authorised by Lord Hardinge to proceed with preparing plans for building New Delhi. By shifting the capital to Delhi in 1912, as announced by the King in 1911, the British attempted to erase the memory of Mughal rule. Also, this return to Delhi emulated the practice followed by earlier pre-Islamic and the Mughal rulers who had established their own cities in Delhi, a move meant to increase the British Imperial image.

=== Other uses ===
The Queen-Empress, Mary of Teck, bestowed the Kaisar-i-Hind Medal upon all the governors of the provinces during the 1911 Durbar at Coronation Park. Following the announcements, the Queen laid the foundation stone for the Viceroy's residence. However, the location was later not found suitable for building the Residency for the Viceroy since the area was in the flood prone zone of the Yamuna River. The stone was later shifted to Raisina Hill. The construction of Viceroy's House (as it was officially called), the present Rashtrapati Bhavan, was started after World War I and completed in 1931, when the City of New Delhi was inaugurated.

== Coronation memorial ==
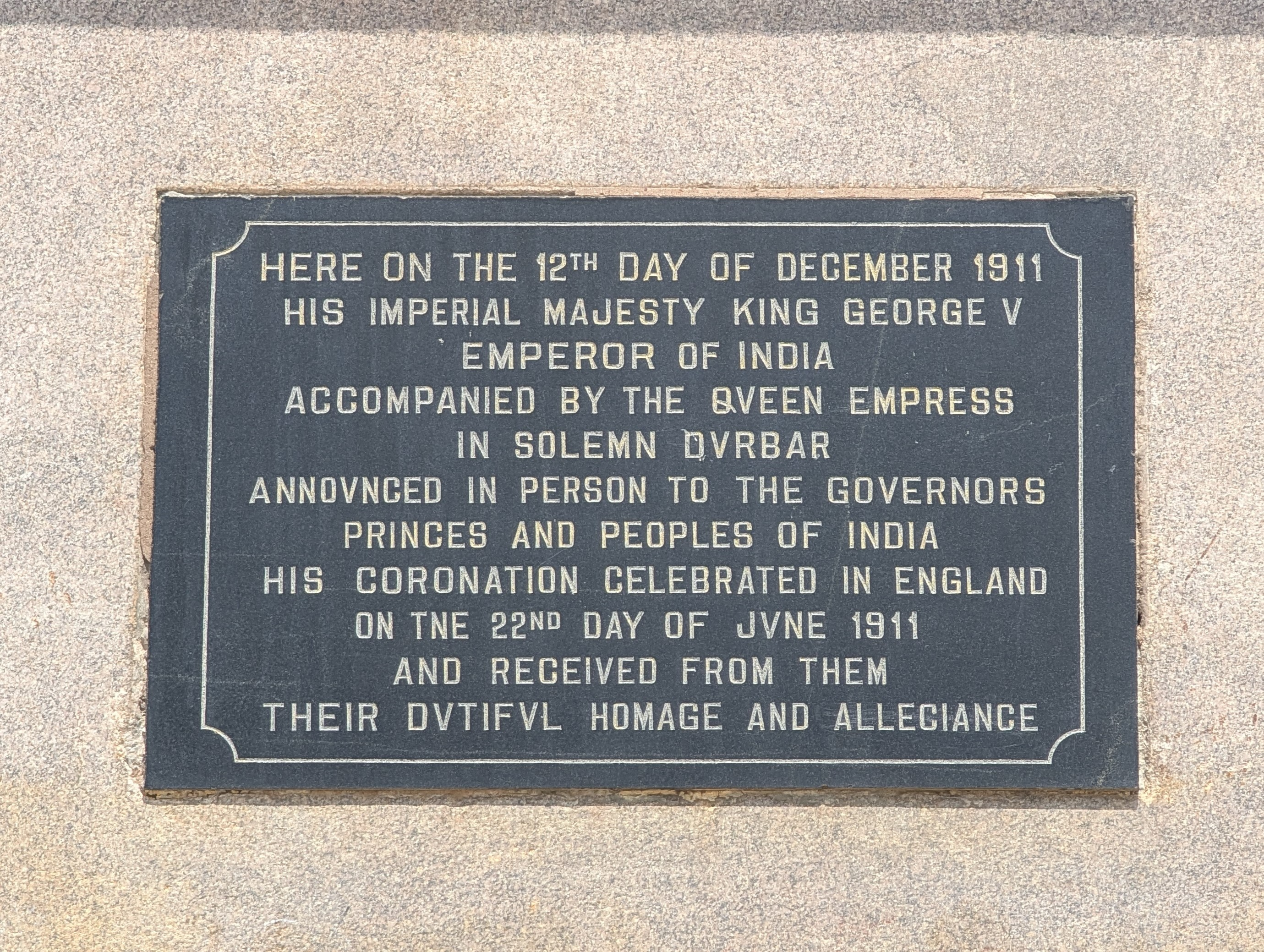
The plaque on the Coronation Memorial obelisk erected where King George V and Queen Mary sat in the Durbar of 1911

The Coronation Memorial erected as an obelisk in the sprawling Coronation Park is made of sandstone. It is erected over a high raise square plinth with steps on all four sides. The memorial has been erected at exactly the same location where all the three British Durbars were held in the past. The inscription on the Memorial testifies the final Durbar event and states:

Here on the 12th Day of December 1911, His Imperial Majesty King George V, Emperor of India accompanied by the Queen Empress in solemn Durbar announced in person to the Governors, Princes and Peoples of India his Coronation celebrated in England on the 22nd day of June 1911 and received from them their dutiful homage and allegiance.

Today, the park is a well-guarded open space whose desolateness stands in stark contrast with the heavy traffic of northern Delhi's urban sprawl. The park is occasionally used for major religious festivals and municipal conventions.

== Post-independence ==
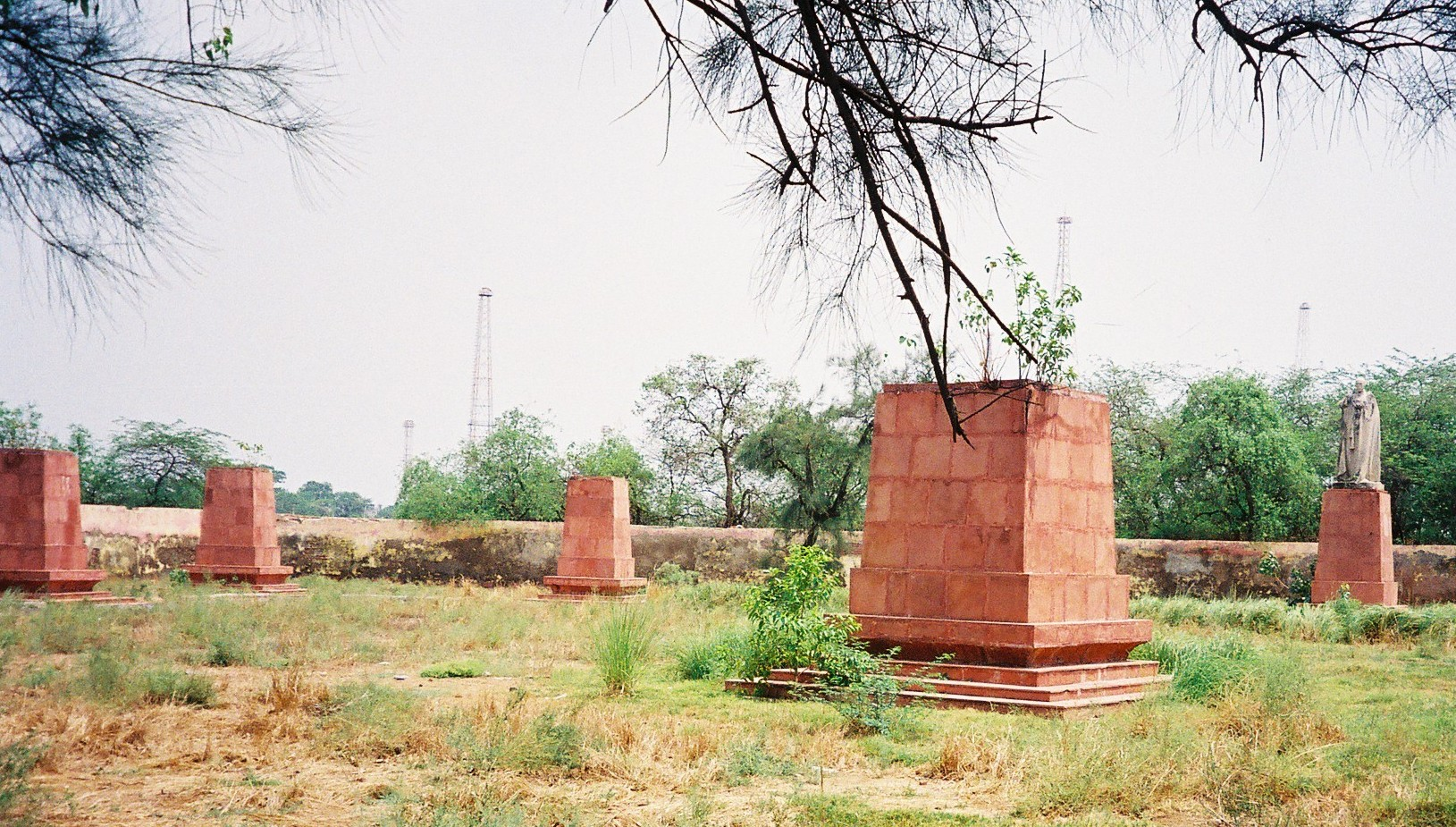
Vacant plinths in 2009

Following the independence of India on 15 August 1947, the park has become the final resting place for some of the statues of former British kings, governors and officials of the British Raj. The statues were moved from various locations (including Rajpath) to the red stone plinths built in the park's specially designed enclosures, just opposite the Obelisk. The largest and tallest statue, a 15 m (49 ft) high marble statue designed by Sir Edwin Lutyens, is opposite to the Obelisk commemorating the Durbar and is the tallest statue of King George V. His statue had earlier stood atop a canopy in front of the India Gate, which now holds a statue of Netaji Subhas Chandra Bose ever since 8 September 2022.

Nineteen pedestals were built to install the displaced statues but only five are fixed, while the remaining plinths are vacant. Some of the statues were stolen or damaged, whilst several of the statues expected to populate the plinths were retained by the communities in which they were first installed. King George's statue, though it appears forlorn in the sparse field, is well maintained. The other statues, which all originated in Delhi, stand arranged in a semicircle around the King's statue. They are those of Sir Guy Fleetwood Wilson and Viceroys Lord Willingdon, Lord Irwin and Lord Hardinge. However, there are no inscriptions indicating the names of the other individuals depicted here.

The park is enclosed by high steel fencing, whose well guarded entrance gate has a plaque which proclaims:

This memorial was erected to commemorate the Coronation Durbar of King George V and Queen Mary held in December 1911. On this occasion the King announced the transfer of the capital of British India from Calcutta to Delhi.

== Conservation measures ==
Entrance to the Coronation Park

In 2005, the Indian National Trust for Art and Cultural Heritage (INTACH) and Government of Delhi resolved to restore Coronation Park, which was in a state of neglect.

INTACH has also decided to complete the heritage corridor along with also improving and standardising the signs on Delhi's roads from Coronation Park in the north to Qutab Minar in south as part of the beautification of Delhi before the 2010 Commonwealth Games.

Delhi Development Authority (DDA) has prepared a Draft Zonal Development Plan for Zone – "C" (Civil Lines Zone) which includes the Conservation & Heritage of the precincts of the Coronation Pillar. DDA expects to develop it as a tourist spot since it is very close to the National Highway 1 (NH 1) bypass. It is also intended to develop the area around the Nirankari Sarovar, which has been earmarked for green/water body with sports facilities. In 2017, however, after missing several project deadlines, the park largely remained in a state of neglect.

== Access ==
During the Durbar in 1911, and also the previous ones held at the same open ground to the north of the cantonment, light railway lines were laid connecting the Civil Lines on one side where the Viceroy and governors had camped and another line leading to the parade ground and the proclamation podium.

The park is located on the Bhai Parmanand Marg (Road), also called Burari Road, in the crowded urban sprawls of North Delhi, 2 km (1.2 mi) north of Kingsway Camp, 17 km (11 mi) from Delhi. Bhai Paramanand Road branches from the Mall Road or the Karnal Road in Civil Lines of Kingsway camp of Delhi.

== Gallery ==
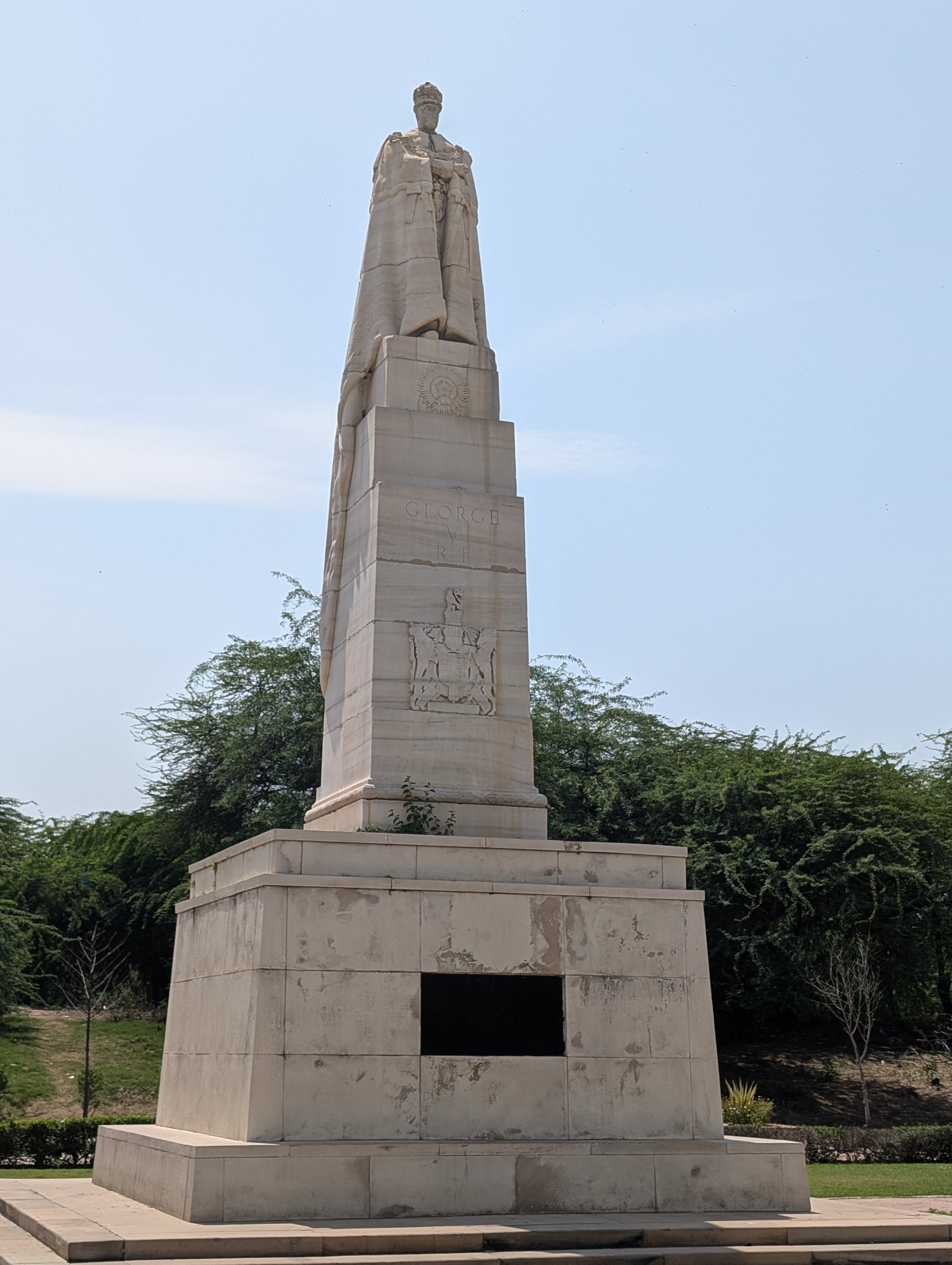
King George V's statue was removed from the canopy opposite India Gate in August 1968 and moved to Coronation Park.

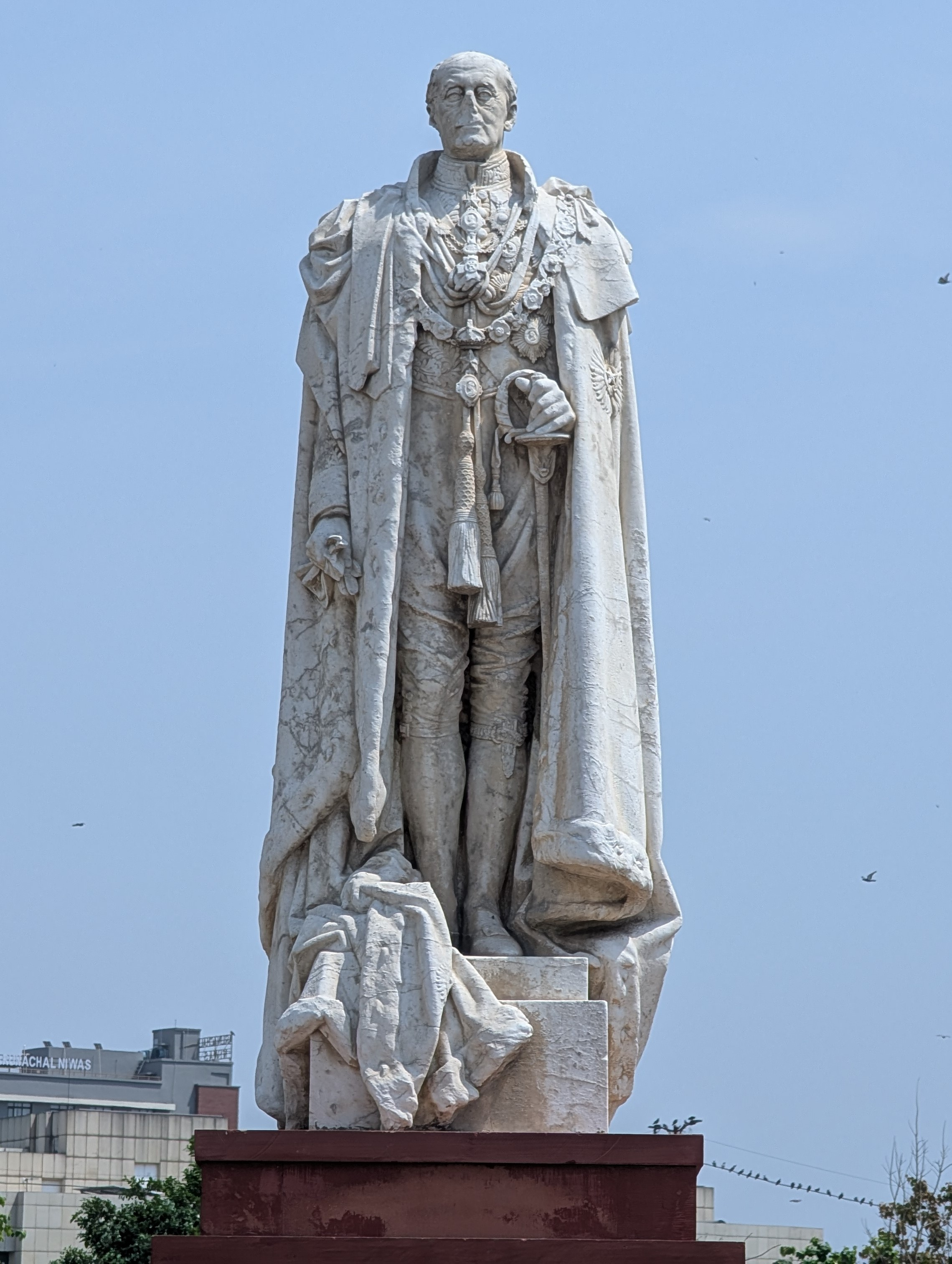
Statue of Lord Hardinge of Penshurst, Viceroy of India (1910–1916)

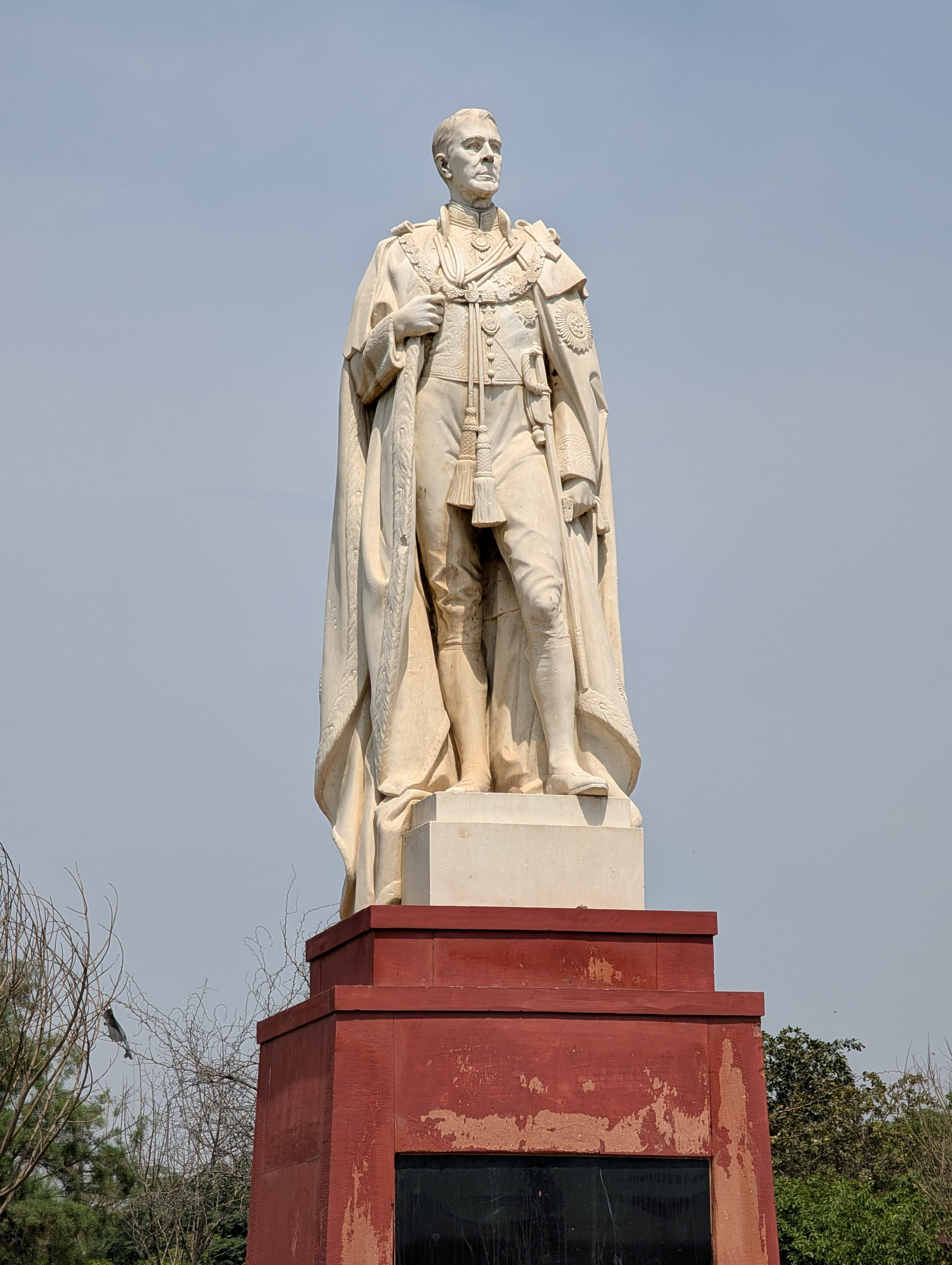
Statue of Lord Chelmsford, Viceroy of India (1916–1921)

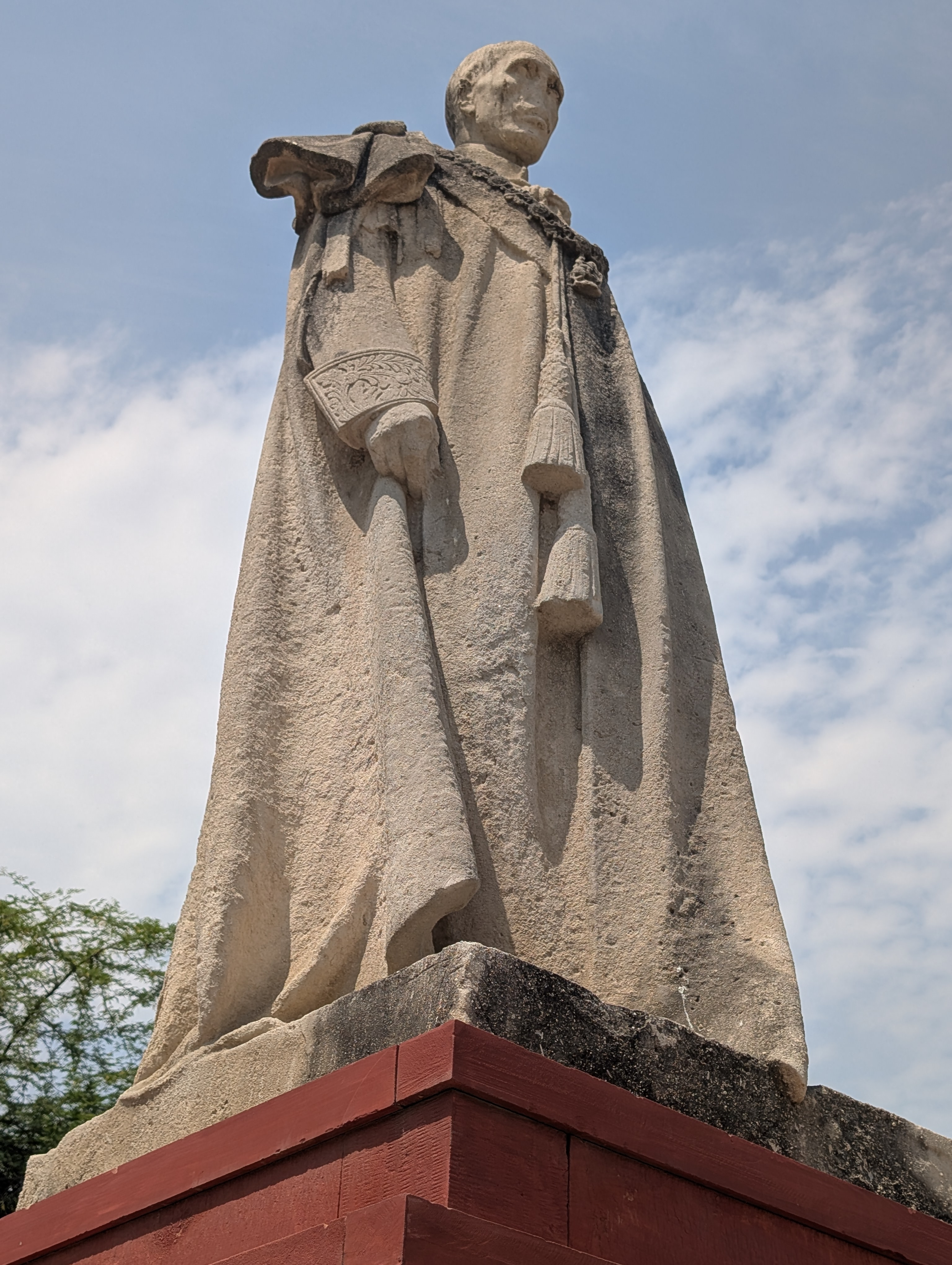
Statue of Lord Irwin, Viceroy of India (1926–1931)

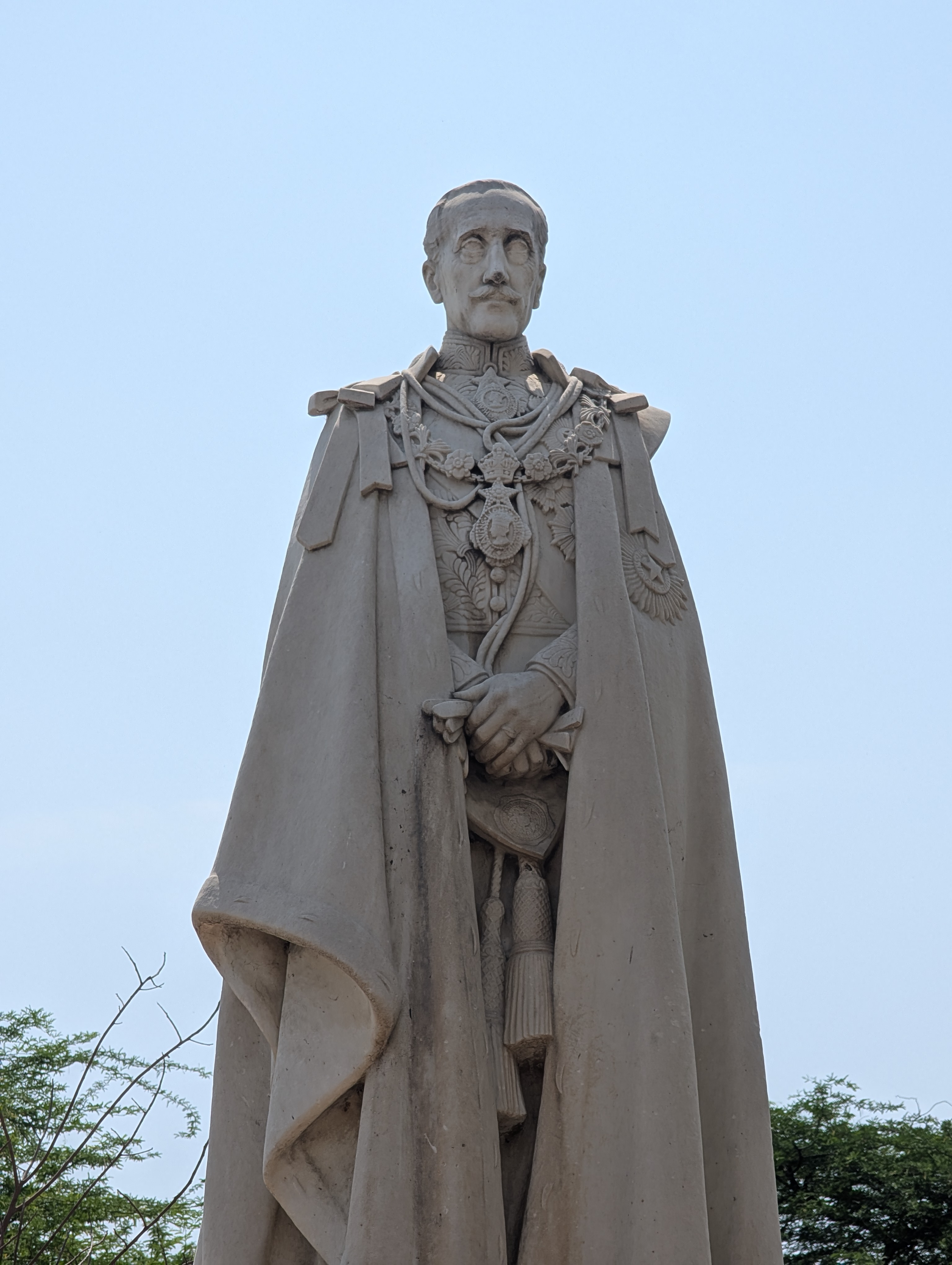
Statue of Lord Willingdon, Viceroy of India (1931–1936)

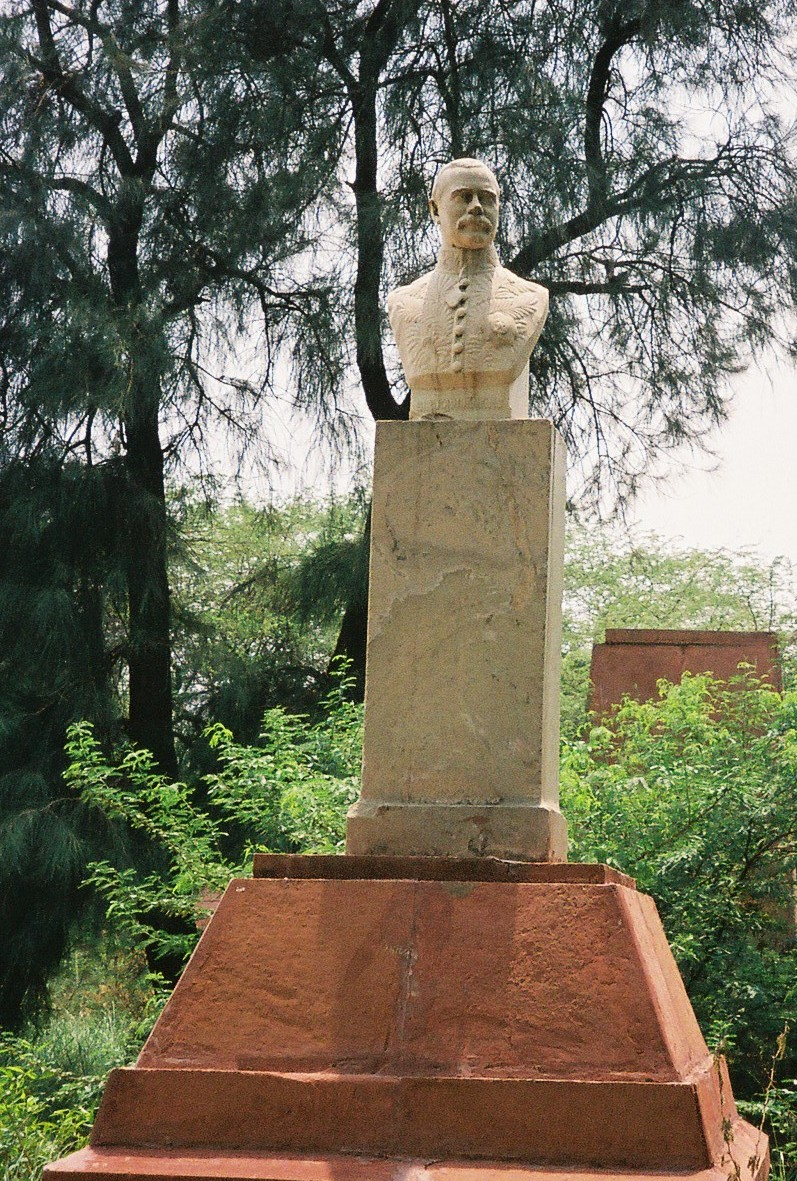
Bust of Sir John Lewis Jenkins
