= Guru Tegh Bahadur Nagar, Delhi =

Guru Tegh Bahadur Nagar
- Neighborhood of Delhi
- Location in Delhi, India
- Coordinates: 28.6984°N 77.1198°E
- Country: India
- State: Delhi
- District: North West Delhi
- Time zone: UTC+5:30 (IST)
- PIN: 110009
- Civic agency: Municipal Corporation of Delhi

Guru Tegh Bahadur Nagar, formerly known as Kingsway Camp (its official name until 1970) is a neighbourhood situated in North West part of Delhi. It is a historic locality, situated in the vicinity of Civil Lines and University of Delhi and encompasses residential areas like Hudson Lines, Outram Lines, and Haqiqat Nagar. Neighbouring localities include Mukherjee Nagar and Model Town. The foundation of the new capital of British India, New Delhi, was laid at the Coronation Park by King George V in December, 1911, rendering this area historically significant.

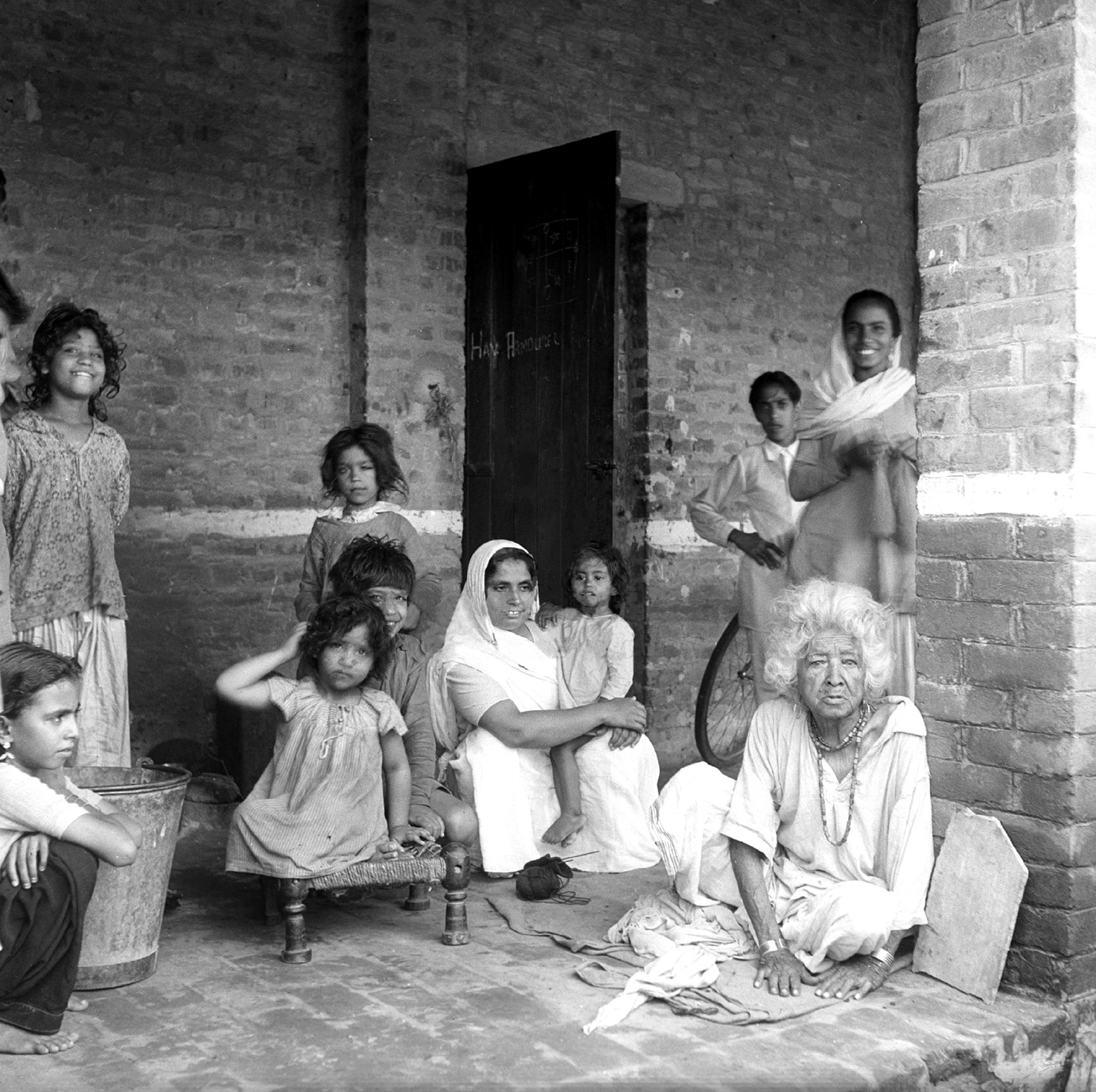
Refugees from West Punjab and Dera Ismail Khan at Kingsway Camp in 1947

Originally named after the Kingsway, an avenue built as a precursor to the residence of the Viceroy of India following the Delhi Durbar of 1911, the location was ultimately shifted to Raisina Hill, its current site. The road formerly known as the Kingsway was rechristened to Rajpath after the British withdrawal from India. The area stretched over twenty-five square miles from the banks of Yamuna River in the east to Shalimar Bagh in the west. After India's independence, it became the site of Delhi's largest refugee camp, accommodating 300,000 refugees. Today, it is a bustling residential area, home to a significant student population due to its close proximity to Delhi University. The locality is served by the Guru Tegh Bahadur Nagar station on the Yellow Line of the Delhi Metro.

== History ==
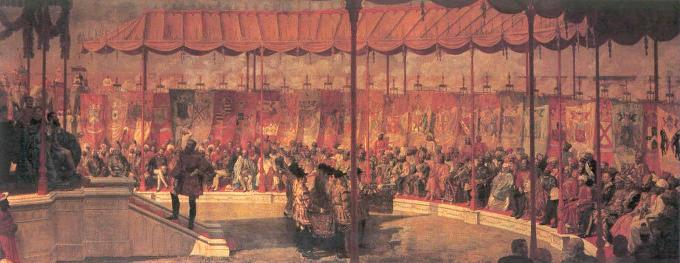
The Delhi Durbar of 1877 at Coronation Park; the Viceroy of India, Lord Edward Lytton, is seated on the dais to the left

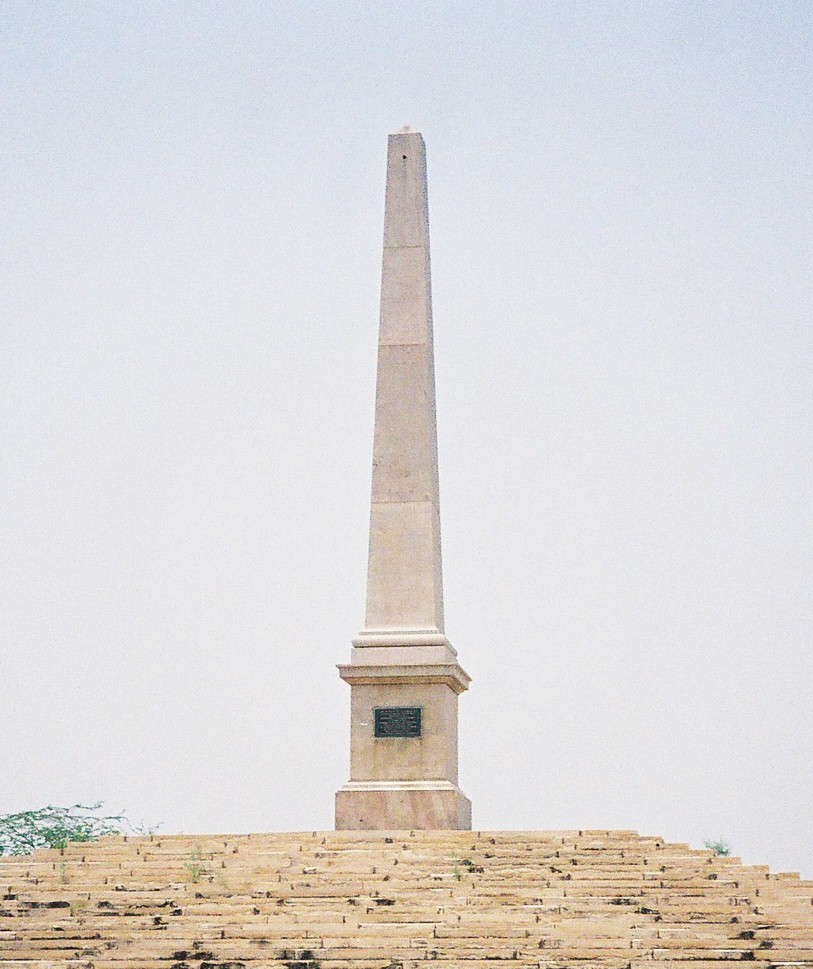
Coronation Memorial at Coronation Park: a commemorative obelisk erected at the exact spot where King George V and Queen Mary sat for the 1911 Durbar, and declared the transfer of capital of the British Raj from Calcutta to Delhi.

During the British Raj, the area acquired importance owing to its proximity to the Coronation Park where all three Delhi Durbars or ceremonies for imperial coronations took place in 1877, 1903, and 1911. Coronation Memorial comprises vast swathes of land with an obelisk erected at the very spot where the three successive grand Durbars unfolded. The most seminal event took place on 12 December 1911, when George V, the then Emperor of India along with Queen Mary, at the sidelines of the Delhi Durbar, proclaimed that the capital of the Raj was to be shifted from Calcutta to Delhi. Thereafter, on 15 December 1911, they laid the foundation stone for the Viceroy's residence (which was designated the official residence of the President of India after India became independent) and New Delhi at this site, which was eventually shifted to its present location on Raisina Hill, further down south. The newly-appointed emperors of the British Raj were stationed at Kingsway Camp during the Durbars. Since the emperors/empresses had to pass through this route, it was named Kingsway Camp.

In the 1910s, the government established a steam-generation power plant here, known as the Central Power House. Around 1931, when the capital of India shifted to New Delhi, the plant was relocated to Raj Ghat.

The Harijan Sevak Sangh for Dalits was founded here by Mahatma Gandhi on September 24, 1932. Later, the Valmiki Bhawan within the campus served as Gandhi’s one-room ashram. Today, the 20-acre (81,000 m²) campus houses the Gandhi Ashram, Harijan Basti, Lala Hans Raj Gupta Industrial Training Institute, and a residential school for boys and girls.

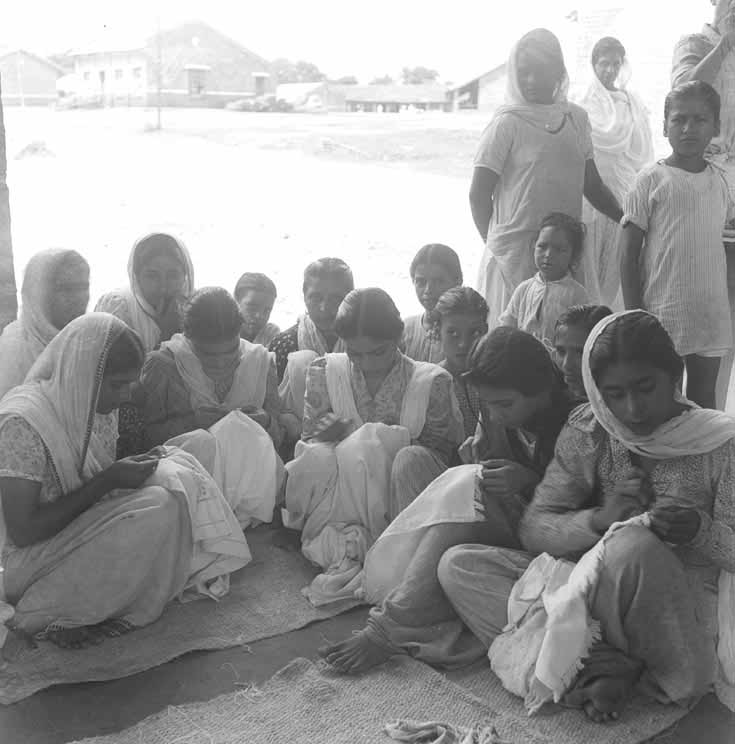
Women refugees at Kingsway Camp busy in sewing and knitting, September 1947

However, until India gained independence, much of the area remained covered with fruit gardens or was left as wilderness and swamps, owing to its low-lying location that often flooded during the rainy season. With India's independence in 1947, Kingsway Camp became one of the many refugee camps established in Delhi. It housed approximately 300,000 people displaced from the newly formed Pakistan during the partition of India, making it the largest such camp. The burgeoning tide of refugees pouring from Pakistan sought refuge in tents and temporary barracks over the course of time. In May 1949, over 42,000 refugees were still residing in the camp as the construction of rehabilitation colonies and houses in the area was underway. It was during this time that the camp's inhabitants launched a hunger strike. Gandhian Lakshmi Chand Jain was in charge of the camp's operations, which was located near the Gandhi Ashram where Gandhi held his prayer meetings. Kamaladevi Chattopadhyay also played a vital role, working extensively with women's groups and promoting the formation of cooperatives. Over the next few years, many refugees settled in the nearby area, with some moving to West Delhi residential neighborhoods and newly built refugee townships. Unlike other refugee townships like Nilokheri, Faridabad, and Rajpura, there was no concerted effort to integrate residential and economic activities. However, due to its proximity to Delhi University, the area thrived in the years that followed..

The Oznam Home, a noted old-age home, was established here by St. Vincent de Paul Society in 1958. The Home was administered by an Austrian nun, Sister Edith, who stayed for the next 30 years. Kingsway Camp was officially renamed Guru Teg Bahadur Nagar, after Guru Tegh Bahadur, the ninth revered Guru in Sikhism, on December 12, 1970, by the Municipal Corporation of Delhi. All India Radio's first external service shortwave facility was also established here.

== Literature ==
- Vijendra Kasturi Ranga Varadaraja Rao, Vijendra (1955). An economic review of refugee rehabilitation in India: a study of the Kingsway camp. Delhi School of Economics.
- Singh, Khushwant (1990). Delhi. Penguin Books. ISBN 978-0-14-012619-8. "kingsway camp."
- Pandey, Gyanendra (2001). Remembering partition: violence, nationalism, and history in India. Cambridge University Press. ISBN 0-521-00250-8.
- Sinha, P.C. (2005). Encyclopaedia of Travel, Tourism and Ecotourism, Volume 1. Anmol Publications. ISBN 81-261-2398-2.
