= Haqiqat Nagar =

Coordinates: 28.700°N 77.206°E

- Neighborhood of Delhi
- Location in Delhi, India
- Country: India
- State: Delhi
- District: North West

Languages
  - Official: Hindi
- Time zone: UTC+5:30 (IST)

Haqiqat Nagar (Hindi: हक़ीक़त नगर, Urdu: حقیقت نگار, Punjabi: ਹਾਕ਼ੀਕ਼ਾਤ ਨਗਰ), also spelled as Hakikat Nagar, is a residential colony in Delhi located near Kingsway Camp in the North West district. The colony was named famous Hindu leader who attained veergati (वीरगति, i.e. martyrdom) in Lahore, Haqiqat Rai, and is one of the sites where refugees from the Sind and Punjab provinces settled. This colony is part of the Model Town tehsil. The colony is at the crossroads of Mall Road and Banda Bahadur. The GTB Nagar metro station of Delhi Metro provides convenient transportation to other parts of Delhi.

The colony has around 384 houses, two temples, one gurudwara (Sikh temple), one community center and one co-ed primary school. Haqiqat Nagar is very close to the University of Delhi North Campus, and the commercial education centers like Mukherjee Nagar. This area has a popular market known as Camp Market. Local medical facilities include the Sehgal Eye Hospital and Maternity Center.
