= Haqiqat Rai =

Religious martyr

Veer Haqiqat Rai
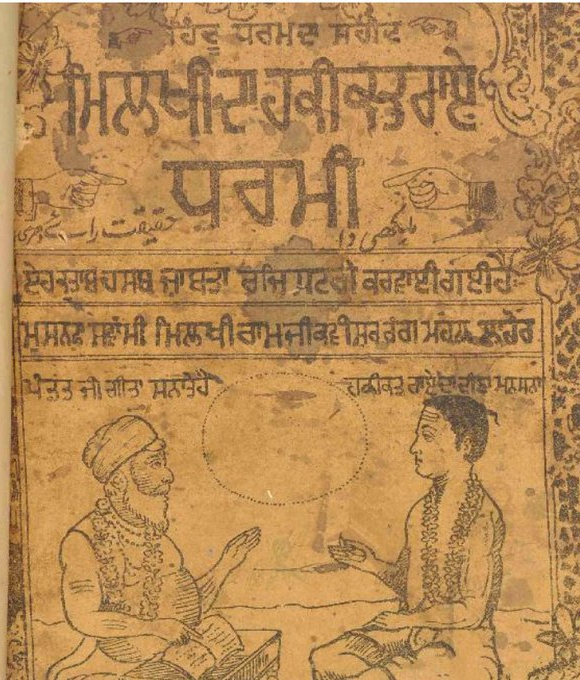
- Depiction of Veer Haqiqat Rai (Right), ca. early 20th century

Personal life
- Born: 1720 Sialkot, Lahore Subah, Mughal Empire (present-day Sialkot, Punjab, Pakistan)
- Died: 1734 (aged 13–14) Lahore, Lahore Subah, Punjab, Mughal Empire (present-day Punjab, Pakistan)
- Cause of death: Execution by Immurement with Stoning & Beheading
- Spouse: Lakshmi Devi
- Parent: Bhai Baghmal (father)

Haqiqat Rai (1720–1734) was an 18th-century boy from Sialkot, who was executed in Lahore during the time of Zakariya Khan. An account of his martyrdom was recorded by Agra Sethi in 1719.

== Accounts ==
=== Haqiqat Rai di Var ===
According to Akkra's ballad, Haqiqat Rai was born into a Hindu Khatri family of Sialkot; his father was Baghmal. Some of his Muslim classmates had ridiculed Hindu deities to which a fifteen-year old Haqiqat retorted by insulting Islam — this was reported to the Maulvi.

A case was accordingly filed before the qazi, who asked him to choose between converting to Islam or being put to death. Despite persuasions, Haqiqat refused and was beheaded in Lahore during Zakariya Khan's governorship.

=== Char Bagh-i Punjab ===
Ganesh Das (in Char Bagh-i Punjab) agrees with Akkra about Haqiqat's antecedents. But specifics concerning the rest of narrative vary.

He accuses a mullah of having cried wolf about blasphemy, after his son was defeated by an intellectually superior Haqiqat on a religion-themed discussion. Irate Muslim inhabitants of the city refused to accept apology of their Hindu brethren (including Haqiqat's parents) in the town and insisted that he either convert or be put to death. On no easy resolution, the mullah bribed city officials and approached the office of Governor Zakariya Khan at Lahore.

Portrayed as a man of liberal demeanor, Khan had outright rejected the charges as fabricated upon cross-examination of witnesses despite the mullah bringing a large crowd of supporters, in anticipation. However, he was held to ransom by the conservatives — ulema, qazi, and Mufti — who supported the mullah and opposed the interference of an administrative official in religious matters. Khan conceded to their demands and suggested that Haqiqat convert to Islam in lieu of mansabdaari status and other privileges.

On Haqiqat's prompt rejection of this offer, the Mufti pronounced a verdict of death-sentence but it was stalled for a day upon his father's wish to convince him about accepting Khan's suggestion. Despite, Haqiqat remained steadfast and waxed long about the virtues of Hinduism and vices of Islam; the following day, Khan had him handed to the clerics in the open court. He was immobilized in waist-deep soil and stoned, until a soldier beheaded him of piety; the severed head continued to chant Ram Nam. Haqiqat was cremated — pursuant to Hindu rites — in the garden of one Diwan Kirpa Ram Chopra and a samadhi was installed, which became a spot of veneration for local Hindus.

=== Prachin Panth Prakash ===
Ratan Singh Bhangu held that Haqiqat Rai was mistakenly held to be a Sikh by Zakariya Khan — during a tenure marked with extreme animosity against Khalsa — and consequently murdered in 1734 C.E.

== Legacy ==
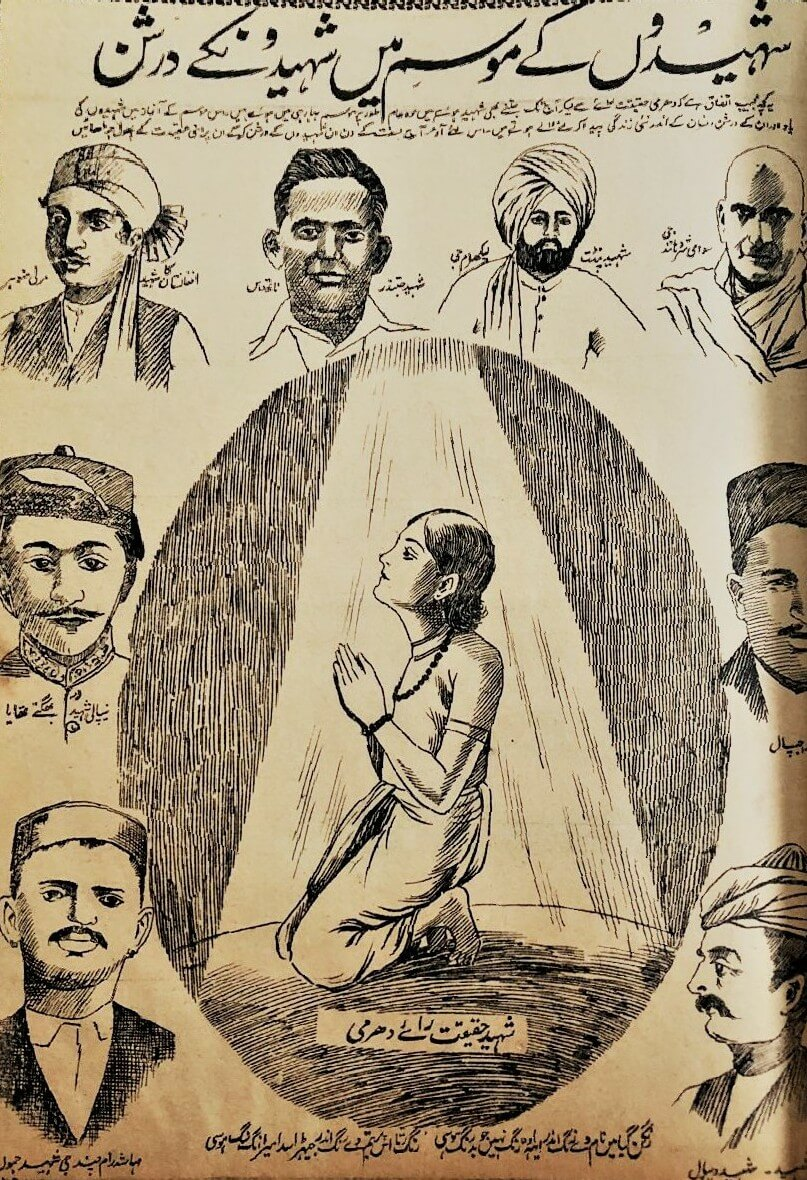
A full page feature depicting Hindus who had been victims of "Muslim violence", with Haqiqat Rai at-centre, published in the Daily Milap (3 February 1930)

Haqiqat's legacy has been claimed by Hindus as well as Sikhs. In 1782/84, a Sikh poet named Aggra (aka Agra or Aggar Singh) wrote a Punjabi vaar (ballad) titled Haqiqat Rai di Var espousing him as a Hindu martyr. Maharaja Ranjit Singh particularly revered Haqiqat Rai as a Sikh martyr.

In the first decade of the twentieth century (1905–10), three Bengali writers popularized the legend of Haqiqat Rai's martyrdom through their essays. The three accounts differ greatly. The Arya Samaj organized a play Dharmaveer Haqiqat Rai, advocating deep loyalty to Hinduism. It also printed copies of the legend, and distributed them free of cost or at a nominal price of 2 paisa.

Before the partition of India in 1947, Hindus and Sikhs used to gather at his samadhi in Lahore, during the Basant Panchami Festival. His samadhi in Sialkot was also a place of worship. In 2004, Nawa-i-Waqt, a Pakistani daily opposed Basant Panchami celebrations in Pakistan, arguing that the festival celebrated Haqiqat Rai's insult of Muhammad.

Another samadhi dedicated to Haqiqat Rai is located in Boeli of Baba Bhandari (Hoshiarpur district), where people gather and pay obeisance to Haqiqat Rai during Basant Panchami. In Gurdaspur district, a shrine dedicated to him is located at Batala. The town also has a samadhi dedicated to Sati Lakshmi Devi, said to be the wife of Haqiqat Rai.

Many cities in India have localities named after Haqiqat Rai, mostly the ones where the partition refugees settled; for example, Haqiqat Nagar in Delhi. An ISBT located in Sarai Kale Khan in Delhi, India is also named after him.

Sikhs today still view him as a Sikh martyr and his story is told while casting him as a Sikh in their tellings of it.
