= Haqeeqat (book) =

Hindi translation of a controversial book by M.G. Mathew

Haqeeqat (हक़ीक़त, meaning "reality", from the Arabic word Haqq) is the Hindi translation of a controversial book by a Kerala, India-based Christian evangelist M.G. Mathew. It was translated by Daniel Nathaniel, associated with Emmanuel Mission International (EMI). The book was written as an answer to the book Bunch of Thoughts, authored by M. S. Golwalkar, the late leader of the Rashtriya Swayamsevak Sangh.The book is widely regarded as an anti-Hindu book.

The Government of Rajasthan received complaints that the book ridiculed Hindu and Jain deities and beliefs. After examining the contents of the book, the government decided to ban it, as it felt that the book could incite communal violence.

EMI's founder, M.A. Thomas, and his son, Samuel Thomas, went into hiding as the police searched for them. Joseph D'souza, president of All India Christian Council (AICC) has stated that "They Bharatiya Janata Party, the party ruling Rajasthan have declared that they would make tribal areas of Rajasthan Christian-free and are working hard on it."

Hopegivers International, one of the largest Christian ministries in India, has approached the US State Department, US senators, and Christian friends in Washington DC, after Samuel Thomas’s arrest on March 16.

Kanchan Gupta has condemned the book as an "anti-Hindu diatribe". He says:

The book, Haqeeqat, is authored by a Kerala-based evangelist, MG Matthew, and purports to be a rebuttal of MS Golwalkar's writings that have been published by the RSS as Bunch of Thoughts. In reality, it is unadulterated abuse of Hindu scriptures, faith, ritual and tradition. It denigrates every tenet of Hinduism and pours undiluted scorn on Hindu icons and gurus. It casts aspersions on the chastity of Hindu women and questions received wisdom.

== See also ==
- Anti-Hinduism
