= Chirag Delhi metro station =

Metro station in Delhi, India

Chirag Delhi

General information
- Location: Lal Bahadur Shastri Marg, Chirag Delhi 110017
- Coordinates: 28°32′N 77°14′E
- System: Delhi Metro station
- Owner: Delhi Metro
- Operator: Delhi Metro Rail Corporation (DMRC)
- Line: Magenta Line Golden Line
- Platforms: Island platform Platform-1 → Botanical Garden; Platform-2 → Inderlok
- Tracks: 2

Construction
- Structure type: Underground, Double-track
- Platform levels: 2
- Accessible: Yes

Other information
- Status: Staffed, Operational
- Station code: CDLI

History
- Opened: 29 May 2018; 8 years ago
- Electrified: 25 kV 50 Hz AC through overhead catenary

Services
Preceding station	Delhi Metro	Following station
Panchsheel Park towards Inderlok	Magenta Line	Greater Kailash towards Botanical Garden
Future service
Greater Kailash-1 towards Lajpat Nagar	Golden Line	Pushpa Bhawan towards Kalindi Kunj via Saket G Block
Route map
Location

The Chirag Delhi metro station is located on the Magenta Line of the Delhi Metro. The station was opened for public on 29 May 2018.

The Chirag Delhi station is part of Phase III of Delhi Metro on the Magenta Line.

== The station ==
=== Station layout ===
G	Street Level	Exit/ Entrance
C	Concourse	Fare control, station agent, Ticket/token, shops
P	Platform 1 Eastbound	Towards → Botanical Garden; Next Station: Greater Kailash
P	Island platform | Doors will open on the right
P	Platform 2 Westbound	Towards ← Inderlok; Next Station: Panchsheel Park

== Entry/exit ==
Chirag Delhi metro station Entry/exits
Gate No-1	Gate No-2	Gate No-3	Gate No-4	Gate No-5
Chirag Delhi Village	Rockland Hotel	DDA Flats	Khanpur	Chirag Delhi Village
			Ambedkar Nagar	Jahapanah City Forest

== Connections ==
=== Bus ===
Delhi Transport Corporation bus routes number 448B, 540ACL, 540CL, 764, 764EXT, 764S, 774, AC-764, serves the station from nearby Chirag Delhi Naseer Marg bus stop.

== See also ==
- Delhi
- List of Delhi Metro stations
- Transport in Delhi
- Delhi Metro Rail Corporation
- Delhi Suburban Railway
- Delhi Monorail
- Delhi Transport Corporation
- South East Delhi
- Nehru Place
- National Capital Region (India)
- List of rapid transit systems
- List of metro systems
