= Vasant Vihar metro station =

Metro station in Delhi, India

Vasant Vihar

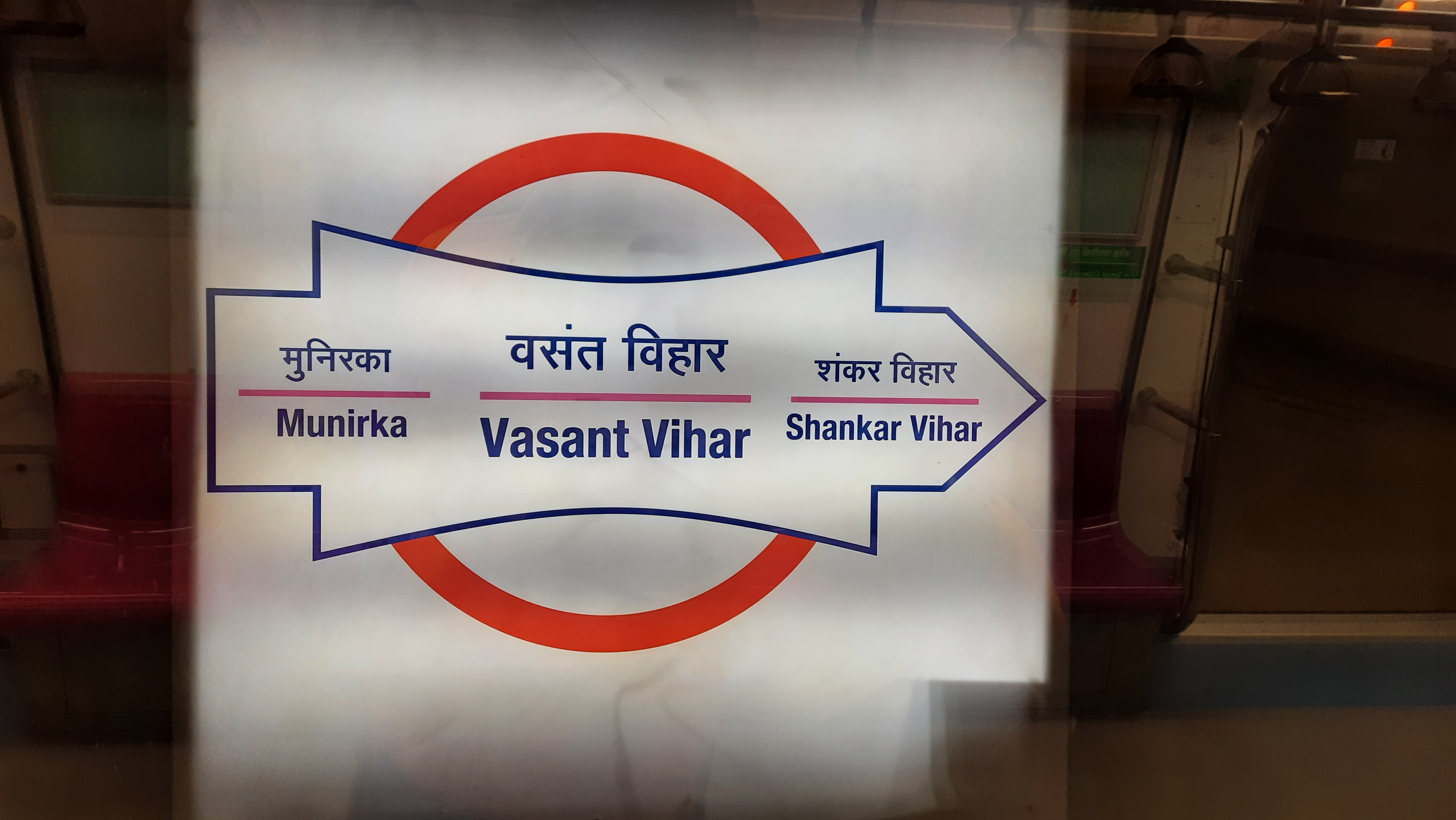

General information
- Location: CGHS Colony, Vasant Vihar, New Delhi, 110057
- Coordinates: 28°33′28″N 77°09′40″E
- System: Delhi Metro station
- Owner: Delhi Metro
- Operator: Delhi Metro Rail Corporation (DMRC)
- Line: Magenta Line
- Platforms: Island platform Platform-1 → Botanical Garden; Platform-2 → Inderlok
- Tracks: 2

Construction
- Structure type: Underground, Double-track
- Platform levels: 2
- Parking: Available
- Accessible: Yes

Other information
- Status: Staffed, Operational
- Station code: VTVR

History
- Opened: 29 May 2018; 8 years ago
- Electrified: 25 kV 50 Hz AC through overhead catenary

Services
Preceding station	Delhi Metro	Following station
Shankar Vihar towards Inderlok	Magenta Line	Munirka towards Botanical Garden
Route map
Location

The Vasant Vihar Metro Station is located on the Magenta Line of the Delhi Metro. It was opened to public on 29 May 2018.

== The station ==
=== Station layout ===
G	Street Level	Exit/ Entrance
C	Concourse	Fare control, station agent, Ticket/token, shops
P	Platform 1 Eastbound	Towards → Botanical Garden; Next Station: Munirka
P	Island platform | Doors will open on the right
P	Platform 2 Westbound	Towards ← Inderlok; Next Station: Shankar Vihar

== Entry/exit ==
Vasant Vihar metro station Entry/exits
Gate No-1	Gate No-2	Gate No-3	Gate No-4
Gurudwara	Munirka Marg	Embassy of Togo	Embassy El of Salvador
	Priya Park	CGHS Colony	Vasant Vihar F Block
	Vasant Lok Market		Jharkhand Bhavan
			Mizoram Bhavan
			Meghalaya House

== Connections ==
=== Bus ===
Delhi Transport Corporation bus routes number 623, 623A, AC-623, serves the station from nearby Vasant Vihar F Block bus stop.

== See also ==
- Delhi
- List of Delhi Metro stations
- Transport in Delhi
- Delhi Metro Rail Corporation
- Delhi Suburban Railway
- Delhi Monorail
- Delhi Transport Corporation
- South East Delhi
- Vasant Vihar, Delhi
- National Capital Region (India)
- List of rapid transit systems
- List of metro systems
