= Golf Course metro station =

Metro station in Delhi, India

Golf Course

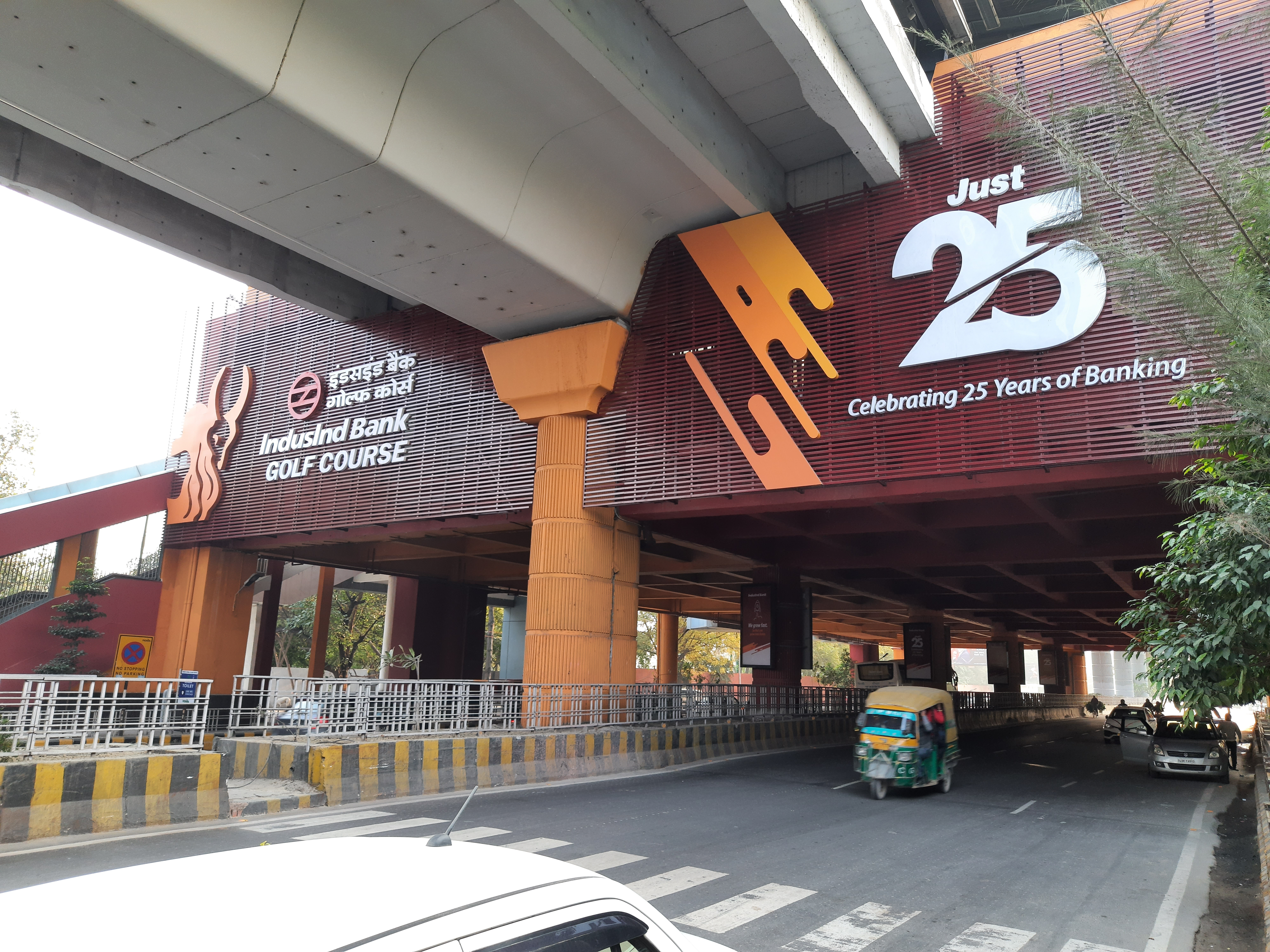

General information
- Location: Captain Shashi Kant Sharma Marg, Noida Golf Course, Noida, Uttar Pradesh 201303
- Coordinates: 28°34′02″N 77°20′46″E
- System: Delhi Metro station
- Owner: Delhi Metro Rail Corporation Ltd. (DMRC)
- Line: Blue Line
- Platforms: Side platform; Platform-1 → Noida Electronic City; Platform-2 → Dwarka Sector 21
- Tracks: 2

Construction
- Structure type: Elevated
- Platform levels: 2
- Accessible: Yes

Other information
- Station code: GEC

History
- Opened: 12 November 2009; 16 years ago
- Electrified: 25 kV 50 Hz AC through overhead catenary

Passengers
- 2015: Average 5,681 /day 176,101 (Month of Jan)

Services
Preceding station	Delhi Metro	Following station
Botanical Garden towards Dwarka Sector 21	Blue Line	Noida City Centre towards Noida Electronic City
Route map
Location

The Golf Course is a metro station on the Blue Line of the Delhi Metro.

== Station layout ==
L2	Side platform | Doors will open on the left
L2	Platform 1 South East bound	Towards → Noida Electronic City; Next Station: Noida City Centre
L2	Platform 2 Westbound	Towards ← Dwarka Sector 21; Next Station: Botanical Garden Change at the next station for Magenta Line
L2	Side platform | Doors will open on the left
L1	Concourse	Fare control, station agent, Metro Card vending machines, crossover
G	Street Level	Exit/Entrance

=== Facilities ===
List of available ATM at Golf Course metro station are Punjab National Bank.

== See also ==
- List of Delhi Metro stations
- Transport in Delhi
- Delhi Metro Rail Corporation
- Delhi Suburban Railway
- List of rapid transit systems in India
