= Panchsheel Park metro station =

Metro station in Delhi, India

Panchsheel Park

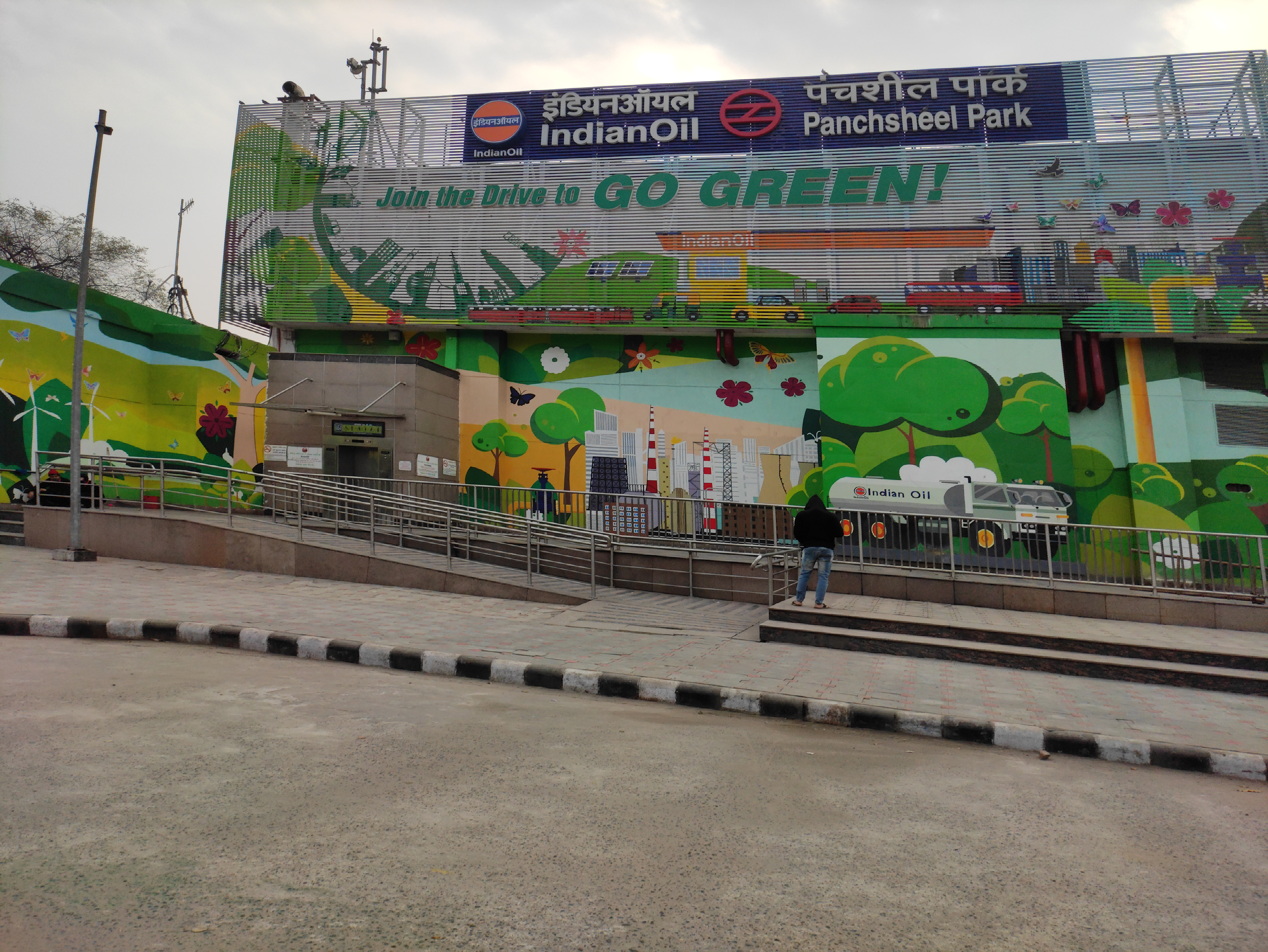

General information
- Location: Block B, near, Soami Nagar, Panchsheel Park, New Delhi, Delhi, 110017
- Coordinates: 28°32′32″N 77°13′14″E
- System: Delhi Metro station
- Owner: Delhi Metro
- Operator: Delhi Metro Rail Corporation (DMRC)
- Line: Magenta Line
- Platforms: Island platform Platform-1 → Botanical Garden; Platform-2 → Inderlok
- Tracks: 2

Construction
- Structure type: Underground, Double-track
- Platform levels: 2
- Accessible: Disabled access

Other information
- Status: Staffed, Operational
- Station code: PSPK

History
- Opened: 29 May 2018; 8 years ago
- Electrified: 25 kV 50 Hz AC through overhead catenary

Services
Preceding station	Delhi Metro	Following station
Hauz Khas towards Inderlok	Magenta Line	Chirag Delhi towards Botanical Garden
Route map
Location

The Panchsheel Park metro station is located on the Magenta Line of the Delhi Metro. It was opened to public on 29 May 2018.

== The station ==
=== Station layout ===
G	Street Level	Exit/ Entrance
C	Concourse	Fare control, station agent, Ticket/token, shops
P	Platform 1 Eastbound	Towards → Botanical Garden; Next Station: Chirag Delhi
P	Island platform | Doors will open on the right
P	Platform 2 Westbound	Towards ← Inderlok; Next Station: Hauz Khas Change at the next station for Yellow Line

== Entry/exit ==
Panchsheel Park metro station Entry/exits
Gate No-1	Gate No-2	Gate No-3
Savitri Nagar	Panchsheel Enclave	South Soami Nagar
Panchsheel Park S-Block	Max Hospital	

== Connections ==
=== Bus ===
Delhi Transport Corporation bus routes number 448B, 511, 511A, 540ACL, 540CL, 764, 764EXT, 764S, 774, AC-764, serves the station from nearby Panchsheel Park bus stop.

== See also ==
- Delhi
- List of Delhi Metro stations
- Transport in Delhi
- Delhi Metro Rail Corporation
- Delhi Suburban Railway
- Delhi Monorail
- Delhi Transport Corporation
- South East Delhi
- National Capital Region (India)
- List of rapid transit systems
- List of metro systems
