= R. K. Puram metro station =

Metro station in Delhi, India

R. K. Puram

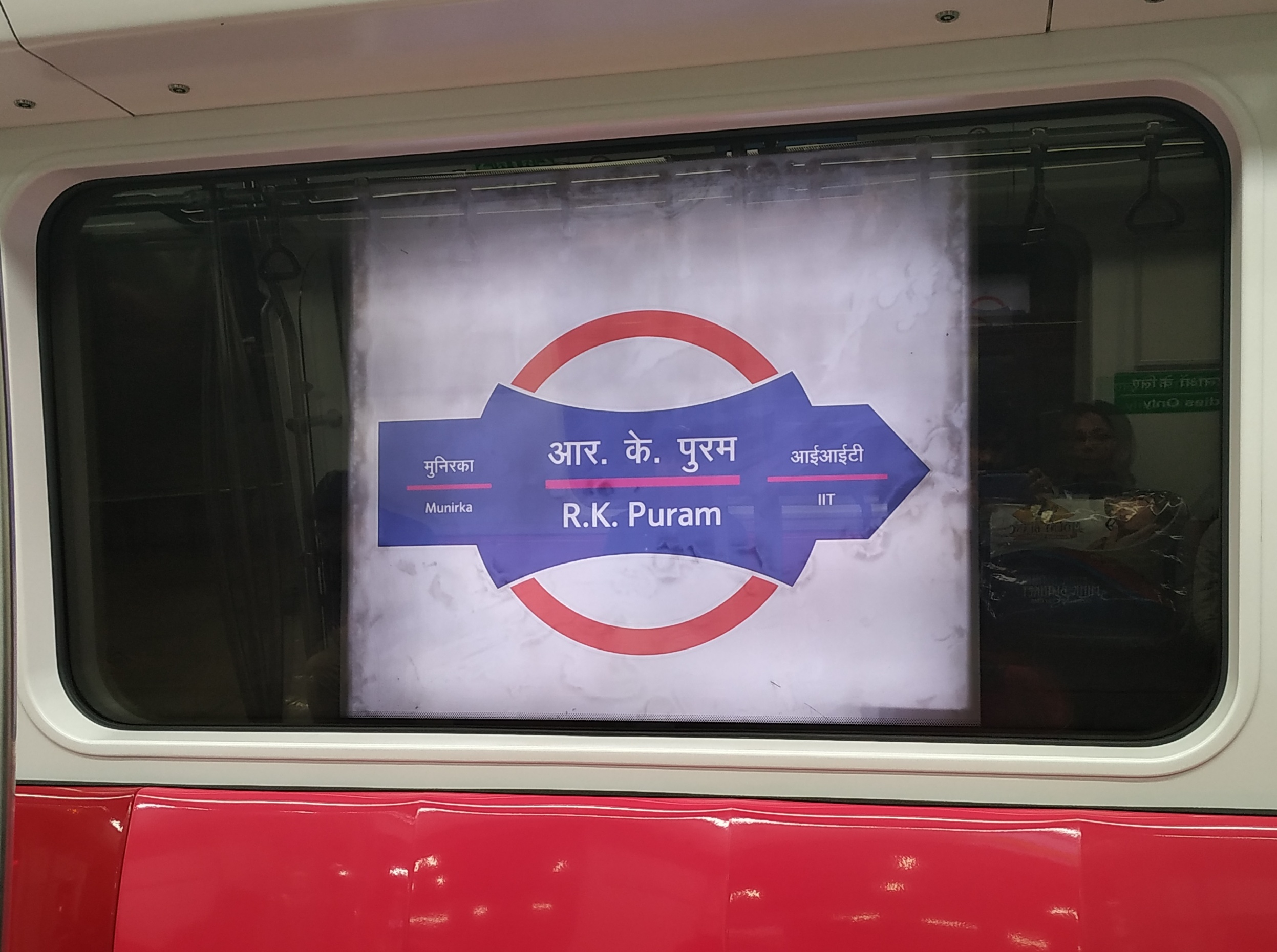

General information
- Location: RK Puram, New Delhi, Delhi, 110066
- Coordinates: 28°33′02″N 77°11′06″E
- System: Delhi Metro station
- Owner: Delhi Metro
- Operator: Delhi Metro Rail Corporation (DMRC)
- Line: Magenta Line
- Platforms: Island platform Platform-1 → Botanical Garden; Platform-2 → Inderlok
- Tracks: 2

Construction
- Structure type: Underground, Double-track
- Platform levels: 2
- Accessible: Disabled access

Other information
- Status: Staffed, Operational
- Station code: RKPM

History
- Opened: 29 May 2018; 8 years ago
- Electrified: 25 kV 50 Hz AC through overhead catenary

Services
Preceding station	Delhi Metro	Following station
Munirka towards Inderlok	Magenta Line	IIT towards Botanical Garden
Route map
Location

The R. K. Puram metro station is located on the Magenta Line of the Delhi Metro.

As part of Phase III of Delhi Metro, R.K Puram is the metro station of the Magenta Line which became fully operational on 29 May 2018.

== The station ==
=== Station layout ===
G	Street Level	Exit/ Entrance
C	Concourse	Fare control, station agent, Ticket/token, shops
P	Platform 1 Eastbound	Towards → Botanical Garden; Next Station: IIT
P	Island platform | Doors will open on the right
P	Platform 2 Westbound	Towards ← Inderlok; Next Station: Munirka

== Entry/exit ==
R. K. Puram metro station Entry/exits
Gate No-1	Gate No-2	Gate No-3	Gate No-4	Gate No-5
R K Khanna Tennis Stadium	R K Khanna Tennis Stadium	DDA Sports Complex Ground	Rose Garden	Ber Sarai
R. K. Puram Sector 3	R. K. Puram Sector 3		IIT Delhi	IIT Hostel
				Institute of Secretariat Training and Management
				Central Soil and Material Research Station

== Connections ==
=== Bus ===
Delhi Transport Corporation bus routes number 344, 448, 448CL, 507CL, 620, 764, 764EXT, 764S, 774, AC-620, AC-764, serves the station from nearby IIT Hostel bus stop.

== See also ==
- Delhi
- List of Delhi Metro stations
- Transport in Delhi
- Delhi Metro Rail Corporation
- Delhi Suburban Railway
- Delhi Monorail
- Delhi Transport Corporation
- South East Delhi
- Rama Krishna Puram
- National Capital Region (India)
- List of rapid transit systems
- List of metro systems
