= Munirka metro station =

Metro station in Delhi, India

Munirka

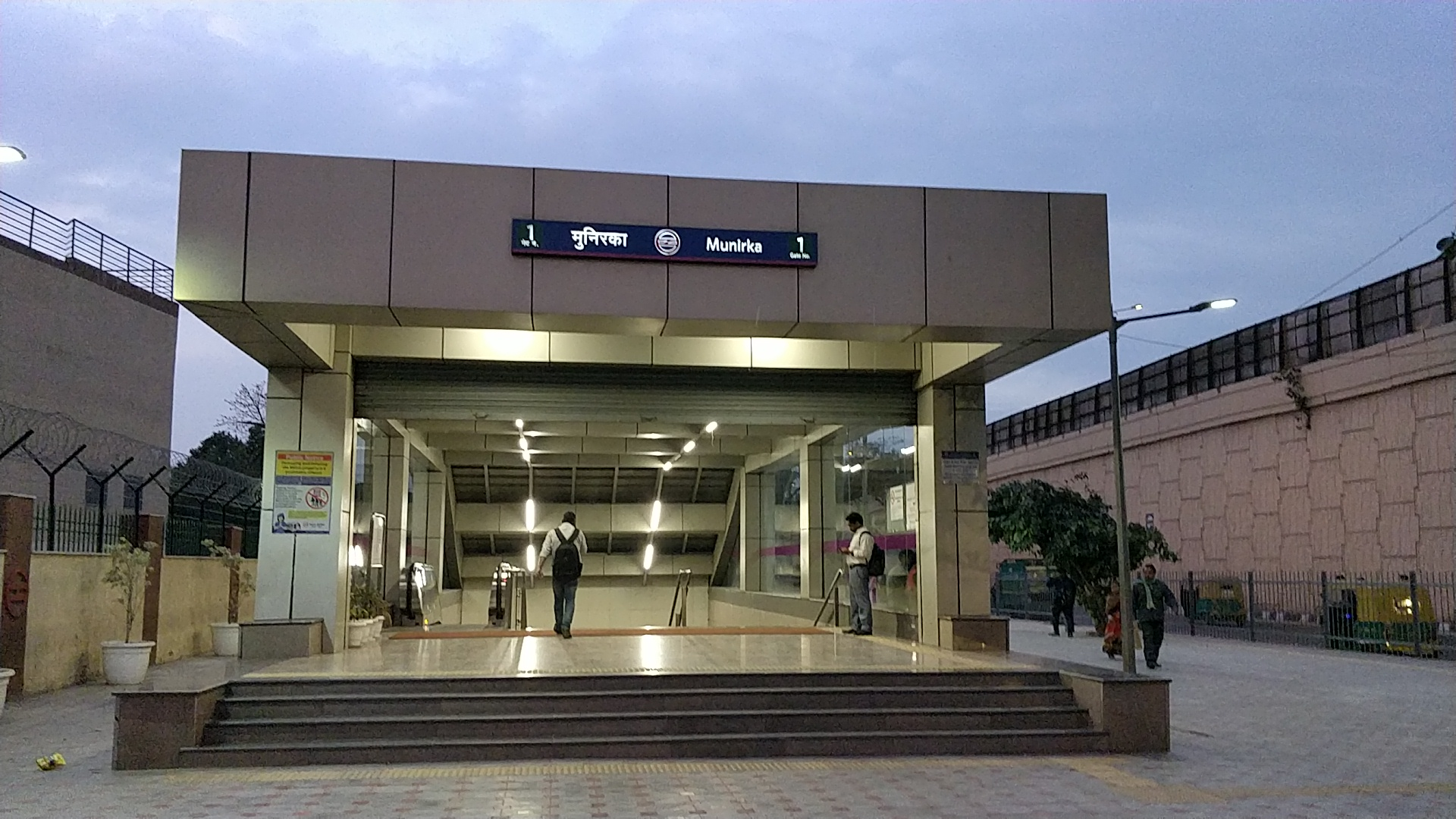

General information
- Location: Palam Flyover, Sector 4, Munirka, New Delhi, Delhi 110022
- Coordinates: 28°33′28″N 77°10′26″E
- System: Delhi Metro station
- Owner: Delhi Metro
- Operator: Delhi Metro Rail Corporation (DMRC)
- Line: Magenta Line
- Platforms: Island platform Platform-1 → Botanical Garden; Platform-2 → Inderlok
- Tracks: 2

Construction
- Structure type: Underground, Double-track
- Platform levels: 2
- Accessible: Yes

Other information
- Status: Staffed, Operational
- Station code: MIRK

History
- Opened: 29 May 2018; 8 years ago
- Electrified: 25 kV 50 Hz AC through overhead catenary

Services
Preceding station	Delhi Metro	Following station
Vasant Vihar towards Inderlok	Magenta Line	R. K. Puram towards Botanical Garden
Route map
Location

The Munirka metro station is located on the Magenta Line of the Delhi Metro. It was opened to public on 29 May 2018.

== The station ==
=== Station layout ===
G	Street Level	Exit/ Entrance
C	Concourse	Fare control, station agent, Ticket/token, shops
P	Platform 1 Eastbound	Towards → Botanical Garden; Next Station: R. K. Puram
P	Island platform | Doors will open on the right
P	Platform 2 Westbound	Towards ← Inderlok; Next Station: Vasant Vihar

== Entry/exit ==
Munirka metro station Entry/exits
Gate No-1	Gate No-2	Gate No-3
R.K. PURAM SEC 4/SUBWAY TO MUNIRKA	OUTER RING ROAD/OPP. MUNIRKA MARKET	MUNIRKA MARKET/OPP. SEC 4 R.K. PURAM

== Connections ==
=== Bus ===
Delhi Transport Corporation bus routes number 0OMS (-), 448, 448CL, 507CL, 511, 511A, 523, 578C, 615, 620, 621, 680, 764, 764EXT, 764S, 765, 774, 836 578LT, AC-615, AC-620, AC-764, OMS (+) AC, OMS (-), serves the station from nearby Munirka bus stop.

== See also ==
- Delhi
- List of Delhi Metro stations
- Transport in Delhi
- Delhi Metro Rail Corporation
- Delhi Suburban Railway
- Delhi Monorail
- Delhi Transport Corporation
- South West Delhi
- Munirka
- National Capital Region (India)
- List of rapid transit systems
- List of metro systems
