= IIT metro station =

Metro station in Delhi, India

IIT

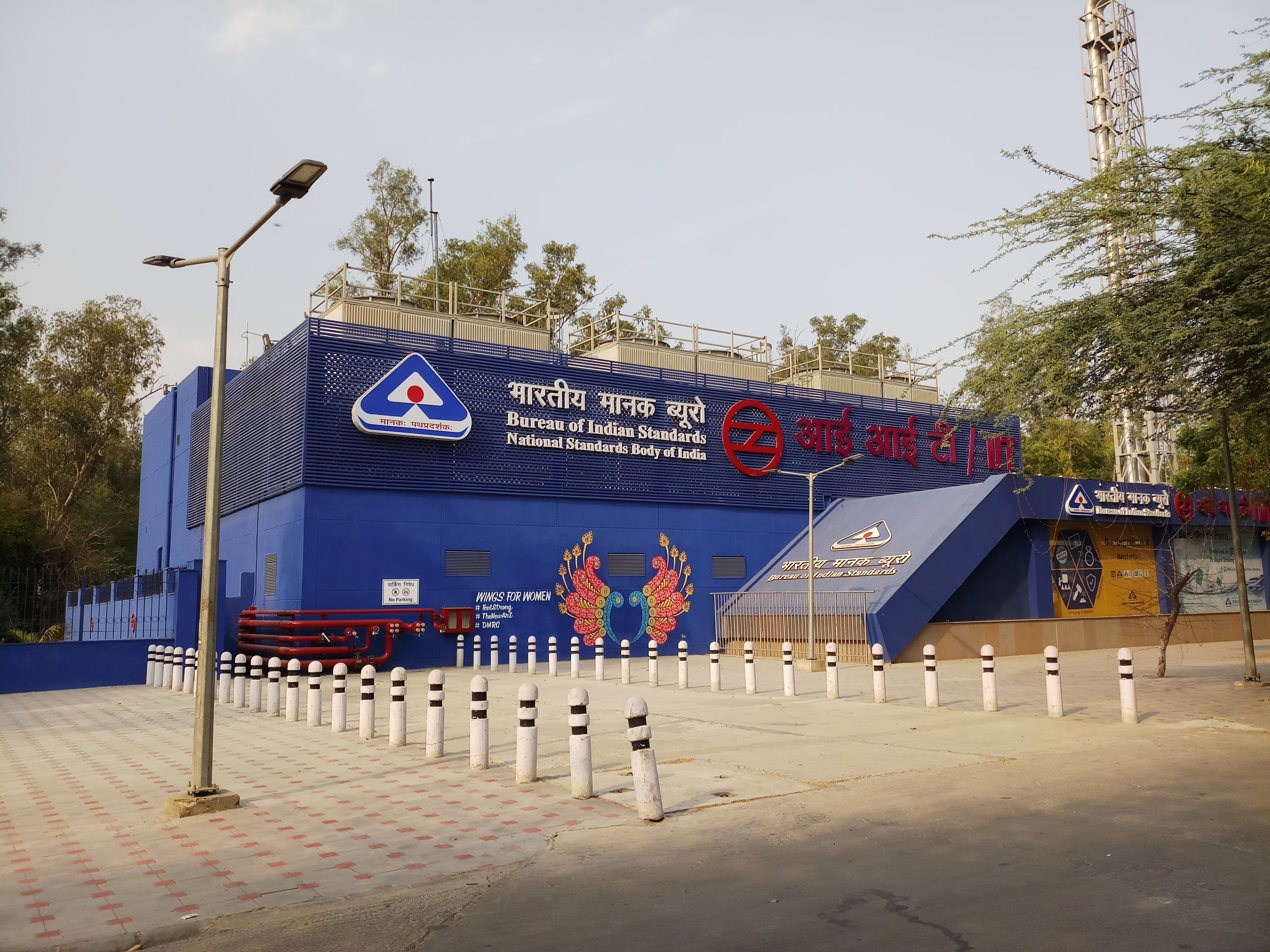

General information
- Location: IIT Delhi Main Rd, IIT Campus, Hauz Khas, New Delhi, Delhi 110016
- Coordinates: 28.5472°N 77.1938°E
- System: Delhi Metro station
- Owner: Delhi Metro
- Operator: Delhi Metro Rail Corporation (DMRC)
- Line: Magenta Line
- Platforms: Island platform Platform-1 → Botanical Garden; Platform-2 → Inderlok
- Tracks: 2

Construction
- Structure type: Underground, Double-track
- Platform levels: 2
- Accessible: Yes

Other information
- Status: Staffed, Operational
- Station code: IIT

History
- Opened: 29 May 2018; 8 years ago
- Electrified: 25 kV 50 Hz AC through overhead catenary

Services
Preceding station	Delhi Metro	Following station
R. K. Puram towards Inderlok	Magenta Line	Hauz Khas towards Botanical Garden
Route map
Location

IIT metro station is located on the Magenta Line of the Delhi Metro. It commenced commercial operations on 29 May 2018, as part of the Janakpuri West–Kalkaji Mandir corridor.

== History ==
The IIT metro station was opened to the public on 29 May 2018, as part of the Janakpuri West–Botanical Garden section of the Magenta Line. It was named after the nearby Indian Institute of Technology Delhi (IIT Delhi), whose campus is located adjacent to the station.

== Controversy ==
In May 2018, IIT Delhi objected to the station's co-branding as "FIITJEE-IIT" after the coaching institute acquired its semi-naming rights through an agreement with an outdoor advertising agency. IIT Delhi argued that the combined branding could mislead students and the public into believing that the institute was associated with FIITJEE. The institute approached the Delhi High Court and the central government over the matter. In June 2018, the court directed that a disclaimer clarifying the absence of any association between the two institutions be displayed alongside the branding. In September, DMRC temporarily covered the FIITJEE signage following a dispute over compliance with the court's directions. In December 2018, the advertising agency terminated its branding agreement with FIITJEE, and the station's co-branding rights were subsequently transferred to the Bureau of Indian Standards (BIS).

The FIITJEE branding was subsequently removed from the station, and the new signage displayed the names of IIT Delhi and the Bureau of Indian Standards (BIS).

Commenting on the resolution of the dispute, IIT Delhi director V. Ramgopal Rao said that the institute did not want its name associated with a coaching institute having commercial interests. He welcomed the association with BIS, stating that it aligned with the institute's image, as both organisations set standards in their respective domains. BIS is India's national standards body and functions under the aegis of the Ministry of Consumer Affairs, Food and Public Distribution.

== Station layout ==
G	Street level	Exit/Entrance
C	Concourse	Fare control, station agent, Ticket/token, shops
P	Platform 1 Eastbound	Towards → Botanical Garden; Next Station: Hauz Khas Change at the next stop for Yellow Line
P	Island platform | Doors will open on the right
P	Platform 2 Westbound	Towards ← Inderlok; Next Station: R. K. Puram

== Entry/Exit ==
IIT metro station Entry/Exit
Gate No-1	Gate No-2	Gate No-3
Rose Garden	SDA Market	IIT Delhi

== Connections ==
=== Bus ===
Delhi Transport Corporation bus routes number 344, 448, 448B, 448CL, 507CL, 620, 764, 764EXT, 764S, 774, AC-620, AC-764, serves the station from nearby IIT Gate bus stop.

== See also ==
- Delhi
- List of Delhi Metro stations
- Transport in Delhi
- Delhi Metro Rail Corporation
- Delhi Suburban Railway
- Delhi Monorail
- Delhi Transport Corporation
- South East Delhi
- Indian Institute of Technology Delhi
- National Capital Region (India)
- List of rapid transit systems
- List of metro systems
