= Sadar Bazar Cantonment metro station =

Metro station in Delhi, India

Sadar Bazar Cantonment

General information
- Location: Sadar Bazaar Cantonment, Shekhawati Lines, Delhi Cantonment, New Delhi, Delhi 110010
- Coordinates: 28.5771°N 77.1113°E
- System: Delhi Metro station
- Owner: Delhi Metro
- Operator: Delhi Metro Rail Corporation (DMRC)
- Line: Magenta Line
- Platforms: Side platform Platform-1 → Botanical Garden; Platform-2 → Inderlok
- Tracks: 2

Construction
- Structure type: Elevated, Double-track
- Platform levels: 2
- Accessible: Yes

Other information
- Status: Staffed, Operational
- Station code: SABR

History
- Opened: 29 May 2018; 8 years ago
- Electrified: 25 kV 50 Hz AC through overhead catenary

Services
Preceding station	Delhi Metro	Following station
Palam towards Inderlok	Magenta Line	Terminal 1-IGI Airport towards Botanical Garden
Route map
Location

The Sadar Bazar Cantonment metro station is an elevated metro station located on the Magenta Line of the Delhi Metro. It was opened to public on 29 May 2018. Like Shankar Vihar, this station also falls under Delhi Cantonment.

== Construction ==
Sadar Bazar Cantonment was constructed as part of the Janakpuri West–Kalkaji Mandir section of the Delhi Metro's Phase III Magenta Line. It was one of the two elevated stations on this 25.6-km section. The section was inaugurated on 28 May 2018, and opened to the public on 29 May 2018.

== Station layout ==
L2	Side platform | Doors will open on the left
L2	Platform 1 Eastbound	Towards → Botanical Garden; Next Station: Terminal 1 IGI Airport
L2	Platform 2 Westbound	Towards ← Inderlok; Next Station: Palam
L2	Side platform | Doors will open on the left
L1	Concourse	Fare control, station agent, Metro Card vending machines, crossover
G	Street Level	Exit/Entrance

== Facilities ==
The station has toilet facilities in the paid concourse. No ATM facility is available at the station.

== Entry/Exit ==
Sadar Bazar Cantonment metro station Entry/exits
Gate No-1	Gate No-2
Air Force Museum; Institute of Aerospace Safety	Shekhawati Lines; Sadar Bazaar, Delhi Cantt

== See also ==
- Delhi
- List of Delhi Metro stations
- Transport in Delhi
- Delhi Metro Rail Corporation
- Delhi Suburban Railway
- Delhi Monorail
- Delhi Transport Corporation
- South West Delhi
- National Capital Region (India)
- List of rapid transit systems
- List of metro systems
