= Deepali Chowk metro station =

Metro Station in Delhi, India

Deepali Chowk

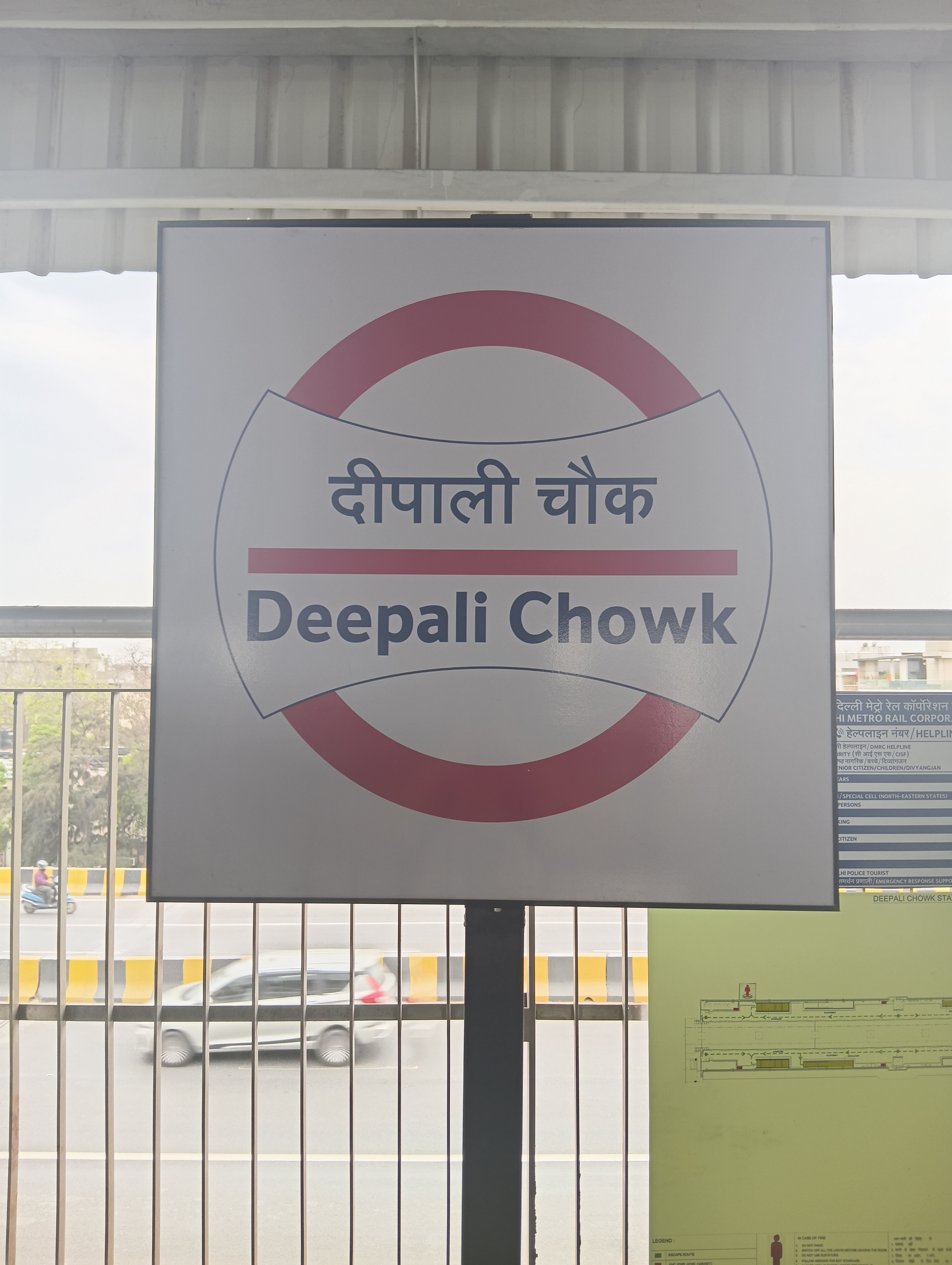

General information
- Location: Deepali Chowk, Outer Ring Road, Naharpur Village Road, Sector 3/8, Rohini, Delhi, 110085 / Pitampura, Delhi, 110034
- System: Delhi Metro station
- Owner: Delhi Metro
- Operator: Delhi Metro Rail Corporation (DMRC)
- Line: Magenta Line
- Platforms: Side platform Platform 1 → Train terminates Platform 2 → Majlis Park
- Tracks: 2

Construction
- Structure type: Elevated, Double-track
- Platform levels: 2
- Accessible: Yes

Other information
- Status: Operational

History
- Opened: 8 March 2026; 5 months ago
- Electrified: 25 kV 50 Hz AC through overhead catenary

Services
Preceding station	Delhi Metro	Following station
Madhuban Chowk towards Majlis Park	Magenta Line	Terminus
Future service
Madhuban Chowk towards Ramakrishna Ashram Marg	Magenta Line	Pushpanjali towards Botanical Garden
Route map
Location

Deepali Chowk is a metro station on the Magenta Line of the Delhi Metro. This station is part of Phase IV of Delhi Metro. This station was opened for public on 8 March 2026.

== Station layout ==
L2	Side platform | Doors will open on the left
L2	Platform 1 Southbound	Towards → Train terminates here
L2	Platform 2 Northbound	Towards ← Majlis Park; Next Station: Madhuban Chowk; Change at the next station for Red Line
L2	Side platform | Doors will open on the left
L1	Concourse	Fare control, station agent, Metro Card vending machines, crossover
G	Street Level	Exit/Entrance

== See also ==
- Delhi
- List of Delhi Metro stations
- Transport in Delhi
- Delhi Monorail
- Delhi Transport Corporation
