= List of Delhi Metro stations =

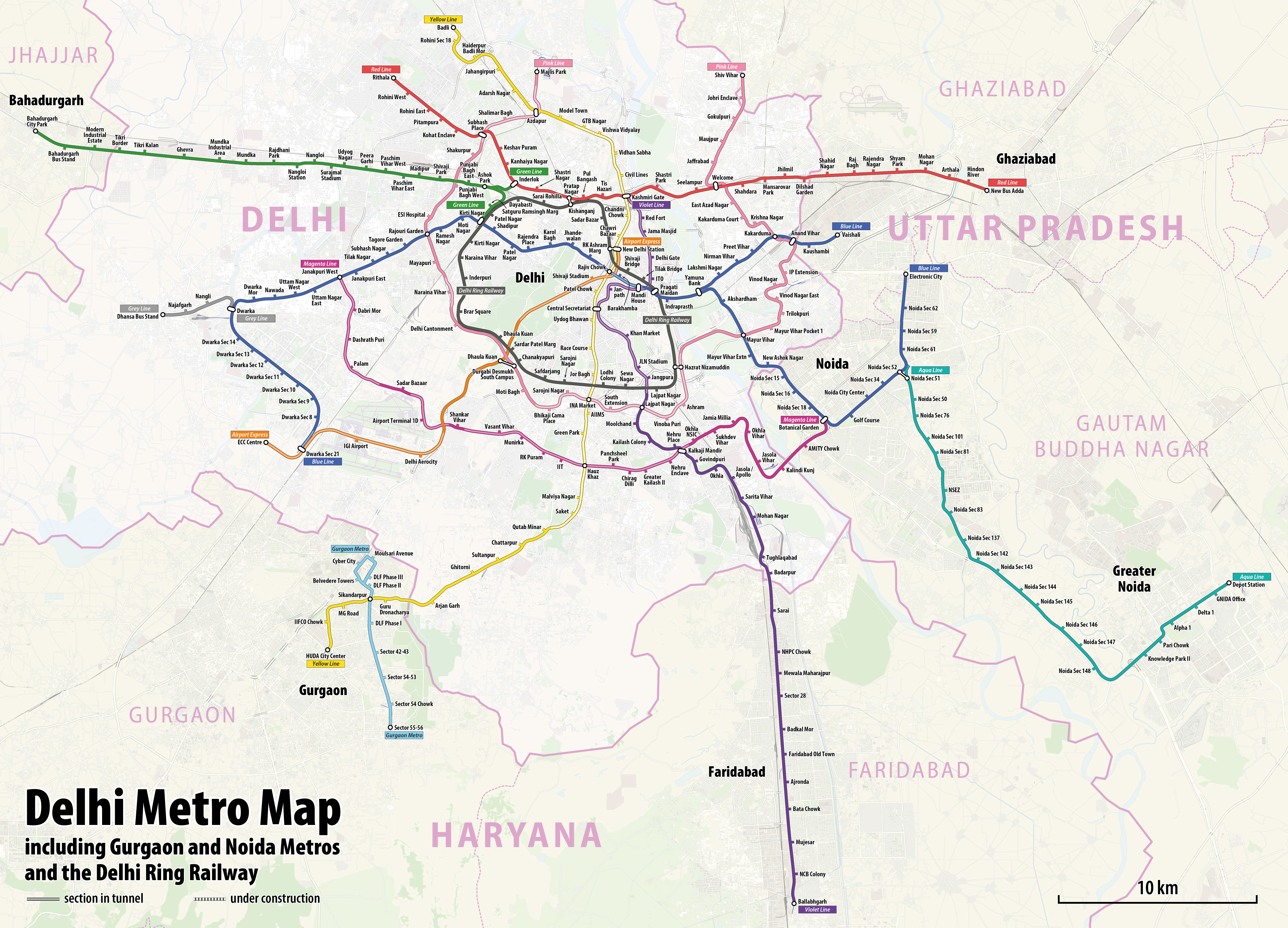
Delhi Metro Network map (as of February 2020)

This is a list of all stations of the Delhi Metro, a rapid transit system serving Delhi and its satellite cities in the National Capital Region of India. The network consists of 10 colour-coded lines serving 271 stations (Note: Transfer stations are counted more than once. There are 27 transfer stations. If transfer stations are counted only once, the result will be 244 stations. Ashok Park Main station, where the two diverging branches of Green Line share tracks/platforms, is anyway counted as a single station. Also Maujpur - Babarpur station, where the two branches of Pink Line share tracks/platforms, is anyway counted as a single station which is also a Terminus for the branch line. Stations of Noida Metro and Gurgaon Metro are not counted. If stations of Noida Metro and Gurgaon Metro are counted, the result will be 303 stations.) with a total length of 374.47 kilometres (232.68 mi). (Note: The total length of Delhi Metro is 374.47 kilometres (232.68 mi). The operations & maintenance of Gurgaon Metro and Noida Metro is currently undertaken by DMRC, so the total length operated by DMRC is 416.49 kilometres (258.79 mi).) Delhi Metro is built and operated by the Delhi Metro Rail Corporation Limited (DMRC) and the first section was opened on 25 December 2002 on the Red Line.

Sikanderpur station offers an interchange with Gurgaon Metro via a 90 m × 9 m walkway.

Noida Sector 52 station offers an interchange with Noida Metro.

Each line of the Delhi Metro is identified by a specific colour. The system uses rolling stocks of both broad gauge and standard gauge trains, and has a combination of elevated, underground and at-grade lines. The Metro is open from about 05:00 to 00:00, with trains operating at a peak frequency of 2–3 minutes, and has an average daily count of 2,760,000 commuters.

== Statistics ==
| Layout | Stations |
|---|---|
| Elevated stations | 193 |
| Underground stations | 71 |
| At-grade stations | 7 |
| Total | 271* |

* Transfer stations are counted more than once. There are 27 transfer stations: 26 transfer stations serving 2 lines and 1 transfer station serving 3 lines. If transfer stations are counted only once, the result will be 243 stations.

- Metro stations under construction: 69
- Metro stations planned/ proposed: 77

== Metro stations ==
| † | Terminal station |
| * | Transfer station |
| †* | Terminal and transfer station to other lines |
| †† | Transfer station to Indian Railways / ISBT |
| ** | Transfer station to other lines and Indian Railways / ISBT |
| #* | Terminal and transfer station to Indian Railways / ISBT |
| †¤ | Terminal, transfer station to other lines and Indian Railways / ISBT |

| Station name | Line | Opened | Station layout | Platform layout | Notes | Refs |
|---|---|---|---|---|---|---|
| Adarsh Nagar | Yellow Line | 4 February 2009 | Elevated | Side | – | |
| AIIMS | Yellow Line | 3 September 2010 | Underground | Island | – | |
| Akshardham | Blue Line | 12 November 2009 | Elevated | Side | – | |
| Anand Vihar** | Blue Line | 6 January 2010 | Elevated | Side | Transfer station for Anand Vihar Railway Terminal (Indian Railways), Anand Vihar ISBT and Anand Vihar RRTS station | |
| Anand Vihar** | Pink Line | 31 October 2018 | Elevated | Side | Transfer station for Anand Vihar Railway Terminal (Indian Railways), Anand Vihar ISBT and Anand Vihar RRTS station | |
| Arjan Garh | Yellow Line | 21 June 2010 | Elevated | Side | – | |
| Arthala | Red Line | 8 March 2019 | Elevated | Side | – | |
| Ashok Park Main* | Green Line | 2 April 2010 | Elevated | Side | Transfer for Branch Line | |
| Ashram | Pink Line | 31 December 2018 | Underground | Island | – | |
| Azadpur* | Yellow Line | 4 February 2009 | Elevated | Side | – | |
| Azadpur* | Pink Line | 14 March 2018 | Underground | Island | – | |
| Badarpur Border | Violet Line | 14 January 2011 | Elevated | Side | Formerly known as Badarpur | |
| Badkhal Mor | Violet Line | 6 September 2015 | Elevated | Side | – | |
| Bahadurgarh City | Green Line | 24 June 2018 | Elevated | Side | Formerly known as Bus Stand | |
| Barakhamba Road†† | Blue Line | 30 December 2005 | Underground | Side | Transfer station for Shivaji Bridge Railway Station | |
| Bata Chowk | Violet Line | 6 September 2015 | Elevated | Side | – | |
| Bhajanpura | Pink Line | 8 March 2026 | Elevated | Side | – | |
| Bhalaswa | Magenta Line | 8 March 2026 | Elevated | Side | – | |
| Bhikaji Cama Place | Pink Line | 6 August 2018 | Underground | Island | – | |
| Botanical Garden†* | Blue Line | 12 November 2009 | Elevated | Side | – | |
| Botanical Garden†* | Magenta Line | 25 December 2017 | Elevated | Side | – | |
| Brigadier Hoshiyar Singh† | Green Line | 24 June 2018 | Elevated | Side | Formerly known as City Park | |
| Burari | Pink Line | 8 March 2026 | Elevated | Side | – | |
| Central Secretariat* | Yellow Line | 3 July 2005 | Underground | Side | – | |
| Central Secretariat* | Violet Line | 3 October 2010 | Underground | Side | – | |
| Chandni Chowk†† | Yellow Line | 3 July 2005 | Underground | Island | Formerly known as Delhi Main. Transfer station for Delhi Junction Railway station. | |
| Chawri Bazar | Yellow Line | 3 July 2005 | Underground | Island | Second Deepest Metro Station of Delhi | |
| Chhatarpur | Yellow Line | 26 August 2010 | Elevated | Side | – | |
| Chirag Delhi | Magenta Line | 29 May 2018 | Underground | Island | – | |
| Civil Lines | Yellow Line | 20 December 2004 | Underground | Side | – | |
| Dabri Mor - Janakpuri South | Magenta Line | 29 May 2018 | Underground | Island | Formerly known as Dabri Mor | |
| Dashrathpuri | Magenta Line | 29 May 2018 | Underground | Island | – | |
| Deepali Chowk | Magenta Line | 8 March 2026 | Elevated | Side | – | |
| Delhi Aerocity | Airport Express | 15 August 2011 | Underground | Side | Also known as National Highway 8 | |
| Delhi Cantonment | Pink Line | 14 March 2018 | Elevated | Side | – | |
| Delhi Gate | Violet Line | 28 May 2017 | Underground | Island | – | |
| Dhansa Bus Stand† | Grey Line | 18 September 2021 | Underground | Side | – | |
| Dhaula Kuan* | Airport Express | 15 August 2011 | Elevated | Side | Transfer Station to Pink Line | |
| Dilli Haat - INA* | Yellow Line | 3 September 2010 | Underground | Island | Formerly known as INA | |
| Dilli Haat - INA* | Pink Line | 6 August 2018 | Underground | Island | Formerly known as INA | |
| Dilshad Garden | Red Line | 4 June 2008 | Elevated | Side | – | |
| Dr. Baba Saheb Ambedkar Hospital | Red Line | 31 March 2004 | Elevated | Side | Formerly known as Rohini West | |
| Durgabai Deshmukh South Campus* | Pink Line | 14 March 2018 | Elevated | Side | For Delhi University South Campus | |
| Dwarka-Kakrola†* | Blue Line | 30 December 2005 | Elevated | Side | Formerly known as Dwarka | |
| Dwarka-Kakrola†* | Grey Line | 4 October 2019 | Elevated | Side | Formerly known as Dwarka | |
| Dwarka Mor | Blue Line | 30 December 2005 | Elevated | Side | Mostly popular for NSUT and road to airport | |
| Dwarka Sector 8 | Blue Line | 30 October 2010 | Elevated | Side | – | |
| Dwarka Sector 9 | Blue Line | 1 April 2006 | Elevated | Side | – | |
| Dwarka Sector 10 | Blue Line | 1 April 2006 | Elevated | Side | – | |
| Dwarka Sector 11 | Blue Line | 1 April 2006 | Elevated | Side | – | |
| Dwarka Sector 12 | Blue Line | 1 April 2006 | Elevated | Side | – | |
| Dwarka Sector 13 | Blue Line | 1 April 2006 | Elevated | Side | – | |
| Dwarka Sector 14 | Blue Line | 1 April 2006 | Elevated | Side | – | |
| Dwarka Sector 21†* | Blue Line | 30 October 2010 | Underground | Side | – | |
| Dwarka Sector 21†* | Airport Express | 23 February 2011 | Underground | Side | – | |
| East Azad Nagar | Pink Line | 31 October 2018 | Elevated | Side | – | |
| East Vinod Nagar - Mayur Vihar-II | Pink Line | 31 October 2018 | Elevated | Side | Formerly known as East Vinod Nagar | |
| Escorts Mujesar | Violet Line | 6 September 2015 | Elevated | Side | Formerly known as YMCA Chowk | |
| ESI - Basaidarapur | Pink Line | 14 March 2018 | Elevated | Side | Formerly known as ESI Hospital | |
| Ghevra | Green Line | 24 June 2018 | Elevated | Side | – | |
| Ghitorni | Yellow Line | 21 June 2010 | Elevated | Side | – | |
| Gokulpuri | Pink Line | 31 October 2018 | Elevated | Side | – | |
| Golf Course | Blue Line | 12 November 2009 | Elevated | Side | – | |
| Govindpuri | Violet Line | 3 October 2010 | Elevated | Side | – | |
| Greater Kailash | Magenta Line | 29 May 2018 | Underground | Island | – | |
| Green Park | Yellow Line | 3 September 2010 | Underground | Island | – | |
| Guru Tegh Bahadur Nagar | Yellow Line | 4 February 2009 | Underground | Side | Formerly known as GTB Nagar | |
| Guru Dronacharya | Yellow Line | 21 June 2010 | Elevated | Side | Formerly known as Garden Estate | |
| Haiderpur Badli Mor* | Yellow Line | 10 November 2015 | Elevated | Island | Formerly known as Badli Mor | |
| Haiderpur Badli Mor* | Magenta Line | 8 March 2026 | Elevated | Island | Formerly known as Badli Mor | |
| Haiderpur Village | Magenta Line | 8 March 2026 | Elevated | Side | – | |
| Harkesh Nagar Okhla | Violet Line | 3 October 2010 | Elevated | Side | Formerly known as Okhla | |
| Hauz Khas* | Yellow Line | 3 September 2010 | Underground | Island | Deepest Metro Station in Delhi | |
| Hauz Khas* | Magenta Line | 29 May 2018 | Underground | Island | Deepest Metro Station in Delhi | |
| Hindon River | Red Line | 8 March 2019 | Elevated | Side | – | |
| IFFCO Chowk | Yellow Line | 21 June 2010 | Elevated | Side | – | |
| IIT | Magenta Line | 29 May 2018 | Underground | Island | For IIT Delhi | |
| Inderlok†* | Red Line | 3 October 2003 | Elevated | Side | Formerly known as Trinagar | |
| Inderlok†* | Green Line | 2 April 2010 | Elevated | Island | Formerly known as Trinagar | |
| Indira Gandhi International Airport | Airport Express | 23 February 2011 | Underground | Island | For Indira Gandhi International Airport's Terminal 2 & 3 | |
| Indraprastha | Blue Line | 11 November 2006 | Elevated | Side | – | |
| IP Extension | Pink Line | 31 October 2018 | Elevated | Side | – | |
| ITO | Violet Line | 8 June 2015 | Underground | Island | – | |
| Jaffrabad | Pink Line | 31 October 2018 | Elevated | Side | – | |
| Jagatpur - Wazirabad | Pink Line | 8 March 2026 | Elevated | Side | – | |
| Jahangirpuri | Yellow Line | 4 February 2009 | Elevated | Side | – | |
| Jama Masjid | Violet Line | 28 May 2017 | Underground | Island | – | |
| Jamia Millia Islamia | Magenta Line | 25 December 2017 | Elevated | Side | – | |
| Janakpuri East | Blue Line | 30 December 2005 | Elevated | Side | – | |
| Janakpuri West* | Blue Line | 30 December 2005 | Elevated | Side | Has India's Tallest Escalator connecting the concourse to Magenta Line | |
| Janakpuri West* | Magenta Line | 29 May 2018 | Underground | Island | Has India's Tallest Escalator connecting the concourse to Magenta Line | |
| Jangpura | Violet Line | 3 October 2010 | Underground | Island | Formerly known as Lodi Colony | |
| Janpath | Violet Line | 26 June 2014 | Underground | Island | – | |
| Jasola Apollo | Violet Line | 3 October 2010 | Elevated | Side | Formerly known as Jasola | |
| Jasola Vihar Shaheen Bagh | Magenta Line | 25 December 2017 | Elevated | Side | – | |
| Jawaharlal Nehru Stadium | Violet Line | 3 October 2010 | Underground | Island | – | |
| Jhandewalan | Blue Line | 30 December 2005 | Elevated | Side | – | |
| Jharoda Majra | Pink Line | 8 March 2026 | Elevated | Side | – | |
| Jhilmil | Red Line | 4 June 2008 | Elevated | Side | – | |
| Johri Enclave | Pink Line | 31 October 2018 | Elevated | Side | – | |
| Jor Bagh | Yellow Line | 3 September 2010 | Underground | Island | – | |
| Kailash Colony | Violet Line | 3 October 2010 | Elevated | Side | – | |
| Kalindi Kunj | Magenta Line | 25 December 2017 | Elevated | Side | – | |
| Kalkaji Mandir* | Violet Line | 3 October 2010 | Elevated | Side | – | |
| Kalkaji Mandir* | Magenta Line | 25 December 2017 | Underground | Side | – | |
| Kanhaiya Nagar | Red Line | 31 March 2004 | Elevated | Side | – | |
| Karkarduma* | Blue Line | 6 January 2010 | Elevated | Side | – | |
| Karkarduma* | Pink Line | 31 October 2018 | Elevated | Side | – | |
| Karkarduma Court | Pink Line | 31 October 2018 | Elevated | Side | – | |
| Karol Bagh | Blue Line | 30 December 2005 | Elevated | Side | – | |
| Kashmere Gate†¤ | Red Line | 24 December 2002 | Elevated | Side | Transfer station for Kashmere Gate ISBT India's only Metro Interchange with three lines. | |
| Kashmere Gate†¤ | Yellow Line | 20 December 2004 | Underground | Island | Transfer station for Kashmere Gate ISBT India's only Metro Interchange with three lines. | |
| Kashmere Gate†¤ | Violet Line | 28 May 2017 | Underground | Island | Transfer station for Kashmere Gate ISBT India's only Metro Interchange with three lines. | |
| Kaushambi | Blue Line | 14 July 2011 | Elevated | Side | – | |
| Keshav Puram | Red Line | 31 March 2004 | Elevated | Side | – | |
| Khajuri Khas | Pink Line | 8 March 2026 | Elevated | Side | – | |
| Khan Market | Violet Line | 3 October 2010 | Underground | Island | – | |
| Kirti Nagar†* | Blue Line | 30 December 2005 | Elevated | Side | – | |
| Kirti Nagar†* | Green Line | 27 August 2011 | At-grade | Side | – | |
| Krishna Nagar | Pink Line | 31 October 2018 | Elevated | Side | – | |
| Kohat Enclave | Red Line | 31 March 2004 | Elevated | Side | – | |
| Krishna Park Extension | Magenta Line | 5 January 2025 | Underground | Island | – | |
| Lajpat Nagar* | Violet Line | 3 October 2010 | Elevated | Side | – | |
| Lajpat Nagar* | Pink Line | 6 August 2018 | Underground | Island | – | |
| Lal Qila | Violet Line | 28 May 2017 | Underground | Island | Formerly known as Red Fort | |
| Laxmi Nagar | Blue Line | 6 January 2010 | Elevated | Side | – | |
| Lok Kalyan Marg | Yellow Line | 3 September 2010 | Underground | Island | Formerly known as Race Course | |
| Madipur | Green Line | 2 April 2010 | Elevated | Side | – | |
| Madhuban Chowk* | Red Line | 31 March 2004 | Elevated | Side | Formerly known as Pitampura | |
| Madhuban Chowk* | Magenta Line | 8 March 2026 | Elevated | Side | Formerly known as Pitampura | |
| Maharaja Surajmal Stadium | Green Line | 2 April 2010 | Elevated | Side | Formerly known as Surajmal Stadium | |
| Majlis Park†* | Pink Line | 14 March 2018 | Elevated | Side | Formerly known as Mukundpur | |
| Majlis Park†* | Magenta Line | 8 March 2026 | Elevated | Island | Formerly known as Mukundpur | |
| Major Mohit Sharma Rajendra Nagar | Red Line | 8 March 2019 | Elevated | Side | Formerly known as Rajendra Nagar | |
| Malviya Nagar | Yellow Line | 3 September 2010 | Underground | Island | – | |
| Mandawali - West Vinod Nagar | Pink Line | 31 October 2018 | Elevated | Side | Formerly known as Vinod Nagar West | |
| Mandi House* | Blue Line | 11 November 2006 | Underground | Side | – | |
| Mandi House* | Violet Line | 26 June 2014 | Underground | Island | – | |
| Mansarovar Park | Red Line | 4 June 2008 | Elevated | Side | – | |
| Maujpur - Babarpur†* | Pink Line | 31 October 2018 | Elevated | Side | Formerly known as Maujpur Also a terminus for Pink Line's Shiv Vihar branch. | |
| Mayapuri | Pink Line | 14 March 2018 | Elevated | Side | – | |
| Mayur Vihar-I* | Blue Line | 12 November 2009 | Elevated | Island | – | |
| Mayur Vihar-I* | Pink Line | 31 December 2018 | Elevated | Side | – | |
| Mayur Vihar Extension | Blue Line | 12 November 2009 | Elevated | Island | – | |
| Mewla Maharajpur | Violet Line | 6 September 2015 | Elevated | Side | – | |
| MG Road | Yellow Line | 21 June 2010 | Elevated | Side | – | |
| Millennium City Centre Gurugram† | Yellow Line | 21 June 2010 | Elevated | Side | Formerly known as HUDA City Centre | |
| Model Town | Yellow Line | 4 February 2009 | Elevated | Side | – | |
| Mohan Estate | Violet Line | 14 January 2011 | Elevated | Side | – | |
| Mohan Nagar | Red Line | 8 March 2019 | Elevated | Side | – | |
| Moolchand | Violet Line | 3 October 2010 | Elevated | Side | – | |
| Moti Nagar | Blue Line | 30 December 2005 | Elevated | Side | – | |
| Mundka | Green Line | 2 April 2010 | Elevated | Side | – | |
| Mundka Industrial Area | Green Line | 24 June 2018 | Elevated | Side | – | |
| Munirka | Magenta Line | 29 May 2018 | Underground | Island | – | |
| Najafgarh | Grey Line | 4 October 2019 | Underground | Side | – | |
| Nanaksar - Sonia Vihar | Pink Line | 8 March 2026 | Elevated | Side | – | |
| Nangli | Grey Line | 4 October 2019 | Elevated | Side | – | |
| Nangloi | Green Line | 2 April 2010 | Elevated | Side | – | |
| Nangloi Railway Station†† | Green Line | 2 April 2010 | Elevated | Side | Transfer station for Nangloi railway station (Indian Railways) | |
| Naraina Vihar | Pink Line | 14 March 2018 | Underground | Island | – | |
| Nawada | Blue Line | 30 December 2005 | Elevated | Side | – | |
| Neelam Chowk Ajronda | Violet Line | 6 September 2015 | Elevated | Side | Formerly known as Ajronda | |
| Nehru Enclave | Magenta Line | 29 May 2018 | Underground | Island | – | |
| Nehru Place | Violet Line | 3 October 2010 | Elevated | Side | – | |
| Netaji Subhash Place* | Red Line | 31 March 2004 | Elevated | Side | Formerly known as Wazirpur | |
| Netaji Subhash Place* | Pink Line | 14 March 2018 | Underground | Side | Formerly known as Wazirpur | |
| New Ashok Nagar | Blue Line | 12 November 2009 | Elevated | Side | Transfer station for New Ashok Nagar RRTS station | |
| New Delhi†¤ | Yellow Line | 3 July 2005 | Underground | Island | Transfer station for New Delhi Railway Station (Indian Railways) and Airport Express | |
| New Delhi†¤ | Airport Express | 23 February 2011 | Underground | Island | Transfer station for New Delhi Railway Station (Indian Railways) and Airport Express | |
| NHPC Chowk | Violet Line | 6 September 2015 | Elevated | Side | – | |
| Nirman Vihar | Blue Line | 6 January 2010 | Elevated | Side | – | |
| Noida City Centre | Blue Line | 12 November 2009 | Elevated | Side | – | |
| Noida Electronic City† | Blue Line | 9 March 2019 | Elevated | Side | – | |
| Noida Sector 15 | Blue Line | 12 November 2009 | Elevated | Side | – | |
| Noida Sector 16 | Blue Line | 12 November 2009 | Elevated | Side | – | |
| Noida Sector 18 | Blue Line | 12 November 2009 | Elevated | Side | – | |
| Noida Sector 34 | Blue Line | 9 March 2019 | Elevated | Side | – | |
| Noida Sector 52* | Blue Line | 9 March 2019 | Elevated | Side | Transfer station for Aqua Line (Noida Metro) | |
| Noida Sector 59 | Blue Line | 9 March 2019 | Elevated | Side | – | |
| Noida Sector 61 | Blue Line | 9 March 2019 | Elevated | Side | – | |
| Noida Sector 62 | Blue Line | 9 March 2019 | Elevated | Side | – | |
| Okhla Bird Sanctuary | Magenta Line | 25 December 2017 | Elevated | Side | – | |
| Okhla NSIC | Magenta Line | 25 December 2017 | Elevated | Side | – | |
| Okhla Vihar | Magenta Line | 25 December 2017 | Elevated | Side | – | |
| Old Faridabad | Violet Line | 6 September 2015 | Elevated | Side | – | |
| Palam | Magenta Line | 29 May 2018 | Underground | Island | – | |
| Panchsheel Park | Magenta Line | 29 May 2018 | Underground | Island | – | |
| Pandit Shree Ram Sharma | Green Line | 24 June 2018 | Elevated | Side | Formerly known as Modern Industrial Estate | |
| Paschim Vihar East | Green Line | 2 April 2010 | Elevated | Side | – | |
| Paschim Vihar West | Green Line | 2 April 2010 | Elevated | Side | – | |
| Patel Chowk | Yellow Line | 3 July 2005 | Underground | Island | – | |
| Patel Nagar | Blue Line | 30 December 2005 | Elevated | Side | – | |
| Peeragarhi | Green Line | 2 April 2010 | Elevated | Side | – | |
| Pratap Nagar†† | Red Line | 3 October 2003 | Elevated | Side | Transfer station for Subzi Mandi railway station (Indian Railways) | |
| Preet Vihar | Blue Line | 6 January 2010 | Elevated | Side | – | |
| Pulbangash | Red Line | 3 October 2003 | Elevated | Side | – | |
| Punjabi Bagh | Green Line | 2 April 2010 | Elevated | Side | Formerly known as Punjabi Bagh East | |
| Punjabi Bagh West* | Pink Line | 14 March 2018 | Elevated | Side | – | |
| Punjabi Bagh West* | Green Line | 29 March 2022 | Elevated | Side | – | |
| Qutab Minar | Yellow Line | 21 June 2010 | Elevated | Side | – | |
| R. K. Puram | Magenta Line | 29 May 2018 | Underground | Island | – | |
| Raja Nahar Singh (Ballabhgarh)† | Violet Line | 19 November 2018 | Elevated | Side | Formerly known as Ballabhgarh | |
| Raj Bagh | Red Line | 8 March 2019 | Elevated | Side | – | |
| Rajdhani Park | Green Line | 2 April 2010 | Elevated | Side | – | |
| Rajendra Place | Blue Line | 30 December 2005 | Elevated | Side | – | |
| Rajiv Chowk* | Yellow Line | 3 July 2005 | Underground | Island | – | |
| Rajiv Chowk* | Blue Line | 30 December 2005 | Underground | Side | – | |
| Rajouri Garden* | Blue Line | 30 December 2005 | Elevated | Side | – | |
| Rajouri Garden* | Pink Line | 14 March 2018 | Elevated | Side | – | |
| Ramakrishna Ashram Marg | Blue Line | 30 December 2005 | Elevated | Side | – | |
| Ramesh Nagar | Blue Line | 30 December 2005 | Elevated | Side | – | |
| Rithala† | Red Line | 31 March 2004 | Elevated | Side | – | |
| Rohini | Red Line | 31 March 2004 | Elevated | Side | Formerly known as Rohini East | |
| Rohini Sector 18, 19 | Yellow Line | 10 November 2015 | Elevated | Side | – | |
| Sadar Bazar Cantonment | Magenta Line | 29 May 2018 | Elevated | Side | – | |
| Saket | Yellow Line | 3 September 2010 | Underground | Island | – | |
| Samaypur Badli† | Yellow Line | 10 November 2015 | Elevated | Side | – | |
| Sant Surdas (Sihi) | Violet Line | 19 November 2018 | Elevated | Side | Formerly known as NCB (Goodyear Chowk) | |
| Sarai | Violet Line | 6 September 2015 | Elevated | Side | – | |
| Sarai Kale Khan – Nizamuddin†† | Pink Line | 31 December 2018 | Underground | Island | Transfer station for Hazrat Nizamuddin railway station (Indian Railways), Sarai Kale Khan ISBT and Sarai Kale Khan RRTS station | |
| Sarita Vihar | Violet Line | 3 October 2010 | Elevated | Side | – | |
| Sarojini Nagar | Pink Line | 6 August 2018 | Underground | Island | – | |
| Satguru Ram Singh Marg†† | Green Line | 27 August 2011 | Elevated | Side | Transfer station for Patel Nagar railway station (Indian Railways) | |
| Sector 28 | Violet Line | 6 September 2015 | Elevated | Side | – | |
| Seelampur | Red Line | 24 December 2002 | At-grade | Island | – | |
| Seva Teerth | Yellow Line | 3 September 2010 | Underground | Island | Formerly known as Udyog Bhawan | |
| Shadipur | Blue Line | 30 December 2005 | Elevated | Side | – | |
| Shahdara†† | Red Line | 24 December 2002 | At-grade | Side | Transfer station for Delhi Shahdara Junction railway station | |
| Shaheed Nagar | Red Line | 8 March 2019 | Elevated | Side | – | |
| Shaheed Sthal (New Bus Adda) | Red Line | 8 March 2019 | Elevated | Side | Formerly known as New Bus Adda | |
| Shakurpur | Pink Line | 14 March 2018 | Elevated | Island | – | |
| Shalimar Bagh | Pink Line | 14 March 2018 | Underground | Island | – | |
| Shankar Vihar | Magenta Line | 29 May 2018 | Elevated | Side | Only authorized defense personnel and their families are permitted to enter or exit at this station. | |
| Shastri Nagar†† | Red Line | 3 October 2003 | Elevated | Side | Formerly known as Vivekanand Puri. Transfer station for Delhi Sarai Rohilla railway station (Indian Railways) | |
| Shastri Park | Red Line | 24 December 2002 | At-grade | Side | – | |
| Shiv Vihar† | Pink Line | 31 October 2018 | Elevated | Side | – | |
| Shivaji Park | Green Line | 2 April 2010 | Elevated | Side | – | |
| Shivaji Stadium | Airport Express | 23 February 2011 | Underground | Island | – | |
| Shree Ram Mandir Mayur Vihar | Pink Line | 31 December 2018 | Elevated | Side | Formerly known as Mayur Vihar Pocket I | |
| Shyam Park | Red Line | 8 March 2019 | Elevated | Side | – | |
| Sikanderpur* | Yellow Line | 21 June 2010 | Elevated | Side | Transfer to Rapid Metro Gurgaon | |
| Sir M. Vishweshwaraiah Moti Bagh | Pink Line | 6 August 2018 | Elevated | Side | – | |
| South Extension | Pink Line | 6 August 2018 | Underground | Island | – | |
| Subhash Nagar | Blue Line | 30 December 2005 | Elevated | Side | – | |
| Sukhdev Vihar | Magenta Line | 25 December 2017 | Elevated | Side | – | |
| Sultanpur | Yellow Line | 21 June 2010 | Elevated | Side | – | |
| Supreme Court | Blue Line | 11 November 2006 | Elevated | Side | Formerly known as Pragati Maidan The Delhi Metro Museum is stored inside of the station | |
| Tagore Garden | Blue Line | 30 December 2005 | Elevated | Side | – | |
| Terminal 1-IGI Airport | Magenta Line | 29 May 2018 | Underground | Island | Connects to Indira Gandhi International Airport's Terminal 1 | |
| Tikri Border | Green Line | 24 June 2018 | Elevated | Side | – | |
| Tikri Kalan | Green Line | 24 June 2018 | Elevated | Side | – | |
| Tilak Nagar | Blue Line | 30 December 2005 | Elevated | Side | – | |
| Tis Hazari | Red Line | 24 December 2002 | Elevated | Side | – | |
| Trilokpuri - Sanjay Lake | Pink Line | 31 October 2018 | Elevated | Side | Formerly known as Trilokpuri | |
| Tughlakabad Station | Violet Line | 14 January 2011 | Elevated | Side | Formerly known as Tughlakabad | |
| Udyog Nagar | Green Line | 2 April 2010 | Elevated | Side | – | |
| Uttam Nagar East | Blue Line | 30 December 2005 | Elevated | Side | – | |
| Uttam Nagar West | Blue Line | 30 December 2005 | Elevated | Side | – | |
| Uttari Pitampura-Prashant Vihar | Magenta Line | 8 March 2026 | Elevated | Side | – | |
| Vaishali† | Blue Line | 14 July 2011 | Elevated | Side | – | |
| Vasant Vihar | Magenta Line | 29 May 2018 | Underground | Island | – | |
| Vidhan Sabha | Yellow Line | 20 December 2004 | Underground | Side | – | |
| Vinobapuri | Pink Line | 31 December 2018 | Underground | Island | – | |
| Vishwavidyalaya | Yellow Line | 20 December 2004 | Underground | Side | – | |
| Welcome* | Red Line | 24 December 2002 | At-grade | Island | – | |
| Welcome* | Pink Line | 31 October 2018 | Elevated | Side | – | |
| Yamuna Bank* | Blue Line | 10 May 2009 | At-grade | Island | – | |
| Yamuna Bank* | Blue Line | 6 January 2010 | At-grade | Side | – | |
| Yamuna Vihar | Pink Line | 8 March 2026 | Elevated | Side | – | |
| Yashobhoomi Dwarka Sector - 25 | Airport Express | 17 September 2023 | Underground | Side | Formerly known as IICC - Dwarka Sector -25 | |

== See also ==
- List of Ahmedabad Metro stations
- List of Chennai Metro stations
- List of Coimbatore Metro stations
- List of Hyderabad Metro stations
- List of Jaipur Metro stations
- List of Kochi Metro stations
- List of Kolkata Metro stations
- List of Lucknow Metro stations
- List of Madurai Metro stations
- List of Mumbai Metro stations
- List of Noida Metro stations
- List of Nagpur Metro stations
- List of Namma Metro stations
- List of Navi Mumbai Metro Stations
- List of Pune Metro stations
- List of Surat Metro stations
