= Shankar Vihar metro station =

Metro station in Delhi, India

Shankar Vihar

General information
- Location: Shankar Vihar, Delhi Cantt., New Delhi, 110037
- Coordinates: 28°33′39″N 77°08′26″E
- System: Delhi Metro station
- Owner: Delhi Metro
- Operator: Delhi Metro Rail Corporation (DMRC)
- Line: Magenta Line
- Platforms: Side platform Platform-1 → Botanical Garden; Platform-2 → Inderlok
- Tracks: 2

Construction
- Structure type: Elevated, Double-track
- Platform levels: 2
- Accessible: Yes

Other information
- Status: Staffed, Operational
- Station code: SKVR

History
- Opened: 29 May 2018; 8 years ago
- Electrified: 25 kV 50 Hz AC through overhead catenary

Services
Preceding station	Delhi Metro	Following station
Terminal 1-IGI Airport towards Inderlok	Magenta Line	Vasant Vihar towards Botanical Garden
Route map
Location

Shankar Vihar is an elevated metro station on the Magenta Line of the Delhi Metro. Part of the network's Phase III, passenger services at the station commenced on 29 May 2018. As the station is located within a military area of Delhi Cantonment, access to and exit from the station by civilians are restricted. Passengers must possess the requisite permission or identification documents to enter the area.

== History ==
Shankar Vihar station was added to the Delhi Metro's Phase III project in February 2012 following a request from defence authorities to improve connectivity for defence personnel residing in the area. The original Detailed Project Report did not include the station, as the alignment passed through a defence area with unusually long distances between stations. The proposal to construct Shankar Vihar and Sadar Bazar Cantonment stations was approved by the Delhi Metro Rail Corporation (DMRC) in February 2012.

The station was constructed at a cost of ₹31.55 crore (US$3.4 million). According to DMRC, its construction replaced a proposed mid-shaft facility at Shankar Vihar, which had been estimated to cost ₹29.96 crore (US$3.2 million) in the original project report.The station was opened to the public on 29 May 2018 as part of the Janakpuri West–Kalkaji Mandir section of the Magenta Line.

== Station layout ==
=== Structure ===
Shankar Vihar is an elevated station with two side platforms located on separate levels. Platform 1 serves trains towards Botanical Garden, while Platform 2 serves trains towards Janakpuri West. The station has a concourse below the platforms, which houses the fare-control area and provides a passenger crossover.

=== Station layout ===
L2	Side platform | Doors will open on the left
L2	Platform 1 East bound	Towards → Botanical Garden; Next Station: Vasant Vihar
L2	Platform 2 Westbound	Towards ← Inderlok; Next Station: IGI Airport (Terminal 1)
L2	Side platform | Doors will open on the left
L1	Concourse	Fare control, station agent, Metro Card vending machines, crossover
G	Street Level	Exit/Entrance

== Special provision for defence area ==
As the station is located within a restricted defence area of Delhi Cantonment, civilian access is subject to security restrictions. Passengers wishing to enter or exit the station must possess the requisite identification documents or permission to access the area.

== See also ==
- Delhi
- List of Delhi Metro stations
- Transport in Delhi
- Delhi Metro Rail Corporation
- Delhi Suburban Railway
- Delhi Monorail
- Delhi Transport Corporation
- South West Delhi
- Shankar Vihar
- National Capital Region (India)
- List of rapid transit systems
- List of metro systems
