= Hauz Khas metro station =

Metro station in Delhi, India

Hauz Khas

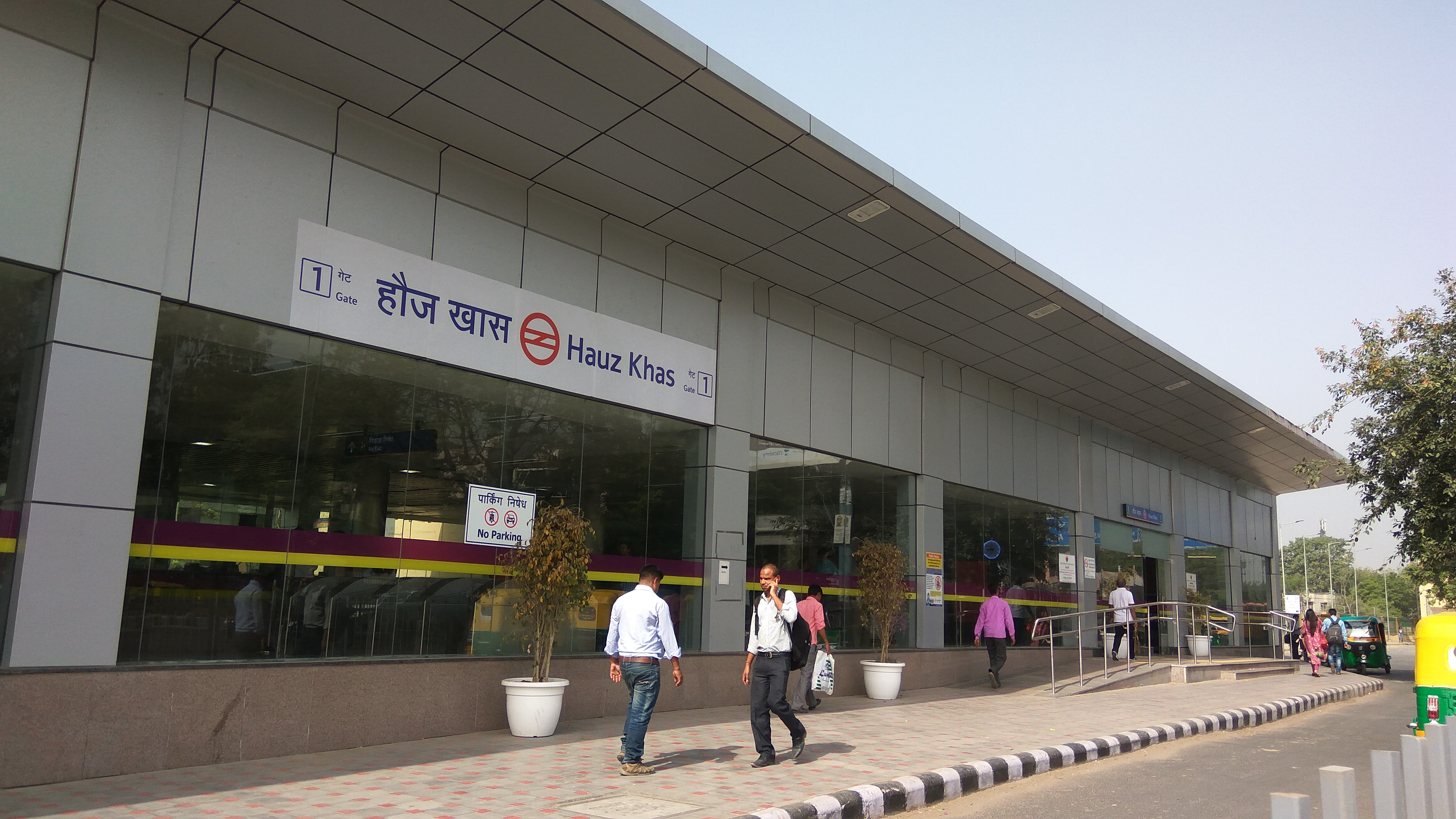

General information
- Location: Jia Sarai, Gamal Abdel Nasser Marg, Block F, Deer Park, Hauz Khas, New Delhi, Delhi 110016
- Coordinates: 28°32′36″N 77°12′23″E
- System: Delhi Metro station
- Owner: Delhi Metro
- Line: Yellow Line Magenta Line
- Platforms: Island platform; Platform-1 → Millennium City Centre Gurugram; Platform-2 → Samaypur Badli; Platform-3 → Botanical Garden; Platform-4 → Inderlok
- Tracks: 4

Construction
- Structure type: Underground
- Depth: 29 m (95 ft)
- Parking: Available
- Accessible: Yes

Other information
- Station code: HKS

History
- Opened: 3 September 2010; 16 years ago (Yellow line); 29 May 2018; 8 years ago (Magenta line)
- Electrified: 25 kV 50 Hz AC through overhead catenary

Services
| Preceding station | Delhi Metro | Following station |
|---|---|---|
| Green Park towards Samaypur Badli | Yellow Line | Malviya Nagar towards Millennium City Centre Gurugram |
| IIT towards Inderlok | Magenta Line | Panchsheel Park towards Botanical Garden |
Route map
Location

Hauz Khas is an underground interchange station on the Yellow Line and Magenta Line of the Delhi Metro, located in South Delhi. It serves nearby residential areas including Hauz Khas Enclave, Sarvapriya Vihar, Vijay Mandal Enclave and Mayfair Gardens, as well as the Indian Institute of Technology Delhi (IIT Delhi). The station is situated along the Outer Ring Road, near the intersection with Sri Aurobindo Marg and Khelgaon Marg.

At a depth of 29 metres (95 ft) below ground level, the Magenta Line station at Hauz Khas is the deepest station in the Delhi Metro network. It has 23 escalators and nine lifts to facilitate passenger movement between its different levels.

== Station layout ==
Station Layout Yellow Line

| G | Street Level | Exit/ Entrance |
| C | Concourse | Fare control, station agent, Ticket/token, shops |
| P | Platform 1 Southbound | Towards → Millennium City Centre Gurugram; Next Station: Malviya Nagar |
| P | Island platform | Doors will open on the right |
| P | Platform 2 Northbound | Towards ← Samaypur Badli; Next Station: Green Park |

Station Layout Magenta Line

| G | Street Level | Exit/ Entrance |
| C | Concourse | Fare control, station agent, Ticket/token, shops |
| P | Platform 3 Eastbound | Towards → Botanical Garden; Next Station: Panchsheel Park |
| P | Island platform | Doors will open on the right |
| P | Platform 4 Westbound | Towards ← Inderlok; Next Station: IIT |

=== Facilities ===
The station has the following facilities:

- Token Vending Machine: One token vending machine near the frisking point
- Toilet: 2 toilets- Both on the unpaid concourse
- Shop/Office: Cashify, SBI Card, SIDBI, Pulse, two Food Track IRCTCs, SBI Card and WH Smith on the paid concourse
- Medical/Health: Two first aid rooms on the paid concourse
- Water: Pi-lo water ATM on the paid concourse
- Travel: Yulu Bikes (electric bikes) at gate number 1's circulating area and Uber (cab facilities) at gate number 1's exit
- Food/Restaurant: Munch with AVA near the Magenta Line station control room

== Entry/Exits ==
Hauz Khas station entry/exits
| Gate No-1 | Gate No-2 | Gate No-3 | Gate No-4 |
|---|---|---|---|
| Outer Ring Road Towards IIT Delhi | Laxman Public School | Shri Krishna Chaitanya Mahaprabhu Marg | Kalu Sarai |

== Connections ==
=== Bus ===
- DTC buses: DTC bus routes numbers 335, 344, 448, 448B, 448CL, 465, 503, 511, 511A, 512, 520, 542, 548, 548CL, 548EXT, 620, 764, 764EXT, 765, 774 and 774B serve the station from nearby Sarvpriya Vihar bus stop.
- Delhi Metro feeder buses:
  - Feeder bus service ML-72 starts from Hauz Khas metro station and ends at Chhatarpur metro station. It passes through the following bus stops: Vasant Kunj, Vasant Vihar Depot, Vasant Vihar, Munirka, Katwaria Sarai, Qutub Hotel, Adhchini and Hauz Khas.
  - Feeder bus service ML-73 starts from Hauz Khas metro station and ends at Badarpur Border metro station. It passes through the following bus stops: Panchsheel, Savitri Nagar, Swami Nagar, Chirag Delhi, Savitri Cinema, Chitranjanpark, DDA Flat, Tara Apartments, Sangam Vihar, Prahladpur and Badarpur.
  - Feeder bus service ML-80 starts from Hauz Khas metro station and ends at Okhla Dam. It passes through the following bus stops: Green Park, AIIMS metro station, South Ext., Lajpat Nagar, Ashram, Okhla Mor/Iswar Nagar, Holly Family and Jamia Millia Islamia.
  - Feeder bus service ML-87 starts from Nehru Place metro station and ends at Malai Mandir. It passes through the following bus stops: Savitri Cinema Mor, Masjid Mor, Chirag Delhi, Hauz khas Metro Station, Jia Sarai and Munirka.

== See also ==
- Hauz Khas
- South Delhi
- Delhi
- List of Delhi Metro stations
- Transport in Delhi
- Delhi Metro Rail Corporation
- Delhi Suburban Railway
- Delhi Monorail
- Delhi Transport Corporation
- National Capital Region (India)
- List of rapid transit systems
- List of metro systems
