= Shankar Vihar =

- Neighborhood of Delhi
- Location in Delhi, India
- Coordinates: 28°33′57″N 77°8′23″E
- Country: India
- State: Delhi

Languages
  - Official: Hindi
- Time zone: UTC+5:30 (IST)

Shankar Vihar is a residential complex for serving personnel of the Indian Armed Forces and their families, provided by the Government of India in New Delhi. Currently there are more than 278 houses including Permanent & Temporary. It is surrounded by an airbase, open fields and scrub forests. It is located in Delhi Cantonment.

Shankar Vihar houses a shopping complex. There is an Army Public School.

The area is well maintained and has scenic viewpoints as well as manicured parks, gymnasiums, swimming pools and restaurants.

== Transport ==
It is connected to the Deli metro with a station, the Shankar Vihar metro station.
