= Kalindi Kunj metro station =

Metro station in Delhi, India

Kalindi Kunj

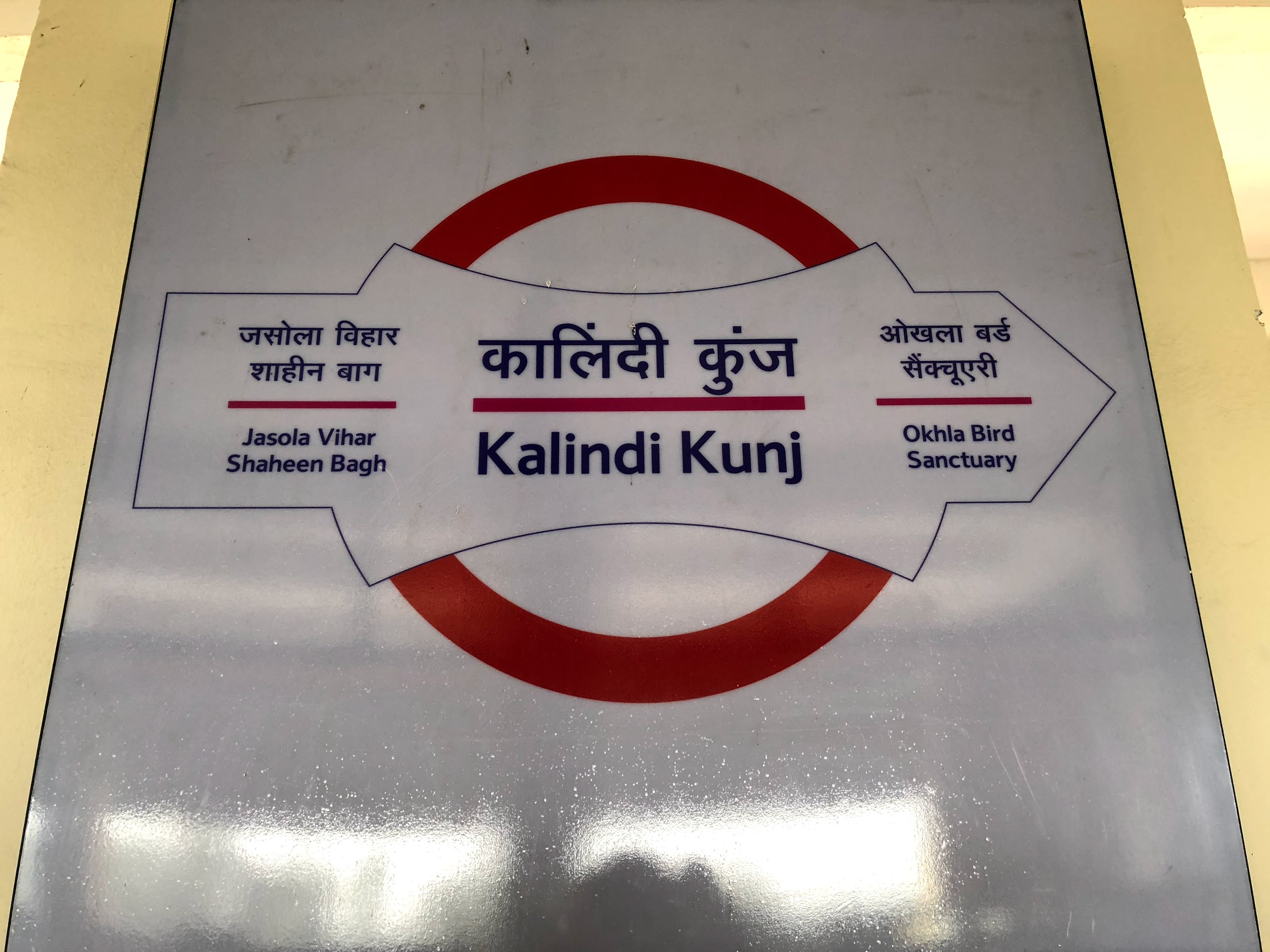

General information
- Location: Madanpur Khadar, Kalindi Kunj, New Delhi, Delhi 110076
- Coordinates: 28°32′34″N 77°18′37″E
- System: Delhi Metro station
- Owner: Delhi Metro
- Operator: Delhi Metro Rail Corporation (DMRC)
- Line: Magenta Line Golden Line
- Platforms: Side platform Platform-1 → Botanical Garden; Platform-2 → Inderlok
- Tracks: 2

Construction
- Structure type: Elevated
- Platform levels: 2
- Parking: No
- Accessible: Yes

Other information
- Station code: KIKJ
- Fare zone: NCT

History
- Opened: 25 December 2017; 8 years ago
- Electrified: 25 kV 50 Hz AC through overhead catenary

Services
Preceding station	Delhi Metro	Following station
Jasola Vihar Shaheen Bagh towards Inderlok	Magenta Line	Okhla Bird Sanctuary towards Botanical Garden
Future service
Madanpur Khadar towards Terminal 1 IGI Airport or Lajpat Nagar	Golden Line	Terminus
Route map
Location

The Kalindi Kunj metro station is located near Toll booth (Kalindi Kunj Border) and is located on the Magenta Line of the Delhi Metro.

Kalindi Kunj is part of Phase III of Delhi Metro, on the Magenta Line.

== The station ==
=== Structure ===
Kalindi Kunj elevated metro station situated on the Magenta Line of Delhi Metro.

=== Station layout ===
L2	Side platform | Doors will open on the left
L2	Platform 1 East bound	Towards → Botanical Garden; Next Station: Okhla Bird Sanctuary (Delhi-U.P border)
L2	Platform 2 Westbound	Towards ← Inderlok; Next Station: Jasola Vihar Shaheen Bagh
L2	Side platform | Doors will open on the left
L1	Concourse	Fare control, station agent, Metro Card vending machines, crossover
G	Street Level	Exit/Entrance

=== Facilities ===
List of available ATM at Kalindi Kunj metro station are,

== Connections ==
=== Bus ===
Delhi Transport Corporation bus routes number 8, 8A, 34, 34A, 443, 493, serves the station.

== Entry/Exit ==
Kalindi Kunj metro station Entry/exits
Gate No-1	Gate No-2	Gate No-3	Gate No-4
Jaitpur /Khadda Colony Delhi	Meethapur/Molarband Delhi	NTPC ECO park Badarpur New Delhi	Toll plaza (Kalindi Kunj border)

== See also ==
- List of Delhi Metro stations
- Transport in Delhi
- Delhi Metro Rail Corporation
- Delhi Suburban Railway
- Delhi Transport Corporation
- Uttar Pradesh
- Noida
- Okhla Sanctuary
- Okhla barrage
- Kalindi Kunj
- National Capital Region (India)
- List of rapid transit systems
- List of metro systems
