= Okhla Bird Sanctuary metro station =

Metro station in Delhi, India

Okhla Bird Sanctuary

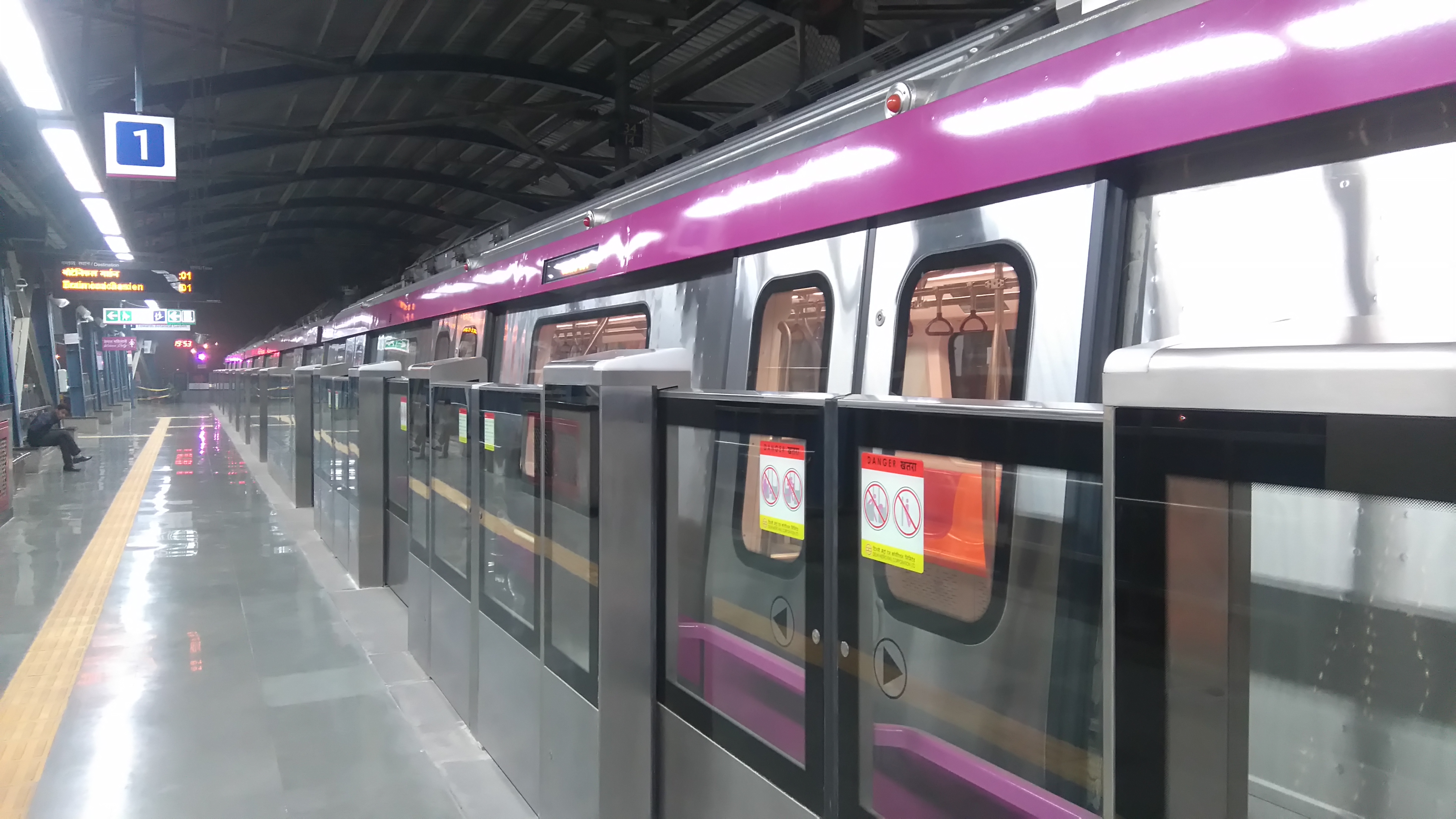
- Fleet of Magenta line in station

General information
- Location: Amrapali Marg, Sector 94, Noida, Uttar Pradesh 201313
- Coordinates: 28°33′10″N 77°19′18″E
- System: Delhi Metro station
- Owner: Delhi Metro
- Operator: Delhi Metro Rail Corporation (DMRC)
- Line: Magenta Line
- Platforms: Side platform Platform-1 → Botanical Garden; Platform-2 → Inderlok
- Tracks: 2

Construction
- Structure type: Elevated
- Platform levels: 2
- Parking: Available
- Accessible: Yes

Other information
- Station code: OKBS

History
- Opened: 25 December 2017; 8 years ago
- Electrified: 25 kV 50 Hz AC through overhead catenary

Services
Preceding station	Delhi Metro	Following station
Kalindi Kunj towards Inderlok	Magenta Line	Botanical Garden Terminus
Route map
Location

The Okhla Bird Sanctuary metro station is located on the Magenta Line of the Delhi Metro. It is located in the Okhla Bird Sanctuary, Sector 94, Noida, Uttar Pradesh, India. which is one of the 466 IBAs (Important Bird Areas) of India.

== Station ==
=== Location ===
The Okhla Bird Sanctuary metro station is situated in Noida, Uttar Pradesh. It is bounded by the Yamuna river on one side (across from Kalindi Kunj) and the Noida-Greater Noida Expressway on the other side. It is very close to the Okhla Bird Sanctuary.

=== Station layout ===
L2	Side platform | Doors will open on the left
L2	Platform 1 East bound	Towards → Botanical Garden Change at the next station for Blue Line
L2	Platform 2 Westbound	Towards ← Inderlok; Next Station: Kalindi Kunj
L2	Side platform | Doors will open on the left
L1	Concourse	Fare control, station agent, Metro Card vending machines, crossover
G	Street Level	Exit/Entrance

=== Facilities ===
The station has the following facilities:

- Toilet: On the unpaid concourse
- Food / Restaurant: Grub Hub on the ground floor (facing the Supernova Spira)

== Connections ==
=== Bus ===
DTC bus routes number 8, 8A, 34, 34A, 443 and 493 serve the station.

== Entry/Exit ==
Okhla Bird Sanctuary metro station Entry/exits
Gate No-1	Gate No-2	Gate No-3
Okhla Bird Sanctuary	Supernova Spira	Mahamaya flyover

== See also ==
- Delhi
- List of Delhi Metro stations
- Transport in Delhi
- Delhi Metro Rail Corporation
- Delhi Suburban Railway
- Delhi Monorail
- Delhi Transport Corporation
- Uttar Pradesh
- Noida
- Okhla Sanctuary
- Okhla barrage
- National Capital Region (India)
- List of rapid transit systems
- List of metro systems
