= Magenta Line (Delhi Metro) =

Line on the Delhi Metro system

Magenta Line (Line 8)
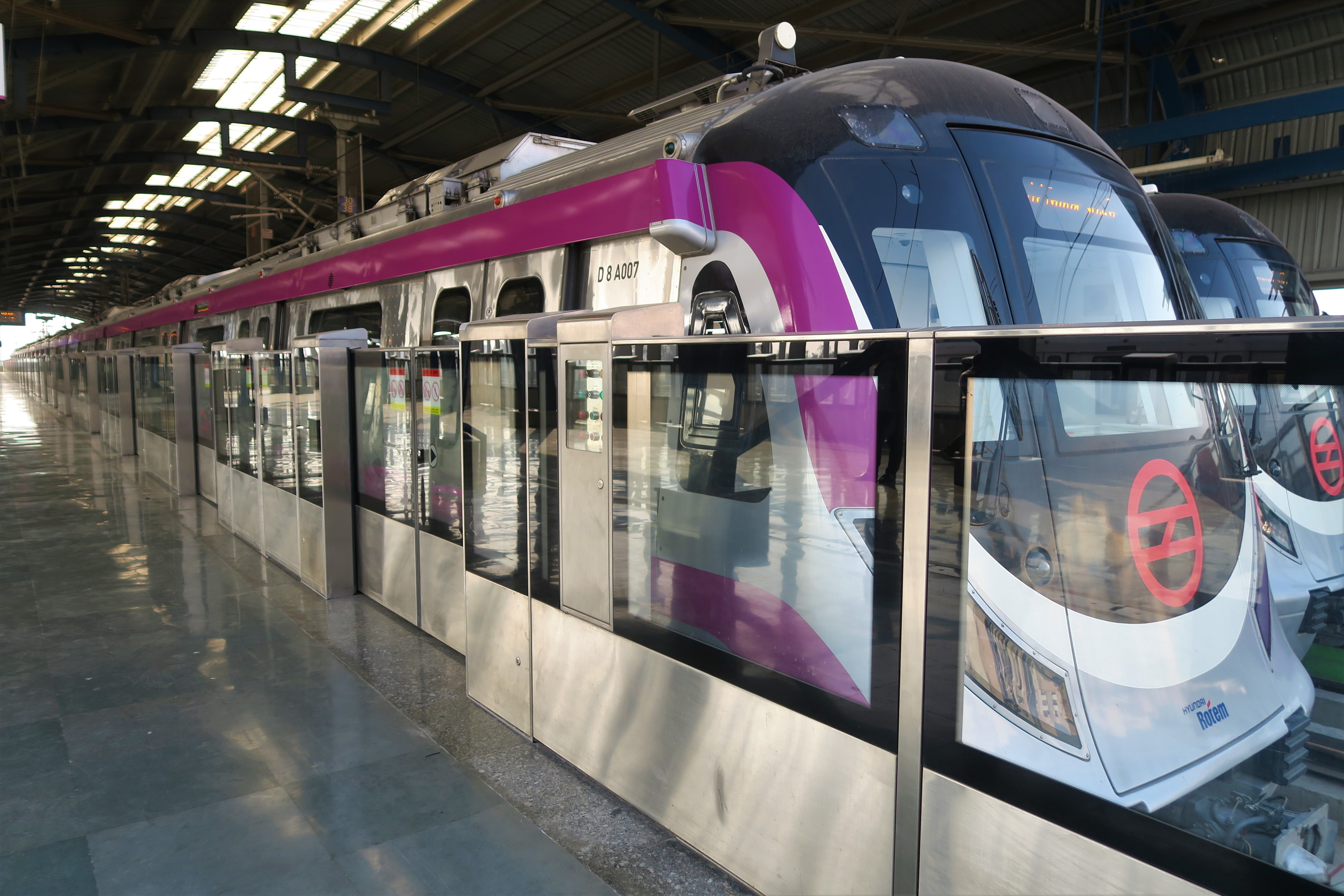
- Hyundai Rotem train of Magenta Line

Overview
- Status: Operational
- Owner: Delhi Metro
- Locale: Delhi and Noida
- Termini: Krishna Park Extension, Majlis Park, Botanical Garden, Deepali Chowk
- Stations: 33

Service
- Type: Rapid transit
- System: Delhi Metro
- Operator: Delhi Metro Rail Corporation
- Rolling stock: Hyundai Rotem and Alstom Metropolis

History
- Opened: 25 December 2017; 8 years ago
- Last extension: 8 March 2026

Technical
- Line length: 50.18 kilometers (31.18 mi)
- Num of tracks: 2
- Character: Underground and Elevated
- Track gauge: 1,435 mm (4 ft 8 1/2 in) standard gauge
- Electrification: 25 kV 50 Hz AC from overhead catenary

The Magenta Line (Line 8) is a metro rail line of the Delhi Metro, a rapid transit system in Delhi, India and the first driverless metro in India. The line, which runs across North, West and South Delhi and is mostly underground, spans 50.18 kilometers (31.18 mi) and consists of 33 metro stations: 17 are elevated and the rest are underground. Unlike the Airport Metro Express, this line directly serves Terminal 1 of the Indira Gandhi International Airport. Currently trains on this line run on two separate sections, i.e., Majlis Park - Deepali Chowk and Krishna Park Extension - Janakpuri West - Botanical Garden. Initially there was no direct service on the latter section but as of April 2026 every second train terminates at Krishna Park Extension.

The Janakpuri West metro station on the line contains India's tallest escalator with a vertical height of 15.6 meters (51 ft). The highest point on the Delhi Metro network is near the Haiderpur Badli Mor Metro station, where the line reaches a record-breaking height of 28.362 metres at Pier No. 340. This location surpasses the previous record of 23.6 meters at Dhaula Kuan on the Pink Line. The Magenta Line has interchanges with the Yellow Line at Hauz Khas and Haiderpur Badli Mor, with the Blue Line at Janakpuri West and Botanical Garden, and with the Violet Line at Kalkaji Mandir, and with the Pink Line at Majlis Park of the Delhi Metro network.

Shankar Vihar metro station is unique within the network as it is the only station where civilian movement is restricted by the military. Located within the Delhi Cantonment, it primarily serves defence personnel due to its position in the heart of the defence zone. The Hauz Khas metro station on this line is the deepest metro station in the network at a depth of 29 meters (95 ft).

For the first time in India, the construction of two parallel tunnels was successfully completed concurrently at the Dabri Mor–Janakpuri South station.

== History ==
=== Summary of phased extensions ===
As of April 2026, on the entire approved "Botanical Garden – Krishna Park Extension and Deepali Chowk – Majlis Park – Indraprastha - Inderlok" route, 50.72 km out of total 89.73 km route and 33 stations out of total 57 stations are operational, with 39.01 km route and 24 stations under-construction.

Magenta Line
| Status | Sections | Length | Stations |
| Completed (25 December 2017) | Phase-3: Botanical Garden – Kalkaji Mandir | 12.64 kilometers (7.854 mi) | 9 |
| Completed (28 May 2018) | Phase-3: Kalkaji Mandir – Janakpuri West | 24.82 kilometers (15.422 mi) | 16 |
| Completed (5 January 2025) | Phase-4: Janakpuri West – Krishna Park Extension | 2.8 kilometers (1.740 mi) | 1 |
| Under-construction (Late-2026 expected) | Phase-4: Krishna Park Extension – Deepali Chowk | 16.6 kilometers (10.315 mi) | 6 |
| Completed (8 March 2026) | Phase-4: Deepali Chowk – Majlis Park | 9.92 kilometers (6.164 mi) | 7 |
| Under-construction (Late-2027 expected) | Phase-4: Majlis Park – RK Ashram Marg | 13.5 kilometers (8.389 mi) | 8 |
| Under-construction (Late-2030 expected) | Phase-5A: RK Ashram Marg – Indraprastha | 9.91 kilometers (6.158 mi) | 9 |
| Under-construction (Late-2030 expected) | Phase-4: Indraprastha - Inderlok | 12.38 kilometers (7.69 mi) | 8 |
| Total | Botanical Garden – Janakpuri West - Krishna Park Extension - Deepali Chowk - Majlis Park - Nabi Karim - RK Ashram Marg - Indraprastha - Nabi Karim - Inderlok | 89.73 kilometers (55.756 mi) | 64 |

=== Phase 3 ===
Phase-3 Magenta line was initially scheduled for completion in December 2016, but the timeline was extended due to challenging tunnelling conditions. Trial runs began in August 2017. The line was inaugurated in two phases: the first section, from Botanical Garden to Kalkaji Mandir, was opened to the public on 25 December 2017. The second phase was inaugurated on 28 May 2018, with the remaining section becoming operational and open for public use on 29 May 2018 at 06:00 IST.

A stretch of 8.679 km (5.393 mi), comprising 9 stations on the Botanical Garden–Kalkaji Mandir section, was opened to the public on 25 December 2017. The portion of 24.82 km (15.422 mi) of the line was opened to public on 28 May 2018 and a small stretch of 2.8 km (1.740 mi) the section of Phase IV was opened on 5 January 2025.

The stretch of 9.92 km (6.16 mi) comprising seven stations from Deepali Chowk to Majlis Park of Phase IV was opened on 8 March 2026.

=== Phase 4 ===
Under this phase, the line will be further extended from Janakpuri West to Ramakrishna Ashram Marg, providing interchanges with the Green, Red, Yellow, Pink and Blue lines and improving connectivity in the northern parts of Delhi. For this, the existing depot of the Pink Line at Mukundpur has been upgraded to service Magenta Line trains also. The extension is expected to be fully completed by December 2027. A small section between Janakpuri West and Krishna Park Extension has been operational since 5 January 2025.

Trial runs commenced in November 2025 on the section between Majlis Park and Deepali Chowk stations using the new Alstom Metropolis trains. Three stations along this stretch were renamed: Pitampura to Madhuban Chowk, Prashant Vihar to Uttari Pitampura–Prashant Vihar, and North Pitampura to Haiderpur Village. This section was opened to the public on 8 March 2026.

It was decided that the Inderlok–Indraprastha corridor, originally planned as an extension of the Green Line under Phase IV, would instead be implemented as an extension of the Magenta Line. This will increase the total length of the Magenta Line, from Botanical Garden to Inderlok, to approximately 89 km, making it the longest metro line in Delhi.

Consequently, the line will have an interchange with itself at Nabi Karim, and the proposed plan for a new station building at Inderlok was shelved in favour of an underground station. The foundation stone for this stretch was laid by Prime Minister Narendra Modi on 8 March 2026.

This section is expected to open only after the RK Ashram Marg–Indraprastha section becomes operational, despite having been planned earlier. Construction on this section had commenced by July 2026.

=== Phase 5A ===
A 9.913 kilometres (6.160 mi) extension under Phase 5A was approved by the Union Cabinet at a cost of ₹9,570.4 crore (US$1.0 billion). This new corridor, which would be completely underground, will begin from Ramakrishna Ashram Marg on the Blue Line–Magenta Line interchange and have the following stations: Shivaji Stadium, Yuge Yugeen Bharat, Central Secretariat, CCS Building, India Gate, War Memorial–High Court, Baroda House, Bharat Mandapam, and will end at Indraprastha on the Blue Line–Magenta Line interchange. Construction on this section has commenced as of July 2026.

== Stations ==
Magenta Line
| # | Station Name | | Phase | Opening | Interchange connections | Station layout | Platform layout |
| # | English | Hindi | Phase | Opening | Interchange connections | Station layout | Platform layout |
| 1 | Inderlok | इन्द्रलोक | IV | 2030 | Red Line; Green Line | Underground | Island |
| 2 | Daya Basti | दया बस्ती | IV | 2030 | Dayabasti | Underground | Island |
| 3 | Sarai Rohilla | सराय रोहिल्ला | IV | 2030 | Delhi Sarai Rohilla | Underground | Island |
| 4 | Ajmal Khan Park | अजमल खां पार्क | IV | 2030 | None | Underground | Island |
| 5 | Jhandewalan Mandir | झण्डेवालान मन्दिर | IV | 2030 | None | Underground | Island |
| 6 | Nabi Karim | नबी करीम | IV | 2030 | Magenta Line (Phase 4 - Under Construction) | Underground | Island |
| 7 | New Delhi | नई दिल्ली | IV | 2030 | Yellow Line; Airport Express; New Delhi | Underground | Island |
| 8 | Delhi Gate | दिल्ली गेट | IV | 2030 | Violet Line | Underground | Island |
| 9 | Delhi Sachivalaya–I.G. Stadium | दिल्ली सचिवालय - आई.जी. स्टेडियम | IV | 2030 | None | Underground | Island |
| 10 | Indraprastha | इन्द्रप्रस्थ | IV | 2030 | Blue Line | Underground | - |
| 11 | Bharat Mandapam | भारत मण्डपम | V(A) | 2030 | None | Underground | - |
| 12 | Baroda House | बड़ौदा हाउस | V(A) | 2030 | None | Underground | - |
| 13 | War Memorial–High Court | वार मेमोरियल–हाईकोर्ट | V(A) | 2030 | None | Underground | - |
| 14 | India Gate | इण्डिया गेट | V(A) | 2030 | None | Underground | - |
| 15 | CCS Building | सीसीएस बिल्डिंग | V(A) | 2030 | None | Underground | - |
| 16 | Central Secretariat | केन्द्रीय सचिवालय | V(A) | 2030 | Violet Line; Yellow Line | Underground | - |
| 17 | Yuge Yugeen Bharat | युगे युगीन भारत | V(A) | 2030 | None | Underground | - |
| 18 | Shivaji Stadium | शिवाजी स्टेडियम | V(A) | 2030 | Airport Express | Underground | - |
| 19 | Ramakrishna Ashram Marg | रामकृष्ण आश्रम मार्ग | IV | 2027 | Blue Line | Underground | Island |
| 20 | Nabi Karim | नबी करीम | IV | 2027 | Magenta Line (Phase 4 - Under Construction) | Underground | Island |
| 21 | Sadar Bazar | सदर बाज़ार | IV | 2027 | None | Underground | Island |
| 22 | Pulbangash | पुलबंगश | IV | 2027 | Red Line | Underground | Island |
| 23 | Ghanta Ghar | घण्टा घर | IV | 2027 | None | Underground | Island |
| 24 | Nanak Piao–Derawal Nagar | नानक प्याऊ–डेरावाल नगर | IV | 2027 | None | Underground | Island |
| 25 | Ashok Vihar | अशोक विहार | IV | 2027 | None | Elevated | Side |
| 26 | Azadpur | आज़ादपुर | IV | 2027 | Pink Line; Yellow Line | Elevated | Side |
| 27 | Majlis Park | मजलिस पार्क | IV | 8 March 2026 | Pink Line | Elevated | Island |
| 28 | Bhalaswa | भलस्वा | IV | 8 March 2026 | None | Elevated | Side |
| 29 | Haiderpur Badli Mor | हैदरपुर बादली मोड़ | IV | 8 March 2026 | Yellow Line | Elevated | Island |
| 30 | Haiderpur Village | हैदरपुर गांव | IV | 8 March 2026 | None | Elevated | Side |
| 31 | Uttari Pitampura-Prashant Vihar | उत्तरी पीतमपुरा - प्रशांत विहार | IV | 8 March 2026 | None | Elevated | Side |
| 32 | Madhuban Chowk | मधुबन चौक | IV | 8 March 2026 | Red Line (Interchange not operational) | Elevated | Side |
| 33 | Deepali Chowk | दीपाली चौक | IV | 8 March 2026 | None | Elevated | Side |
| 34 | Pushpanjali | पुष्पांजली | IV | December 2026 | None | Elevated | Side |
| 35 | Mangolpur Kalan–West Enclave | मंगोलपुर कलां-वेस्ट एन्क्लेव | IV | December 2026 | None | Elevated | Side |
| 36 | Mangolpuri | मंगोलपुरी | IV | December 2026 | None | Elevated | Side |
| 37 | Peeragarhi | पीरागढ़ी | IV | December 2026 | Green Line | Elevated | Side |
| 38 | Paschim Vihar | पश्चिम विहार | IV | December 2026 | None | Elevated | Side |
| 39 | Keshopur | केशोपुर | IV | December 2026 | None | Elevated | Side |
| 40 | Krishna Park Extension | कृष्णा पार्क एक्सटेंशन | IV | 5 January 2025 | None | Underground | Island |
| 41 | Janakpuri West | जनकपुरी पश्चिम | III | 29 May 2018 | Blue Line | Underground | Island |
| 42 | Dabri Mor - Janakpuri South | डाबरी मोड़–जनकपुरी साउथ | III | 29 May 2018 | None | Underground | Island |
| 43 | Dashrathpuri | दशरथपुरी | III | 29 May 2018 | None | Underground | Island |
| 44 | Palam | पालम | III | 29 May 2018 | None | Underground | Island |
| 45 | Sadar Bazar Cantonment | सदर बाज़ार छावनी | III | 29 May 2018 | None | Elevated | Side |
| 46 | Terminal 1-IGI Airport | टर्मिनल 1 - आईजीआई एयरपोर्ट | III | 29 May 2018 | IGI Airport (T-1); Golden Line (Phase 5A - Approved) | Underground | Island |
| 47 | Shankar Vihar | शंकर विहार | III | 29 May 2018 | None | Elevated | Side |
| 48 | Vasant Vihar | वसन्त विहार | III | 29 May 2018 | None | Underground | Island |
| 49 | Munirka | मुनिरका | III | 29 May 2018 | None | Underground | Island |
| 50 | R. K. Puram | आर के पुरम | III | 29 May 2018 | None | Underground | Island |
| 51 | IIT | आईआईटी | III | 29 May 2018 | None | Underground | Island |
| 52 | Hauz Khas | हौज़ ख़ास | III | 29 May 2018 | Yellow Line | Underground | Island |
| 53 | Panchsheel Park | पंचशील पार्क | III | 29 May 2018 | None | Underground | Island |
| 54 | Chirag Delhi | चिराग दिल्ली | III | 29 May 2018 | Golden Line (Branch Line) (Phase 4 - Approved) | Underground | Island |
| 55 | Greater Kailash | ग्रेटर कैलाश | III | 29 May 2018 | None | Underground | Island |
| 56 | Nehru Enclave | नेहरू एन्क्लेव | III | 29 May 2018 | None | Underground | Island |
| 57 | Kalkaji Mandir | कालकाजी मंदिर | III | 25 December 2017 | Violet Line | Underground | Side |
| 58 | Okhla NSIC | ओखला एनएसआईसी | III | 25 December 2017 | None | Elevated | Side |
| 59 | Sukhdev Vihar | सुखदेव विहार | III | 25 December 2017 | None | Elevated | Side |
| 60 | Jamia Millia Islamia | जामिया मिल्लिया इस्लामिया | III | 25 December 2017 | None | Elevated | Side |
| 61 | Okhla Vihar | ओखला विहार | III | 25 December 2017 | None | Elevated | Side |
| 62 | Jasola Vihar Shaheen Bagh | जसोला विहार शाहीन बाग़ | III | 25 December 2017 | None | Elevated | Side |
| 63 | Kalindi Kunj | कालिन्दी कुंज | III | 25 December 2017 | Golden Line (Phase 5A - Approved) | Elevated | Side |
| 64 | Okhla Bird Sanctuary | ओखला बर्ड सैंक्चुअरी | III | 25 December 2017 | None | Elevated | Side |
| 65 | Botanical Garden | बॉटेनिकल गार्डन | III | 25 December 2017 | Blue Line | Elevated | Side |

== Train info ==
Magenta Line
| Rakes | Hyundai Rotem | Alstom Metropolis |
| Train Length | 6 | |
| Train Gauge | 1,435 mm (4 ft 8 1/2 in) standard gauge | |
| Electrification | 25 kV 50 Hz AC (nominal) from overhead catenary | |
| Train's Maximum Speed | 100 km/h | |
| Train Operation | Botanical Garden ⇄ Janakpuri West Botanical Garden ⇄ Krishna Park Extension Deepali Chowk ⇄ Majlis Park | |

The newer Metropolis trains operate on the Deepali Chowk section from the Mukundpur Depot. A single modified Hyundai Rotem train, with its first and last coaches closed to passenger access, previously operated as a shuttle service on the Krishna Park Extension section. Currently, every alternate train from Botanical Garden continues to Krishna Park Extension, which operates as a single-line section due to the absence of a crossover.

== See also ==
- Delhi
- List of Delhi Metro stations
- Delhi Metro
- Delhi Monorail
- Delhi Suburban Railway
- Transport in Delhi
- Urban rail transit in India
- List of metro systems
