= Krishna Park Extension metro station =

Metro station in Delhi, India

Krishna Park Extension

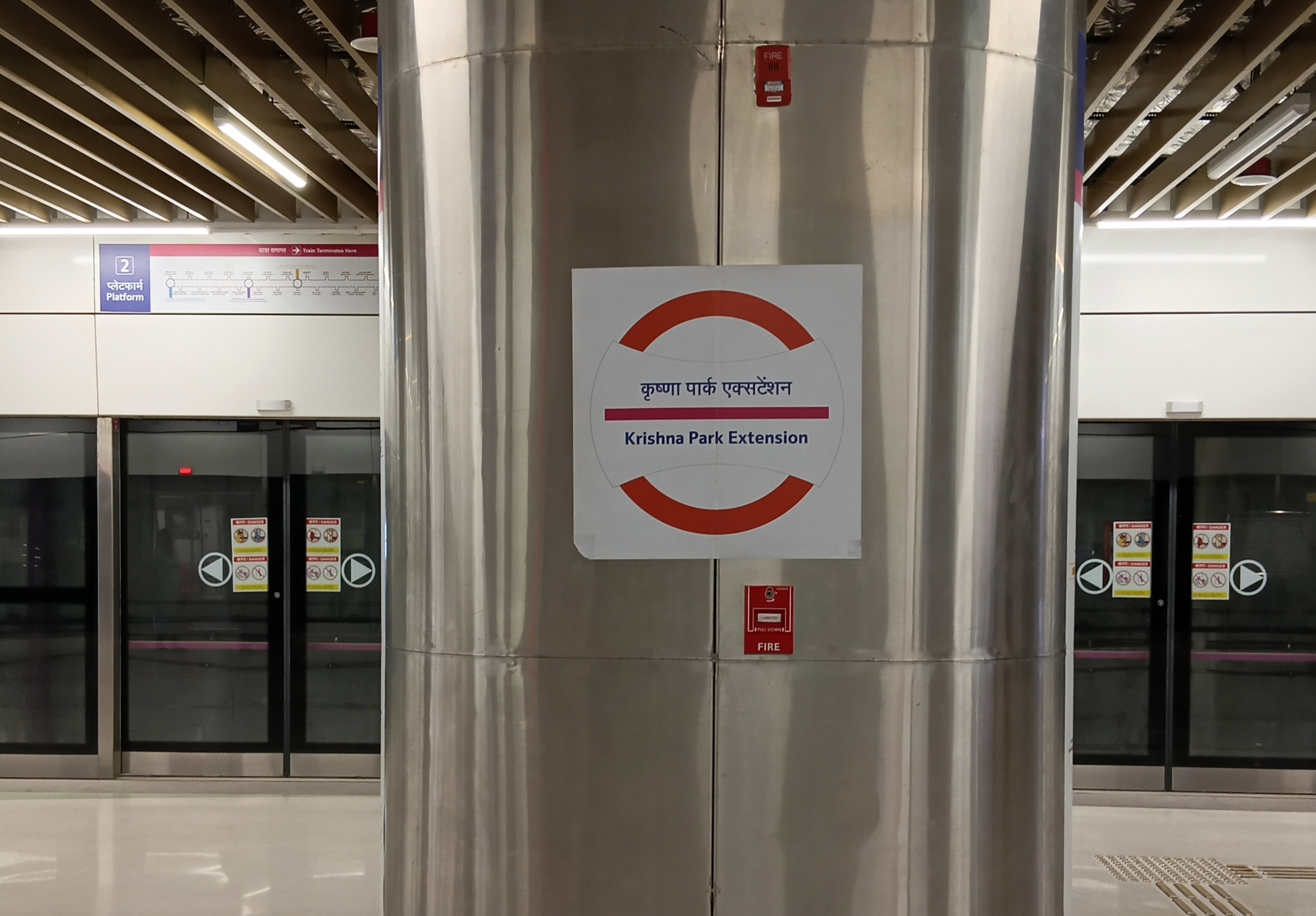

General information
- Location: Outer Ring Rd, Krishna Park Extension, New Delhi, Delhi, 110018
- System: Delhi Metro station
- Owner: Delhi Metro
- Operator: Delhi Metro Rail Corporation (DMRC)
- Line: Magenta Line
- Platforms: Island platform Platform-1 → Botanical Garden; Platform-2 → Train Terminates Here
- Tracks: 2

Construction
- Structure type: Underground
- Platform levels: 2
- Parking: Multi-Level Parking in Metro's Unity One Mall
- Accessible: Yes

Other information
- Station code: KPEN

History
- Opened: 5 January 2025; 22 months ago
- Electrified: 25 kV 50 Hz AC through overhead catenary

Passengers
- Jan 2025: 21,262/day 659,120/ Month average

Services
Preceding station	Delhi Metro	Following station
Terminus	Magenta Line	Janakpuri West towards Botanical Garden
Future service
Keshopur towards Inderlok	Magenta Line (extension by 2026)	Janakpuri West towards Botanical Garden
Route map
Location

Krishna Park Extension is an underground metro station on the Magenta Line of the Delhi Metro, located in West Delhi. It forms part of Phase IV of the Delhi Metro expansion and commenced passenger operations on 5 January 2025 as the first operational section of Phase IV. The station serves the surrounding areas of Krishna Park, Vikaspuri and Janakpuri.

== About the station ==
Krishna Park Extension station was initially scheduled to open in August 2024. However, its opening was delayed, and passenger services eventually commenced on 5 January 2025. Initially, a single train operated as a shuttle between Janakpuri West and Krishna Park Extension because the section lacked reversal facilities. The train's first and last coaches were closed to passengers and reserved for staff. This temporary arrangement was subsequently discontinued in 2026, with through-running services introduced between Krishna Park Extension and the existing Magenta Line.

== Station Layout ==
G	Street level	Exit/Entrance
C	Concourse	Fare control, station agent, Ticket/token, shops
P	Platform 1 Eastbound	Towards → Botanical Garden; Next Station: Janakpuri West; Change at the next station for Blue Line
P	Island platform | Doors will open on the right
P	Platform 2 Westbound	Towards ← No Service; To Be extended to Inderlok; Next Station: Keshopur
