= Botanical Garden metro station =

Metro station in Noida, Delhi, India

Botanical Garden

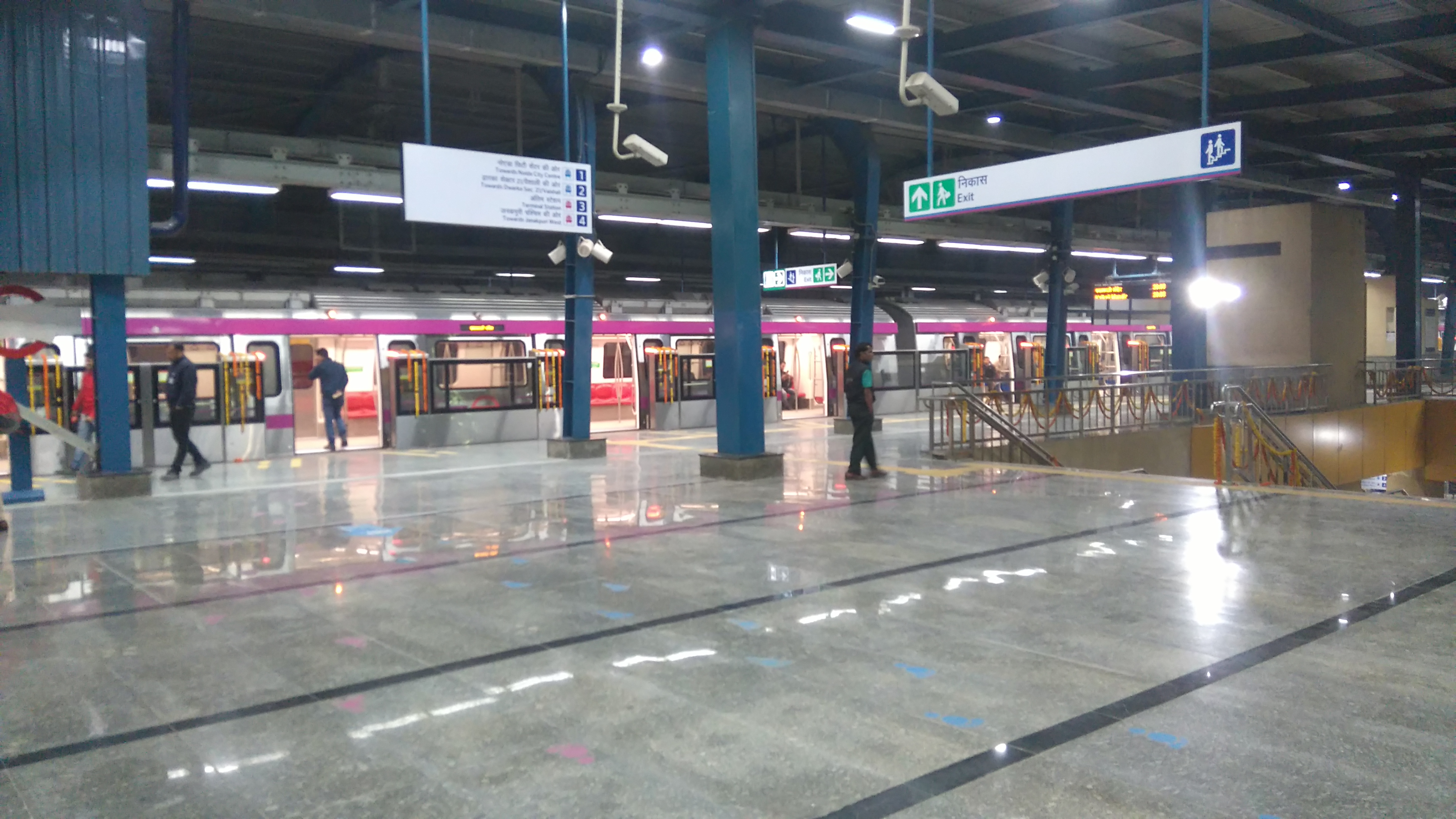
- Train of the Magenta line in Station

General information
- Location: Sector 38, Noida, Uttar Pradesh
- Coordinates: 28°33′51″N 77°20′05″E
- System: Delhi Metro station
- Owner: Delhi Metro
- Operator: Delhi Metro Rail Corporation (DMRC)
- Line: Blue Line Magenta Line
- Platforms: Side platform; Platform-1 → Noida Electronic City; Platform-2 → Dwarka Sector 21; Platform-3 → Train terminates; Platform-4 → Inderlok
- Tracks: 4

Construction
- Structure type: Elevated
- Platform levels: 2
- Parking: Available
- Accessible: Yes

Other information
- Station code: BCGN

History
- Opened: 12 November 2009; 17 years ago (Blue Line); 25 December 2017; 8 years ago (Magenta Line)
- Electrified: 25 kV 50 Hz AC through overhead catenary

Services
Preceding station	Delhi Metro	Following station
Noida Sector 18 towards Dwarka Sector 21	Blue Line	Golf Course towards Noida Electronic City
Okhla Bird Sanctuary towards Inderlok	Magenta Line	Terminus
Route map
Location

Botanical Garden is an elevated interchange metro station in Sector 38, Noida, Uttar Pradesh, connecting the Blue Line and Magenta Line of the Delhi Metro. It serves as the eastern terminus of the operational Botanical Garden–Krishna Park Extension section of the Magenta Line.

On 3 May 2024, the station was recognised as the "Best Metro Station" by the Delhi Metro Rail Corporation (DMRC). The award was announced during the corporation's 30th Foundation Day celebrations at Bharat Mandapam in New Delhi. It was selected from among 288 stations in the Delhi Metro network.

== The station ==
=== Structure ===
Botanical Garden is an elevated interchange station on the Blue Line and Magenta Line of the Delhi Metro. It is the first elevated interchange station of the Delhi Metro located outside the boundaries of Delhi, in Noida, Uttar Pradesh.

=== Station layout ===
L2	Side platform | Doors will open on the left
L2	Platform 3 Eastbound	Towards → Train Terminates Here
L2	Platform 4 Westbound	Towards ← Krishna Park Extension; Next Station: Okhla Bird Sanctuary
L2	Side platform | Doors will open on the left
L2	cross-platform interchange
L2	Platform 2 Westbound	Towards → Dwarka Sector 21; Next Station: Noida Sector 18
L2	Platform 1 Eastbound	Towards ← Noida Electronic City; Next Station: Golf Course
L2	Side platform | Doors will open on the left
L1	Concourse	Fare control, station agent, metro card vending machines, crossover
G	Street level	Exit/Entrance

== Connections ==
=== Bus ===
Delhi Transport Corporation bus routes 33, 33A, 33EXT, 34, 34A, 319, 319A, 323, 347, 347A, 443, 443A and 491 serve the station.

The Yamuna Expressway Industrial Development Authority (YEIDA) introduced the Yamuna Sarthi bus service in 2015 to connect Noida and Greater Noida with areas along the Yamuna Expressway. The service initially operated CNG-powered semi-low-floor buses, each with a capacity of 50 passengers, between Botanical Garden Metro station and Sector 22D in the YEIDA area. The original circular route covered 13 stops: Botanical Garden Metro station, The Great India Place Mall, Amity University, ATS Village in Sector 93A, KPMG, Kondli, Pari Chowk, Parsvnath P3, the YEIDA office, Gautam Buddha University, Galgotias University, Dankaur and Sector 22D.

In January 2024, YEIDA, in collaboration with the Uttar Pradesh State Road Transport Corporation (UPSRTC), introduced bus services on two routes connecting its areas with Botanical Garden Metro station, including a route between Sector 22D and Botanical Garden.

== Entry/Exit ==
Botanical Garden metro station entry/exits
Gate No-1	Gate No-2	Gate No-3	Gate No-4
ENTRY	ENTRY	EXIT	ENTRY
Captain Vijayant Thapar Marg	Captain Vijayant Thapar Marg	Captain Vijayant Thapar Marg	Multilevel Car Parking

== Gallery ==
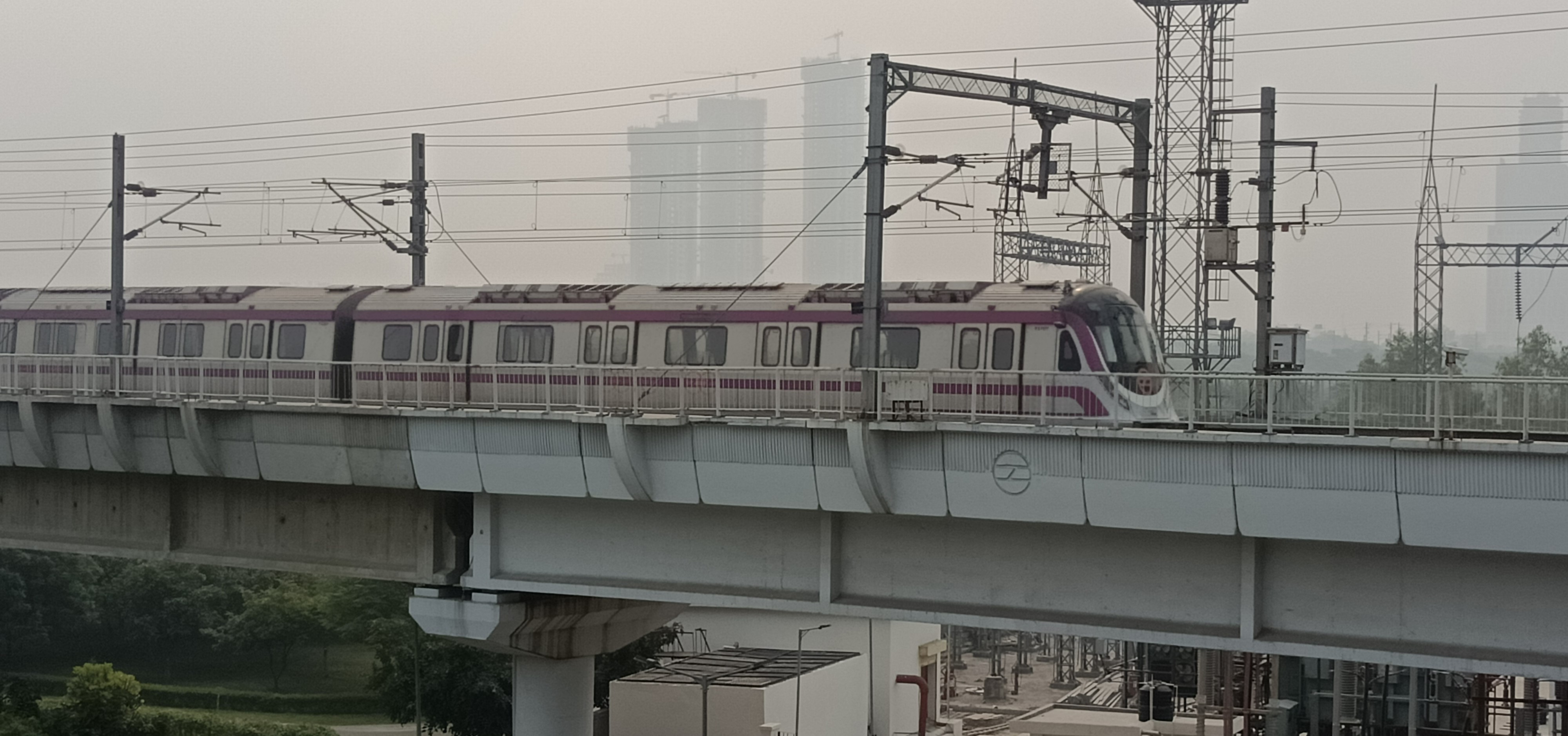
A Hyundai Rotem train at the Botanical Garden metro station

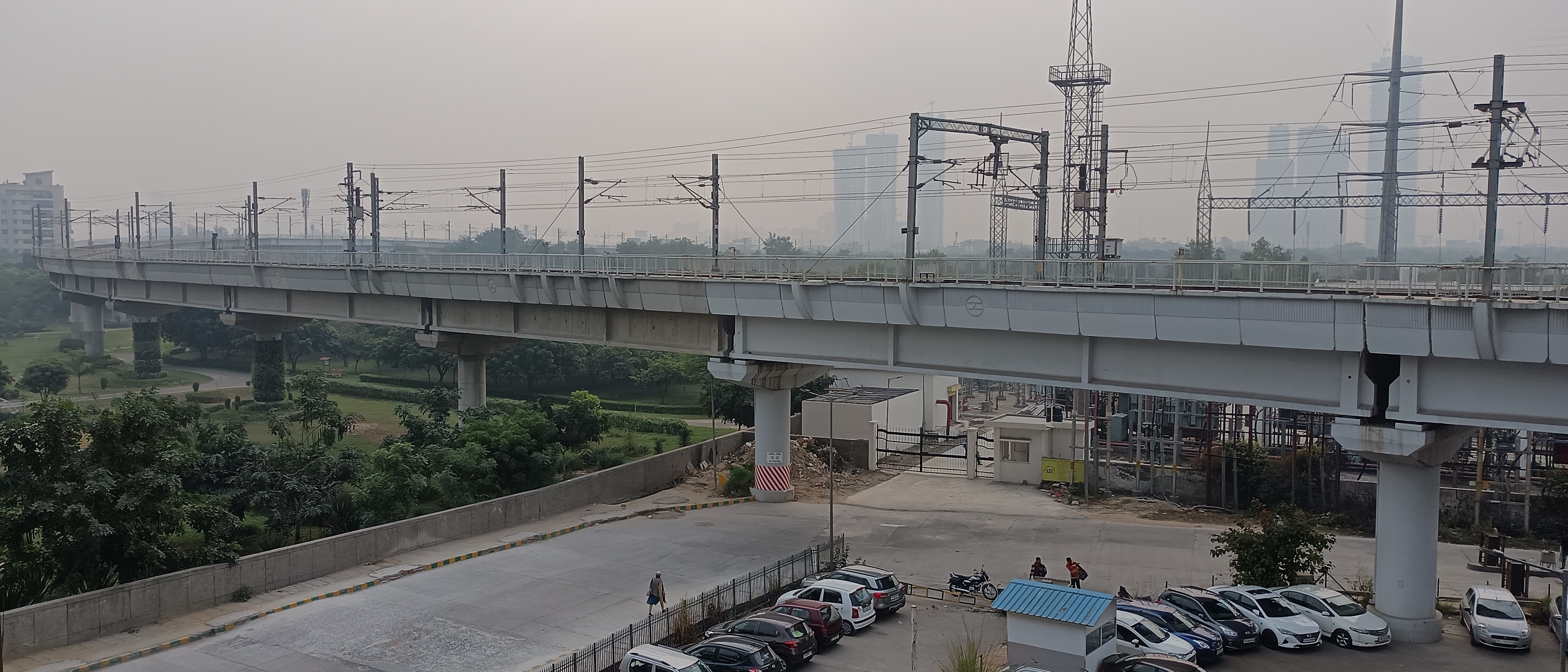
Viaduct - The Magenta Line at the Botanical Garden metro station

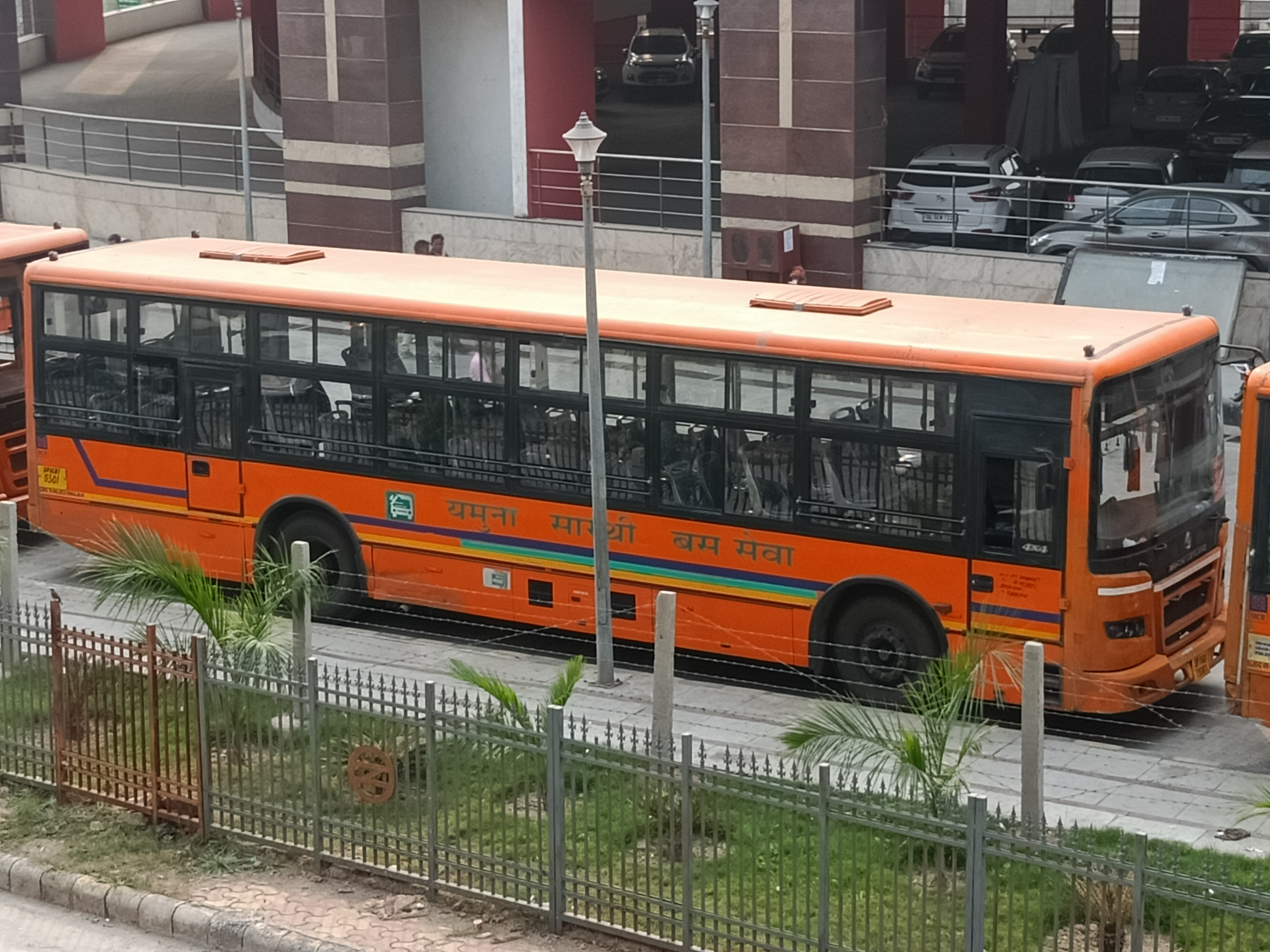
A bus of the Yamuna Sarthi Bus Seva at the Botanical Garden metro station

== See also ==
- Delhi
- List of Delhi Metro stations
- Transport in Delhi
- Delhi Metro Rail Corporation
- Delhi Suburban Railway
- Delhi Monorail
- Delhi Transport Corporation
- Uttar Pradesh
- Noida
- National Capital Region (India)
- List of rapid transit systems
- List of metro systems
