= Malviya Nagar metro station =

Metro station in Delhi, India

Malviya Nagar

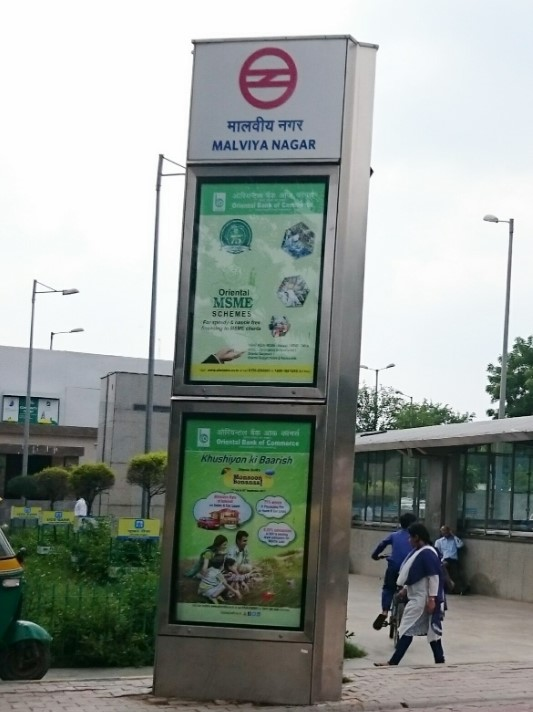

General information
- Location: Press Enclave Marg, Malviya Nagar, New Delhi, 110017; India
- Coordinates: 28°31′43″N 77°12′12″E
- System: Delhi Metro station
- Owner: Delhi Metro
- Operator: Delhi Metro Rail Corporation (DMRC)
- Line: Yellow Line
- Platforms: Island platform; Platform-1 → Millennium City Centre Gurugram; Platform-2 → Samaypur Badli
- Tracks: 2

Construction
- Structure type: Underground, Double-track
- Platform levels: 2
- Parking: Available
- Accessible: Yes

Other information
- Status: Staffed, Operational
- Station code: MVNR

History
- Opened: 3 September 2010; 15 years ago
- Electrified: 25 kV 50 Hz AC through overhead catenary

Services
Preceding station	Delhi Metro	Following station
Hauz Khas towards Samaypur Badli	Yellow Line	Saket towards Millennium City Centre Gurugram
Route map
Location

The Malviya Nagar metro station is located on the Yellow Line of the Delhi Metro.

It is located near the PVR Cinemas multiplex, just north of Saket's A block. It is nearer to Geetanjali Enclave than to Malviya Nagar.

== Station layout ==
G	Street Level	Exit/ Entrance
C	Concourse	Fare control, station agent, Ticket/token, shops
P	Platform 1 Southbound	Towards → Millennium City Centre Gurugram; Next Station: Saket
P	Island platform | Doors will open on the right
P	Platform 2 Northbound	Towards ← Samaypur Badli; Next Station: Hauz Khas Change at the next station for Magenta Line

== Exits ==
There is an exit at Geetanjali Enclave which opens inside the colony of the same name. The other is the Malviya Nagar exit.

Malviya Nagar station Entry/exits
Gate No-1	Gate No-2

== Connections ==
=== Bus ===
Delhi Transport Corporation bus routes number 0OMS (+), 448, 448A, 448CL, 493, 500, 512, 522A, 534, 534A, 548, 548CL, 548EXT, 680, AC-534, OMS (+), OMS (+) AC, serves the station from nearby A Block Saket bus stop.

== See also ==
- New Delhi
- Malviya Nagar (Delhi)
- List of Delhi Metro stations
- Transport in Delhi
- Delhi Metro Rail Corporation
- Delhi Suburban Railway
- Delhi Transport Corporation
- South Delhi
- National Capital Region (India)
- List of rapid transit systems
- List of metro systems
