= MG Road metro station (Gurgaon) =

Metro station in Delhi, India

MG Road

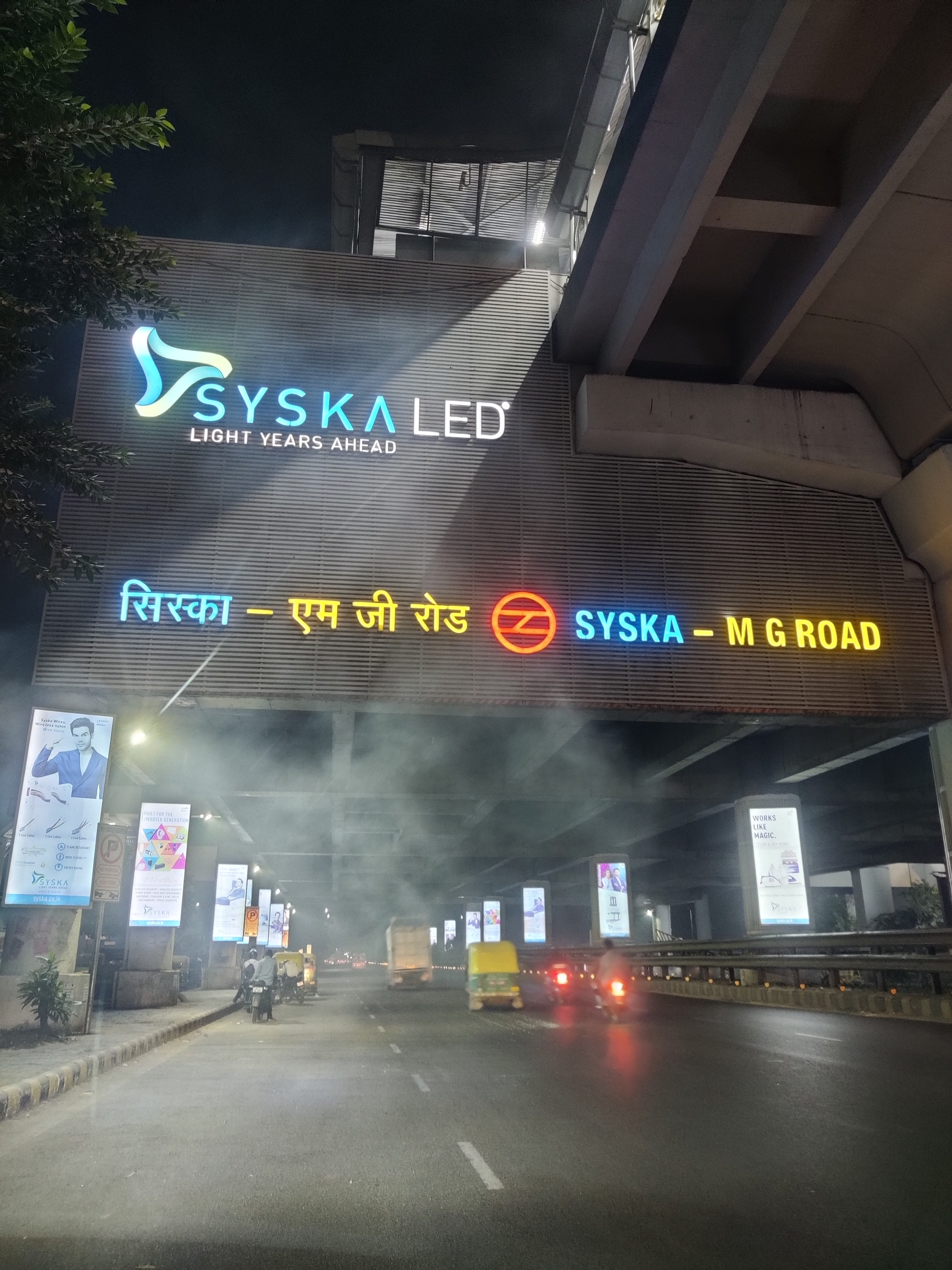

General information
- Location: Sector 25, Maruti Housing Colony, Sector 28, Gurugram, Haryana 122022; India
- Coordinates: 28°28′46″N 77°04′48″E
- System: Delhi Metro station
- Owner: Delhi Metro
- Operator: Delhi Metro Rail Corporation (DMRC)
- Line: Yellow Line
- Platforms: Side platform; Platform-1 → Millennium City Centre Gurugram; Platform-2 → Samaypur Badli
- Tracks: 2

Construction
- Structure type: Elevated, Double-track
- Platform levels: 2
- Parking: Available
- Accessible: Yes

Other information
- Status: Staffed, Operational
- Station code: MGRO

History
- Opened: 21 June 2010; 16 years ago
- Electrified: 25 kV 50 Hz AC through overhead catenary

Passengers
- Jan 2015: 33,792/day 1,047,556/ Month average

Services
Preceding station	Delhi Metro	Following station
Sikanderpur towards Samaypur Badli	Yellow Line	IFFCO Chowk towards Millennium City Centre Gurugram
Route map
Location

The MG Road is a Delhi Metro station located in Gurgaon, Haryana. The station lies on the Yellow Line of the Delhi Metro.

The station has two malls – DLF City Centre and MGF Metropolitan – on either side of it. It is also in the vicinity of residential complexes such as Beverley Park, Essel Towers and Heritage City.

== History ==
=== Station layout ===
L2	Side platform | Doors will open on the left
L2	Platform 1 Southbound	Towards → Millennium City Centre Gurugram; Next Station: IFFCO Chowk
L2	Platform 2 Northbound	Towards ← Samaypur Badli; Next Station: Sikanderpur Change at the next station for Rapid Metro Gurgaon
L2	Side platform | Doors will open on the left
L1	Concourse	Fare control, station agent, Metro Card vending machines, crossover
G	Street Level	Exit/Entrance

=== Facilities ===
List of available ATM at MG Road metro station are HDFC Bank, Yes Bank, State Bank of India, IndusInd Bank

== Entry/Exit ==
MG Road metro station Entry/exits
Gate No-1	Gate No-2

== Connections ==
=== Bus ===
Delhi Transport Corporation bus routes Badarpur Border - Gurugram Bus Stand, Ballabgarh Bus Stand - Rohtak ISBT, Gurugram Bus Stand - Badarpur Road, MG Road metro station - Green Field Colony Gate No 4/2, OLA152, OLA153, State Bank - Huda Office / Kendriya Vihar serves the station from outside metro station stop.

== See also ==
- Haryana
- Gurgaon
- List of Delhi Metro stations
- Transport in Delhi
- Delhi Metro Rail Corporation
- Delhi Suburban Railway
- Delhi Monorail
- Delhi Transport Corporation
- South East Delhi
- New Delhi
- National Capital Region (India)
- List of rapid transit systems
- List of metro systems
