= Saket (Delhi) =

- District Subdivision
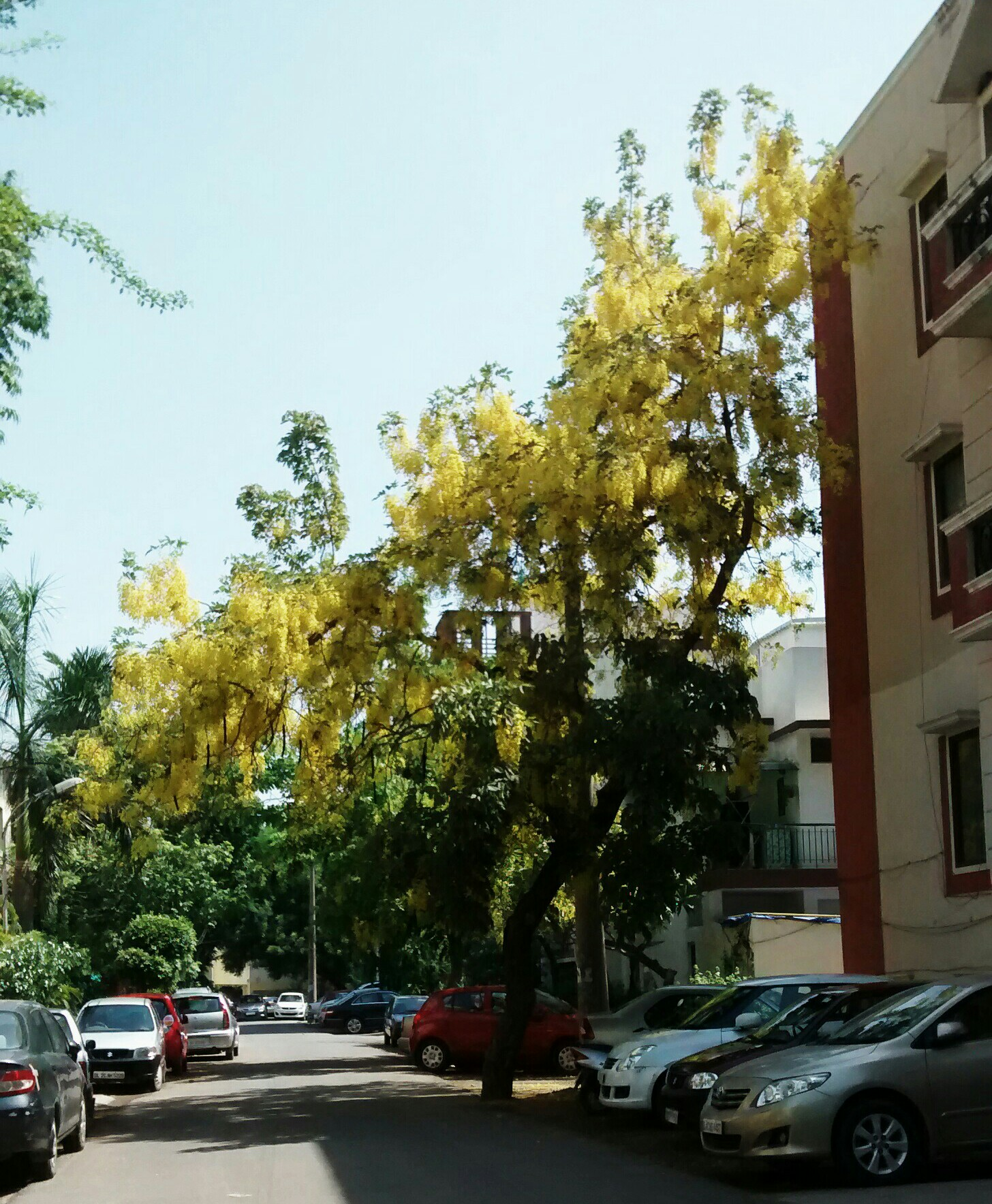
- Road in Saket A Block.

- Location in Delhi, India
- Coordinates: 28.5192°N 77.2134°E
- Country: India
- State: Delhi
- District: South Delhi

Languages
  - Official: Hindi, English
- Time zone: UTC+5:30 (IST)

Saket is a residential colony and the administrative headquarters of the South Delhi district of Delhi in India.

The local district headquarters are also situated on M.B. Road, Saket. The DDA developed the Saket Sports Complex spread over 18.5 acres, in 1990.

Saket was developed on the lands of the Chauhan village of Khirki, the Rajput-Jat village of Said‑ul‑Ajaib, and the Hauz Rani village.

== Residential blocks ==
Saket is primarily a residential area which consists of a Press Enclave and residential blocks named by alphabets from A to N. These blocks constitute a mixture of row houses, multi-story apartments, and two-story apartments. There are several parks associated with these residential blocks as well.

== Oldest surviving dam ==
Muhammad Shah Tughlaq constructed Satpula as a water harvesting dam in the newly built Jahanpanah city. Satpula, a Tughlaq-era marvel, According to historians, Satpula ('sat' means seven and 'pull' means openings of a bridge) features a bridge with seven main openings and two subsidiary openings at each end, serving both defensive and irrigation purposes. Built during Sultan Muhammad Shah Tughlaq's reign (1325-1351), Satpula was an integral part of the fourth city of Delhi. Despite its historical significance, Satpula is now in a state of disrepair, with deteriorated walls, damaged plaster, and graffiti, no longer serving its original dam function.

== Points of interest ==
=== Entertainment ===
Saket is home to the PVR Cinemas Anupam-4 Multiplex Theatre, which was the first multiplex in India. The place was originally called Anupam and was owned by the Ansals Group, a group that also ran the Gyan Bharti School and shared a common boundary with the Anupam complex. The Ansals Group eventually leased the cinema hall to the PVR Venture Group (Joint venture between Mr. Ajay Bijli and PVR of Australia). The nearby Select Citywalk mall also houses the PVR Premier, a newer 6-screen multiplex and the adjacent DLF Avenue house shops and restaurants.

Close by at Saidul Ajaib, is the Garden of Five Senses developed by DTTDC.

=== Schools ===
There are several schools in and near Saket:

- Apeejay School, Saket
- Amity International School
- Gyan Bharati School
- Birla Vidya Niketan
- New Green Fields Public School
- Red Roses Public School
- Delhi Public School International (DPS International)
- Amrita Vidyalayam
- Vidya Niketan Senior Secondary School
- Kendriya Vidyalaya, Pushp Vihar, New Delhi
- Several government schools
- Apeejay Gng School Primary

==== Colleges ====
There are several colleges near Saket:

- Delhi Institute of Pharmaceutical Sciences and Research (Pushp Vihar)
- Shaheed Bhagat Singh College (Sheikh Sarai)
- Sri Aurobindo College (Shivalik, Malviya Nagar)
- Vocational College (Shaikh Sarai)

=== Court ===
District Court of South and South East District is located at Saket, New Delhi at Press Enclave Road near Pushp Vihar.

=== Medical facilities ===
There are three hospitals in Saket, all of which are privately run:

- Max Super Specialty Hospital (with 557 beds)
- Max smart super Speciality Hospital (250-bed)
- Pushpawati Singhania Hospital & Research Institute
- Sawan Neelu Angel's Nursing Home
- Chikitsa Hospital

=== Sports and culture ===
==== Saket Sports Complex ====
The Saket Sports Complex was developed by the DDA in 1990. It is spread over 18.5 acres in the area between Gyan Bharti School, Max Hospital, G.D. Modi Hospital and Mandir Marg. The sports complex offers various facilities for playing cricket, tennis, badminton, squash, and table tennis, and a gymnasium, a jogging track, and a swimming pool.

==== Shopping Centre ====
Saket is considered to be Delhi's one of the best locations for shopping with Malls.

- Select Citywalk, Centre Saket
- MGF Metropolitan Mall Saket
- Square One Mall Saket

== Location ==
Saket shares its border with Mehrauli (where Qutub Minar, the largest brick minaret in the world, is situated) on the west, Pushp Vihar on the east, Malviya Nagar & Gitanjali Enclave on the North and Sainik Farms on the south side.

Saket lies on the Yellow Line of Delhi Metro. There are 2 metro stations in Saket, Malviya Nagar station on the Press Enclave Road and Saket station on Mehrauli-Badarpur Road. Both these stations are underground. Saket is the last underground station on the yellow line from Huda City Center towards Rajiv Chowk.

One can also reach Saket on any of the following buses: 427, 493, 500, 501, 512, 522A, 532, 534, 448, 448A, 548, 681 at the Bahri Mudrika (Outer Ring Road). There are many auto rickshaw and taxi stands here as well.
