= Arjan Garh metro station =

Metro station in Delhi, India

Arjan Garh

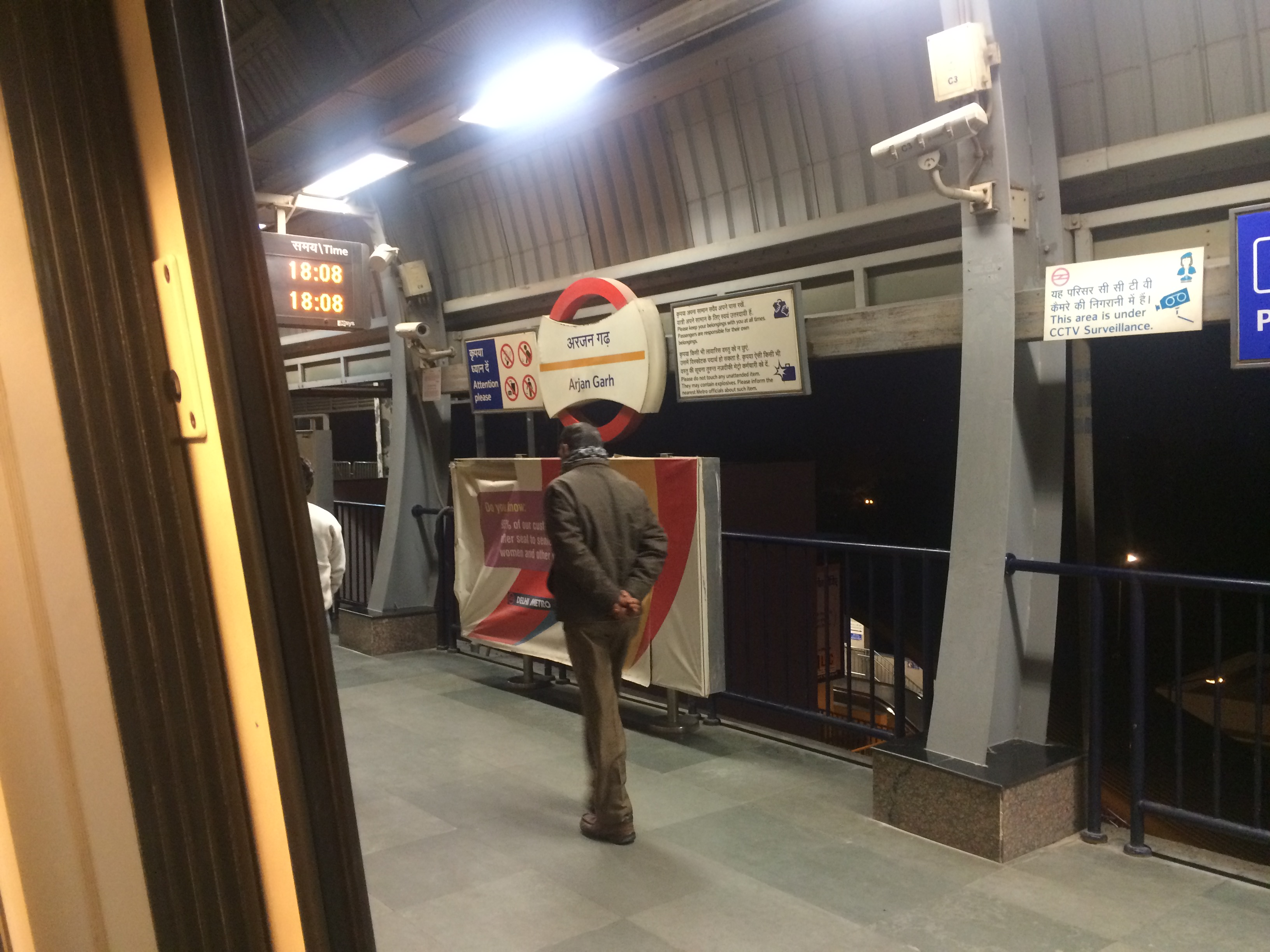

General information
- Location: Aya Nagar, South Delhi, Delhi - 110047; India
- Coordinates: 28°28′51″N 77°07′33″E
- System: Delhi Metro station
- Owner: Delhi Metro
- Operator: Delhi Metro Rail Corporation (DMRC)
- Line: Yellow Line
- Platforms: Side platform; Platform-1 → Millennium City Centre Gurugram; Platform-2 → Samaypur Badli
- Tracks: 2

Construction
- Structure type: Elevated, Double-track
- Platform levels: 2
- Parking: Available
- Accessible: Yes

Other information
- Status: Staffed, Operational
- Station code: AJG

History
- Opened: 21 June 2010; 16 years ago
- Electrified: 25 kV 50 Hz AC through overhead catenary

Passengers
- January 2015: 9,897/day 306,797/month (average)

Services
Preceding station	Delhi Metro	Following station
Ghitorni towards Samaypur Badli	Yellow Line	Guru Dronacharya towards Millennium City Centre Gurugram
Route map
Location

Arjan Garh is an elevated metro station on the Yellow Line of the Delhi Metro, located in Aya Nagar, South Delhi. It is the last station on the line within Delhi before it enters Gurugram, Haryana. The station was originally planned to be constructed inside the Arjan Garh Air Force station. However, following objections from the Air Force authorities and considering the lack of residential development around the proposed location, the alignment was shifted to Aya Nagar, while the station retained its original name. In May 2010, local residents began a campaign demanding that the station be renamed Aya Nagar or Aya Nagar–Arjan Garh, arguing that its existing name did not reflect its actual location.

In response to an RTI query in May 2010, the Delhi Metro Rail Corporation (DMRC) initially estimated that changing the name of a metro station would cost approximately ₹248,000 (US$2,600). However, minutes of a meeting held on 3 December 2010 recorded that the estimated cost of renaming Arjan Garh station would be around ₹5 crore (US$530,000), considering that 52 trains were operating on the line. DMRC subsequently explained that the earlier estimate had been provided when the station was not operational and that the cost had increased after its commissioning.

The residents subsequently approached the Delhi High Court through a public interest litigation titled Ved Pal v. Govt. of NCT of Delhi & Anr. (W.P. (C) 7982/2015). On 17 September 2015, the court dismissed the petition, observing that the naming or renaming of a metro station was an administrative decision. Relying on the Supreme Court's judgment in Tata Cellular v. Union of India, it observed that courts could examine the legality, rationality and procedural propriety of administrative decisions, but could not substitute their own judgment for that of the administrative authority merely because another decision might appear preferable. The court held that naming the station after the Arjan Garh Air Force Base could not be considered grossly arbitrary or irrational.

== Station layout ==
L2	Side platform | Doors will open on the left
L2	Platform 1 Southbound	Towards → Millennium City Centre Gurugram; Next Station: Guru Dronacharya
L2	Platform 2 Northbound	Towards ← Samaypur Badli; Next Station: Ghitorni
L2	Side platform | Doors will open on the left
L1	Concourse	Fare control, station agent, metro card vending machines, crossover
G	Street Level	Gates

== Facilities ==
The station has the following facilities:

- Token and automatic vending machines: Multiple machines on the unpaid concourse
- Toilets: 2 toilets – one on the unpaid concourse and another on the ground level

== Entry/Exits ==
Arjan Garh metro station: Gates
Gate No-1	Gate No-2
Mehrauli-Gurugram Road: Aya Nagar	Mehrauli-Gurugram Road: Indian Metrological Department (IMD)

== Connections ==
=== Bus ===
DTC bus route numbers 334, 428, 517, 525, D202 and Badarpur border - Gurugram bus stand serve the station from the Aya Nagar X-ing bus stop.

== See also ==
- Mehrauli
- List of Delhi Metro stations
- Transport in Delhi
- Delhi Metro Rail Corporation
- Delhi Suburban Railway
- Delhi Monorail
- Delhi Transport Corporation
- South East Delhi
- New Delhi
- National Capital Region (India)
- List of rapid transit systems
- List of metro systems
