= Ghitorni metro station =

Metro station in Delhi, India

Ghitorni

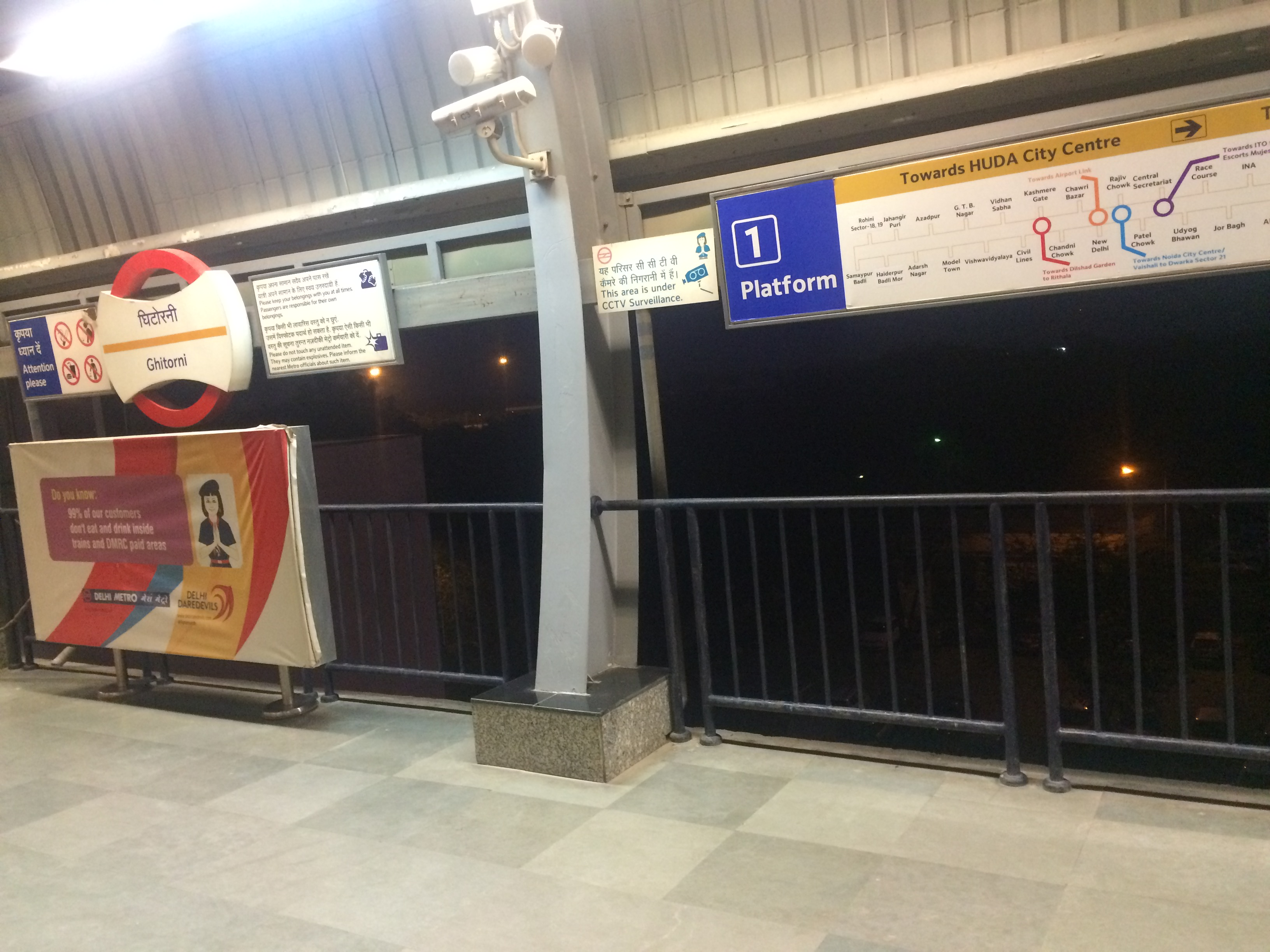

General information
- Location: DLF Farms, Gadaipur, Opposite. Ghitorni Village, Delhi, 110030; India
- Coordinates: 28°29′38″N 77°08′57″E
- System: Delhi Metro station
- Owner: Delhi Metro
- Operator: Delhi Metro Rail Corporation (DMRC)
- Line: Yellow Line
- Platforms: Side platform; Platform-1 → Millennium City Centre Gurugram; Platform-2 → Samaypur Badli
- Tracks: 2

Construction
- Structure type: Elevated, Double-track
- Platform levels: 2
- Parking: Available
- Accessible: Yes

Other information
- Status: Staffed, Operational
- Station code: GTNI

History
- Opened: 21 June 2010; 16 years ago
- Electrified: 25 kV 50 Hz AC through overhead catenary

Passengers
- Jan 2015: 5,388/day 167,023/ Month average

Services
Preceding station	Delhi Metro	Following station
Sultanpur towards Samaypur Badli	Yellow Line	Arjan Garh towards Millennium City Centre Gurugram
Route map
Location

Ghitorni is an elevated metro station on the Yellow Line of the Delhi Metro, located between Sultanpur and Arjan Garh stations in South Delhi.

== Station Layout ==
L2	Side platform | Doors will open on the left
L2	Platform 1 Southbound	Towards → Millennium City Centre Gurugram; Next Station: Arjan Garh
L2	Platform 2 Northbound	Towards ← Samaypur Badli; Next Station: Sultanpur
L2	Side platform | Doors will open on the left
L1	Concourse	Fare control, station agent, Metro Card vending machines, crossover
G	Street Level	Exit/Entrance

== Entry/Exit ==
Ghitorni metro station Entry/exits
Gate No-1&2
NBCC Office
DMRP
Parking
SSB Camp
The Icon Farm House
Ghitorni Village

== Connections ==
=== Bus ===
Delhi Transport Corporation bus routes number 517, Badarpur Border - Gurugram Bus Stand, Gurgaon Bus Stand - Badarpur Road, Malviya Nagar Metro - Sohna Road serves the station from outside metro station stop.

== See also ==
- Mehrauli
- List of Delhi Metro stations
- Transport in Delhi
- Delhi Metro Rail Corporation
- Delhi Suburban Railway
- Delhi Monorail
- Delhi Transport Corporation
- South East Delhi
- New Delhi
- National Capital Region (India)
- List of rapid transit systems
- List of metro systems
