= Saket metro station =

Metro station in Delhi, India

Saket

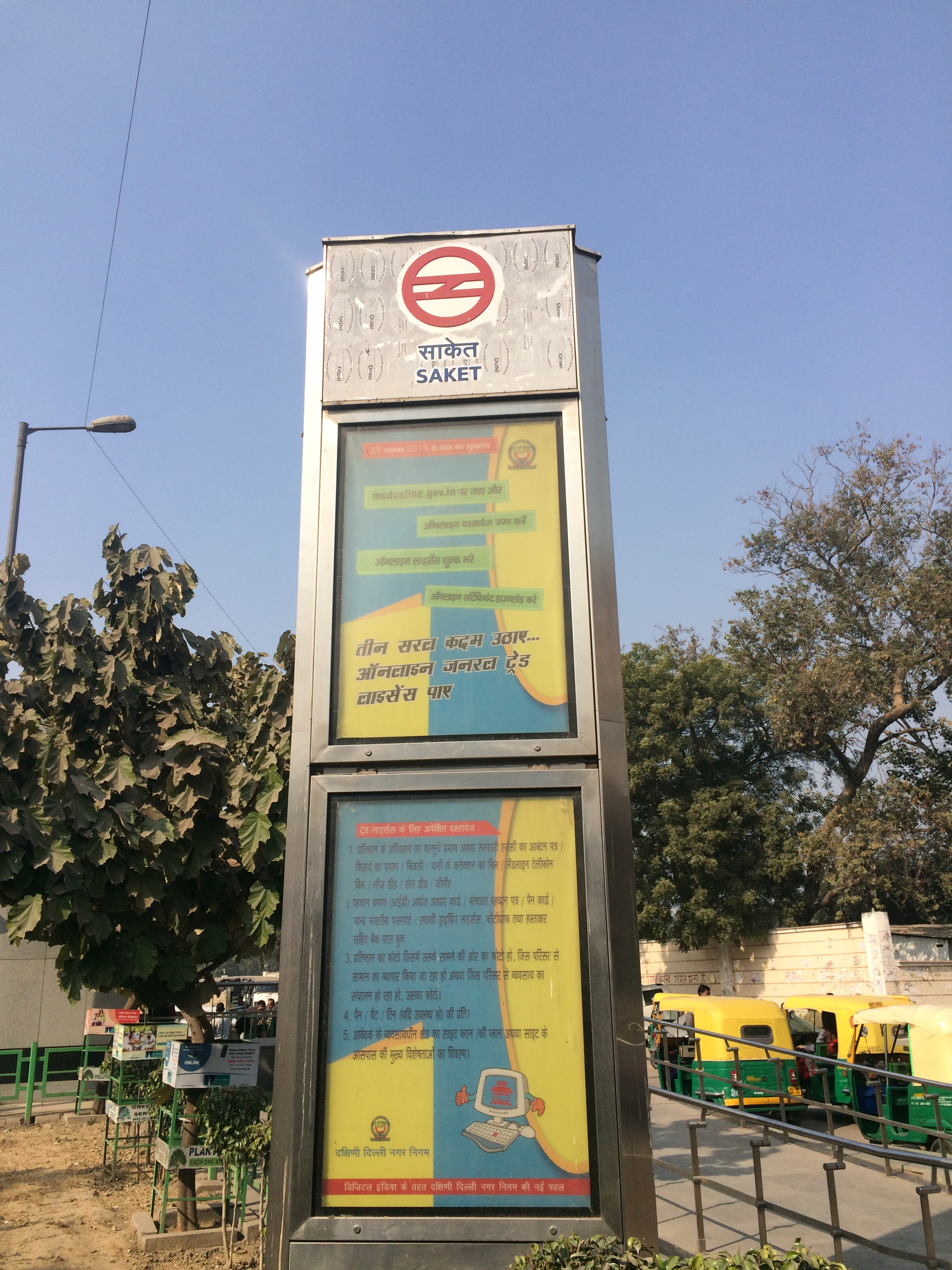
- Saket metro station -(Entrance)

General information
- Location: Mehrauli-Badarpur Road, Saket, South Delhi, Delhi,110030; India
- Coordinates: 28°31′14″N 77°12′06″E
- System: Delhi Metro station
- Owner: Delhi Metro
- Operator: Delhi Metro Rail Corporation (DMRC)
- Line: Yellow Line
- Platforms: Island platform; Platform-1 → Millennium City Centre Gurugram; Platform-2 → Samaypur Badli
- Tracks: 2

Construction
- Structure type: Underground, Double-track
- Platform levels: 2
- Parking: Available
- Accessible: Yes

Other information
- Status: Staffed, Operational
- Station code: SAKT

History
- Opened: 3 September 2010; 15 years ago
- Electrified: 25 kV 50 Hz AC through overhead catenary

Services
Preceding station	Delhi Metro	Following station
Malviya Nagar towards Samaypur Badli	Yellow Line	Qutub Minar towards Millennium City Centre Gurugram
Route map
Location

The Saket metro station is located on the Yellow Line of the Delhi Metro. It is the last underground station on the southern end of the Yellow Line of Delhi Metro.

Situated on Mehrauli-Badarpur Road, in Saidad ul Ajaib near Saket, it serves the southern parts of Saket, including Golf Green, while the Malviya Nagar station is closer to some houses in blocks A, B, C, D and G. There are entrances in Block D and near the Garden of Five Senses.

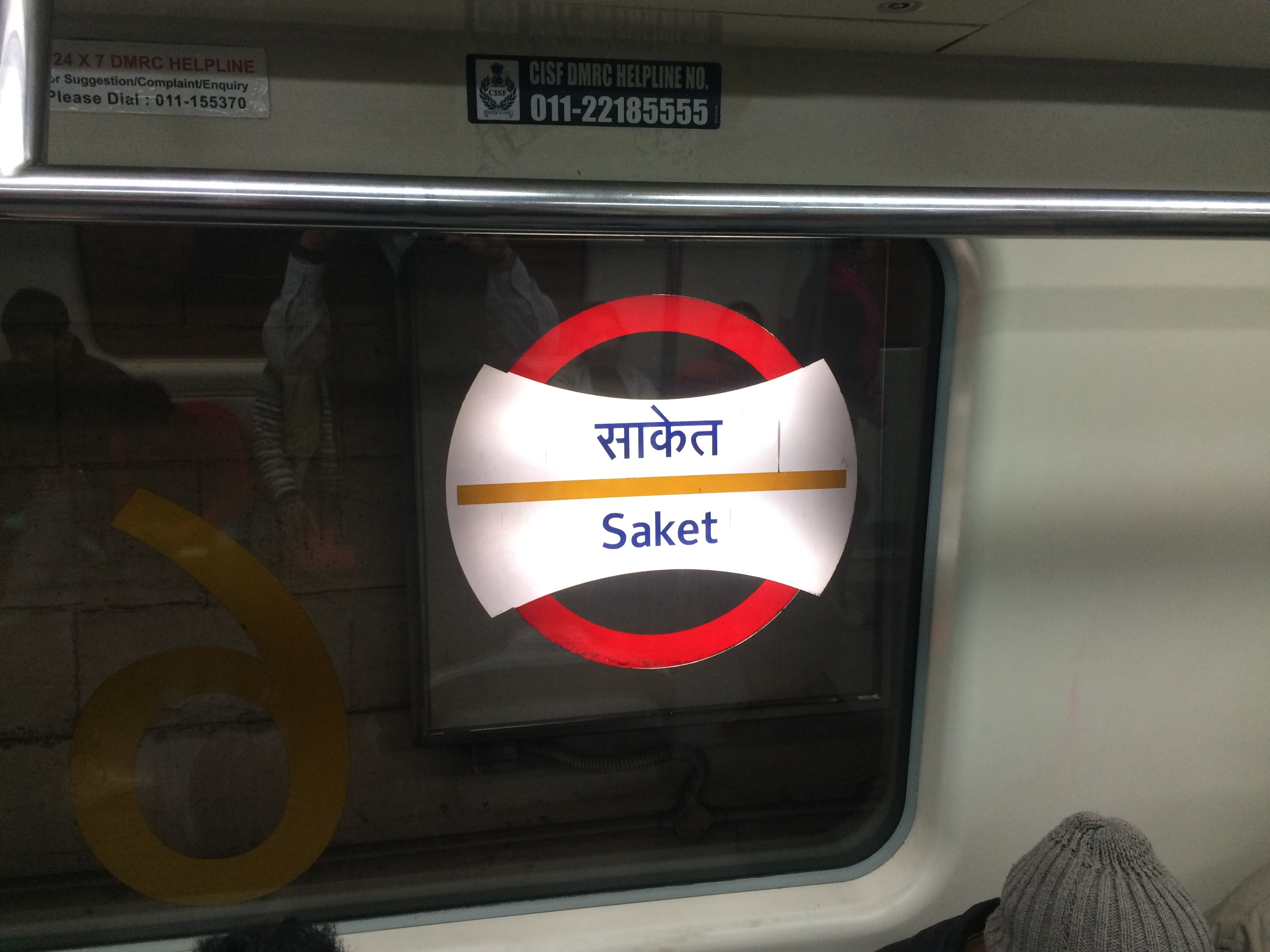
Saket metro station – Platform board

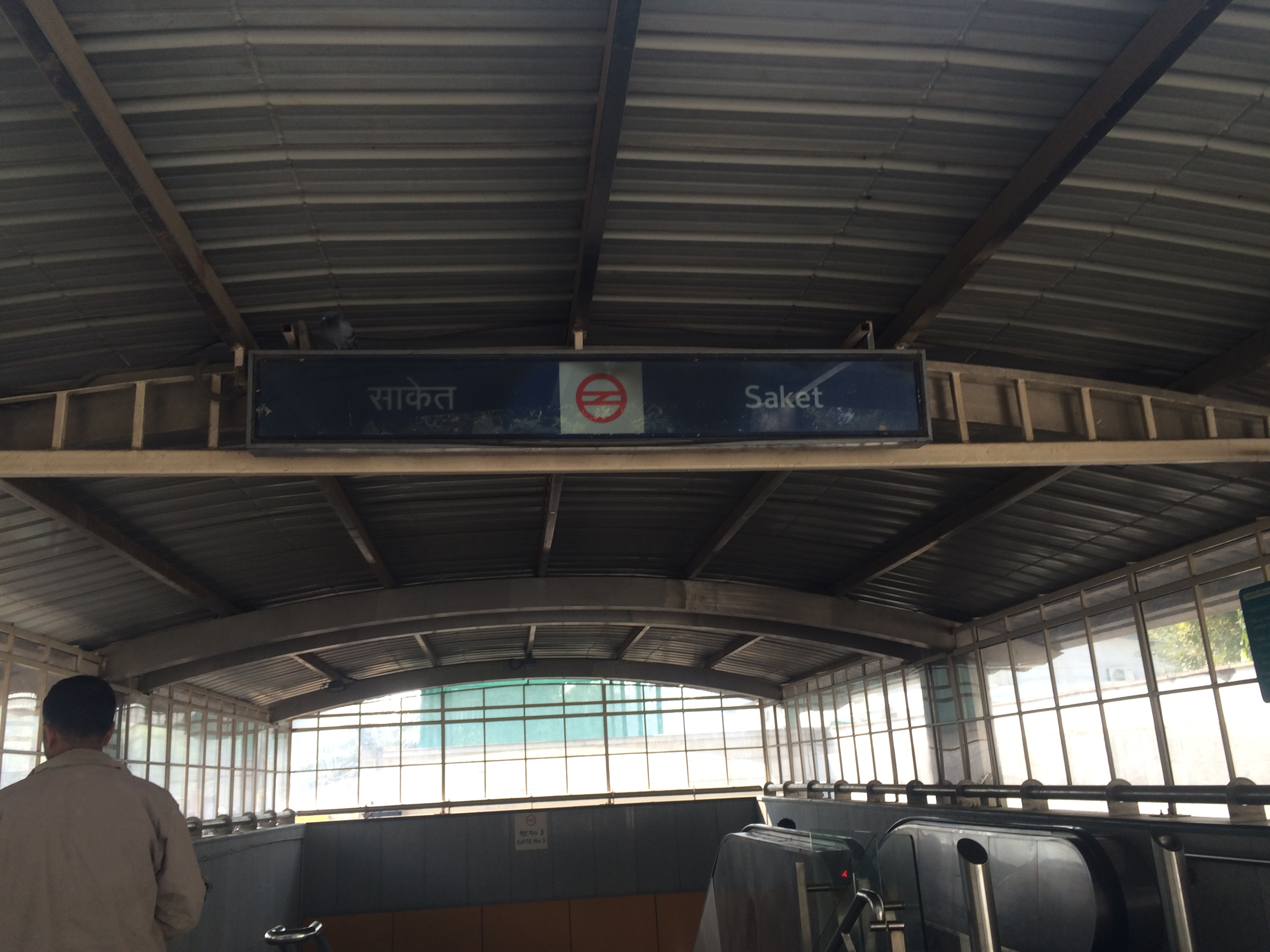
Saket metro station – Entrance board

== Station layout ==
G	Street level	Exit/Entrance
C	Concourse	Fare control, station agent, Ticket/token, shops
P	Platform 1 Southbound	Towards → Millennium City Centre Gurugram; Next Station: Qutab Minar
P	Island platform | Doors will open on the right
P	Platform 2 Northbound	Towards ← Samaypur Badli; Next Station: Malviya Nagar

=== Facilities ===
List of available ATM at Saket West metro station are HDFC Bank, Yes Bank, SBI

== Entry/exit ==
Saket West metro station Entry/exits
Gate No-1	Gate No-2	Gate No-3

== Connections ==
=== Bus ===
Delhi Transport Corporation bus routes number 34, 34A, 427, 463, 525STL, 717, 717A, 717B, Badarpur Border Terminal – Gurugram Bus Stand, serves the station from nearby Saidulajab bus stop.

== See also ==
- New Delhi
- Saket (Delhi)
- List of Delhi Metro stations
- Transport in Delhi
- Delhi Metro Rail Corporation
- Delhi Suburban Railway
- Delhi Transport Corporation
- South Delhi
- National Capital Region (India)
- List of rapid transit systems
- List of metro systems
