= Chhatarpur metro station =

Metro station in Delhi, India

Chhatarpur

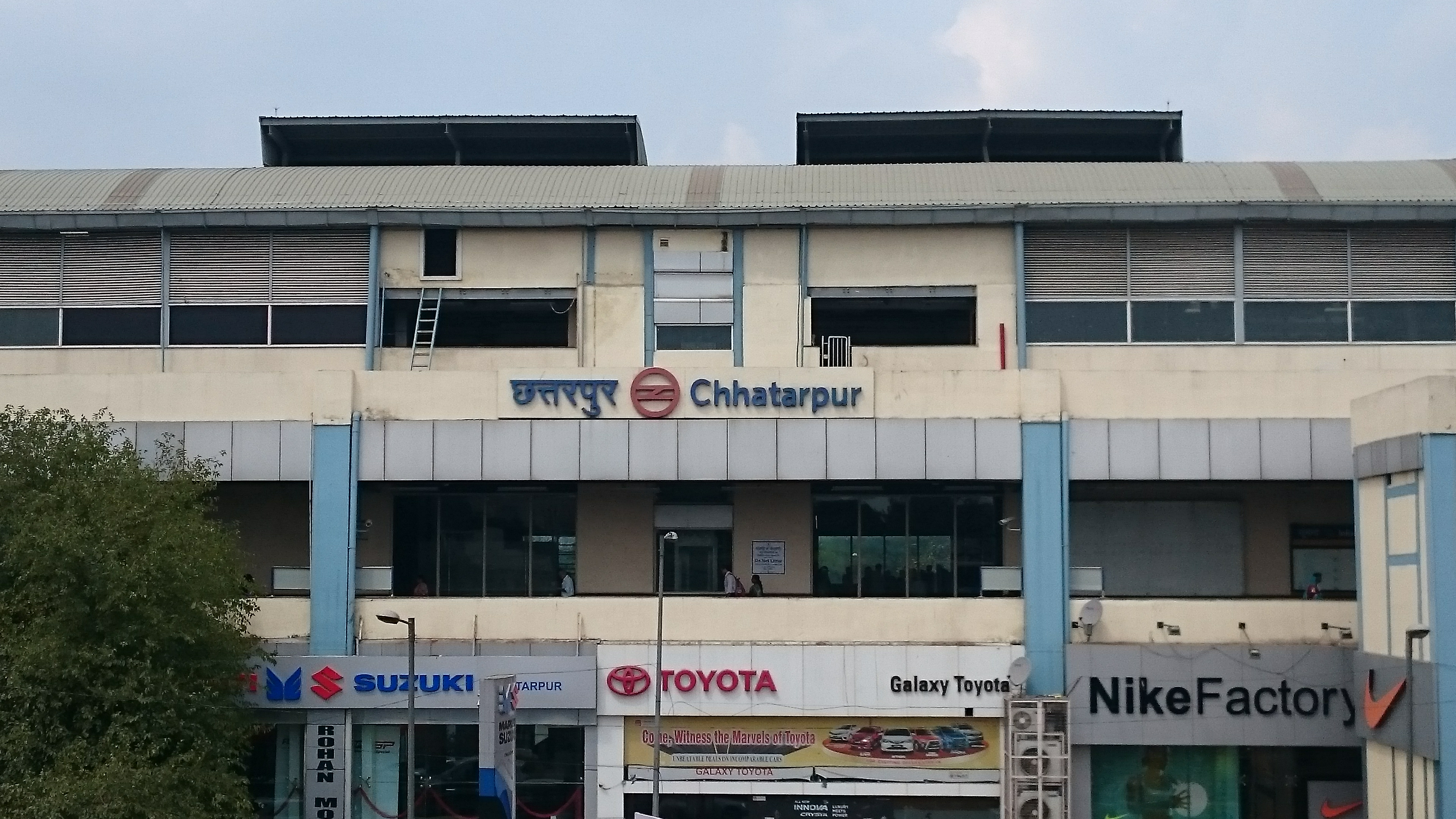
- Front view of the Chhatarpur metro station

General information
- Location: Chhatarpur, South West Delhi; India
- Coordinates: 28°30′24″N 77°10′30″E
- System: Delhi Metro station
- Owner: Delhi Metro Rail Corporation Ltd. (DMRC)
- Line: Yellow Line Golden Line
- Platforms: Side platform; Platform-1 → Millennium City Centre Gurugram; Platform-2 → Samaypur Badli
- Tracks: 2

Construction
- Structure type: Elevated
- Platform levels: 2
- Parking: Available
- Accessible: Yes

Other information
- Station code: CHTP

History
- Opened: 26 August 2010; 16 years ago
- Electrified: 25 kV 50 Hz AC through overhead catenary

Passengers
- 2015: 11,50,275; 37,106 Month average

Services
Preceding station	Delhi Metro	Following station
Qutab Minar towards Samaypur Badli	Yellow Line	Sultanpur towards Millennium City Centre Gurugram
Future service
Kishangarh towards Terminal 1 IGI Airport	Golden Line	Chhatarpur Mandir towards Kalindi Kunj
Route map
Location

Chhattarpur is an elevated metro station on the Yellow Line of the Delhi Metro, located on Mehrauli–Gurugram Road in South Delhi.

Chhattarpur station was originally scheduled to open in June 2010 along with the other stations on the elevated Qutub Minar–HUDA City Centre section of the Yellow Line. However, its construction was delayed due to land acquisition issues. To complete the station before the 2010 Commonwealth Games, the Delhi Metro Rail Corporation (DMRC) adopted a special construction method using prefabricated structural steel components instead of conventional concrete construction. The station commenced public operations on 26 August 2010, after being constructed in a record time of nine months. It is the only station in the Delhi Metro network to have been constructed entirely using structural steel.

== History ==
The Delhi Metro Rail Corporation (DMRC) began seeking land for the construction of Chhattarpur station in 2006. Approximately 2 hectares (4.9 acres) were required for the station building, an electrical substation, parking and other utilities. However, acquisition was delayed due to prolonged legal disputes involving three plots of land. DMRC initially considered dropping the station from the corridor, but this would have left a 2.7 kilometres (1.7 mi) gap between Qutub Minar and Sultanpur stations. The station was also expected to serve Vasant Kunj, the Chhattarpur temple and nearby farmhouses, with an estimated daily ridership of 11,723 commuters by 2012.

To complete the station within the corridor's construction schedule, DMRC adopted a prefabricated structural steel design, which was estimated to cost 30 to 50% more than conventional construction. The steel beams and columns were fabricated at a factory in Gurgaon and assembled at the site. DMRC took possession of the land in November 2009, and construction began in October 2009. The station was completed in nine months and opened to commuters on 26 August 2010.

The Qutub Minar–HUDA City Centre section of the Yellow Line commenced operations on 21 June 2010, with ten stations on the corridor. However, trains initially skipped Chhattarpur station, which was still under construction due to land acquisition delays. Construction of the station was completed in August 2010, and it received the mandatory safety clearance from the Commissioner of Metro Rail Safety (CMRS) on 25 August 2010. Chhattarpur station opened to the public the following day, on 26 August 2010, after being constructed in a record time of nine months.

== Facilities ==
When the station opened in August 2010, it had a parking facility spread over approximately 12,000 square metres (130,000 sq ft), which was reported to be the largest among Delhi Metro stations at the time. Initially, around 4,000 square metres (43,000 sq ft) of the parking area was opened, with provision for 800 two-wheelers and 200 cars. The remaining area was scheduled to become operational in phases.

In July 2019, the Delhi Metro Rail Corporation completed a multi-modal integration (MMI) redevelopment of the station area. The project included a green public plaza, dedicated pick-up and drop-off areas, and parking bays for buses, Gramin Sewa vehicles and auto-rickshaws. Space was also provided for feeder buses and other last-mile transport services, along with pedestrian-friendly walkways.

The station serves the surrounding localities of Chhattarpur, Mehrauli, Kishangarh and Vasant Kunj, as well as visitors travelling to the Chhattarpur temple complex.

List of available automated teller machines at Chhatarpur metro station are:

- RBL Bank
- Canara Bank
- HDFC Bank
- State Bank of India

== Station layout ==
L2	Side platform | Doors will open on the left
L2	Platform 1 Southbound	Towards → Millennium City Centre Gurugram; Next Station: Sultanpur
L2	Platform 2 Northbound	Towards ← Samaypur Badli; Next Station: Qutab Minar
L2	Side platform | Doors will open on the left
L1	Concourse	Fare control, station agent, Metro Card vending machines, crossover
G	Street level	Exit/Entrance

== Gallery ==
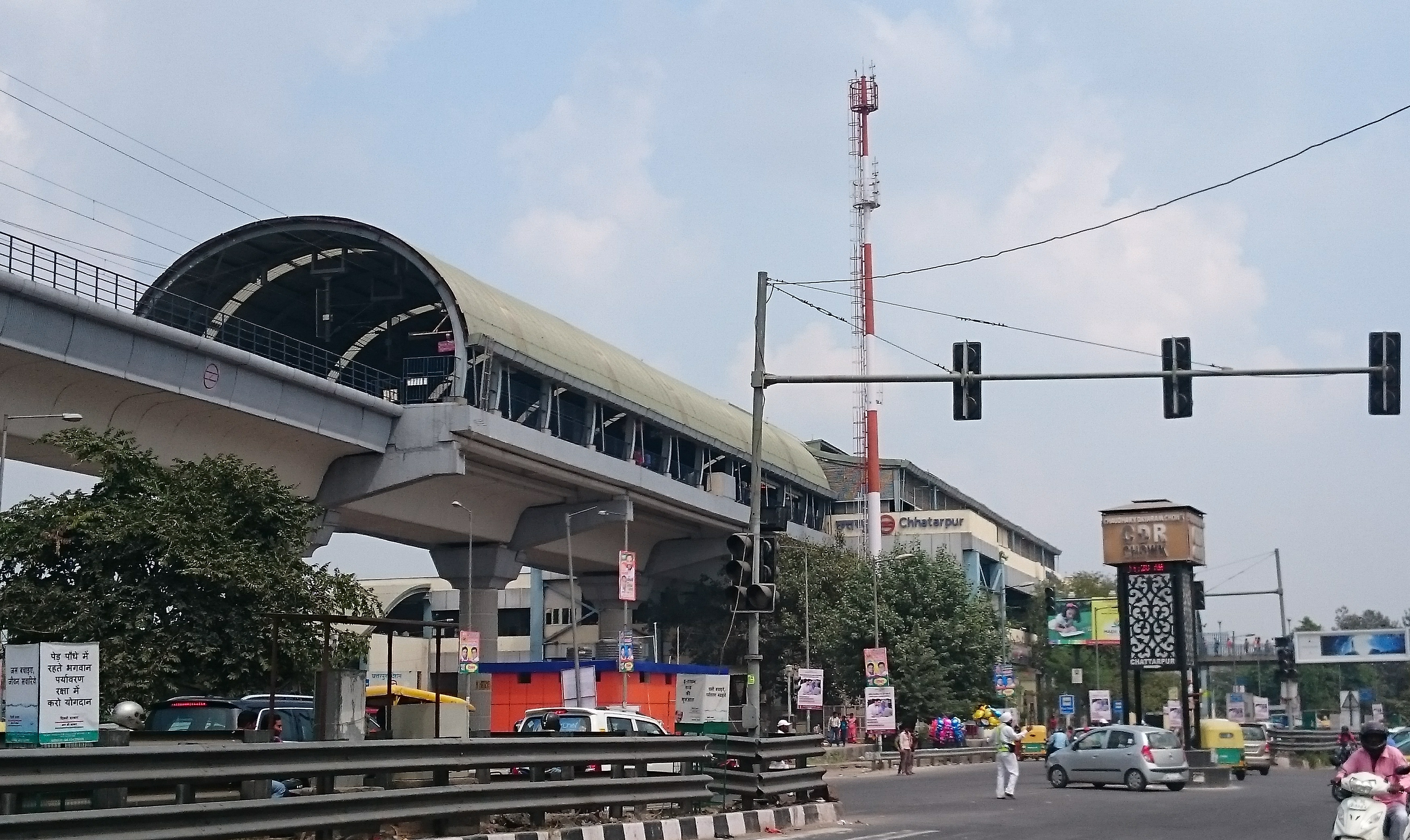
View from CDR Chowk Chhatarpur metro station

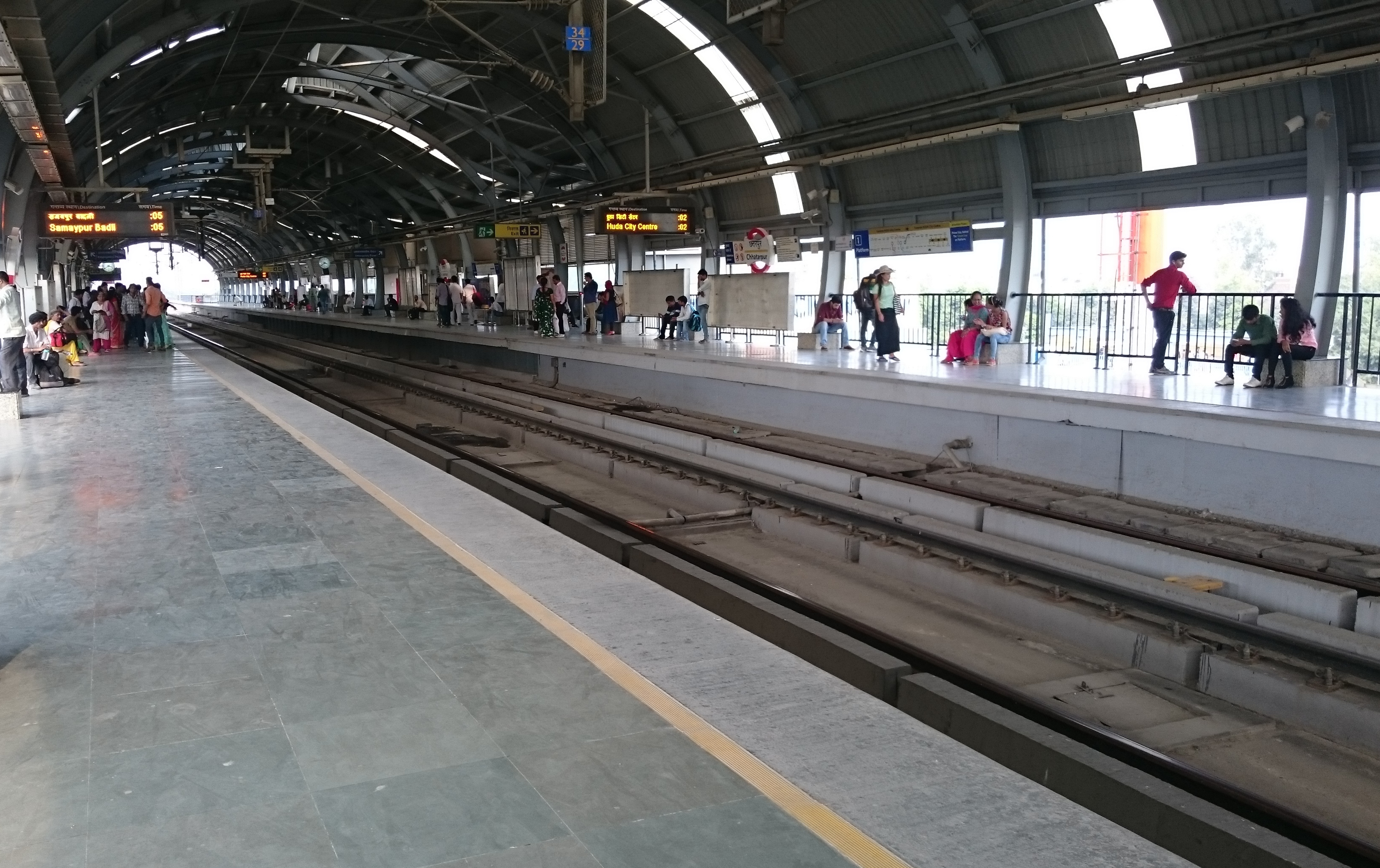
Chhatarpur Metro station Platform view

== See also ==
- List of Delhi Metro stations
- Transport in Delhi
- Delhi Metro Rail Corporation
- Delhi Suburban Railway
- Delhi Transport Corporation
- South Delhi
- Chhatarpur, Delhi (Vidhan Sabha constituency)
- Chhatarpur Temple
- Qutab Minar metro station
- National Capital Region (India)
- List of rapid transit systems
- List of metro systems
