= Sultanpur metro station =

Metro station in Delhi, India

Sultanpur

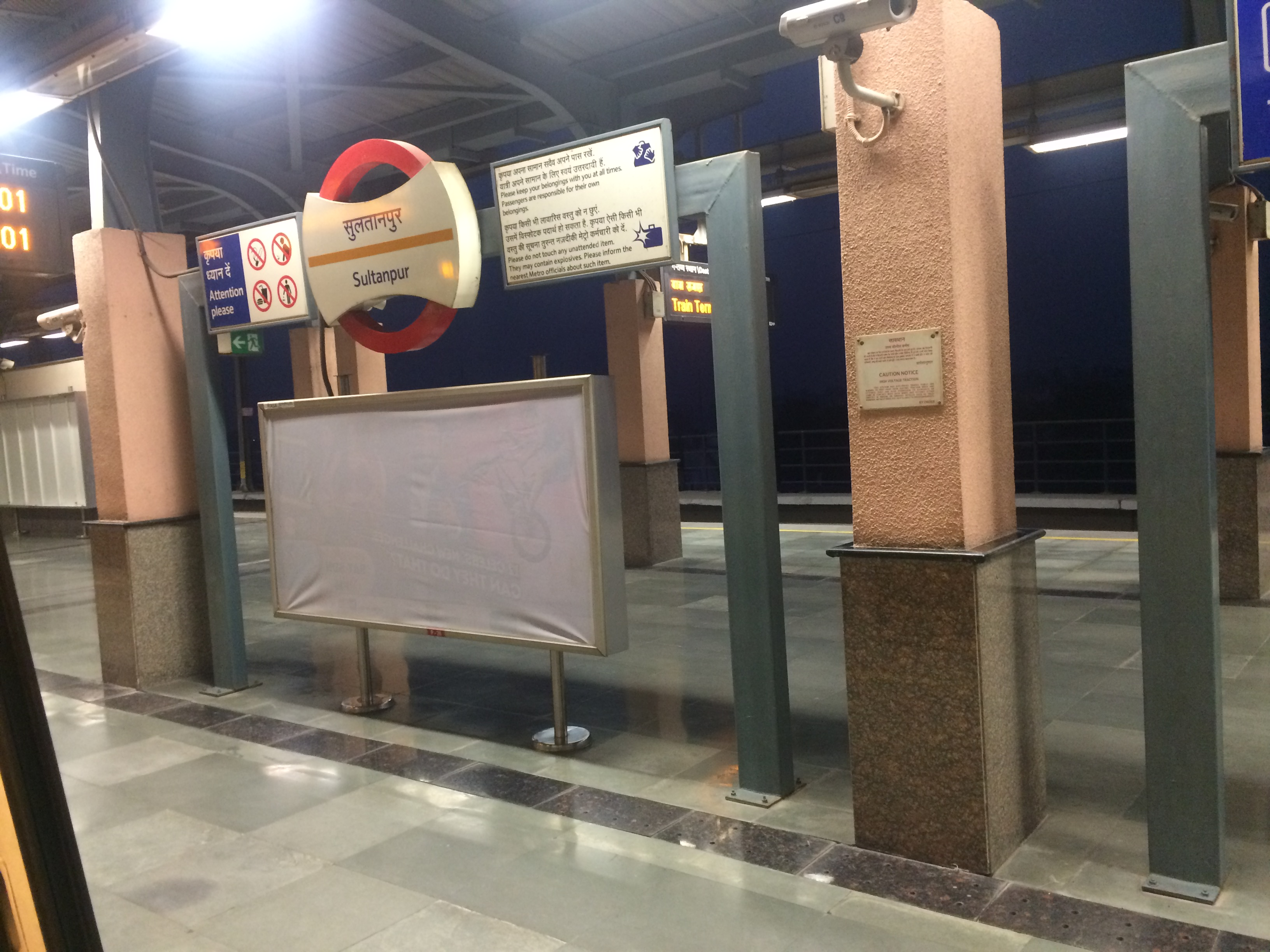

General information
- Location: Mehrauli Gurgaon Road Delhi 110030; India
- Coordinates: 28°29′57″N 77°09′41″E
- System: Delhi Metro station
- Owner: Delhi Metro
- Operator: Delhi Metro Rail Corporation (DMRC)
- Line: Yellow Line
- Platforms: Side platform; Platform-1 → Millennium City Centre Gurugram; Platform-2 → Samaypur Badli; Platform-3 → Train Terminates
- Tracks: 3

Construction
- Structure type: Elevated, Double-track
- Platform levels: 2
- Parking: Available
- Accessible: Yes

Other information
- Status: Staffed, Operational
- Station code: SLTP

History
- Opened: 21 June 2010; 16 years ago
- Electrified: 25 kV 50 Hz AC through overhead catenary

Passengers
- Jan 2015: 5,555/day 172,190/ Month average

Services
Preceding station	Delhi Metro	Following station
Chhatarpur towards Samaypur Badli	Yellow Line	Ghitorni towards Millennium City Centre Gurugram
Route map
Location

The Sultanpur metro station is located on the Yellow Line of the Delhi Metro. During Peak hours, it serves as an alternate southern Terminus for the yellow line along with Qutab Minar.

== History ==
=== Station layout ===
L2	Side platform | Doors will open on the left
L2	Platform 1 Southbound	Towards → Millennium City Centre Gurugram; Next Station: Ghitorni
L2	Platform 2 Northbound	Towards ← Samaypur Badli; Next Station: Chhatarpur
L2	Side platform | Doors will open on the left
L1	Concourse	Fare control, station agent, Metro Card vending machines, crossover
G	Street Level	Exit/Entrance

=== Facilities ===
List of available ATM at Sultanpur metro station are

== Entry/Exit ==
Sultanpur metro station Entry/exits
Gate No-1	Gate No-2	Gate No-3	Gate No-4

== Connections ==
=== Bus ===
Delhi Transport Corporation bus routes number 517, Badarpur Border - Gurugram Bus Stand, Gurgaon Bus Stand - Badarpur Road, Malviya Nagar Metro - Sohna Road serves the station from outside metro station stop.

== See also ==
- Mehrauli
- Chandan Hola
- Sultanpur, Delhi
- List of Delhi Metro stations
- Transport in Delhi
- Delhi Metro Rail Corporation
- Delhi Suburban Railway
- Delhi Monorail
- Delhi Transport Corporation
- South East Delhi
- New Delhi
- National Capital Region (India)
- List of rapid transit systems
- List of metro systems
