= Chawri Bazar metro station =

Metro station in Delhi, India

Chawri Bazar

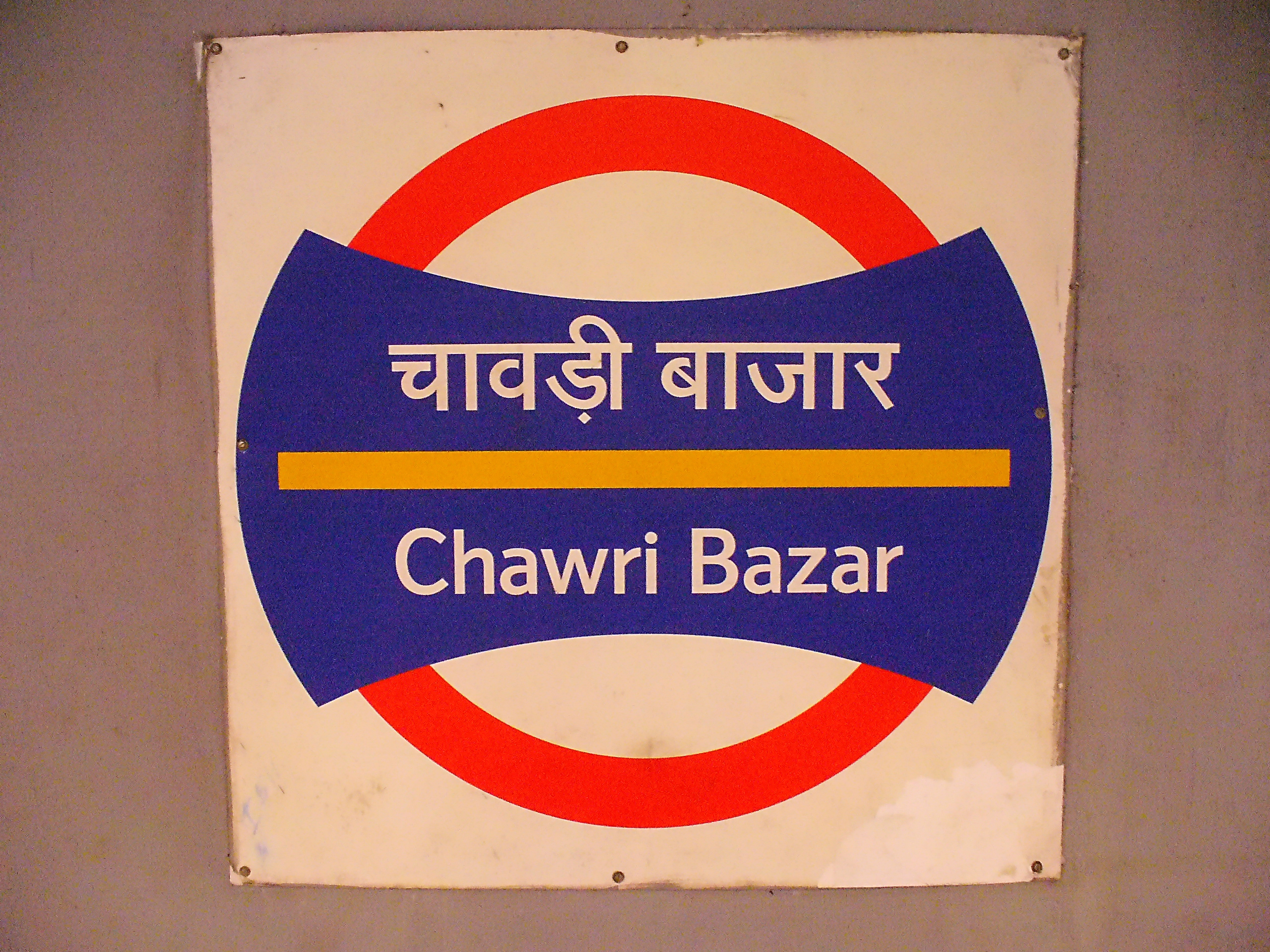

General information
- Location: Ajmere Gate Road, Chawri Bazar, Hauz Qazi, Old Delhi, 110006; India
- Coordinates: 28°38′59″N 77°13′34″E
- System: Delhi Metro station
- Owner: Delhi Metro
- Line: Yellow Line
- Platforms: Island platform; Platform-1 → Millennium City Centre Gurugram; Platform-2 → Samaypur Badli
- Tracks: 2

Construction
- Structure type: Underground
- Depth: 25 metres (82 ft)
- Platform levels: 3
- Accessible: Yes

Other information
- Station code: CWBR

History
- Opened: 3 July 2005; 21 years ago
- Electrified: 25 kV 50 Hz AC through overhead catenary

Passengers
- Jan 2015: 939,508; 30,307 Daily Average

Services
Preceding station	Delhi Metro	Following station
Chandni Chowk towards Samaypur Badli	Yellow Line	New Delhi towards Millennium City Centre Gurugram
Route map
Location

Chawri Bazar is an underground metro station on the Yellow Line of the Delhi Metro, located in the Chawri Bazar locality of Old Delhi. It commenced operations on 3 July 2005 as part of the Kashmere Gate–Central Secretariat section of the Yellow Line.

== The station ==
Chawri Bazar is the second-deepest metro station on the Delhi Metro network, after Hauz Khas on the Magenta Line. It is situated approximately 25 metres (82 ft) below ground level. The station provides access to nearby historical landmarks in Old Delhi, including Jama Masjid and the Red Fort. It is also located within reach of two major railway stations, Delhi Junction (Old Delhi) and New Delhi railway station.

=== Station layout ===
G	Street level	Exit/Entrance
C	Concourse	Fare control, station agent, Ticket/token, shops
P	Platform 1 Southbound	Towards → Millennium City Centre Gurugram; Next Station: New Delhi Change at the next station for Airport Express
P	Island platform | Doors will open on the right
P	Platform 2 Northbound	Towards ← Samaypur Badli; Next Station: Chandni Chowk

== See also ==
- List of Delhi Metro stations
- Transport in Delhi
- Delhi Metro Rail Corporation
- Delhi Suburban Railway
- Delhi Transport Corporation
- North Delhi
- National Capital Region (India)
- List of rapid transit systems
- List of metro systems
