= Rohini Sector 18, 19 metro station =

Metro station in Delhi, India

Rohini Sector 18, 19

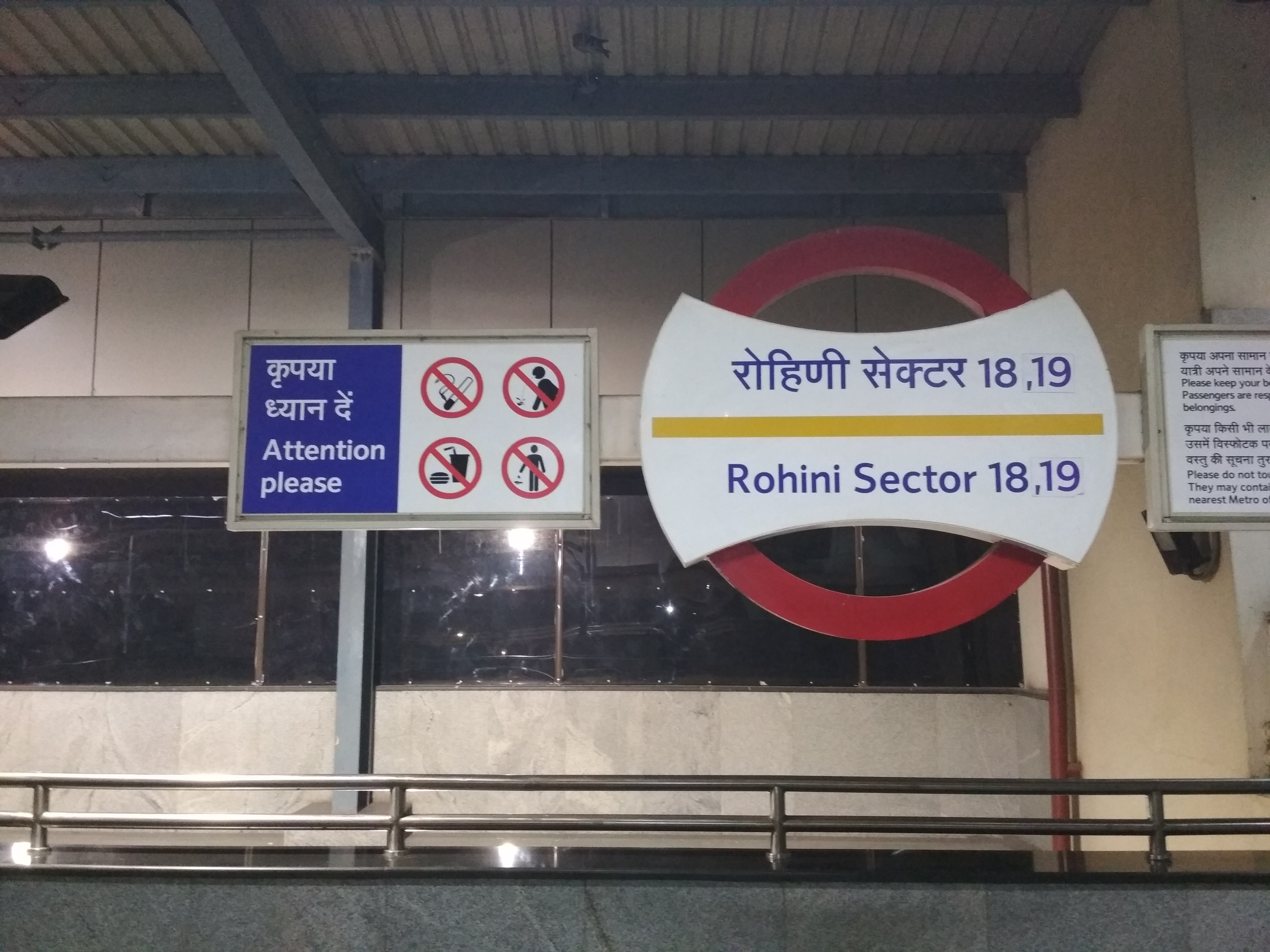

General information
- Location: Block C, Sector 18-Sector 19, Rohini, Delhi, 110089; India
- Coordinates: 28°44′18″N 77°08′24″E
- System: Delhi Metro station
- Owner: Delhi Metro
- Operator: Delhi Metro Rail Corporation (DMRC)
- Line: Yellow Line
- Platforms: Side platform; Platform-1 → Millennium City Centre Gurugram; Platform-2 → Samaypur Badli
- Tracks: 2

Construction
- Structure type: Elevated, Double-track
- Platform levels: 2
- Parking: Available
- Accessible: Yes

Other information
- Status: Staffed, Operational
- Station code: RISE

History
- Opened: 10 November 2015; 10 years ago
- Electrified: 25 kV 50 Hz AC through overhead catenary

Services
Preceding station	Delhi Metro	Following station
Samaypur Badli Terminus	Yellow Line	Haiderpur Badli Mor towards Millennium City Centre Gurugram
Route map
Location

The Rohini Sector 18, 19 is a station on the Yellow Line of the Delhi Metro. It is an elevated station and is located in Sector 18-19, Rohini in the National Capital Region of Delhi, India. The station was inaugurated on 10 November 2015.

== Station layout ==
L2	Side platform | Doors will open on the left
L2	Platform 1 Southbound	Towards → Millennium City Centre Gurugram; Next Station: Haiderpur Badli Mor
L2	Platform 2 Northbound	Towards ← Samaypur Badli
L2	Side platform | Doors will open on the left
L1	Concourse	Fare control, station agent, Metro Card vending machines, crossover
G	Street Level	Exit/Entrance

== Entry/exit ==
Rohini Sector 18, 19 station Entry/exits
Gate No-1	Gate No-2
Divyajyoti Apartments, Sector 19, Rohini & Badli Village	Paradise Apartments, Sector 18 Rohini

== Connections ==
=== Bus ===
Delhi Transport Corporation bus routes number 107, 116, 119, 123, 130, 140 169, 879A, 985 serves the station from nearby Rohini Sector 18 bus stop.

== See also ==
- List of Delhi Metro stations
- Transport in Delhi
- Delhi Metro Rail Corporation
- Delhi Suburban Railway
- Delhi Transport Corporation
- North Delhi
- National Capital Region (India)
- List of rapid transit systems
- List of metro systems
