= Qutab Minar metro station =

Metro station in Delhi, India

Qutab Minar

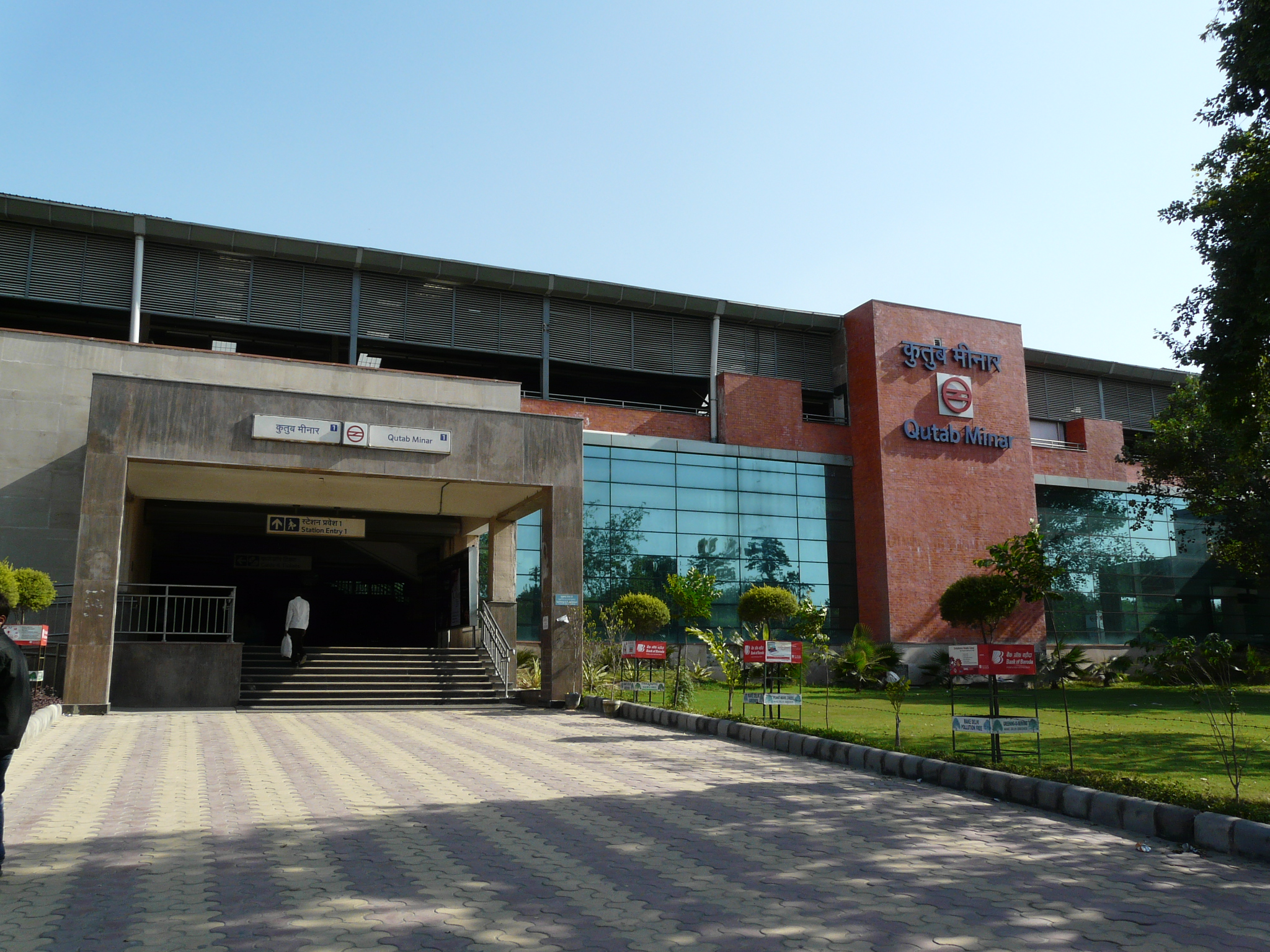

General information
- Location: Anuvrat Marg New Delhi 110030; India
- Coordinates: 28°30′47″N 77°11′11″E
- System: Delhi Metro station
- Owner: Delhi Metro
- Line: Yellow Line
- Platforms: Side platform; Platform-1 → Millennium City Centre Gurugram; Platform-2 → Samaypur Badli
- Tracks: 2

Construction
- Structure type: Elevated
- Platform levels: 2
- Parking: Available
- Accessible: Yes

Other information
- Station code: QM

History
- Opened: 21 June 2010; 16 years ago
- Electrified: 25 kV 50 Hz AC through overhead catenary

Passengers
- 2015: 187,259

Services
Preceding station	Delhi Metro	Following station
Saket towards Samaypur Badli	Yellow Line	Chhatarpur towards Millennium City Centre Gurugram
Route map
Location

Qutab Minar is an elevated station on the Yellow Line of the Delhi Metro. It was inaugurated on 21 June 2010 as part of the 14.47 km (8.99 mi) completely elevated corridor from Qutab Minar – HUDA City Centre.

The station is close to the Qutb Minar and its monuments, a UNESCO World Heritage Site. Parking facilities are available here. During peak hours, it serves as an alternate southern terminus for the yellow line along with Sultanpur.

== Station layout ==
L2	Side platform | Doors will open on the left
L2	Platform 1 Southbound	Towards → Millennium City Centre Gurugram; Next Station: Chhatarpur
L2	Platform 2 Northbound	Towards ← Samaypur Badli; Next Station: Saket
L2	Side platform | Doors will open on the left
L1	Concourse	Fare control, station agent, Metro Card vending machines, crossover
G	Street level	Exit/Entrance

== Facilities ==
ATMs are available at Qutab Minar metro station.

== See also ==
- List of Delhi Metro stations
- Transport in Delhi
- Delhi Metro Rail Corporation
- Delhi Suburban Railway
- Qutb Minar
- Qutb Minar complex
- Qutb
