= Sainik Farm =

- District Subdivision
- Location in Delhi, India
- Coordinates: 28.506882°N 77.211229°E
- Country: India
- State: Delhi
- District: South Delhi

Languages
  - Official: Hindi, English
- Time zone: UTC+5:30 (IST)
- Telephone code: 011
- Vehicle registration: DL 3C

Sainik Farm is an affluent settlement in Delhi where prominent people reside. The area has been embroiled in legal trouble over its legitimacy. It is situated south of Saket beyond the Mehrauli-Badarpur Road in the southernmost part of the city.

== History ==
The settlement came up in the 1960s a cooperative society for defense staff and their families.

However, the area was soon embroiled in controversy and has remained so ever since. The unauthorized residencies in the area have continuously been in a legal quagmire as the Delhi High Court has passed several adverse remarks against the illegal constructions and farm houses in the area, and passed directions to the Delhi Government to take action to tackle the illegal residential constructions. From time to time, several political parties have also taken up the issue of the illegality of the settlement through campaigns as well as assembly debates. The supply of utilities such as water and electricity have been provisionally permitted in the area to curb theft. From time to time, there have been indications that some form of action may be taken against the owners of the illegal farm houses in the area by means of stiff penalties and/ or demolitions.

While the general perception is that the area is occupied by affluent and influential personalities, despite many efforts the residents have failed to have the colony regularized, which has been the subject of focus in the mainstream media as well as judicial scrutiny. The area has repeatedly failed to appear on the list of unauthorised settlements which have been legitimised by the Government in view of the ongoing legal issues, while thousands of other unauthorized colonies have been regularized in the meantime.

While the Sainik Farms Resident Welfare Association has for long claimed that Sainik Farms is on the verge of becoming legalized, the same has not been the case and there appears to be a cloud of uncertainty on the fate of the residents in the area. The area was not regularized in 2009, when a list of 1,218 illegal colonies in Delhi to be regularized was released. Then, in 2012 once again Sainik Farms missed the list of 1,639 unauthorised colonies which were regularized by the Delhi Development Authority

== Schools ==
- Krishna Maheshwari Sansthan
- St. Mary's Public School

== Near By Places ==
- Saket Metro Station
- Saket City
- Saket Select City walk Mall
- Saket District Centre (Court)
