= IFFCO Chowk metro station =

Metro station in Delhi, India

IFFCO Chowk

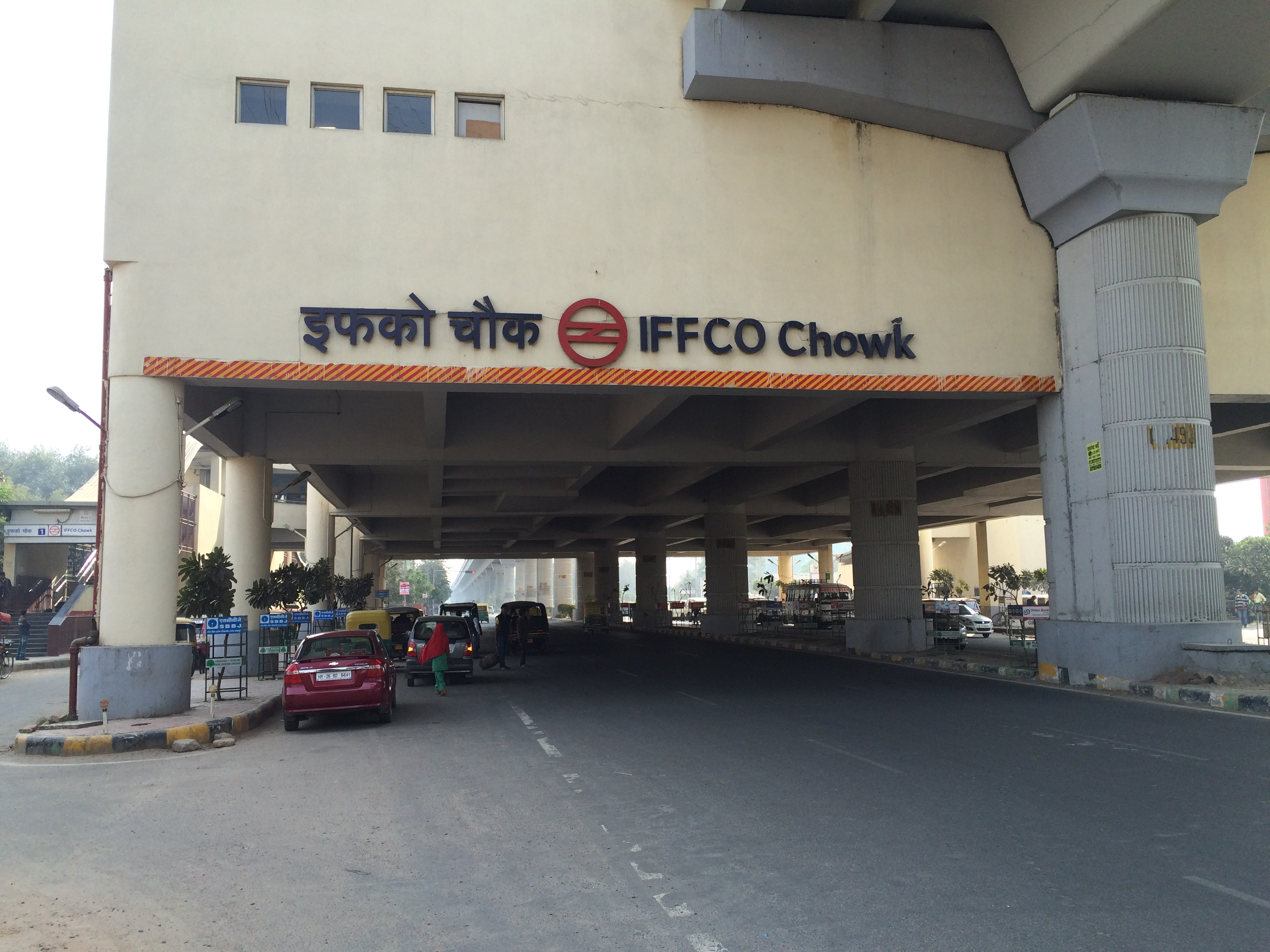

General information
- Location: Sector 29, Gurugram, Haryana 122002; India
- Coordinates: 28°28′20″N 77°04′21″E
- System: Delhi Metro station
- Owner: Delhi Metro
- Operator: Delhi Metro Rail Corporation (DMRC)
- Line: Yellow Line
- Platforms: Side platform; Platform-1 → Millennium City Centre Gurugram; Platform-2 → Samaypur Badli
- Tracks: 2

Construction
- Structure type: Elevated, Double-track
- Platform levels: 2
- Parking: Available
- Accessible: Yes

Other information
- Status: Staffed, Operational
- Station code: IFOC

History
- Opened: 21 June 2010; 16 years ago
- Electrified: 25 kV 50 Hz AC through overhead catenary

Passengers
- Jan 2015: 21,837/day 676,959/ Month average

Services
Preceding station	Delhi Metro	Following station
MG Road towards Samaypur Badli	Yellow Line	Millennium City Centre Gurugram Terminus
Route map
Location

The IFFCO Chowk metro station is located on the Yellow Line of the Delhi Metro.

The station is located near the headquarters of IFFCO, PowerGrid Corporation of India and RITES Limited. It is also in the vicinity of Essel Towers (residential complex) and Westin Hotel, Gurugram.

== History ==
=== Station layout ===
L2	Side platform | Doors will open on the left
L2	Platform 1 Southbound	Towards → Millennium City Centre Gurugram
L2	Platform 2 Northbound	Towards ← Samaypur Badli; Next Station: MG Road
L2	Side platform | Doors will open on the left
L1	Concourse	Fare control, station agent, Metro Card vending machines, crossover
G	Street Level	Exit/Entrance

=== Facilities ===
List of available ATM at IFFCO Chowk metro station are HDFC Bank, State Bank of India

== Entry/Exit ==
IFFCO Chowk metro station Entry/exits
Gate No-1	Gate No-2	Gate No-3

== Connections ==
=== Bus ===
Bus routes OLA19, OLA105, OLA137, OLA140 serves the station from outside metro station stop.

== See also ==
- Haryana
- Gurgaon
- List of Delhi Metro stations
- Transport in Delhi
- Delhi Metro Rail Corporation
- Delhi Suburban Railway
- Delhi Monorail
- Delhi Transport Corporation
- South East Delhi
- New Delhi
- National Capital Region (India)
- List of rapid transit systems
- List of metro systems
