= Geetanjali Enclave =

- Neighborhood of Delhi
- Location in Delhi, India
- Coordinates: 28.5189°N 77.2131°E
- Country: India
- State: Delhi
- District: South Delhi

Languages
  - Official: Hindi
- Time zone: UTC+5:30 (IST)
- Planning agency: MCD

== Location ==
Geetanjali Enclave is a colony in Malviya Nagar in the southern part of Delhi, India. It is next to the Shivalik colony. Geetanjali colony is a cooperative residential society Colony with registered office at C-9 Geetanjali and with approx 174 members were allotted residential plots. The colony has secured entry from three gates: one from Saket and two gates at Shivalik Road.

== Places of interest ==
Banks:

- Punjab National Bank, A Block.
- HDFC Bank in B Block.
- ATM's Near by, almost of every bank

Markets:

- Geetanjali STC MMTC Market
- Navjeevan Vihar Market
- Malviya Nagar Market nearly 2 km from Geetanjali
- Select City Mall 3 km From Geetanjali Enclave
- DLF Mall
- MGF Mall

Entertainment:

- PVR Anupam at Saket
- PVR at Select city Mall
- DT Cinema at DLF Mall
- Skiing facility at MGF mall

Hospitals:

- MAX Hospital
- G.M Modi Hospital
- Neptune Hospital

Coffee Shops:

- Both Barista Lavazza and Cafe Coffee Day
- Turquoise Cottage
- Days of Raj

== Transportation ==
The nearest metro station is Malviya Nagar at yellow line. D.T.C buses which pass by the periphery of Geetanjali Enclave. Bus routes passing are 512, 501, 548, 680. The Delhi government has started trial run of Mohalla busses in the area catering to Geetanjali Enclave and other neighbouring places.

Around 800 families were benefited by the DJB’s 24×7 water supply project in the Geetanjali Enclave and Navjeevan Vihar of Malviya Nagar from 2017 onwards.

== Highlights ==
1. Ram Temple - Geetanjali Enclave has a Ram temple in its premises, where all Hindu festivals are celebrated.
2. Green Area - Geetanjali has four parks where many local birds—such as doves, mynas, and owls—can be seen.
3. Geetanjali has its own club, with a basketball court, football field, and badminton court, as well as a lawn tennis facility run by a professional group.

== Nearby ==
=== Sightseeing ===
1. Qutub Minar - 2 km
2. Chattarpur Temple - 4 km
