= Malviya Nagar (Delhi) =

Malviya Nagar Mālavīya Nagara
- Neighborhood of Delhi
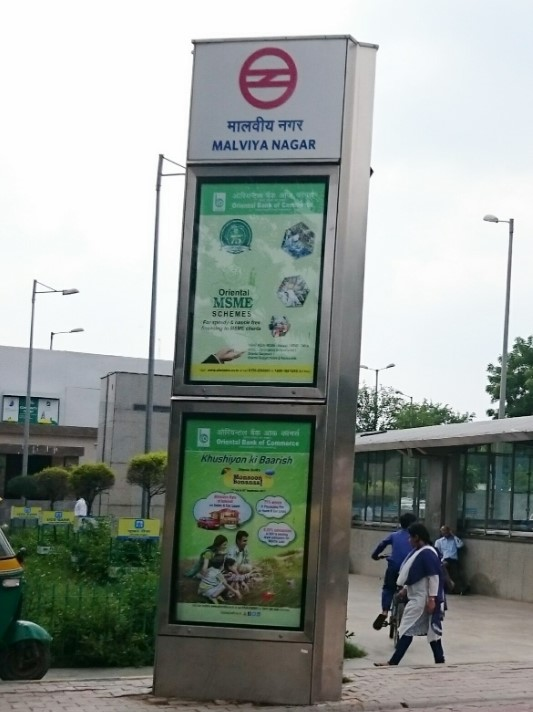
- Malviya Nagar metro station

- Location in Delhi, India
- Coordinates: 28.534°N 77.211°E
- Country: India
- State: Delhi
- District: South Delhi

Government
  - Body: Municipal Corporation of Delhi

Languages
  - Official: Hindi, English
- Time zone: UTC+5:30 (IST)
- PIN: 110017
- Vehicle registration: DL 3X XX XXXX
- Website: dmsouth.delhi.gov.in/divisions/malviya-nagar/

Malviya Nagar is a residential locality in South Delhi. Situated between Saket and Hauz Khas, its namesake is the freedom fighter Madan Mohan Malviya.

Malviya Nagar was initially a part of the Shahpur Jat village , in which after partition was populated in the 1950s by refugees from Pakistan, after the Partition of India. A large portion of the population were ethnic Rajasthani, U.P., Haryanvi, Punjabis and Sindhis, as well as Afghan refugees who were displaced during the Soviet–Afghan War in the 1970s and 1980s.

Today, Malviya Nagar is bounded by Panchsheel Enclave in the north, Sheikh Sarai in the east, Saket in the south and Hauz Khas in the west. Sub localities that are part of Malviya Nagar include Geetanjali Enclave, Navjeevan Vihar, Bhavishya Nidhi Enclave, Shivalik colony, Begumpur, Sarvodaya Enclave and MMTC Colony.

It is serviced by the Malviya Nagar station located on the Yellow Line of the Delhi Metro. Malviya Nagar is also home to Delhi Police's Training School. in 2026, A fire broke out which kills 21 people.

== Major sites ==
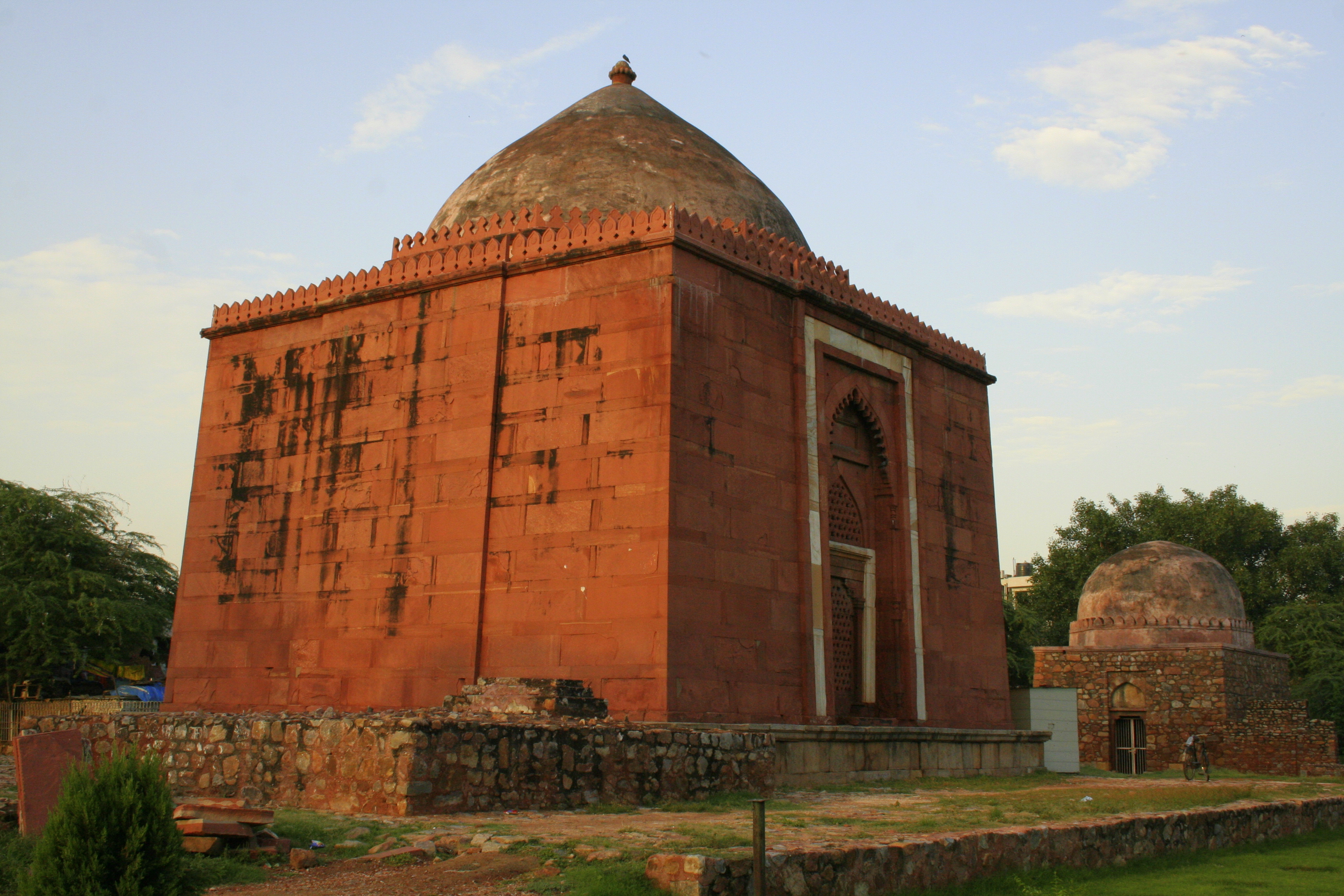
Lal Gumbad, Tomb of Shaikh Kaliruuddin, built in 1397, Malviya Nagar.

Malviya Nagar has two major commercial shopping areas and markets and a speciality hospital. Two of India's biggest and posh malls — Select Citywalk and DLF Avenue (Known as DLF Place earlier) — are located in the neighbourhood. There are several neighbourhood parks that are popular jogging and running areas. A number of monuments from the era of the Delhi Sultanate are located in Malviya Nagar. This includes the tomb of Sufi saint Sheikh Yusuf Qattal who lived during the reign of Ibrahim Lodhi and died in 1526-27.

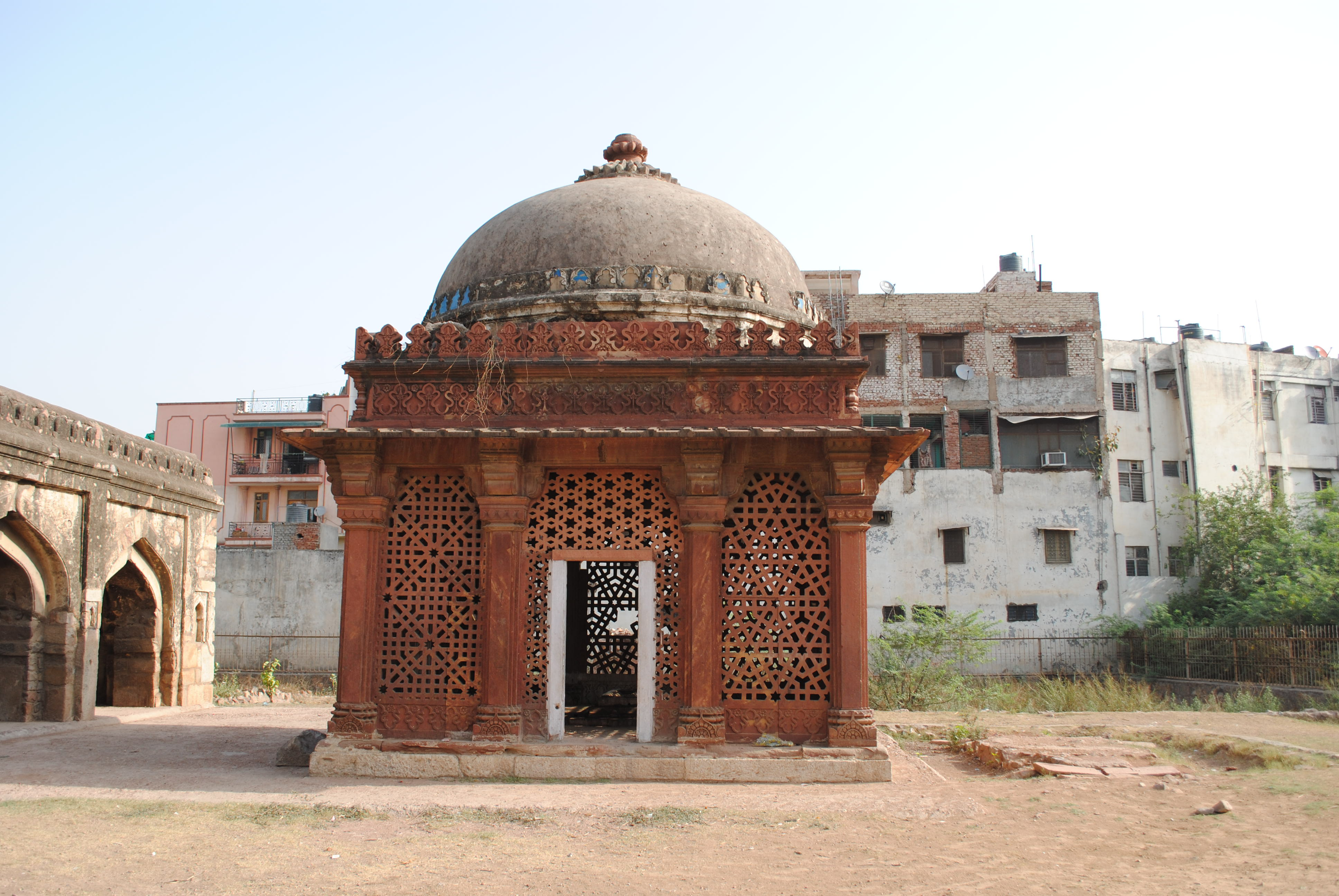
16th-century Tomb of Sufi saint Sheikh Yusuf Qattal near Khirkee.

== Transportation ==
Malviya Nagar is bordered by two major New Delhi thoroughfares; Sri Aurobindo Marg, which is a primary route connecting Connaught Place and Central Delhi to Gurgaon, and the Outer Ring Road. Malviya Nagar is connected by other parts of New Delhi by Delhi Bus Rapid Transit System bus lines. The bus fare ranges from ₹ 5.00 to ₹ 15.00. The buses connecting Malviya Nagar are:

- Route 413: Mehrauli to Nizamuddin, via Khel Gaon and Kranti Marg.
- Route 500: Saket to Shivaji Stadium.
- Route 501: Saket to Mori Gate in North Delhi, via Hauz Khas, Yusuf Sarai and AIIMS.
- Route 503: Malviya Nagar to Mori Gate in North Delhi, via the Main Market and Corner Market, Hauz Khas, Yusuf Sarai and AIIMS.
- Route 512: Ambedkar Nagar via Malviya Nagar, Hauz Khas, etc.
- Route 520: Malviya Nagar to Connaught Place, also via the Main Market and Corner Market, Hauz Khas, Yusuf Sarai, and AIIMS.
- Routes 503 and 520 terminate at Malviya Nagar.

Autorickshaws and taxis are also available for public transportation. There is an auto-rickshaw stand is at the Main Market and the roundabout near Shivalik Gate (which is also the Bus Depot). Saket is a nearby neighbourhood.

The Delhi Metro Yellow Line to Gurgaon is functional and has a station at Malviya Nagar.

== Politics ==
In the MCD, Malviya Nagar (ward 149) is represented by Aam Aadmi Party's Leena Kumar.

Malviya Nagar is a constituency of the Delhi Assembly. Since 2025, the sitting Member of the Assembly has been Satish Upadhyay of the Bharatiya Janata Party.

Malviya Nagar is part of the New Delhi Lok Sabha constituency, currently represented by Member of Parliament Meenakshi Lekhi of the BJP.

Malviya Nagar was also the former residence of Kashmiri separatist leader Syed Ali Shah Geelani, where he lived for 3 months each year during winters in Jammu and Kashmir.
