= Sultanpur, Delhi =

Sultanpur Sultanpur
- Town
- Sultanpur
- Location in India
- Coordinates: 28.49292°N 77.15992°E
- Country: India
- State: Delhi
- District: South
- Seat: Chhatarpur

Government
  - Type: Delhi Government
  - Body: Bjp

Area
  - Total: 1.2 km^{2} (0.46 sq mi)

Population (2011)
  - Total: 15,160
  - Density: 13,000/km^{2} (33,000/sq mi)
- Time zone: UTC+5:30 (IST)
- Postal code: 110030
- Vehicle registration: DL
- Website: www.delhi.gov.in

Sultanpur is a village in South Delhi district of Delhi.

According to the 2011 census, there are 3280 houses, two government schools and three national banks. The metro station (Sultanpur metro station) is 0.6 km away from the village.

"Aa Ab Laut Chale", a film directed by Rishi Kapoor, had principal photography shot at this village in 1999.

== Demographics ==
According to the 2011 India census, Sultan Pur had a population of 15,160. Males constituted 57% of the population and females 43%. Sultan Pur had an average literacy rate of 69%, higher than the national average of 59.5%: male literacy was 75%, and female literacy was 61%. In Sultan Pur, 15% of the population was under 6 years of age.
