= Yellow Line (Delhi Metro) =

Line on the Delhi Metro system

Yellow Line (Line 2)
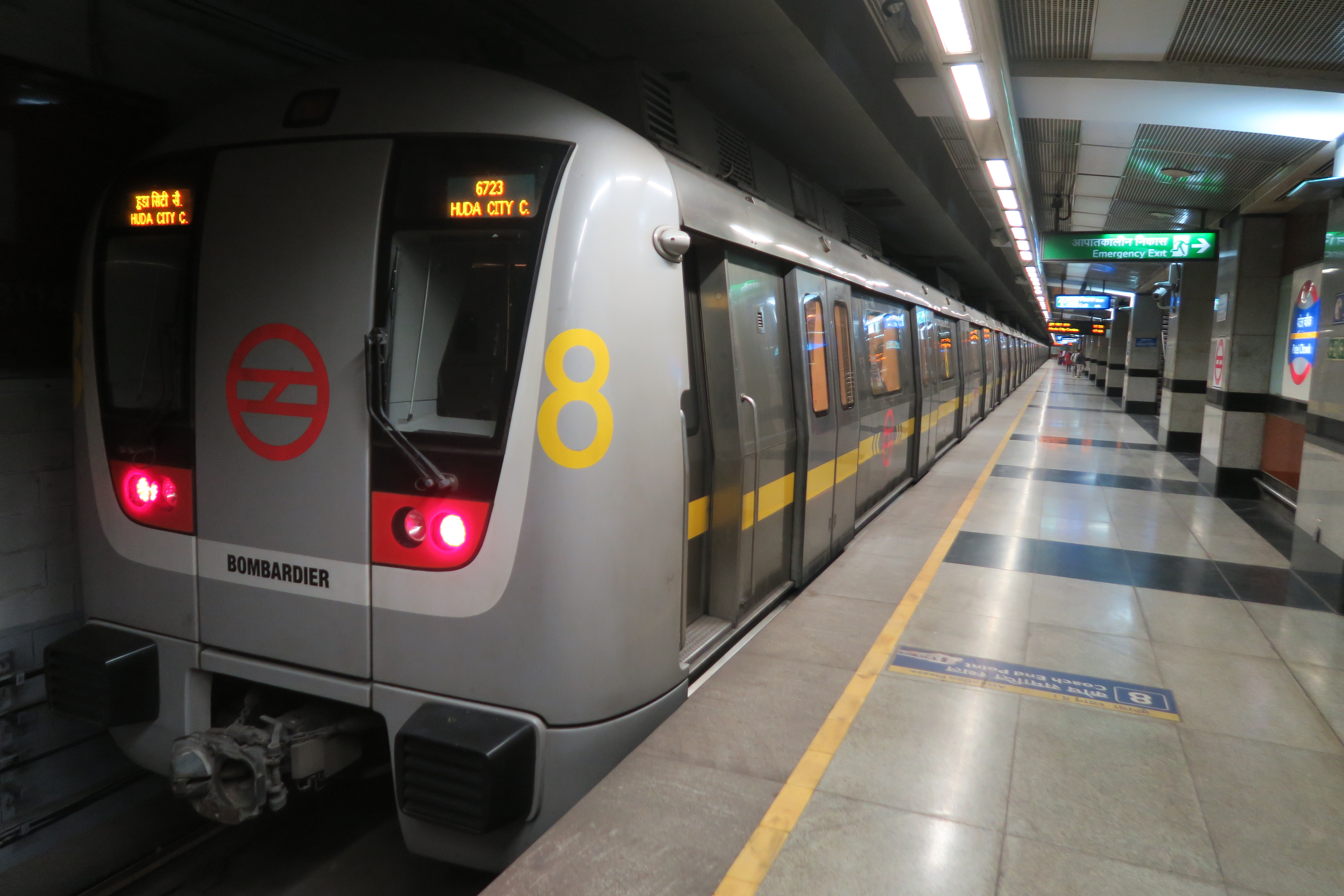
- A Bombardier eight-coach train leaves from Patel Chowk metro station

Overview
- Locale: Delhi, Gurgaon
- Termini: Samaypur Badli; Millennium City Centre Gurugram
- Stations: 37

Service
- Type: Rapid transit
- System: Delhi Metro
- Operator: Delhi Metro Rail Corporation
- Rolling stock: Mitsubishi-Hyundai Rotem; Bombardier MOVIA
- Daily ridership: 1,552,152 (May 2026)

History
- Opened: 20 December 2004; 21 years ago
- Last extension: 10 November 2015

Technical
- Line length: 49.02 km (30.46 mi)
- Character: Underground and Elevated
- Track gauge: 1,676 mm (5 ft 6 in) broad gauge
- Electrification: 25 kV 50 Hz AC from overhead catenary

The Yellow Line (Line 2) is a rapid transit metro line of the Delhi Metro in Delhi, India. It consists of 37 stations from Samaypur Badli in Delhi to Millennium City Centre Gurugram in the neighbouring city of Gurgaon in Haryana. The 49.02 kilometers (30.46 mi) line is mostly underground and laid under one of the most congested parts of Delhi. The Yellow Line is the second line of Delhi Metro to become operational after the Red Line.

It is the 3rd longest metro line on the Delhi Metro network. This line covers North Delhi, through Central Delhi, New Delhi, South Delhi and finally the city of Gurgaon in Haryana. The Yellow line has interchanges with the Red, Blue, Violet, Pink and Magenta lines of the Delhi Metro, as well as with the Old Delhi and New Delhi railway stations of the Indian Railways. The Line also connects with the Airport Express Line at New Delhi metro station. Chawri Bazar metro station is the second deepest station of the Delhi Metro network and is situated about 25 metres (82 ft) below ground level and has 18 escalators.

== History ==
The Vishwavidyalaya to Kashmere Gate section was the first underground section of Delhi Metro to be completed and became operational for public. Prime Minister Manmohan Singh inaugurated this 4 km (2.49 mi) stretch on 19 December 2004.

The following dates represent the dates the section opened to the public, not the private inauguration.

Yellow Line
Phase	Extension date	Termini		Length	Stations
I	20 December 2004	Vishwavidyalaya	Kashmere Gate	4.06 kilometers (2.52 mi)	4
I	3 July 2005	Kashmere Gate	Central Secretariat	6.62 kilometers (4.11 mi)	6
II	4 February 2009	Vishwavidyalaya	Jahangirpuri	6.38 kilometers (3.96 mi)	5
II	21 June 2010	Millennium City Centre Gurugram	Qutab Minar	15.82 kilometers (9.83 mi)	9
II	26 August 2010	Chhatarpur		–	1
II	3 September 2010	Central Secretariat	Qutab Minar	11.76 kilometers (7.31 mi)	9
III	10 November 2015	Jahangirpuri	Samaypur Badli	4.38 kilometers (2.72 mi)	3
Total		Samaypur Badli	Millennium City Centre Gurugram	49.02 kilometers (30.46 mi)	37

== Stations ==
Yellow Line
#	Station Name		Phase	Opening	Interchange Connection	Station Layout	Platform Level Type
#	English	Hindi	Phase	Opening	Interchange Connection	Station Layout	Platform Level Type
1	Samaypur Badli	समयपुर बादली	III	10 November 2015	Badli and Red Line Narela SECTOR A-7 (DDA Sports Complex)	Elevated	Side
2	Rohini Sector 18, 19	रोहिणी सेक्टर 18, 19	III	10 November 2015	None	Elevated	Side
3	Haiderpur Badli Mor	हैदरपुर बादली मोड़	III	10 November 2015	Magenta Line	Elevated	Island
4	Jahangirpuri	जहांगीरपुरी	II	4 February 2009	None	Elevated	Side
5	Adarsh Nagar	आदर्श नगर	II	4 February 2009	Adarsh Nagar	Elevated	Side
6	Azadpur	आज़ादपुर	II	4 February 2009	Pink Line; Magenta Line (Phase IV – Under Construction)	Elevated	Side
7	Model Town	मॉडल टाउन	II	4 February 2009	None	Elevated	Side
8	Guru Tegh Bahadur Nagar	गुरु तेग बहादुर नगर	II	4 February 2009	None	Underground	Side
9	Vishwavidyalaya	विश्वविद्यालय	I	20 December 2004	None	Underground	Side
10	Vidhan Sabha	विधान सभा	I	20 December 2004	None	Underground	Side
11	Civil Lines	सिविल लाइन्स	I	20 December 2004	None	Underground	Side
12	Kashmere Gate	कश्मीरी गेट	I	20 December 2004	Red Line; Violet Line; Kashmere Gate ISBT	Underground	Island
13	Chandni Chowk	चाँदनी चौक	I	3 July 2005	Delhi Junction	Underground	Island
14	Chawri Bazar	चावड़ी बाज़ार	I	3 July 2005	None	Underground	Island
15	New Delhi	नई दिल्ली	I	3 July 2005	Airport Express; Magenta Line (Phase V(A) – Approved); New Delhi	Underground	Island
16	Rajiv Chowk	राजीव चौक	I	3 July 2005	Blue Line	Underground	Island
17	Patel Chowk	पटेल चौक	I	3 July 2005	None	Underground	Island
18	Central Secretariat	केन्द्रीय सचिवालय	I	3 July 2005	Violet Line; Magenta Line (Phase V(A) – Approved)	Underground	Side
19	Seva Teerth	सेवा तीर्थ	II	3 September 2010	None	Underground	Island
20	Lok Kalyan Marg	लोक कल्याण मार्ग	II	3 September 2010	None	Underground	Island
21	Jor Bagh	जोर बाग़	II	3 September 2010	None	Underground	Island
22	Dilli Haat – INA	दिल्ली हाट - आईएनए	II	3 September 2010	Pink Line	Underground	Island
23	AIIMS	एम्स	II	3 September 2010	None	Underground	Island
24	Green Park	ग्रीन पार्क	II	3 September 2010	None	Underground	Island
25	Hauz Khas	हौज़ ख़ास	II	3 September 2010	Magenta Line	Underground	Island
26	Malviya Nagar	मालवीय नगर	II	3 September 2010	None	Underground	Island
27	Saket	साकेत	II	3 September 2010	None	Underground	Island
28	Qutab Minar	क़ुतुब मीनार	II	21 June 2010	None	Elevated	Side
29	Chhatarpur	छत्तरपुर	II	26 August 2010	Golden Line (Phase IV – Under Construction)	Elevated	Side
30	Sultanpur	सुल्तानपुर	II	21 June 2010	None	Elevated	Side
31	Ghitorni	घिटोरनी	II	21 June 2010	None	Elevated	Side
32	Arjan Garh	अरजन गढ़	II	21 June 2010	None	Elevated	Side
33	Guru Dronacharya	गुरु द्रोणाचार्य	II	21 June 2010	None	Elevated	Side
34	Sikanderpur	सिकन्दरपुर	II	21 June 2010	Rapid Metro	Elevated	Side
35	MG Road	एम जी रोड	II	21 June 2010	None	Elevated	Side
36	IFFCO Chowk	इफको चौक	II	21 June 2010	None	Elevated	Side
37	Millennium City Centre Gurugram	मिलेनियम सिटी सेंटर गुरुग्राम	II	21 June 2010	None	Elevated	Side

== Train info ==
Yellow Line
Rakes	Mitsubishi	Hyundai Rotem	BEML	Bombardier
Train Length	8			
Train Gauge	1,676 mm (5 ft 6 in) broad gauge			
Electrification	25 kV 50 Hz AC (nominal) from overhead catenary			
Train's Maximum Speed	100 km/h			
Train Operation	Samaypur Badli - Millenium City Centre Gurugram Vishwavidyalaya - Millenium City Centre Gurugram			

== Future extensions ==
In the Phase-V of the Yellow Line of Delhi Metro will be extended to the following:

- Samaypur Badli to Khera Kalan: From existing Samaypur Badli metro station to Khera Kalan in North Delhi via a proposed station at Siraspur has been proposed. A detailed project report (DPR) was prepared in 2024.

== See also ==
- Transport in Delhi
- List of Delhi Metro stations
