= Samaypur Badli metro station =

Metro station in Delhi, India

Samaypur Badli

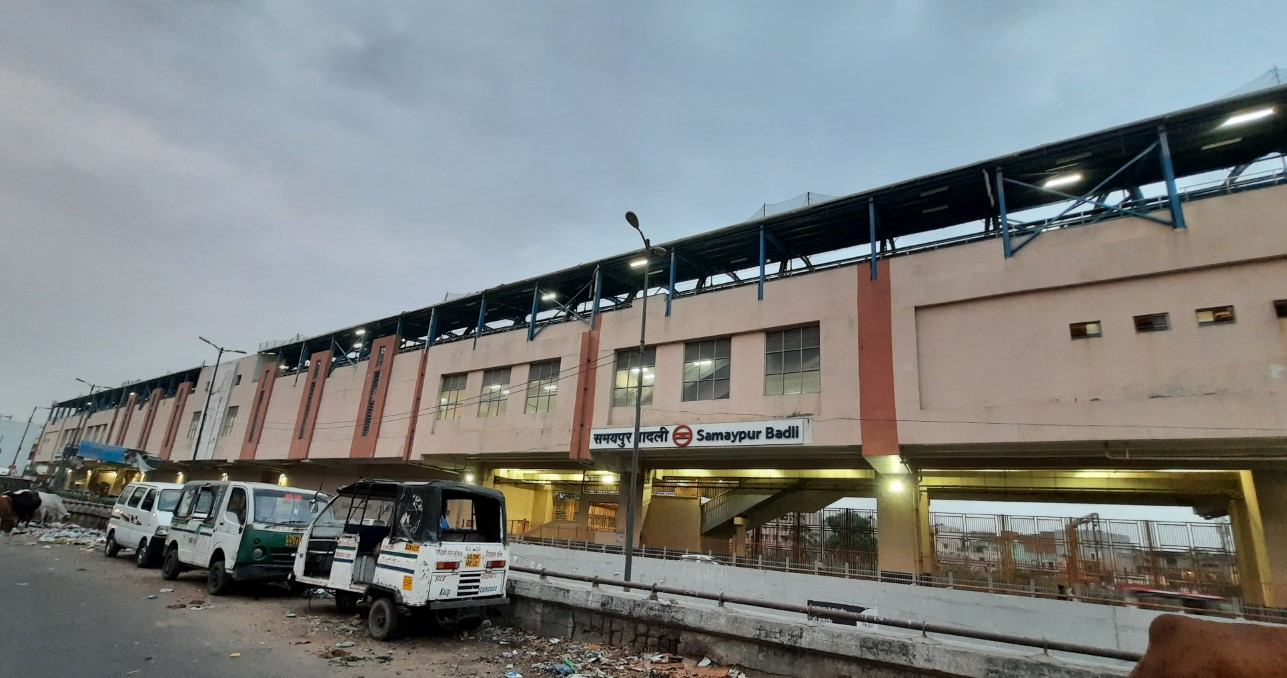

General information
- Location: Bawana Rd, Pocket G, Suraj Park, Phase 1, Samaypur Badli, Sector 18, Rohini, Delhi, 110042
- Coordinates: 28°44′42″N 77°08′16″E
- System: Delhi Metro station
- Owner: Delhi Metro
- Operator: Delhi Metro Rail Corporation (DMRC)
- Line: Yellow Line
- Platforms: Side platform; Platform-1 → Millennium City Centre Gurugram; Platform-2 → Train Terminates
- Tracks: 2
- Connections: Badli

Construction
- Structure type: Elevated, Double-track
- Platform levels: 2
- Accessible: Yes

Other information
- Status: Staffed, Operational
- Station code: SPBI

History
- Opened: 10 November 2015; 11 years ago
- Electrified: 25 kV 50 Hz AC through overhead catenary

Services
Preceding station	Delhi Metro	Following station
Terminus	Yellow Line	Rohini Sector 18, 19 towards Millennium City Centre Gurugram
Track layout
Location

Samaypur Badli is an elevated metro station and the northern terminal of the Yellow Line of the Delhi Metro. It is located in Samaypur Badli, near Sector 18 of Rohini, North-West Delhi. The station commenced commercial operations on 10 November 2015 as part of the 4.37 kilometres (2.72 mi) Jahangirpuri–Samaypur Badli extension, developed under Phase III of the Delhi Metro expansion.

== The station ==
=== Station layout ===
L2	Side platform | Doors will open on the left
L2	Platform 1 Southbound	Towards → Millennium City Centre Gurugram; Next Station: Rohini Sector 18, 19
L2	Platform 2 Northbound	Towards ← Train Terminates Here
L2	Side platform | Doors will open on the left
L1	Concourse	Fare control, station agent, Metro Card vending machines, crossover
G	Street Level	Exit/Entrance

== Entry/exit ==
Samaypur Badli metro station entry/exits
Gate No-1	Gate No-3
Badli Railway Station	FOB Badli Railway Station

== Connections ==
=== Bus ===
Delhi Transport Corporation bus routes number 106A, 165, 165A, 879A serves the station from nearby Samaypur Badli bus stop.

== See also ==
- Badli
- List of Delhi Metro stations
- Transport in Delhi
- Delhi Metro Rail Corporation
- Delhi Suburban Railway
- Delhi Transport Corporation
- North Delhi
- National Capital Region (India)
- List of rapid transit systems
- List of metro systems
