= Millennium City Centre Gurugram metro station =

Metro station in Gurgaon, Haryana, India

Millennium City Centre Gurugram

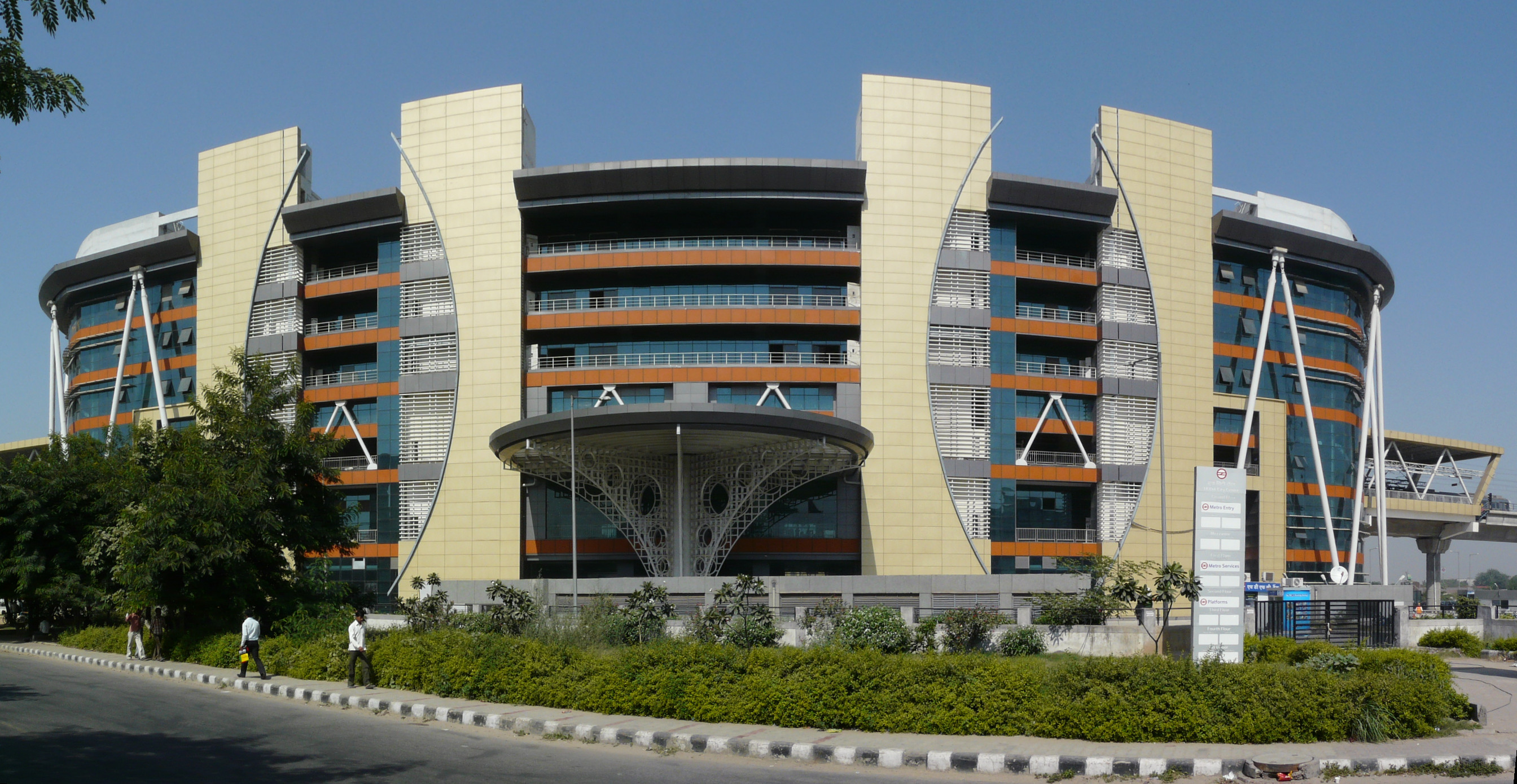

General information
- Location: Sector 29, Gurugram, Haryana 122007; India
- Coordinates: 28°27′33″N 77°04′21″E
- System: Delhi Metro station
- Owner: Delhi Metro
- Operator: Delhi Metro Rail Corporation (DMRC)
- Line: Yellow Line
- Platforms: Side platform; Platform-1 → Train Terminates Here; Platform-2 → Samaypur Badli
- Tracks: 2

Construction
- Structure type: Elevated, Double-track
- Platform levels: 2
- Parking: Available
- Accessible: Yes

Other information
- Status: Staffed, Operational
- Station code: HCC

History
- Opened: 21 June 2010; 16 years ago
- Electrified: 25 kV 50 Hz AC through overhead catenary

Passengers
- Jan 2015: 42,989/day 1,332,644/ Month average

Services
Preceding station	Delhi Metro	Following station
IFFCO Chowk towards Samaypur Badli	Yellow Line	Terminus
Route map
Location

Millennium City Centre Gurugram, formerly and widely known as HUDA City Centre, is a terminal station on the Yellow Line of Delhi Metro. It is an elevated station and is located in Gurugram, Haryana in the National Capital Region of India. The station was inaugurated on 21 June 2010 as part of the Qutab Minar—HUDA City Centre corridor.

== Station layout ==
L2	Side platform | Doors will open on the left
L2	Platform 1 Southbound	Towards → Train Terminates Here
L2	Platform 2 Northbound	Towards ← Samaypur Badli; Next Station: IFFCO Chowk
L2	Side platform | Doors will open on the left
L1	Concourse	Fare control, station agent, Metro Card vending machines, crossover
G	Street Level	Exit/Entrance

=== Facilities ===
List of available ATM at Millennium City Centre Gurugram metro station are HDFC Bank, Yes Bank, State Bank of India, IndusInd Bank

== Entry/Exit ==
Millennium City Centre metro station - Entry/Exits
Gate No-1	Gate No-2	Gate No-3	Gate No-4
Fortis Hospital	Fortis Hospital	Unitech Business Park	Max Hospital

== Nearby Colleges and University ==
College and University	Location
The Northcap University, Gurugram	Huda, Sector 23A, Near Rotary Public School, Gurugram, 122017
DPG Institute of Technology & Management	Sector - 34, Gurgaon, Haryana 122001
Gurugram University, Gurugram	Campus Rao Tula Ram College of Commerce and Science. Mayfield Garden, Sector 51, Gurugram, Haryana 122003

== Gallery ==
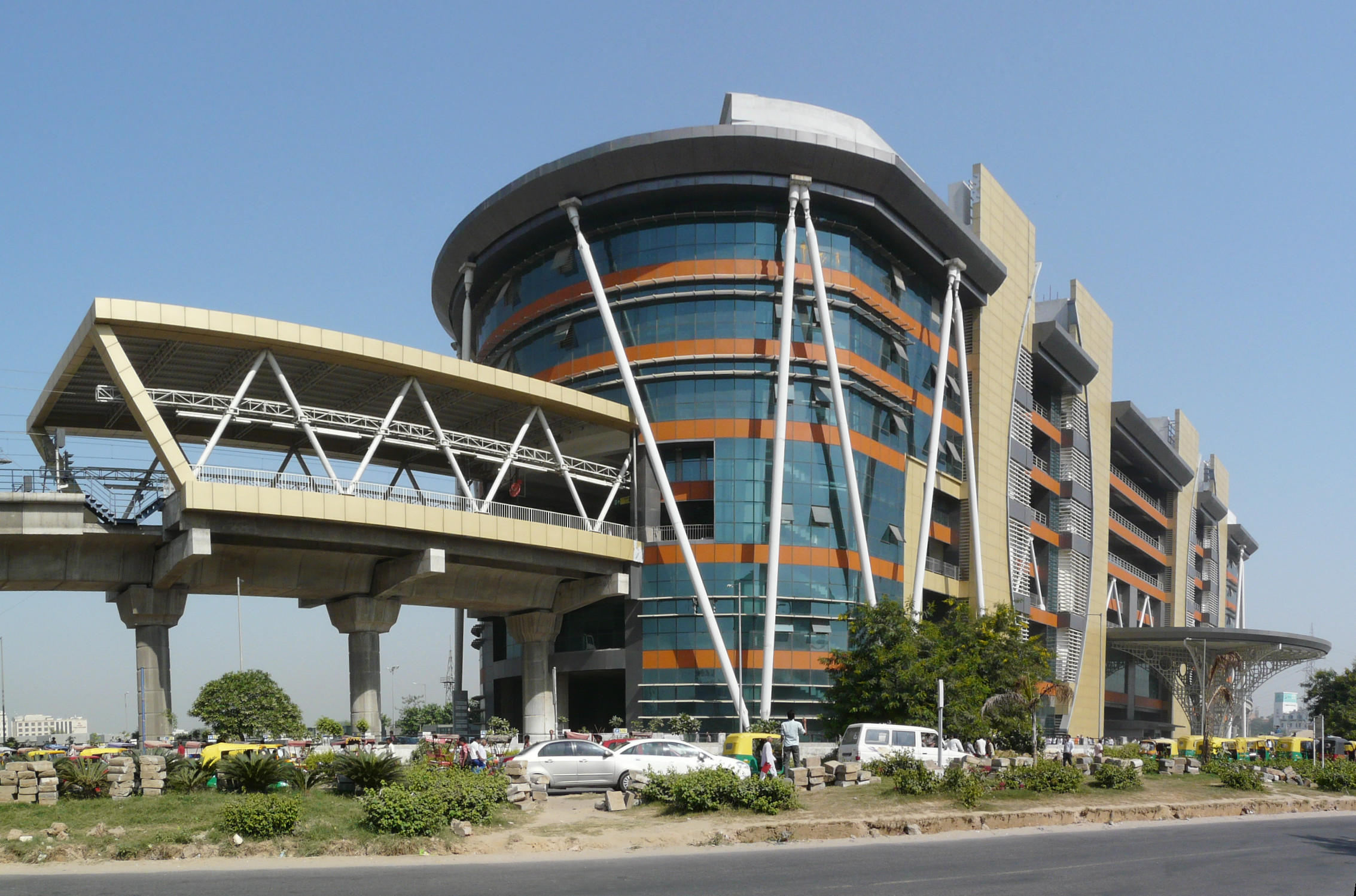

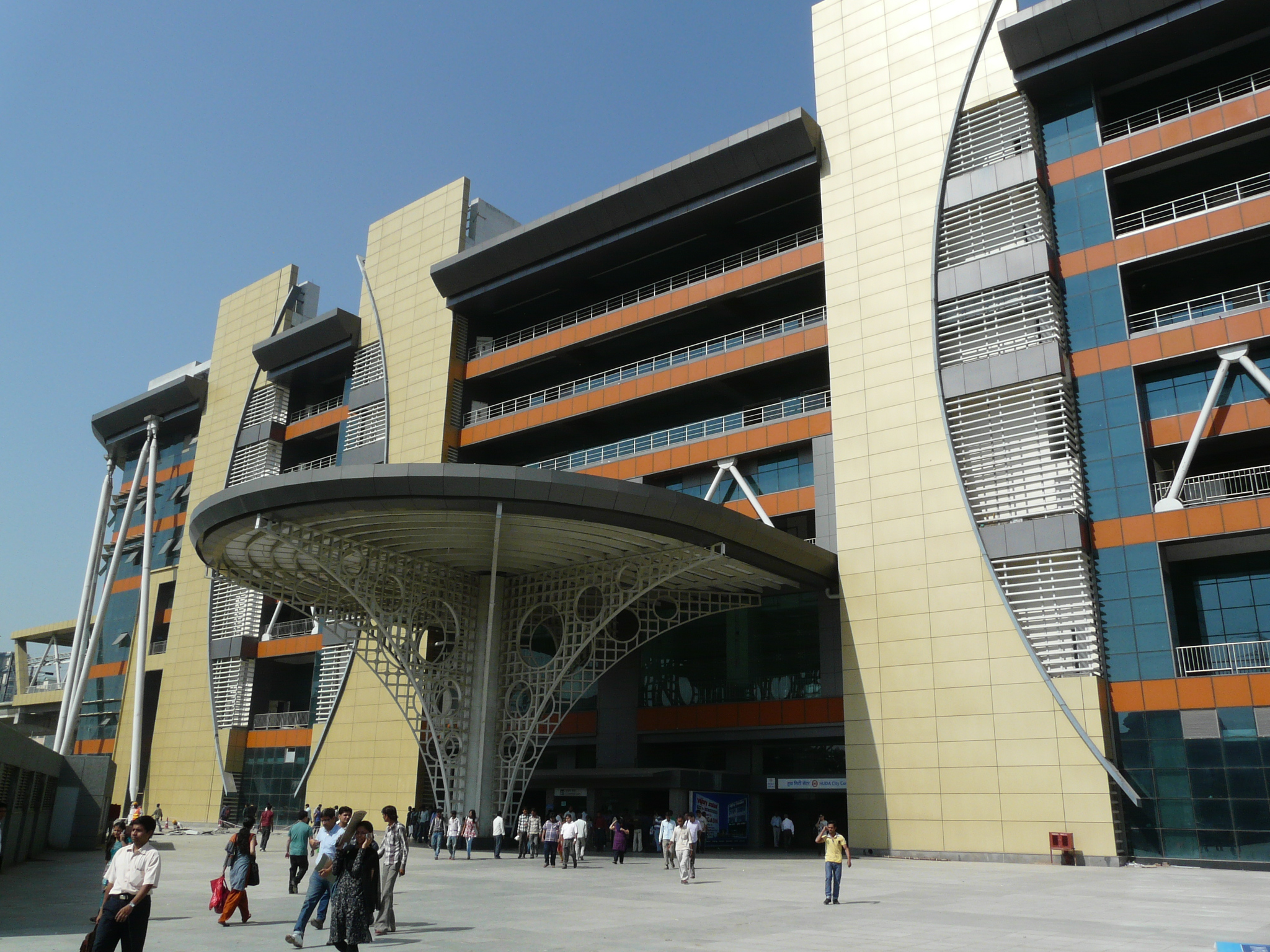
Station entrance

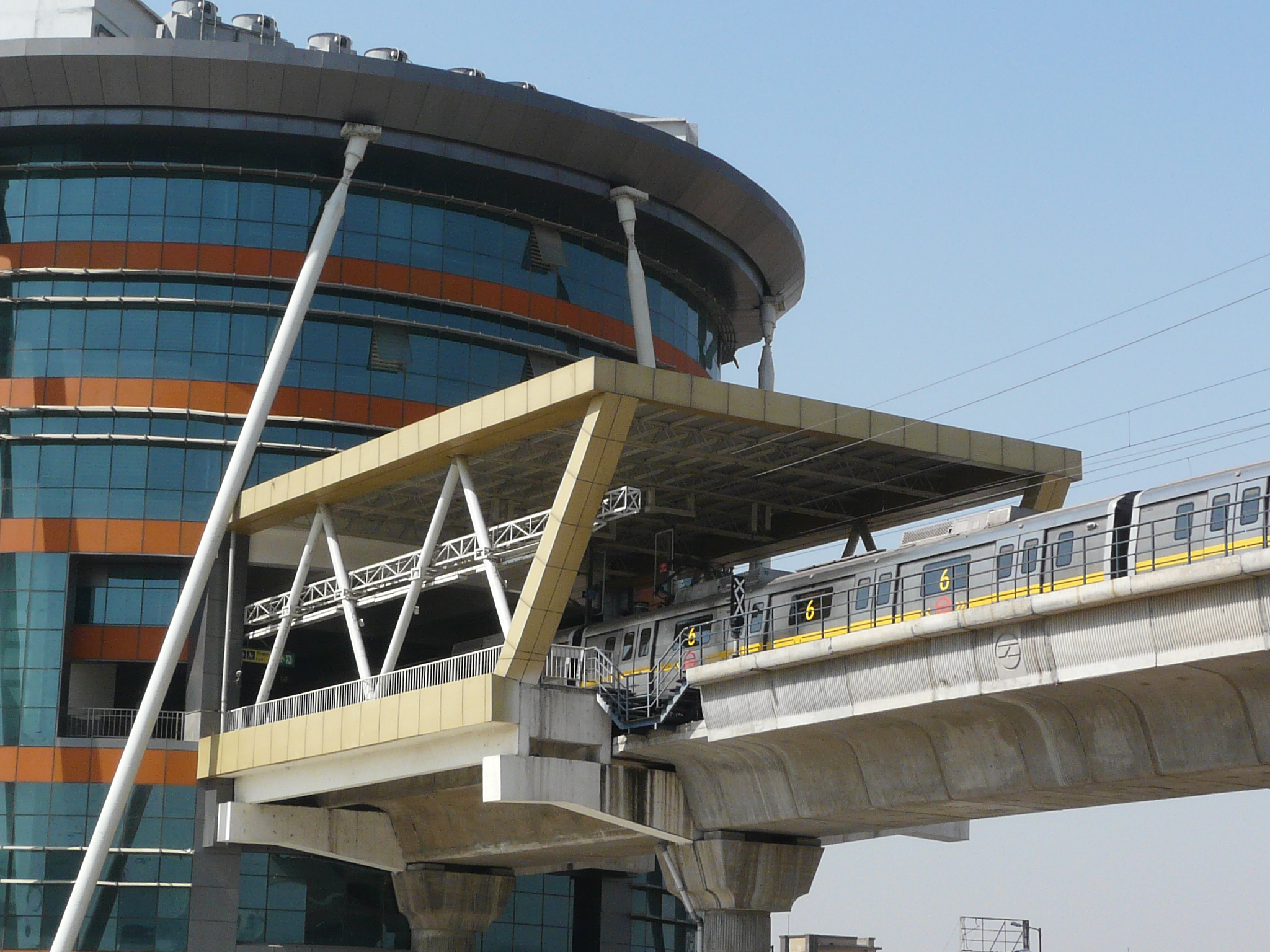
Metro train entering the station

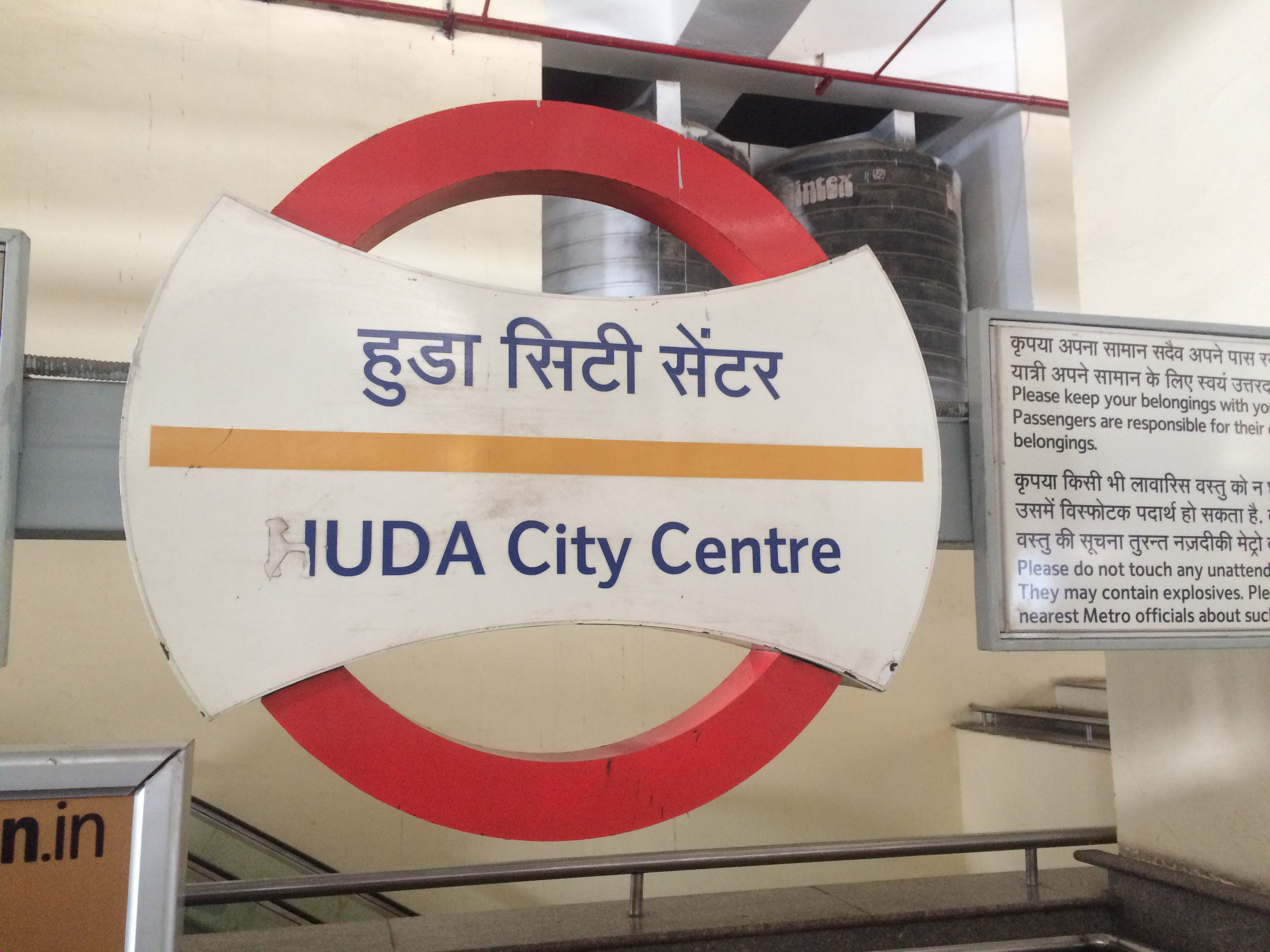
Platform board

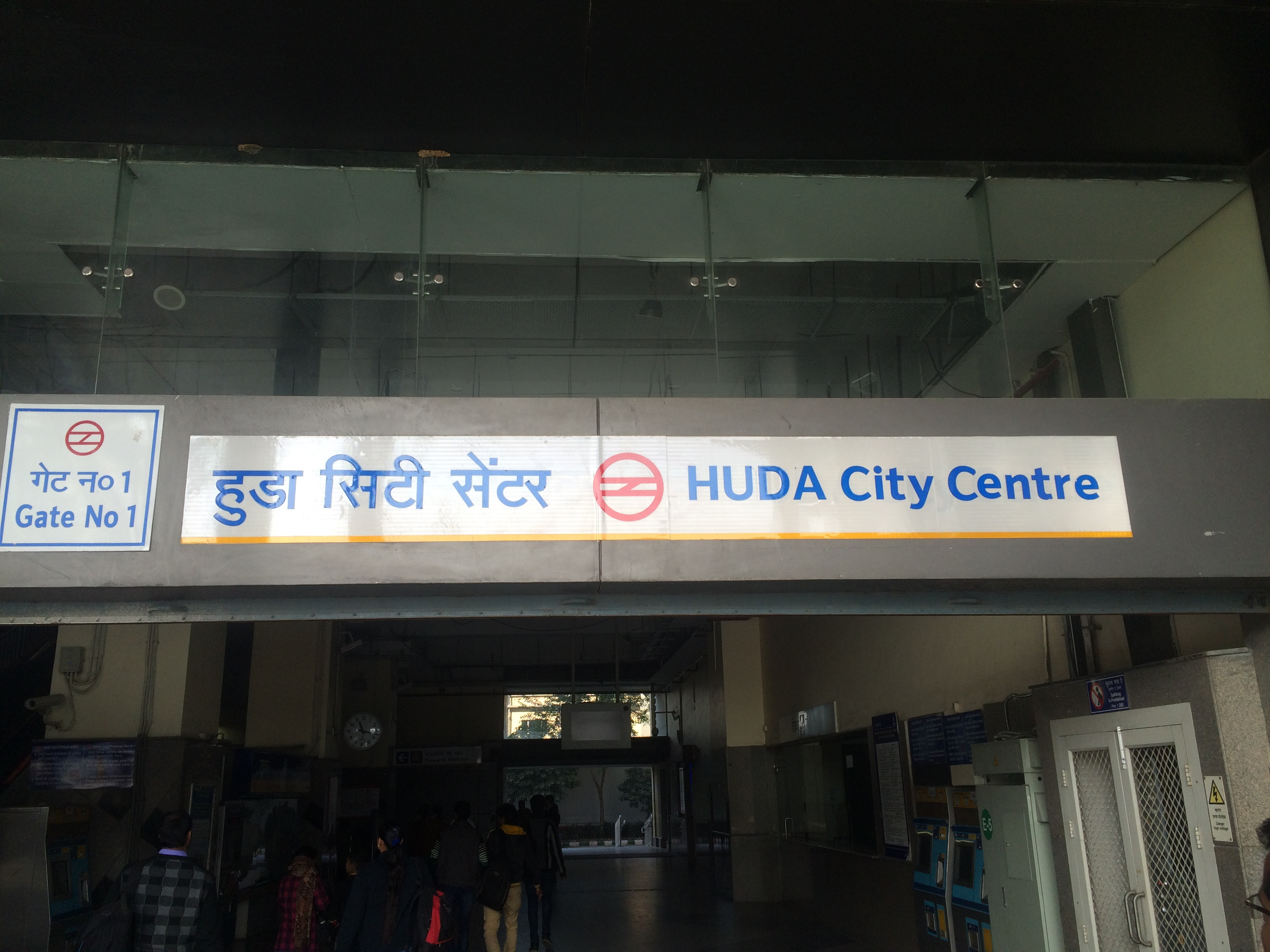
Entrance

== See also ==
- Haryana
- Gurgaon
- List of Delhi Metro stations
- Transport in Delhi
- Delhi Metro Rail Corporation
- Delhi Suburban Railway
- Delhi Monorail
- Delhi Transport Corporation
- South East Delhi
- National Capital Region (India)
- List of rapid transit systems
- List of metro systems
