= Delhi Metro =

Rapid transit system in India serving Delhi NCR

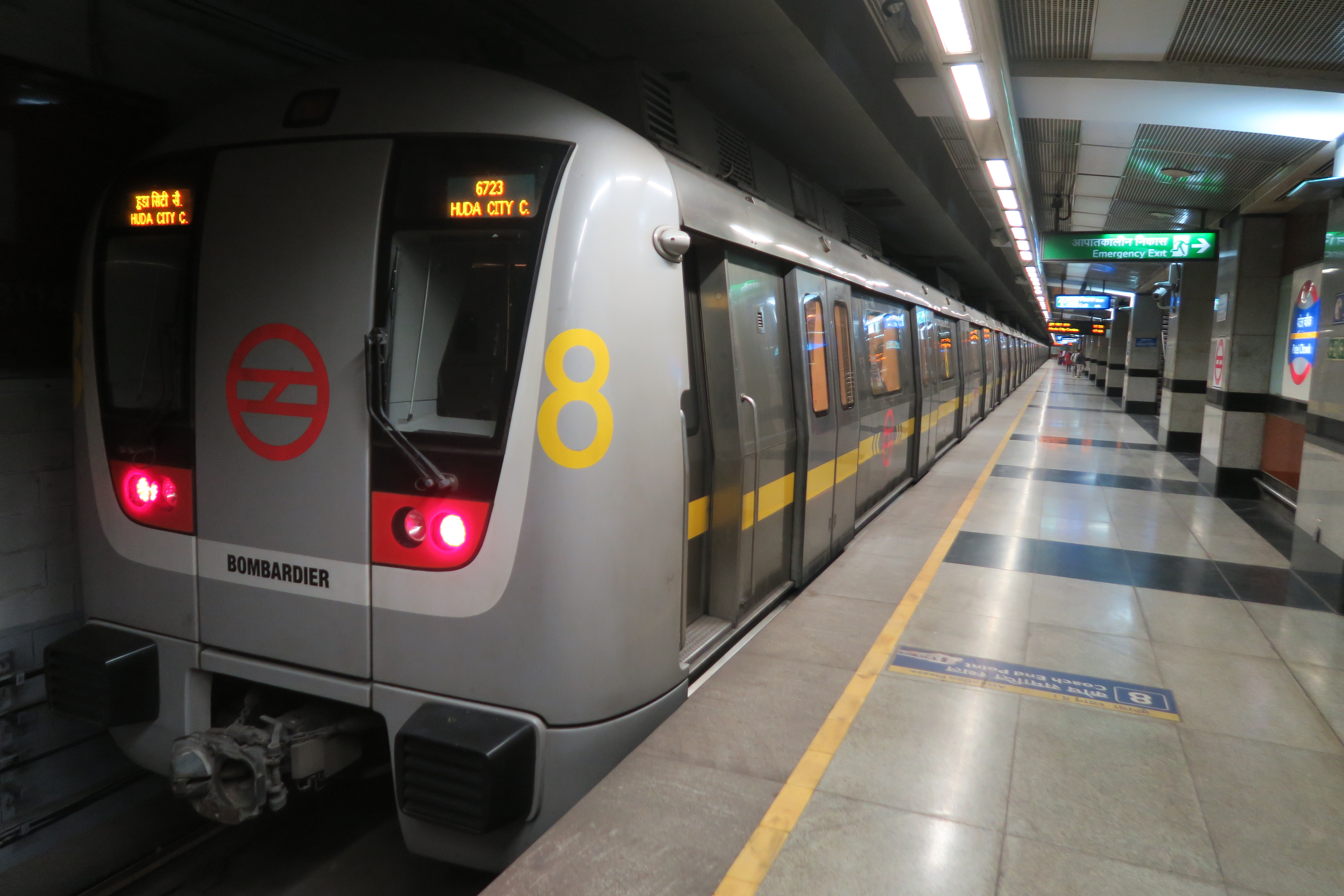

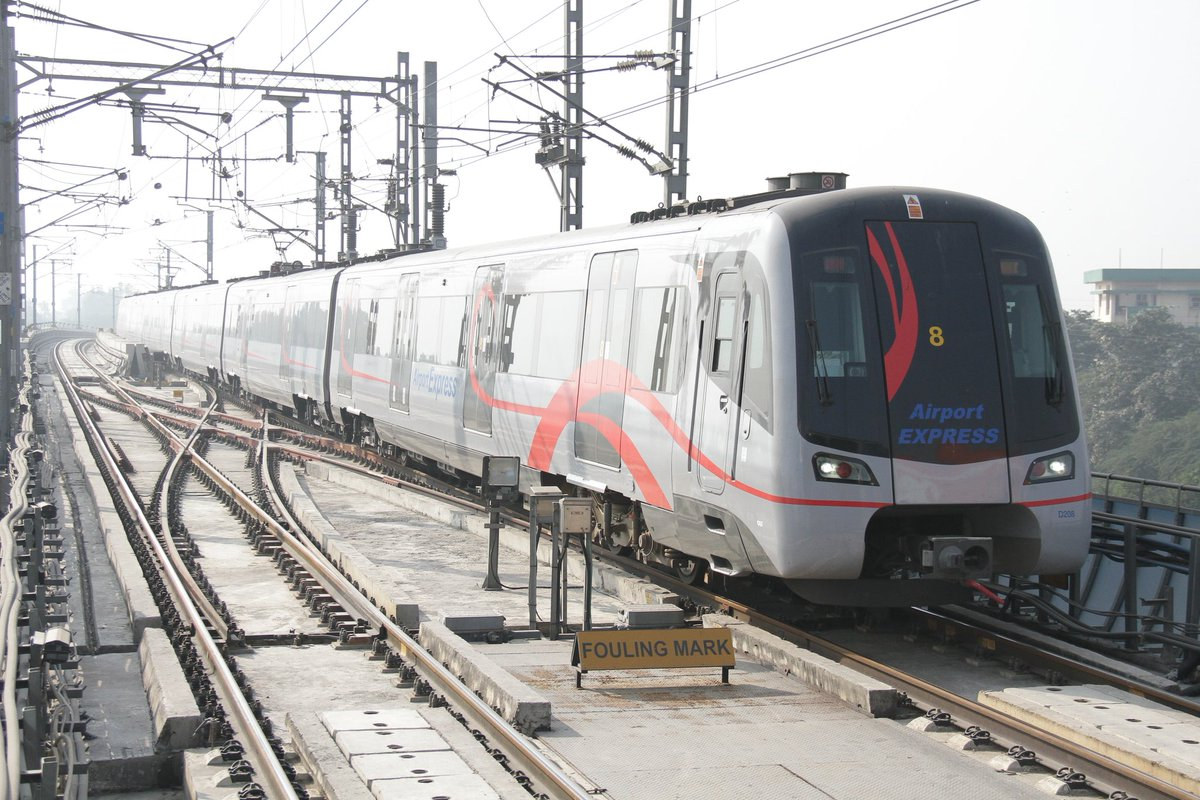
- Top: A Yellow Line train at Patel Chowk metro station. Bottom: An Airport Express Line train.

Overview
- Owner: Delhi Metro Rail Corporation
- Locale: National Capital Region (NCR)
- Transit type: Rapid transit
- Number of lines: 10
- Line number: Red Line; Yellow Line; Blue Line; Green Line; Violet Line; Airport Express; Pink Line; Magenta Line; Grey Line; Golden Line — Upcoming
- Number of stations: 271 (Note: Transfer stations are counted more than once. There are 27 transfer stations, 26 double transfers and 1 triple transfer. If transfer stations are counted once, the result is 243 stations. Ashok Park Main station, where the two branches of the Green Line share tracks and platforms, is counted as one station. Noida Metro and Gurgaon Metro stations are not counted; if they were, the result would be 303 stations.)
- Daily ridership: 64.6 lakh (6.46 million, 2025)
- Annual ridership: 235 crore (2.35 billion, 2025) (Note: Based on line utilisation, which counts transit lines used for a single journey.)
- Key people: Katikithala Srinivas (Chairman); Vikas Kumar (Managing Director)
- Headquarters: Metro Bhawan, Barakhamba Road, New Delhi
- Website: delhimetrorail.com

Operation
- Began operation: 24 December 2002; 23 years ago
- Operator: Delhi Metro Rail Corporation
- Number of vehicles: 350 trains
- Train length: 4/6/8 coaches
- Headway: 2 minutes

Technical
- System length: 374.47 km (232.68 mi) (Note: The Delhi Metro's own network length is 374.47 km. The Gurgaon Metro and Noida Metro are operated and maintained by the Delhi Metro Rail Corporation, and the total length operated by the DMRC is 416.49 kilometres (258.79 mi).)
- Track gauge: 1,676 mm (5 ft 6 in) broad gauge (Red, Blue and Yellow lines); 1,435 mm (4 ft 8 1/2 in) standard gauge (Other lines)
- Electrification: 25 kV 50 Hz AC from overhead catenary
- Average speed: 45 km/h (28 mph)
- Top speed: 120 km/h (75 mph)
System map
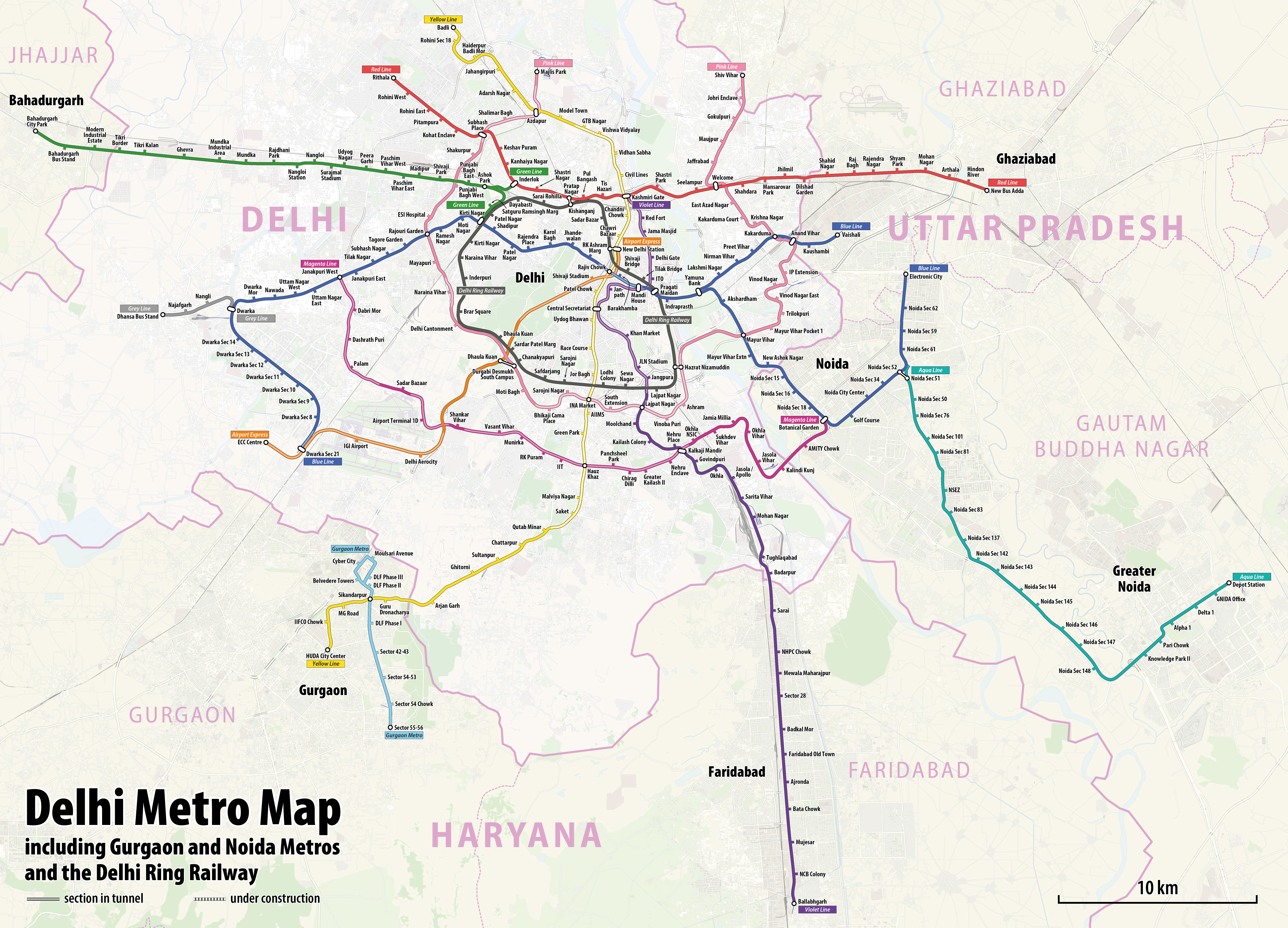

The Delhi Metro is a rapid transit system that serves Delhi and the adjoining satellite cities of Faridabad, Gurugram, Ghaziabad, Noida, Bahadurgarh, and Ballabhgarh in the National Capital Region of India. The system consists of 10 colour-coded lines serving 271 stations, with a total length of 374.466 km (232.682 mi). It is India's largest and busiest metro rail system. The metro has a mix of underground, at-grade, and elevated stations using broad-gauge and standard-gauge tracks. The metro makes over 4,300 trips daily.

Construction began in 1998, and the first elevated section (Shahdara to Tis Hazari) on the Red Line opened on 25 December 2002. The first underground section (Vishwavidyalaya to Kashmere Gate on the Yellow Line) opened on 20 December 2004. The network was developed in phases. Phase I was completed by 2006, followed by Phase II in 2011. Phase III was mostly complete by 2021, except for a small extension of the Airport Line, which opened in 2023. Work on Phase IV began on 30 December 2019.

The Delhi Metro Rail Corporation (DMRC), a joint venture between the Government of India and the Government of Delhi, built and operates the Delhi Metro. The DMRC was certified by the United Nations in 2011 as the first metro rail and rail-based system in the world to receive carbon credits for reducing greenhouse-gas emissions, reducing annual carbon emission levels in the city by 630,000 tonnes.

The Delhi Metro has interchanges with the Rapid Metro Gurgaon (via a shared ticketing system) and the Noida Metro. On 22 October 2019, the DMRC took over operations of the financially troubled Rapid Metro Gurgaon. The Delhi Metro's annual ridership was 235.8 crore (2.35 billion) in 2025. The system also has interchanges with the Delhi-Meerut RRTS, India's fastest urban regional transit system.

== History ==
=== Background ===
Evolution of the Delhi Metro from 2003 to 2018

The concept of mass rapid transit for New Delhi first emerged from a 1969 traffic and travel characteristics study in the city. Over the next several years, committees in a number of government departments were commissioned to examine issues related to technology, route alignment, and governmental jurisdiction. In 1984, the Urban Arts Commission proposed the development of a multi-modal transport system which would build three underground mass rapid transit corridors and augmenting the city's suburban railway and road transport networks.

The city expanded significantly while technical studies and financing for the project were underway, doubling its population and increasing the number of vehicles five-fold between 1981 and 1998. Traffic congestion and pollution soared as an increasing number of commuters used private vehicles, and the existing bus system was unable to bear the load. A 1992 attempt to privatise the bus transport system compounded the problem, with inexperienced operators plying poorly maintained, noisy and polluting buses on lengthy routes; this resulted in long waiting times, unreliable service, overcrowding, unqualified drivers, and speeding and reckless driving which led to road accidents. The Government of India under Prime Minister H.D. Deve Gowda, and the Government of Delhi set up the Delhi Metro Rail Corporation (DMRC) on 3 May 1995, with Elattuvalapil Sreedharan its managing director. Mangu Singh succeeded Sreedharan as DMRC managing director on 31 December 2011.

== Construction Phases ==
=== Initial construction ===
When the project was originally approved by the Union Cabinet in September 1996, it had three corridors. In 1997, official development assistance loans from Japan were granted to finance and conduct the first phase of the system.

Construction of the Delhi Metro began on 1 October 1998. To avoid problems that plagued Kolkata Metro, which witnessed substantial delays and ran 12 times over budget due to "political meddling, technical problems and bureaucratic delays", the DMRC was created as a special-purpose vehicle vested with autonomy and power to execute the large project which involved many technical complexities in a challenging urban environment within a limited time frame. Putting the central and state governments on an equal footing gave an unprecedented level of autonomy and freedom to the company, which had full powers to hire people, decide on tenders, and control funds. The DMRC hired the Hong Kong MTRC as a technical consultant on rapid-transit operation and construction techniques. Construction proceeded smoothly except for a major disagreement in 2000, when the Ministry of Railways forced the system to use 5 ft 6 in (1,676 mm) broad gauge despite the DMRC's preference for standard gauge. This decision led to an additional capital expenditure of ₹260 crore (US$28 million).

The Delhi Metro's first line, the Red Line, was inaugurated by Prime Minister Atal Bihari Vajpayee on 24 December 2002. The metro became India's second underground rapid transit system, after the Kolkata Metro, when the Vishwavidyalaya–Kashmere Gate section of the Yellow Line opened on 20 December 2004. The underground line was inaugurated by Prime Minister Manmohan Singh. The project's first phase was completed in 2006, on budget and almost three years ahead of schedule, an achievement described by Business Week as "nothing short of a miracle".

=== Phase I ===
A 64.75 kilometer (40.23 miles) network of 59 stations was constructed in Delhi, encompassing the initial sections of the Red, Yellow, and Blue Lines. The stations were opened to the public between 25 December 2002 and 11 November 2006. The total cost for Phase I was ₹10,571 crore (equivalent to ₹370 billion or US$4.0 billion in 2026).

Phase 1 Network
No.	Line	Stations	Length (km)	Terminals		Opening date
1	Red Line	6	8.35	Shahdara	Tis Hazari	25 December 2002
1	Red Line	4	4.87	Tis Hazari	Inderlok	3 October 2003
1	Red Line	8	8.84	Inderlok	Rithala	31 March 2004
2	Yellow Line	4	4.06	Vishwavidyalaya	Kashmere Gate	20 December 2004
2	Yellow Line	6	6.62	Kashmere Gate	Central Secretariat	3 July 2005
3	Blue Line	22	22.74	Dwarka-Kakrola	Barakhamba Road	31 December 2005
3	Blue Line	6	6.47	Dwarka-Kakrola	Dwarka Sector 9	1 April 2006
3	Blue Line	3	2.80	Barakhamba Road	Indraprastha	11 November 2006
Total		59	64.75			

=== Phase II ===
A total of 123.3-kilometre-long (76.6 mi) network of 86 stations and 10 routes and extensions was built. Seven routes were extensions of the Phase I network, three were new colour-coded lines, and three routes connect to other cities (the Yellow Line to Gurgaon and the Blue Line to Noida and Ghaziabad) of the National Capital Region in the states of Haryana and Uttar Pradesh. Upon the conclusion of Phases I and II, the network's total length was 188.05 km (116.85 mi) and 145 stations became operational between 4 June 2008 and 27 August 2011. The total cost for Phase II was ₹18,783 crore (equivalent to ₹420 billion or US$4.5 billion in 2026).

Phase 2 network
No.	Line	Stations	Length (km)	Terminals		Opening date
1	Red Line	3	2.86	Shahdara	Dilshad Garden	4 June 2008
2	Yellow Line	5	6.38	Vishwavidyalaya	Jahangirpuri	4 February 2009
2	Yellow Line	9	15.82	Millennium City Centre Gurugram	Qutab Minar	21 June 2010
2	Yellow Line	1	15.82	Chhatarpur		26 August 2010
2	Yellow Line	9	11.76	Qutab Minar	Central Secretariat	3 September 2010
3	Blue Line	1	2.17	Indraprastha	Yamuna Bank	10 May 2009
3	Blue Line	10	12.85	Yamuna Bank	Noida City Centre	12 November 2009
3	Blue Line	2	2.28	Dwarka Sector 9	Dwarka Sector 21	30 October 2010
4	Blue Line Branch	6	6.25	Yamuna Bank	Anand Vihar	6 January 2010
4	Blue Line Branch	2	2.26	Anand Vihar	Vaishali	14 July 2011
5	Green Line	14	14.19	Inderlok	Mundka	3 April 2010
5	Green Line	2	3.41	Ashok Park Main	Kirti Nagar	27 August 2011
6	Violet Line	13	15.34	Central Secretariat	Sarita Vihar	3 October 2010
6	Violet Line	3	4.82	Sarita Vihar	Badarpur Border	14 January 2011
-	Airport Express	4	22.91	New Delhi	Dwarka Sector 21	23 February 2011
-	Airport Express	2	22.91	Dhaula Kuan & Delhi Aerocity		15 August 2011
Total		86	123.30			

=== Phase III ===
Phase I (Red, Yellow and Blue Lines) and Phase II (Green, Violet, and Airport Express Lines) focused on adding radial lines to expand the network. To further reduce congestion and improve connectivity, Phase III included eight extensions to existing lines, two ring lines (the Pink and Magenta Lines) and the Grey Line. It has 28 underground stations, three new lines and seven route extensions, totaling 162.375 kilometres (100.895 mi), at a cost of ₹410.079 billion (US$4.4 billion). The three new Phase III lines are the Pink Line on Inner Ring Road (Line 7), the Magenta Line on Outer Ring Road (Line 8) and the Grey Line connecting Dwarka and Najafgarh (Line 9). The total cost for Phase III was ₹48,565.12 crore (equivalent to ₹590 billion or US$6.4 billion in 2026).

Phase 3 network
No.	Line	Stations	Length (km)	Terminals		Opening date
1	Red Line	8	9.64	Dilshad Garden	Shaheed Sthal (New Bus Adda)	9 March 2019
2	Yellow Line	3	4.37	Jahangirpuri	Samaypur Badli	10 November 2015
3	Blue Line	6	6.80	Noida City Centre	Noida Electronic City	9 March 2019
5	Green Line	7	11.19	Mundka	Brigadier Hoshiyar Singh	24 June 2018
5	Green Line	1	–	Punjabi Bagh West		29 March 2022
6	Violet Line	2	3.23	Mandi House	Central Secretariat	26 June 2014
6	Violet Line	1	0.97	Mandi House	ITO	8 June 2015
6	Violet Line	9	13.56	Badarpur Border	Escorts Mujesar	6 September 2015
6	Violet Line	4	5.07	Kashmere Gate	ITO	28 May 2017
6	Violet Line	2	3.35	Escorts Mujesar	Raja Nahar Singh (Ballabhgarh)	19 November 2018
-	Airport Express	1	2.01	Dwarka Sector 21	Yashobhoomi - Dwarka Sector 25	17 September 2023
7	Pink Line	12	21.57	Majlis Park	Durgabai Deshmukh South Campus	14 March 2018
7	Pink Line	6	8.53	Durgabai Deshmukh South Campus	Lajpat Nagar	6 August 2018
7	Pink Line	15	17.86	Trilokpuri - Sanjay Lake	Shiv Vihar	31 October 2018
7	Pink Line	5	9.63	Lajpat Nagar	Shree Ram Mandir Mayur Vihar	31 December 2018
7	Pink Line	0	1.65	Shree Ram Mandir Mayur Vihar	Trilokpuri - Sanjay Lake	6 August 2021
8	Magenta Line	9	12.64	Kalkaji Mandir	Botanical Garden	25 December 2017
8	Magenta Line	16	24.82	Janakpuri West	Kalkaji Mandir	29 May 2018
9	Grey Line	3	4.30	Dwarka-Kakrola	Najafgarh	4 October 2019
9	Grey Line	1	0.89	Najafgarh	Dhansa Bus Stand	18 September 2021
Total		111	162.375			

Work on Phase III began in 2011, with 2016 as the planned deadline. Over 20 tunnel-boring machines were used simultaneously to expedite construction, which was completed in March 2019 (except for a small stretch due to the non-availability of land). Short extensions were later added to Phase III, which was expected to be completed by the end of 2020, but construction was delayed due to the COVID-19 pandemic. It was completed on 18 September 2021 with the opening of the Grey Line extension from Najafgarh to Dhansa Bus Stand. An extension of the Airport Line to Yashobhoomi Dwarka Sector -25 metro station was later added, and it was completed on 17 September 2023.

Driverless operations on the 38-kilometre-long (24 mi) Magenta Line began on 28 December 2021, making it the Delhi Metro's (and India's) first driverless metro line. On 25 November 2021, the 59-kilometre-long (37 mi) Pink Line also began driverless operations. The total driverless DMRC network is nearly 97 km (60 mi), putting Delhi Metro in fourth position globally among such networks, behind Kuala Lumpur.

The expected daily ridership of the network after the completion of Phase III was estimated at 53.47 lakh passengers. Actual DMRC ridership was 27.79 lakh in 2019–20, 51.97 percent of the projected ridership. Actual ridership of the Phase III corridors was 4.38 lakh, compared with a projected ridership of 20.89 lakh in 2019–20 (a deficit of 79.02 percent). The communication-based train control (CBTC) on Phase III trains enables them to run at a 90-second headway, although the actual headway between trains is higher because of the relatively low demand on the new corridors. Keeping the short headway and other constraints in mind, DMRC changed its decision to build nine-car-long stations for new lines and opted for shorter stations, which can accommodate six-car trains.

=== Phase IV ===
Phase IV, with a length of 112.415 km (69.851 mi) and six lines, was finalized by the Government of Delhi in December 2018. Approval from the government of India was received for three priority corridors in March 2019. Construction of the corridors 65.1 km (40.5 mi) began on 30 December 2019, with an expected completion date of 2026. The metro's total length will exceed 450 kilometres (280 mi) at the end of Phase IV, not including other independently operated systems in the National Capital Region such as the 29.7-kilometre-long (18.5 mi) Aqua Line of the Noida-Greater Noida Metro and the 11.7-kilometre (7.3 mi) Rapid Metro Gurgaon which connect to the Delhi Metro.

Phase IV network
No.	Line	Stations	Length (km)	Terminals		Status	Expected completion date	Opening date
7	Pink Line	7	12.32	Majlis Park	Maujpur - Babarpur	Completed		8 March 2026
7	Pink Line	1	12.32	Soorghat		Under Construction	2027	
8	Magenta Line	1	1.8	Janakpuri West	Krishna Park Extension	Completed		5 January 2025
8	Magenta Line	7	9.9	Deepali Chowk	Majlis Park	Completed		8 March 2026
8	Magenta Line	6	17.53	Krishna Park Extension	Deepali Chowk	Under Construction	2027	
8	Magenta Line	8	17.53	Majlis Park	RK Ashram Marg	Under Construction	2027	
8	Magenta Line	10	12.38	Inderlok	Indraprastha	Under Construction	2030	
10	Golden Line	15	23.62	Delhi Aerocity	Tughlakabad	Under Construction	2027	
11	Golden Branch Line	8	8.4	Lajpat Nagar	Saket G-Block	Under Construction	2030	
1	Red Line	21	26.46	Rithala	Kundli	Approved	2030	
Total		84	112.427					

=== Phase V ===
On 3 May 2026 the Government of Delhi approved Phase V (B), seven corridors totalling 97.158 km (60.371 mi) with 65 stations at an estimated cost of ₹48,204 crore (US$5.1 billion); the project was sent to the Union Government for approval, with four corridors targeted for completion by 2029.

The 9.913 km (6.160 mi) underground R.K. Ashram Marg – Indraprastha extension of the Magenta Line will have stations at Shivaji Stadium, Yuge Yugeen Bharat, Central Secretariat, Kartavya Bhawan, India Gate, War Memorial–High Court, Baroda House and Bharat Mandapam.

Phase V (A) network
No.	Line	Stations	Length (km)	Terminals		Status	Expected completion date
8	Magenta Line	8	9.913	R K Ashram Marg	Indraprastha	Centre Approved	2028
10	Golden Line	3	3.9	Tughlakabad	Kalindi Kunj	Under Construction	2028
10	Golden Line	1	2.263	Delhi Aerocity	Terminal 1 IGI Airport	Centre Approved	2028
Total		12	16.076				
Phase V (B) network
9	New Line	9	11.859	Dhansa Bus Stand	Nangloi	State Approved	TBD
New Line	New Line	10	15.969	Central Secretariat	Kishangarh	State Approved	TBD
2	Yellow Line	8	12.89	Samaypur Badli	Narela DDA Sports Complex	State Approved	TBD
5	Green Line	6	9.967	Kirti Nagar	Palam	State Approved	TBD
New Line	New Line	12	16.991	Jor Bagh	Mithapur (Faridabad border)	State Approved	TBD
New line	New Line	8	13.197	Mayur Vihar Phase III	Shastri Park	State Approved	TBD
New Line	New Line	12	16.285	Keshav Puram	Rohini Sector 34	State Approved	TBD
Total		65	97.158				
Phase V (C) network
-	Airport Express Line	7	17.5	Yashobhoomi Dwarka Sector - 25	Subhash Chowk Gurugram	Proposed	TBD
1	Red Line	2	3	Shaheed Sthal (New Bus Adda)	Ghaziabad Railway Station	Proposed	TBD
3	Blue Line	5	5.1	Noida Electronic City	Sahibabad	Proposed	TBD
4	Blue Line	5	5.04	Vaishali	Mohan Nagar	Proposed	TBD
New line	New Line	7	12	Mayapuri	Kashmere Gate	Proposed	TBD
3	Blue Line	3	11	Dwarka Sector 21	Udyog Vihar	Proposed	TBD
7	Pink Line	8	12	Gokulpuri	Arthala	Proposed	TBD
New Line	New Line	10	15	Tughlakabad	Noida Sector 142	Proposed	TBD
6	Violet Line	13	24	Raja Nahar Singh	Palwal	Proposed	TBD
5	Green Line	6	8	Brigadier Hoshiyar Singh	Asaudha	Proposed	TBD
Total		66	112.64				
Grand Total Phase V (A + B + C)		143	225.876				

=== Incidents ===
On 19 October 2008, a launching gantry, part of the overhead Blue Line extension under construction in Laxmi Nagar, collapsed and fell on a passing bus. Workers were using a crane to lift a 400-tonne concrete span of the bridge when the gantry and a 34-metre-long (112 ft) span of the bridge collapsed on the bus. The driver and a construction worker were killed.

On 12 July 2009, a section of a bridge collapsed while it was being erected at Zamrudpur, east of Kailash, on the Central Secretariat – Badarpur corridor. Six people died and 15 were injured. A crane removing the debris collapsed the following day and collapsed two other nearby cranes, injuring six. On 22 July 2009, a worker at the Ashok Park Metro station was killed when a steel beam fell on him. Over a hundred people, including 93 workers, have died since work on the metro began in 1998.

On 23 April 2018, five people were injured when an iron girder fell off the elevated section of a Metro structure under construction at the Mohan Nagar intersection in Ghaziabad. A car, an auto rickshaw, and a motorbike were also damaged in the incident.

On 8 February 2024, a portion of the Gokulpuri metro station's boundary wall collapsed and fell on the road below, killing 1 person and injuring 4 others. In the wake of this accident, DMRC replaced the side walls of five elevated stations on the Pink Line with stainless steel railings.

== Expansion ==
=== Delhi ===
==== Delhi Metro Expansion Phase-V ====
Former DMRC managing director E. Sreedharan stated that by the time Phase IV is completed, the city will require Phase V to cope with increased population and transport needs. Following extensions are planned as part of Phase-V.

- Blue Line Metro: Yamuna Bank to Loni
  From the existing Yamuna Bank metro station, the Blue Line will be further extended 12 km (7.5 mi) to Loni on the Delhi-Ghaziabad border in Phase-V. See also Delhi Pink Line: Shiv Vihar-Loni extension below.
- Central Vista Loop Line (4 stations, including 1 existing)
  As part of Central Vista Redevelopment Project, this underground line with 4 stations, including the existing Central Secretariat metro station interchange of existing Yellow Line and Violet Line, will connect the new government buildings currently undergoing development as part of the project.
- Yellow Line: Samaypur Badli to Khera Kalan extension (3 stations, 2 new and 1 existing)
  From the existing Samaypur Badli metro station, an extension to Khera Kalan in North Delhi via a proposed station at Siraspur has been floated. This extension will have 2 new stations, Khera Kalan and Siraspur. A detailed project report (DPR) was prepared in 2024.
- Delhi Airport Air Train (IGI APM).
  It is a proposed automated people mover (APM) at Indira Gandhi International Airport (IGI Airport), which will consist of 4 airside and 1 external station, namely Terminal T1 air side station, Aerocity Business Park outside air side station, Aerocity air side station, Cargo Terminal outside air side station, T2&T3 air side station.

=== Haryana ===
==== Bahadurgarh ====
Bahadurgarh or Rohtak do not have own separate metro network, these cities in Haryana state are or will be connected to Delhi by the Delhi Metro.

- Delhi Green Line Metro: Bahadurgarh to Asaudha (studies and DPR done): from the existing Bahadurgarh (Brigadier Hoshiyar Singh metro station) to Asaudha (Asaudah railway station) has been approved, where it will interchange with Haryana Orbital Rail Corridor.
- Delhi Green Line Metro: Asaudha to Rohtak (studies done): further extension to Rohtak city.

==== Faridabad ====
Faridabad and Palwal do not have own separate metro network, these cities in Haryana state are or will be connected to Delhi by Delhi Metro Violet Line.

- Faridabad-Gurugram link (studied and DPR done): see below in Gurugram section.
- Delhi-Palwal extension (studied and DPR done): extension of Delhi Metro Violet Line.
- Palwal-Noida Airport extension (no studied done or approved): extension of Delhi Metro Violet Line.

==== Gurugram ====
Gurugram has its own separate light metro network called the Rapid Metro Gurgaon, with several extensions planned.

===== Inter-city links =====
- Faridabad-Gurugram link (studies and DPR done): from the existing Bata Chowk metro station on Delhi Metro Violet Line to Gurugram Vatika Chowk".

- Gurugram-IGI Airport link (studies and DPR done): from the Rezang La Chowk in Gurugram to the existing Delhi Orange Line Yashobhoomi Dwarka Sector 25 station for the IGI Airport.
- Gurugram-Southeast Delhi link (no studies done or approved): from Vatika Chowk on SPR in southeast Gurugram to Mehrauli in southeast Delhi, not yet approved and no studies done yet.

===== Intra-city links =====
- Gurugram Metro Loop (studies and DPR done): from the existing Millennium City Centre Gurugram metro station to existing Cyber City station. In March 2025, Haryana invited tenders to begin civil construction of 15 km section from Millennium City metro station to Sector 9 metro station.
  - North–south link or Old Gurugram Metro (studies and DPR done): from Kapashera to Manesar-Panchgaon (Pachgaon to integrate with RRTS station and WPE).
  - Southwest-South link, 17 km, DPR underway: from Gurgaon railway station, Rajiv Chowk, Vatika Chowk on SPR (Souther Peripheral Road), and Bhondsi, will connect to Metro extension from Millennium City Centre metro station at the Gurugram railway station and Delhi-Gurugram-Alwar RRTS line at Rajiv Chowk. In March 2025, Haryana invited tenders to hire consultant to prepare DPR for this route.
  - East–west link (no studies done or approved): from Gurugram Golf Course Extension Road to Gurugram Sector 5 along Sheetla Mata Road, with stations at Millennium City Centre Gurugram metro station (existing), Signature Tower crossing, Rana Pratap Chowk, and Atul Kataria Chowk. In March 2025, Haryana invited tenders to hire consultant to prepare DPR for this route.

==== Jhajjhar ====
Jhajjhar does not have own separate metro network, this city in Haryana state will be connected to Delhi in future by extension to the Delhi Metro.

- Delhi Grey Line Metro Phase-V: Dhansa-Jhajjhar extension (studies done): Delhi Metro Grey Line from the existing Dhansa Bus Stand in Najafgarh to Jhajjar City via Badli.
- Gurugram-Jhajjhar Metro (no studies done or approved): as extension of Gurugram Metro via Badsa AIIMS and Badli.

==== Sonipat ====
Sonipat does not have own separate metro network, Sonepat city in Haryana state will be connected to Delhi in future through extensions to the Delhi Metro in the following two phases:

- Red Line Phase-IV Rithala-Narela-Nathupur extension (under-construction).
- Red Line Phase-V Nathupur-Sector7 extension (studies done):

=== Uttar Pradesh ===
==== Ghaziabad ====
Following are the extensions of Delhi Metro as Ghaziabad does not have separate Metro network.

- Delhi Pink Line: Shiv Vihar-Loni extension, from Shiv Vihar to Loni extension as part of Phase-V. See also Delhi Blue Line Metro: Yamuna Bank to Loni above.
- Delhi Pink Line: Gokulpuri-Hindon Airport-Arthala extension, 13 km link from the existing Gokulpuri metro station of pink Line to the west Ghaziabad (existing Arthala metro station of Red Line metro) via Hindon Airport.

==== Noida ====
Noida has own separate network called Noida Metro, which connects to the Delhi Metro.

- Noida Aqua Line: Sector 51 - Knowledge Park-V extension.
- Noida Airport-Greater Noida Sector 142 PRT
- Greater Noida-Noida Airport Metro: from the existing Noida Sector 148 metro station on Noida Aqua Line to Noida International Airport.
- Ballabhgarh-Noida Airport Metro: From Ballabhgarh metro station on Delhi Metro Violet Line to Palwal and Jewar Airport.

=== Integration with RRTS ===
Delhi RRTS system, a RapidX "Regional Rapid Transit System" (RRTS) which aims to connect Delhi with its neighbouring cities via eight lines of semi-high-speed trains operating at a maximum speed of 160 km/h (99 mph). Phase I of the project consists of three corridors: Delhi–Meerut, Delhi–Alwar, and Delhi–Panipat corridor. The Delhi–Meerut corridor, also known as the Delhi–Meerut RRTS, operated by the National Capital Region Transport Corporation (NCRTC), was rendered full operational in 2026.

The Delhi–Meerut RRTS is 82.15 km (51.05 mi) long and costs ₹30,274 crore (US$3.2 billion). It comprises 14 stations (with nine additional stations for the Meerut Metro) and two depots. Three of the 14 stations (Sarai Kale Khan, New Ashok Nagar, and Anand Vihar) are in Delhi, and have seamless integration with the Delhi Metro.

== Lines ==
=== Map ===
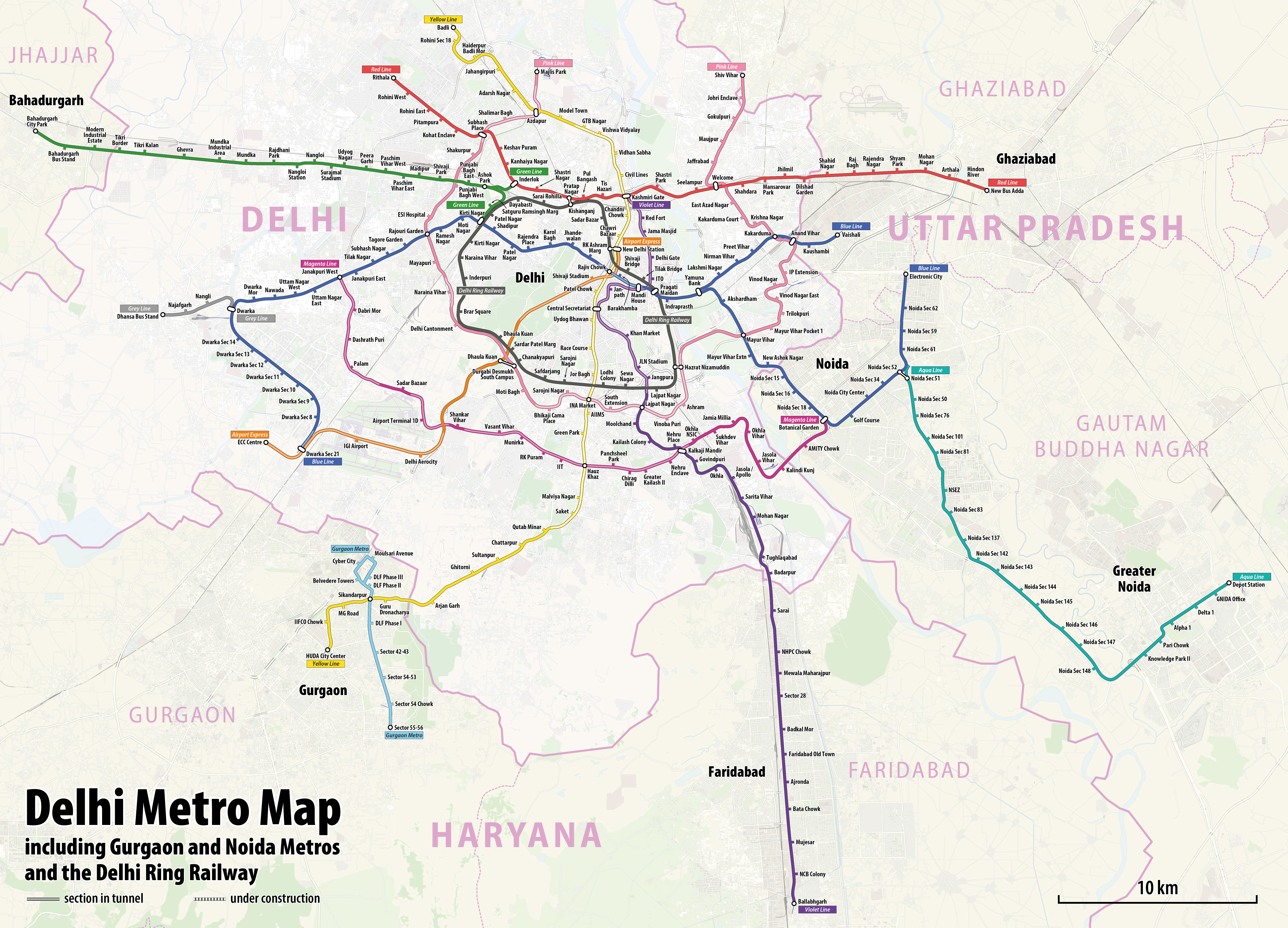
Map of the Delhi Metro, 2021

=== Red Line (Line 1) ===
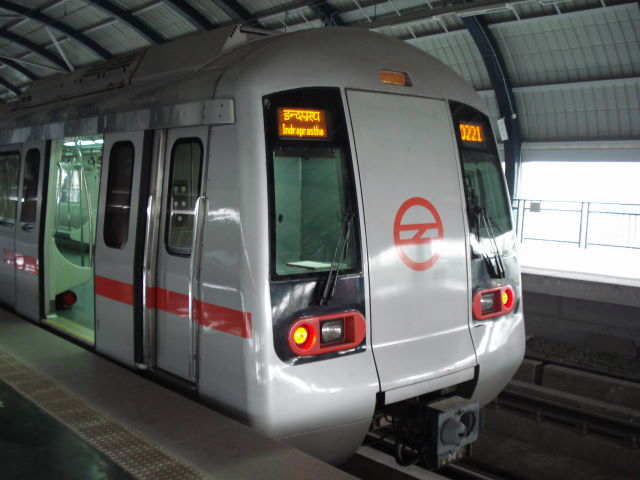
Older rolling stock used by the DMRC on Line 1. Most of the stock running on Lines 2, 3, and 4 are planned to be sent to Line 1.

The Red Line, the first metro line opened, connects Rithala in the west to Shaheed Sthal (New Bus Adda) in the east for a distance of 34.55 kilometres (21.47 mi). Partly elevated and partly at grade, it crosses the Yamuna River between the Kashmere Gate and Shastri Park stations. The opening of the first stretch on 24 December 2002, between Shahdara and Tis Hazari, crashed the ticketing system due to demand. Subsequent sections were opened from Tis Hazari – Trinagar (later renamed Inderlok) on 4 October 2003, Inderlok – Rithala on 31 March 2004, and Shahdara – Dilshad Garden on 4 June 2008. The Red Line has interchanges at Kashmere Gate with the Yellow and Violet Lines, at Inderlok with the Green Line, and at Netaji Subhash Place and Welcome with the Pink Line, and at Madhuban Chowk with the Magenta Line. An interchange with the Blue Line at Mohan Nagar is planned. Six-coach trains were commissioned on the line on 24 November 2013. An extension from Dilshad Garden to Shaheed Sthal (New Bus Adda) opened on 8 March 2019. The metro introduced a set of two eight-coach trains on the Red Line, converted from the existing fleet of 39 six-coach trains, in November 2022.

=== Yellow Line (Line 2) ===
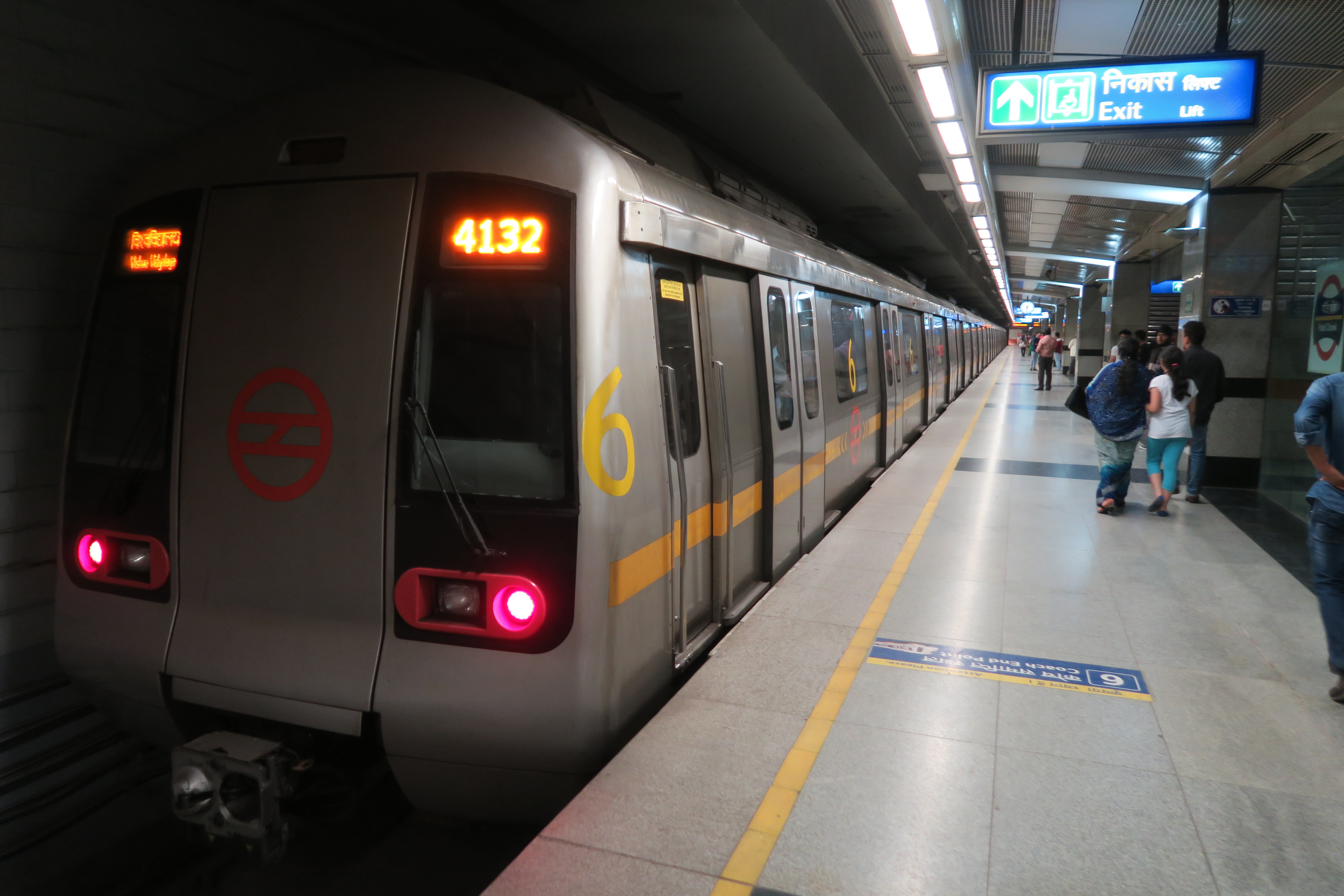
Old Yellow Line Mitsubishi-Rotem trainset

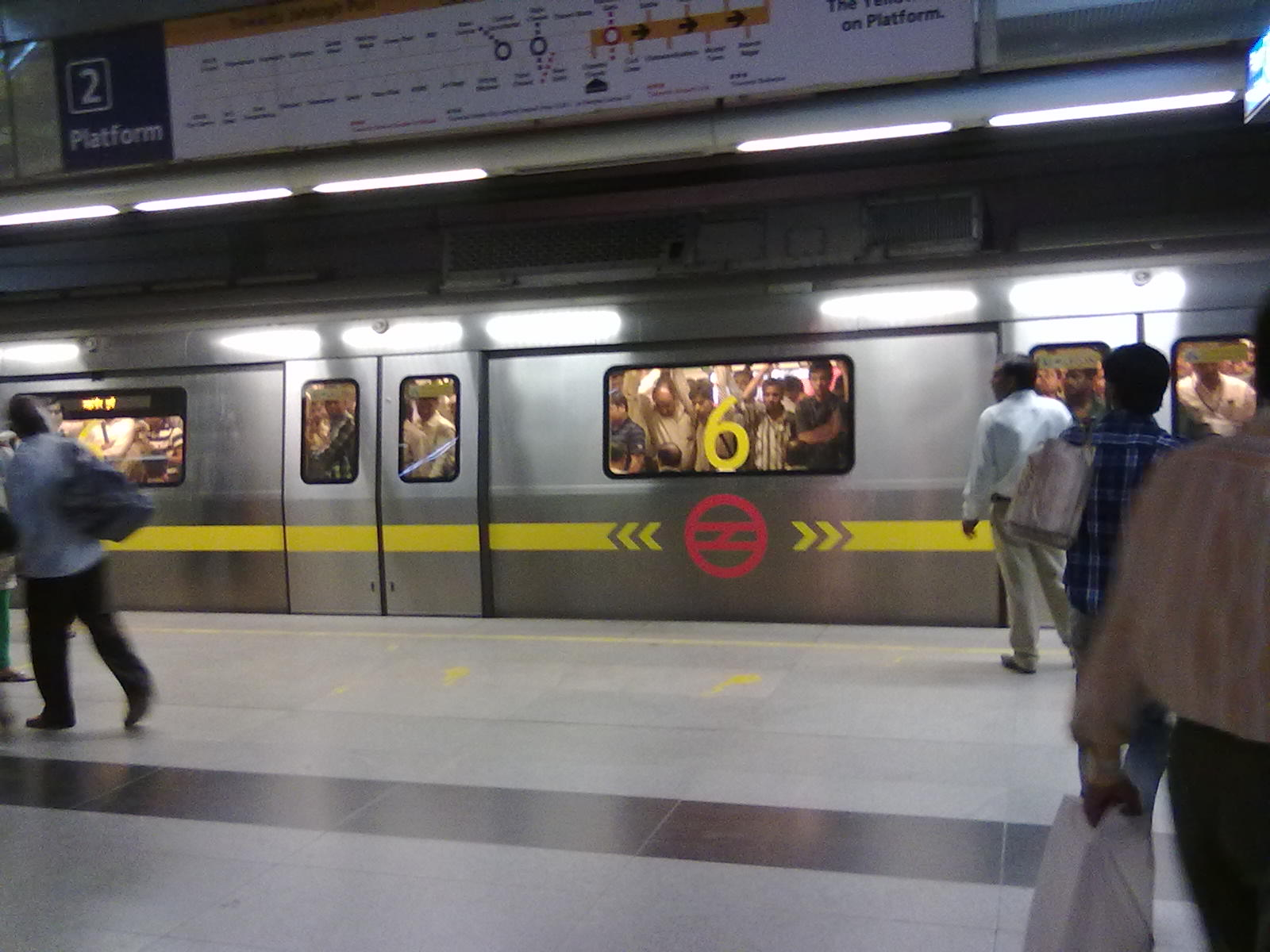
Train arriving at a Yellow Line station

The Yellow Line, the metro's second line, was its first underground line. Running 49 kilometres (30 mi) north to south, it connects Samaypur Badli with Millennium City Centre Gurugram in Gurugram. The northern and southern parts of the line are elevated, while the central section (which passes through some of the most congested as well as ultra-luxurious parts of Delhi) is underground. The underground section between Vishwavidyalaya and Kashmere Gate opened on 20 December 2004; the Kashmere Gate – Central Secretariat section opened on 3 July 2005, and Vishwavidyalaya – Jahangirpuri on 4 February 2009. The line has India's second-deepest metro station at Chawri Bazar, 25 metres (82 ft) below ground level.

An additional stretch from Qutab Minar to Millennium City Centre Gurugram, initially operating separately from the mainline, opened on 21 June 2010; the Chhatarpur station on this stretch opened on 26 August of that year. Due to delays in acquiring land to construct the station, it was built with prefabricated structures in nine months and is the only Delhi Metro station made completely of steel. The connecting link between Central Secretariat and Qutub Minar opened on 3 September 2010. On 10 November 2015, the line was further extended between Jahangirpuri and Samaypur Badli in Outer Delhi.

Interchanges are available with the Red Line and Kashmere Gate ISBT at Kashmere Gate, with the Blue Line at Rajiv Chowk, with the Violet Line at Kashmere Gate and Central Secretariat, with the Airport Express at New Delhi, with the Pink Line at Azadpur and Dilli Haat - INA, with the Magenta Line at Hauz Khas and Haiderpur Badli Mor, with Rapid Metro Gurgaon at Sikanderpur, and with Indian Railways at Chandni Chowk and New Delhi.

The Yellow Line was the metro's second line to replace four-coach trains with six- and eight-coach configurations. The Metro Museum at Patel Chowk metro station, South Asia's only rapid-transit museum, has a collection of display panels, historical photographs and exhibits tracing the genesis of the Delhi Metro. The museum was opened on 1 January 2009.

=== Blue Line (Lines 3 and 4) ===
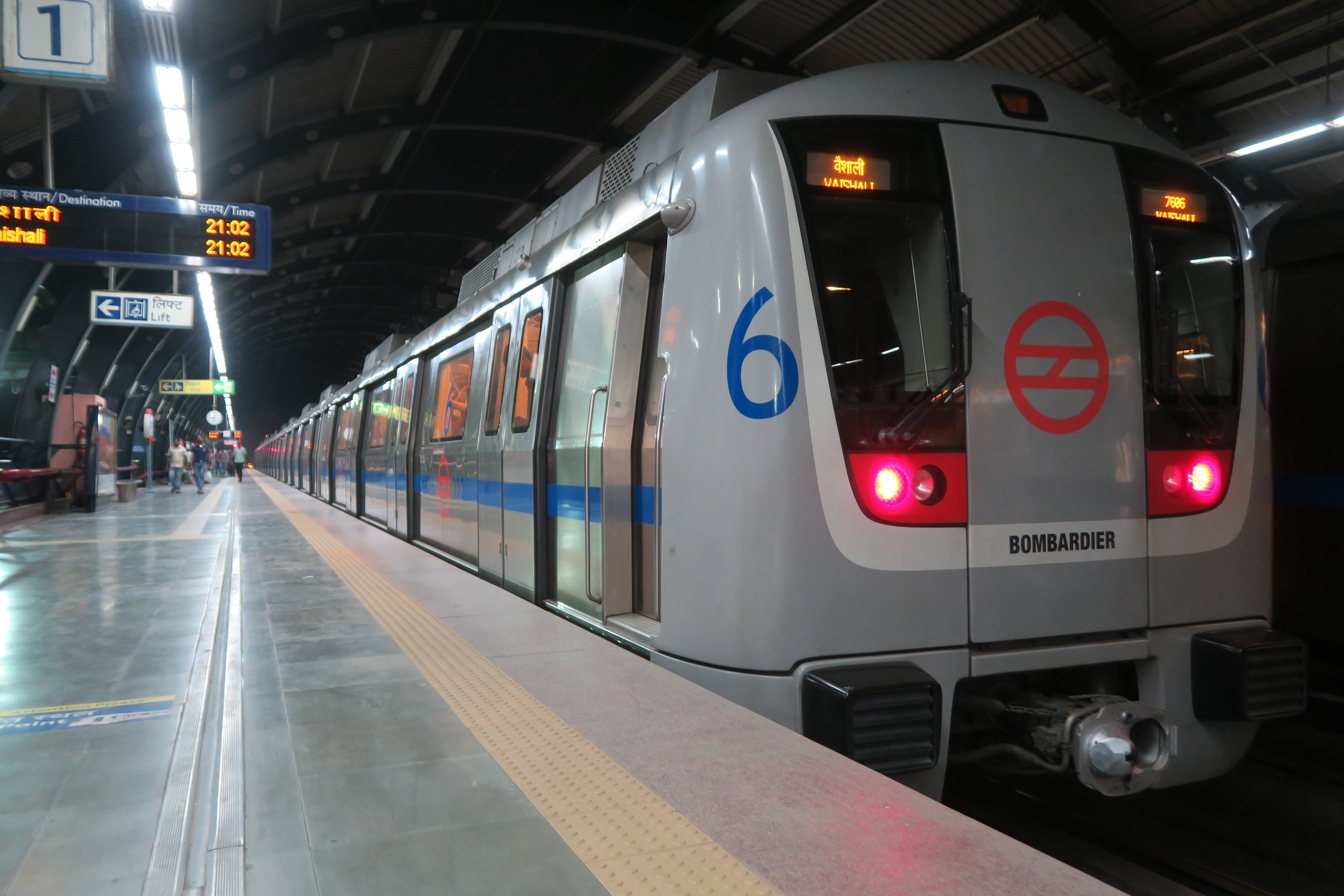
New Bombardier Blue Line trainset

The Blue Line, the third line of the metro open, was the first to connect areas outside Delhi. Mainly elevated and partly underground, it connects Dwarka Sub City in the west with the satellite city of Noida in the east for a distance of 56.61 kilometres (35.18 mi). The line's first section, between Dwarka and Barakhamba Road, opened on 31 December 2005, and subsequent sections opened between Dwarka Kakrola – Dwarka Sector 9 on 1 April 2006, Barakhamba Road – Indraprastha on 11 November 2006, Indraprastha – Yamuna Bank on 10 May 2009, Yamuna Bank – Noida City Centre on 12 November 2009, and Dwarka Sector 9 – Dwarka Sector 21 on 30 October 2010. The line crosses the Yamuna River between the Indraprastha and Yamuna Bank stations, and has India's second extradosed bridge across the Northern Railways mainlines near Pragati Maidan.

A branch of the Blue Line, inaugurated on 8 January 2010, runs for 6.25 kilometres (3.88 mi) from the Yamuna Bank station to Anand Vihar in East Delhi. It was extended to Vaishali on 14 July 2011. A 2.76-kilometre (1.71 mi) stretch from Dwarka Sector 9 to Dwarka Sector 21 opened on 30 October 2010. On 9 March 2019, a 6.67 km (4.14 mi) extension from Noida City Centre to Noida Electronic City was opened by Prime Minister Narendra Modi. Interchanges are available with the Aqua Line (Noida Metro) Noida Sector 51 station at Noida Sector 52, with the Yellow Line at Rajiv Chowk, with the Green Line at Kirti Nagar, with the Violet Line at Mandi House, with the Airport Express at Dwarka Sector 21, with the Pink Line at Rajouri Garden, Mayur Vihar Phase-I, Karkarduma and Anand Vihar, with the Magenta Line at Janakpuri West and Botanical Garden, and with Indian Railways and the Interstate Bus Station (ISBT) at Anand Vihar station (which connects with Anand Vihar Railway Terminal and Anand Vihar ISBT). An interchange with the Red Line at Mohan Nagar is planned.

=== Green Line (Line 5) ===
Mitsubishi-Rotem-BEML rolling stock on the Green Line

Opened in 2010, the Green Line (Line 5) was Delhi Metro's fifth and its first standard-gauge line; the others were broad gauge. It runs between Inderlok (a Red Line station) and Brigadier Hoshiyar Singh, with a branch line connecting its Ashok Park Main station with Kirti Nagar on the Blue Line. The elevated line, built as part of Phase-II, runs primarily along the busy NH-10 route in West Delhi. It has 24 stations, including an interchange with the Pink Line at Punjabi Bagh West, and covers a distance of 29.64 km (18.42 mi). The line had India's first standard-gauge maintenance depot at Mundka.

It opened in two stages, with the 15.1-kilometre (9.38 mi) Inderlok–Mundka section opening on 3 April 2010 and the 3.5-kilometre (2.17 mi) Kirti Nagar–Ashok Park Main branch line opening on 27 August 2011. On 6 August 2012, to improve commuting in the National Capital Region, the government of India approved an extension from Mundka to Bahadurgarh in Haryana. The 11.18-kilometre (6.95 mi) stretch has seven stations (Mundka Industrial Area, Ghevra, Tikri Kalan, Tikri Border, Pandit Shree Ram Sharma, Bahadurgarh City and Brigadier Hoshiyar Singh) between Mundka and Bahadurgarh, and opened on 24 June 2018.

=== Violet Line (Line 6) ===
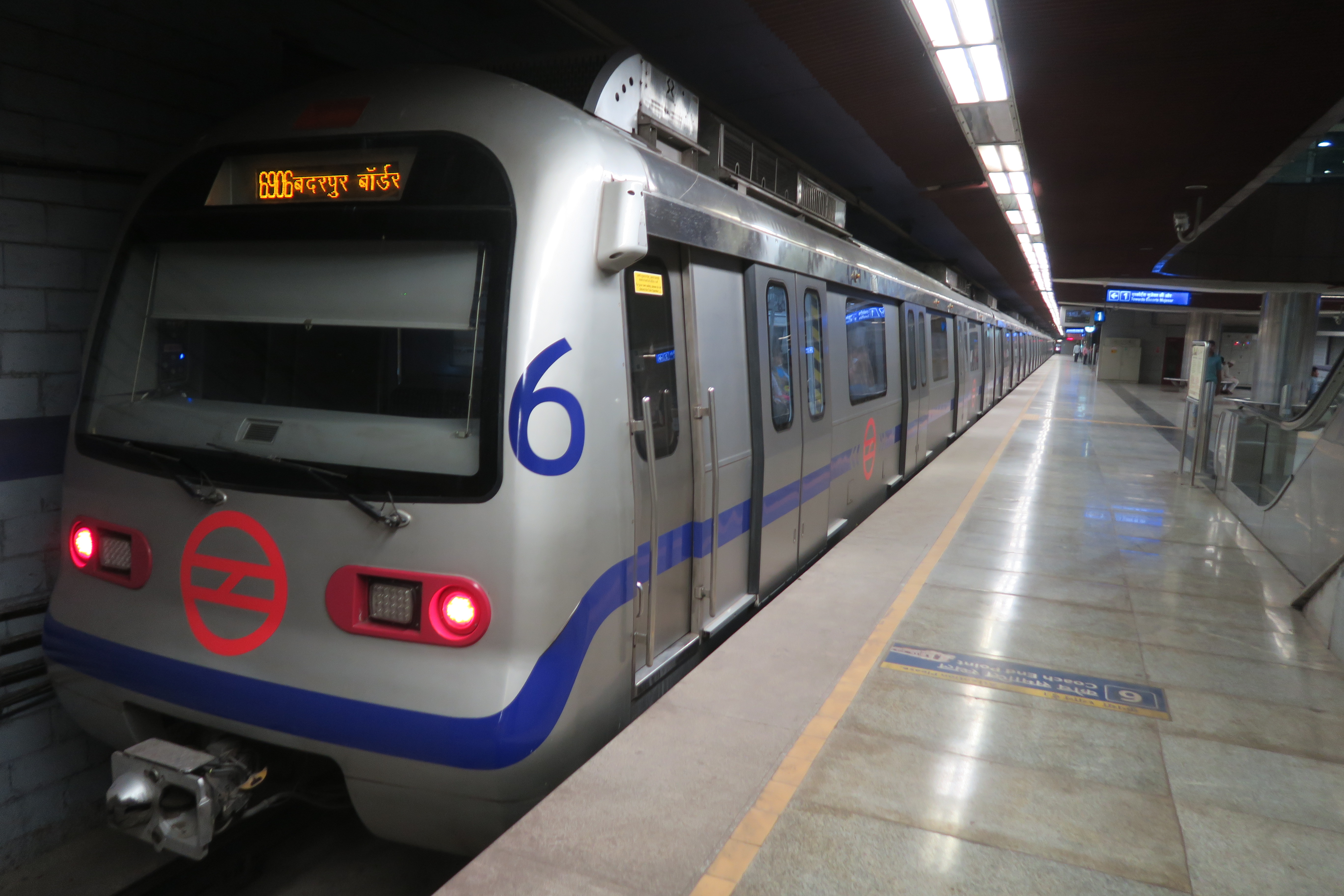
Mitsubishi-Rotem-BEML rolling stock on the Violet Line

The Violet Line is the sixth metro line opened and the second standard-gauge corridor, after the Green Line. The 47-kilometre-long (29 mi) line connects Raja Nahar Singh in Ballabgarh via Faridabad to Kashmere Gate in New Delhi, with 26 km (16 mi) overhead and the rest underground. The first section between Central Secretariat and Sarita Vihar opened on 3 October 2010, hours before the inaugural ceremony of the 2010 Commonwealth Games, and connects Jawaharlal Nehru Stadium (the venue for the games' opening and closing ceremonies). Completed in 41 months, it includes a 100-metre-long (330 ft) bridge over the Indian Railways mainlines and a 167.5-metre-long (550 ft) cable-stayed bridge across a road flyover; it connects several hospitals, tourist attractions, and an industrial estate. Service is provided at five-minute intervals. An interchange with the Yellow Line is available at Central Secretariat through an integrated concourse. On 14 January 2011, the remaining portion from Sarita Vihar to Badarpur was opened; this added three new stations to the network.

The section between Mandi House and Central Secretariat was opened on 26 June 2014, and a 971-metre-long (3,186 ft) section between ITO and Mandi House was opened on 8 June 2015. A 14 km (8.7 mi) extension south to Escorts Mujesar in Faridabad was inaugurated by Prime Minister Narendra Modi on 6 September 2015. All nine stations on the Badarpur–Escorts Mujesar (Faridabad) section of the metro's Phase III received the highest rating (platinum) for adherence to green-building norms from the Indian Green Building Council (IGBC). The awards were given to DMRC Managing Director Mangu Singh by IGBC chair P. C. Jain on 10 September 2015.

The line's Faridabad corridor is the longest corridor outside Delhi: 11 stations and 17 km (11 mi). On 28 May 2017, the ITO–Kashmere Gate corridor was opened by Union Minister of Urban Development Venkaiah Naidu and Chief Minister of Delhi Arvind Kejriwal. The underground section is popularly known as the Heritage Line. Interchanges are available with the Red Line at Kashmere Gate, with the Yellow Line at Kashmere Gate and Central Secretariat, with the Blue Line at Mandi House, with the Pink Line at Lajpat Nagar and with the Magenta Line at Kalkaji Mandir.

=== Airport Express Line / Orange Line ===
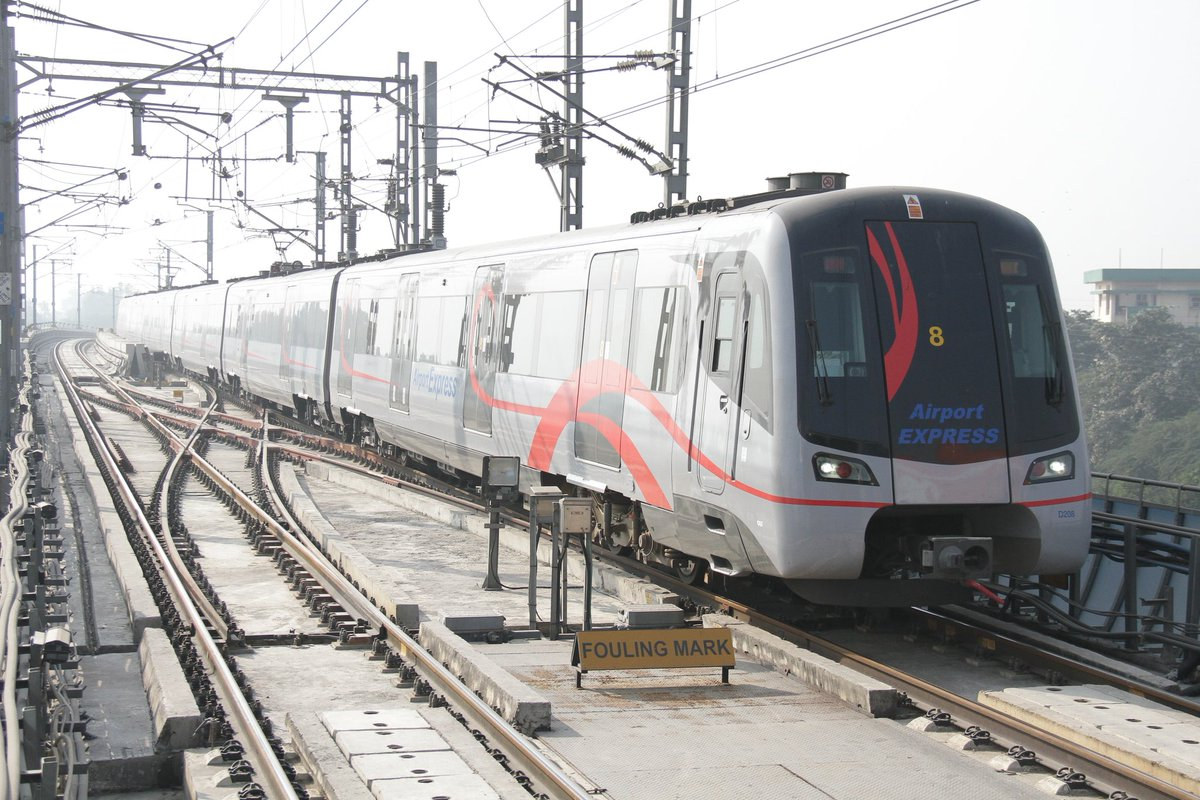
The Airport Express Line

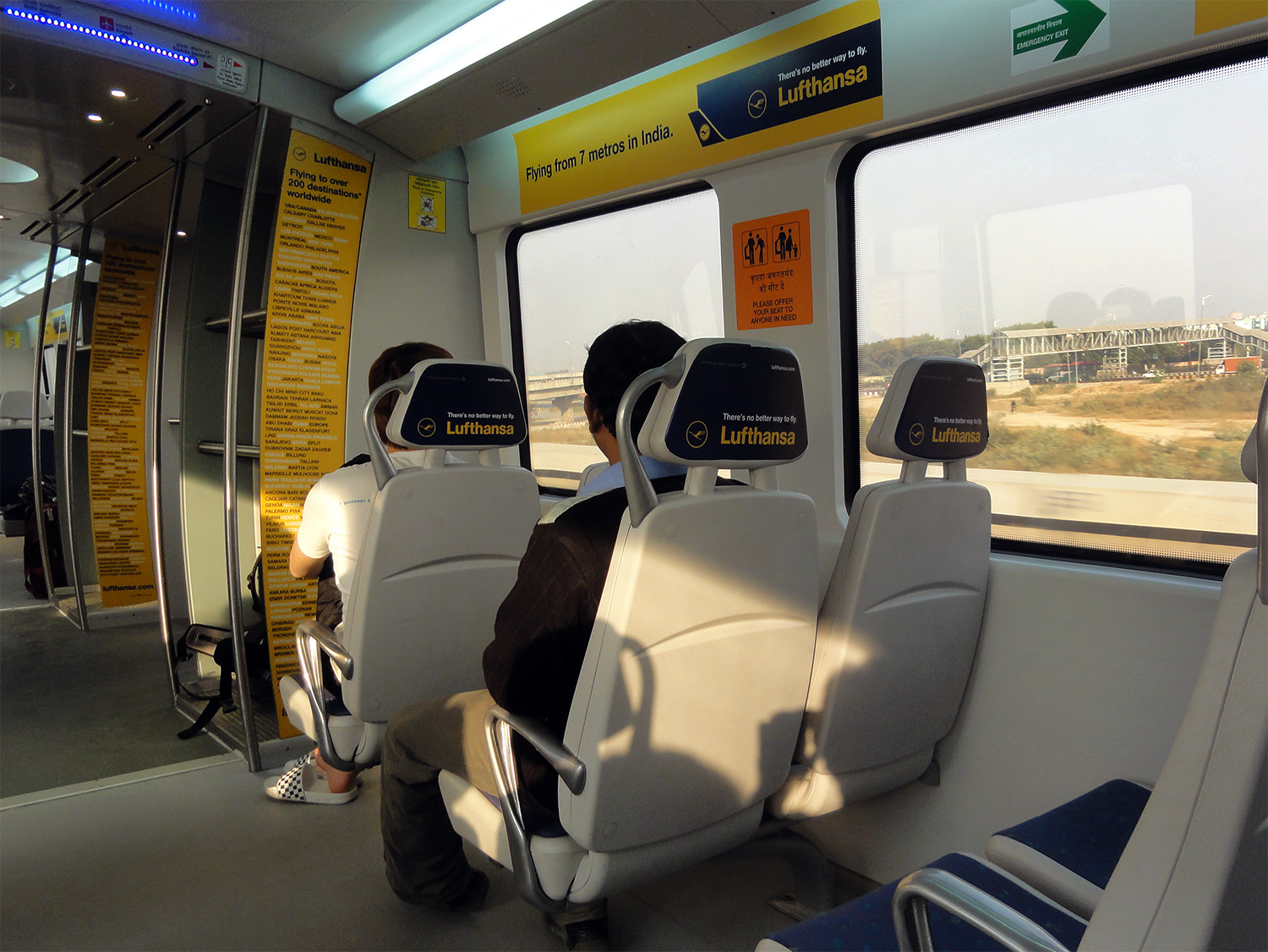
Interior of an Airport Express train

The Airport Express line runs 22.7 km (14.1 mi) from New Delhi to Yashobhoomi Dwarka Sector - 25, linking the New Delhi railway station and Indira Gandhi International Airport. The line was operated by Delhi Airport Metro Express Pvt. Limited (DAMEL), a subsidiary of Reliance Infrastructure (the line's concessionaire until 30 June 2013). It is now operated by DMRC. The line was built at a cost of ₹57 billion (US$610 million), of which Reliance Infrastructure invested ₹28.85 billion (US$310 million) and will pay fees in a revenue-share model. It has six stations (Dhaula Kuan and Delhi Aerocity became operational on 15 August 2011), and some have check-in facilities, parking, and eateries. Rolling stock consists of six-coach trains, operating at ten-minute intervals, with a maximum speed of 120 km/h (75 mph).

Originally scheduled to open before the 2010 Commonwealth Games, the line failed to obtain the mandatory safety clearance and was opened on 23 February 2011 after a delay of about five months. Sixteen months after beginning operations, it was shut down for viaduct repairs on 7 July 2012. The line reopened on 22 January 2013. On 27 June 2013, Reliance Infrastructure told DMRC that they were unable to operate the line beyond 30 June of that year. DMRC took over the line on 1 July 2013 with a 100-person operations and maintenance team. In January 2015, DMRC reported that the line's ridership had increased about 30 percent after a fare reduction of up to 40 percent the previous July. DMRC announced a further fare reduction on 14 September 2015, with a maximum fare of ₹60 and minimum of ₹10 instead of ₹100 and ₹20. DMRC said that this was done to reduce crowding on the Blue Line, diverting some Dwarka-bound passengers to the Airport Express Line (which was underutilised and faster than the Blue Line). The line's speed was increased from 100 km/h (62 mph) to 110 km/h (68 mph) on 24 June 2023, enabling a 16-minute ride from New Delhi to IGI Airport.

Interchanges are available with the Yellow Line at New Delhi, with the Blue Line at Dwarka Sector 21, with the Durgabai Deshmukh South Campus metro station of the Pink Line at Dhaula Kuan, and with Indian Railways at New Delhi. An expansion of Dwarka Sector 25 was inaugurated on 17 September 2023 with the opening of the adjacent India International Convention Centre.

=== Pink Line (Line 7) ===
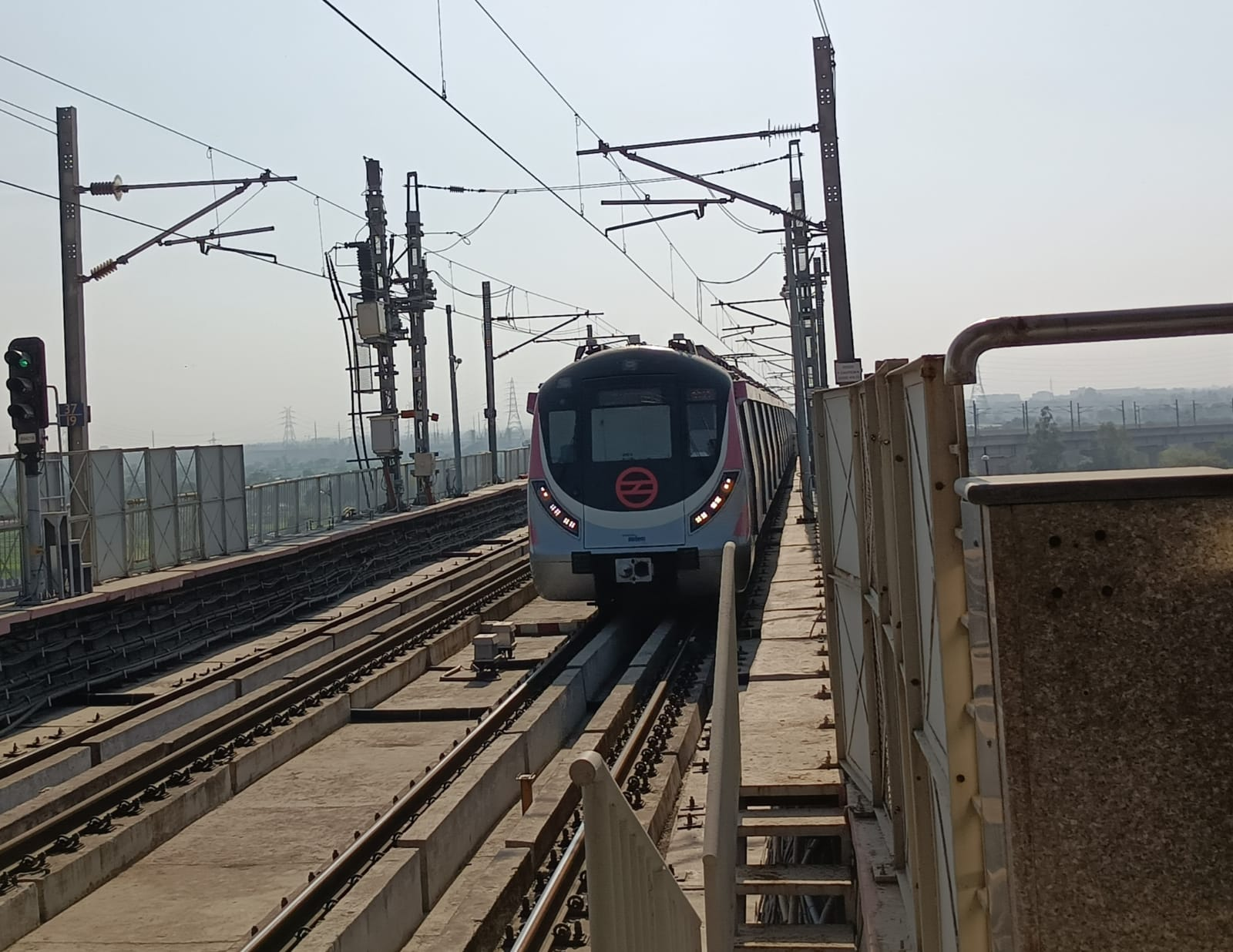
A Hyundai Rotem coach on the Pink Line at the Mayur Vihar-I station

The Pink Line is the second new line of the Delhi Metro's third phase. It was opened on 14 March 2018, with an extension opening on 6 August. The Trilokpuri-Sanjay Lake - Shiv Vihar section was opened on 31 October, and the Lajpat Nagar - Shree Ram Mandir Mayur Vihar section opened on 31 December of that year. The section, between Shree Ram Mandir Mayur Vihar and Trilokpuri - Sanjay Lake, was opened on 6 August 2021 after delays due to land-acquisition and rehabilitation issues. The final section between Majlis Park and Maujpur - Babarpur was opened on 8 March 2026. It covers Delhi in a Ring-shaped pattern which makes it India's first Ring metro which travels in clockwise or anti-clockwise direction with a branch line connecting Shiv Vihar to it.

The Pink Line has 46 stations from Maujpur - Babarpur via Majlis Park to Shiv Vihar, both in North Delhi. With a length of 73.49 kilometres (45.66 mi), it is the Delhi Metro's longest line. The mostly elevated line covers Delhi in a ring-shaped pattern. It is also known as the Ring Road Line, since it runs along the busy Ring Road.

The line has interchanges with most of the metro's other lines, including with the Red Line at Netaji Subhash Place and Welcome, with the Yellow Line at Azadpur and Dilli Haat – INA, with the Blue Line at Rajouri Garden, Mayur Vihar Phase-I, Anand Vihar and Karkarduma, with the Green Line at Punjabi Bagh West, with Dhaula Kuan of the Airport Express at Durgabai Deshmukh South Campus, with the Violet Line at Lajpat Nagar, with the Magenta Line at Majlis Park, with Indian Railways at Hazrat Nizamuddin and Anand Vihar Terminal, and the ISBTs at Anand Vihar and Sarai Kale Khan. The Pink Line reaches the Delhi Metro's highest point at Dhaula Kuan – 23.6 metres (77 ft 5 in), passing over the Dhaula Kuan grade-separator flyovers and the Airport Express Line.

=== Magenta Line (Line 8) ===
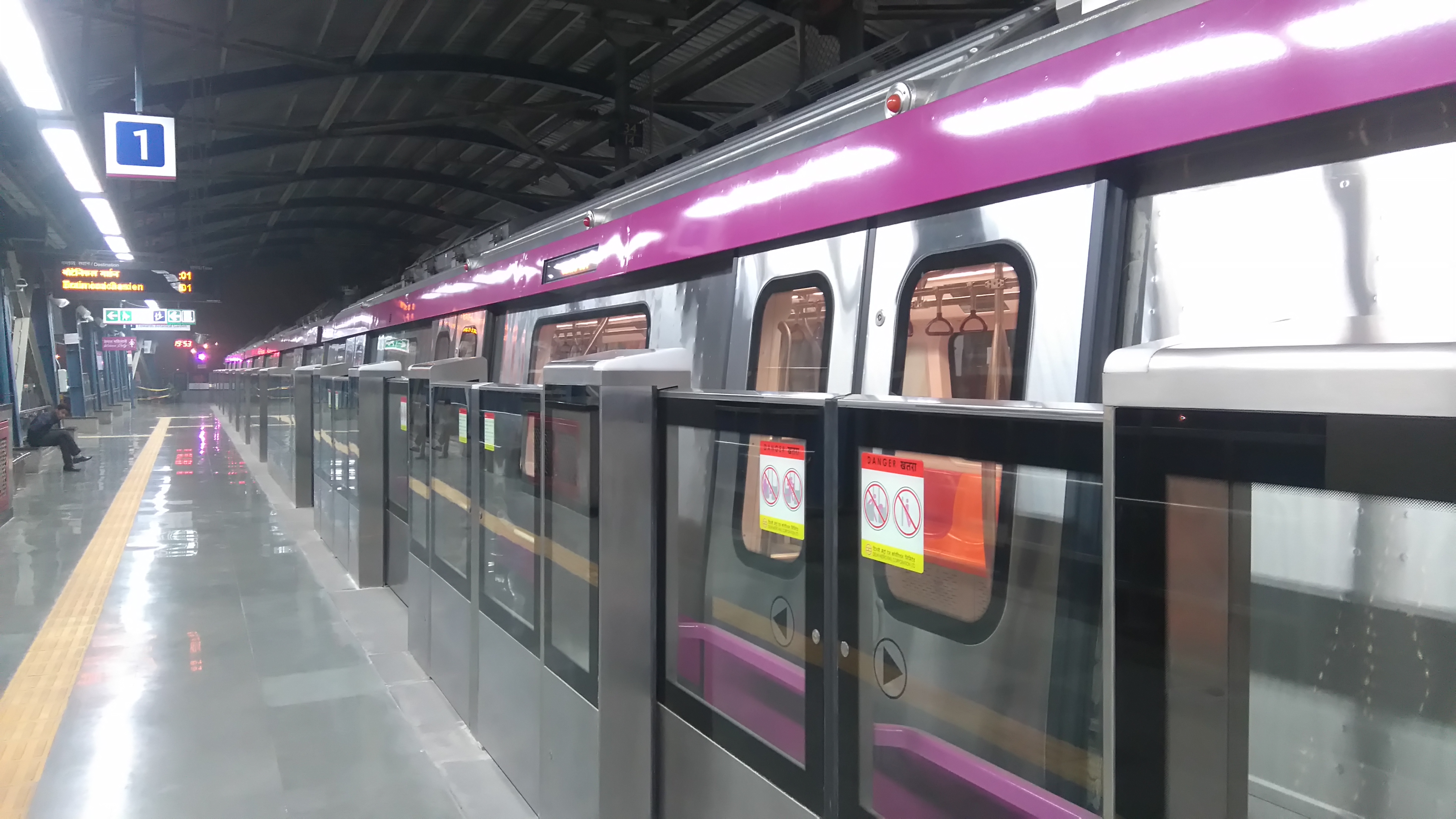
A Magenta Line train at a station

The Magenta Line is the Delhi Metro's first new line of its third phase. The Botanical Garden - Kalkaji Mandir section opened on 25 December 2017, and the Janakpuri West - Kalkaji Mandir section of the line opened on 28 May 2018. Further, in Phase IV, the Janakpuri West - Krishna Park Extension extension, opened on 5 January 2026, and the disjoint Majlis Park - Deepali Chowk section opened on 8 March 2026.

Currently, the line has 33 stations of which 26 stations, from Krishna Park Extension to Botanical Garden and 7 stations, from Majlis Park to Deepali Chowk. The line directly connects to Terminal 1D of Indira Gandhi International Airport. The Hauz Khas station on this line and the Yellow Line is the deepest metro station, at a depth of 29 metres (95 ft). The Magenta Line has interchanges with the Yellow Line at Hauz Khas and Haiderpur Badli Mor, with the Blue Line at Janakpuri West and Botanical Garden, and with the Violet Line at Kalkaji Mandir, with the Red Line at Madhuban Chowk and with the Pink Line at Majlis Park. India's first driverless train service began on the Magenta Line in December 2020.

As of February 2026, it was decided that the Inderlok-Indraprastha corridor under Green Line's extension for Phase 4 will now be implemented as an extension for Magenta Line instead, which will bring the total corridor length from Botanical Garden to Inderlok to about 89 km, making it the longest metro line in Delhi. Consequently, the line will form an interchange with itself at Nabi Karim.

=== Grey Line (Line 9) ===
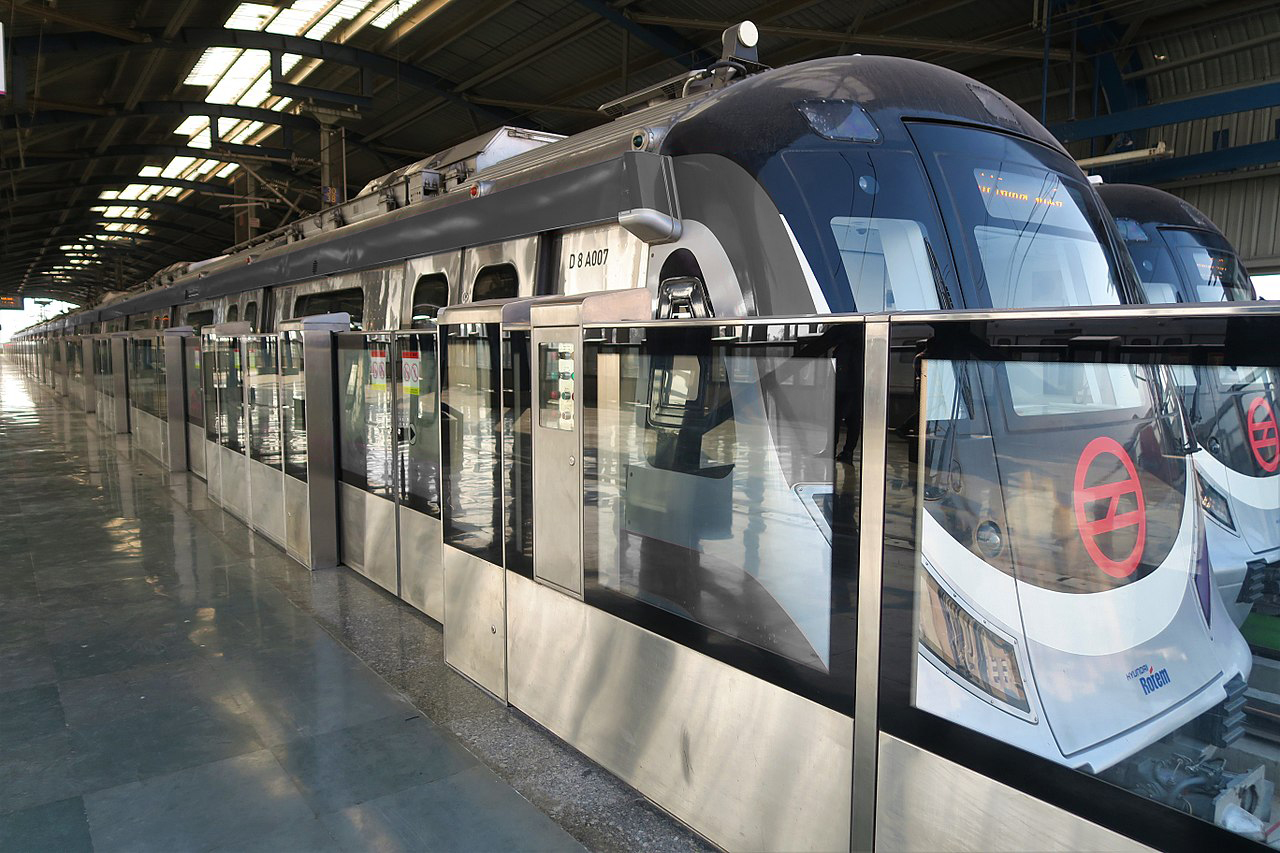
A Hyundai Rotem train on the Grey Line

The Grey Line (also known as Line 9), the Delhi metro's shortest line, runs from Dwarka-Kakrola to Dhansa Bus Stand in western Delhi. The 4.295 km (2.669 mi) line has four stations (Dhansa Bus Stand, Najafgarh, Nangli and Dwarka-Kakrola), and has an interchange with the Blue Line at Dwarka-Kakrola. The Dwarka Kakrola - Najafgarh section was opened on 4 October 2019. The extension from Najafgarh to Dhansa Bus Stand was scheduled to open in December 2020, but construction was delayed by the COVID-19 pandemic; it opened on 18 September 2021.

== Network ==
The Delhi Metro has been undergoing construction in phases. Phase I consisted of 59 stations and 64.75 km (40.23 mi) of route length, of which 13.0 km (8.1 mi) is underground and 52.0 km (32.3 mi) at grade or elevated. The inauguration of the Dwarka-Kakrola–Barakhamba Road corridor of the Blue Line completed Phase I in October 2006. Phase II consists of 123.3 km (76.6 mi) of route length and 86 stations, and is completed; the first section opened in June 2008, and the last section opened in August 2011. Phase III consists of 109 stations, three new lines and seven route extensions, totaling 160.07 km (99.46 mi), at a cost of ₹410.79 billion (US$4.4 billion). Most of it was completed on 5 April 2019, except for a small section of the Pink Line between the Mayur Vihar Pocket 1 and Trilokpuri Sanjay Lake stations (opened on 6 August 2021), the Grey Line extension from Najafgarh to Dhansa Bus Stand (opened on 18 September 2021), and the Airport Express extension from Dwarka Sector 21 to Yashbhoomi-Dwarka Sector 25 (opened on 17 September 2023).

Phase IV, with six lines totaling 103.93 km (64.58 mi), was finalized in July 2015. Of this, 61.679 km (38.326 mi) across three lines (priority corridors) with 45 stations was approved by the Government of India for construction on 7 March 2019. The Golden Line was extended in October 2020, rendering the project 65.1 km (40.5 mi) long. The one-station extension of the Magenta Line beyond RK Ashram Marg commenced operations on 5 January 2025, currently terminating at Krishna Park Extension. The rest of the network, including all planned extensions, is expected to be completed by 2029.

Delhi Metro network
Line no.	Line name	Opened	Last extension	Stations	Length (km)	Terminals		Rolling stock	Track gauge (mm)
1	Red Line	25 December 2002	9 March 2019	29	34.55	Shaheed Sthal (New Bus Adda)	Rithala	31 trains, 219 coaches	1,676
2	Yellow Line	20 December 2004	10 November 2015	37	49.02	Samaypur Badli	Millennium City Centre Gurugram	54 trains, 429 coaches	1,676
3	Blue Line	31 December 2005	9 March 2019	50	56.11	Noida Electronic City	Dwarka Sector 21	60 trains, 480 coaches	1,676
4	Blue Line	7 January 2010	14 July 2011	8	8.51	Vaishali	Dwarka Sector 21	60 trains, 480 coaches	1,676
5	Green Line	3 April 2010	24 June 2018	24	28.78	Inderlok	Brigadier Hoshiyar Singh	20 trains, 80 coaches	1,435
5	Green Line	27 August 2011	–	24	28.78	Kirti Nagar	Brigadier Hoshiyar Singh	20 trains, 80 coaches	1,435
6	Violet Line	3 October 2010	19 November 2018	34	46.34	Kashmere Gate	Raja Nahar Singh (Ballabhgarh)	37 trains, 220 coaches	1,435
-	Airport Express Line	23 February 2011	17 September 2023	7	22.91	New Delhi	Yashobhoomi Dwarka Sector - 25	6 trains, 36 coaches	1,435
7	Pink Line	14 March 2018	8 March 2026	45	73.49	Maujpur - Babarpur	Shiv Vihar	48 trains, 286 coaches	1,435
8	Magenta Line	25 December 2017	5 January 2025	26	40.26	Botanical Garden	Krishna Park Extension	24 trains, 144 coaches	1,435
8	Magenta Line	25 December 2017	8 March 2026	7	9.92	Deepali Chowk	Majlis Park	24 trains, 144 coaches	1,435
9	Grey Line	4 October 2019	18 September 2021	4	5.19	Dwarka-Kakrola	Dhansa Bus Stand	3 trains, 17 coaches	1,435
Total				243	374.47	-	-	307 trains, 2,055 coaches	-

== Operations ==
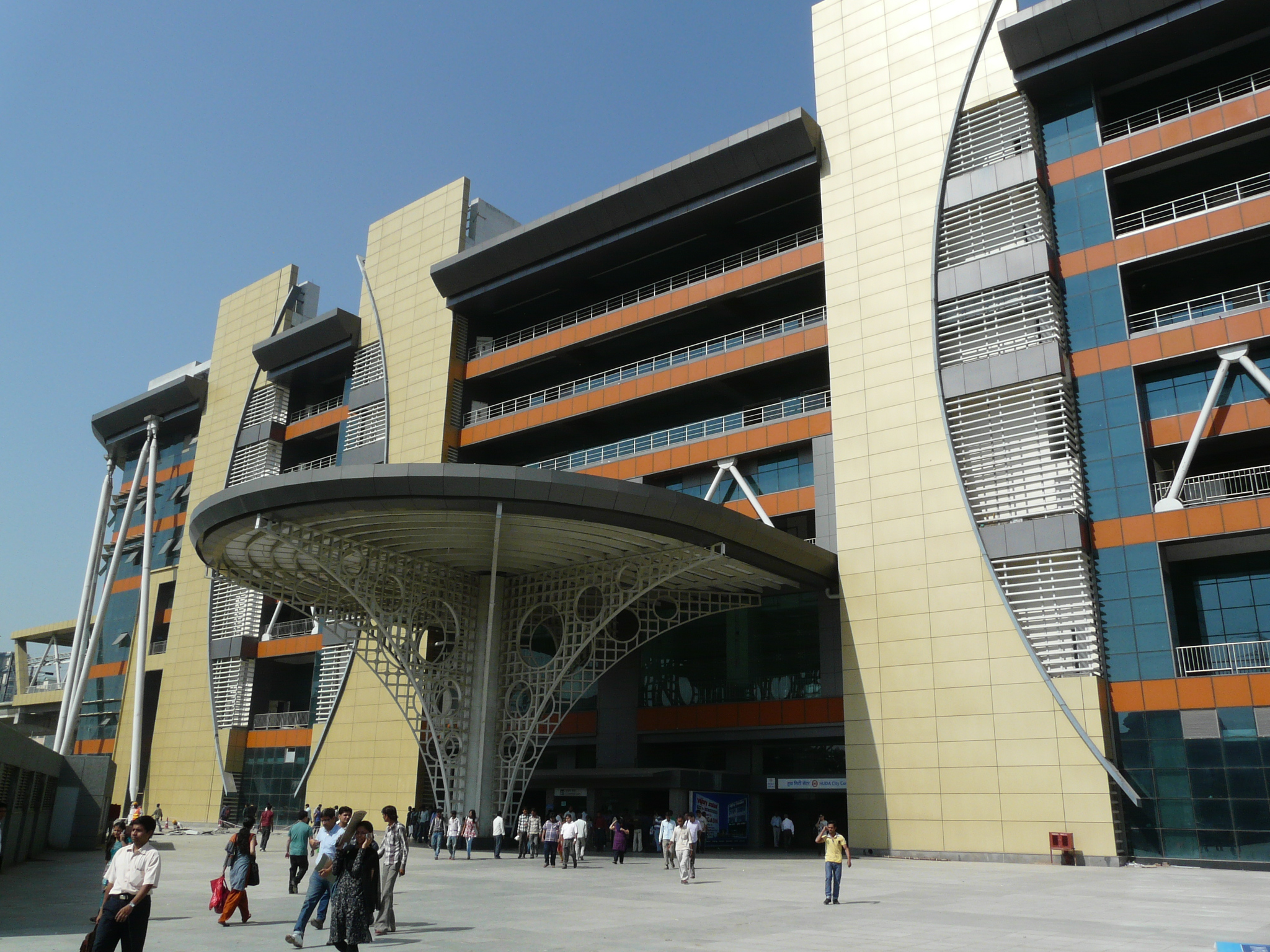
Millennium City Centre Gurugram metro station

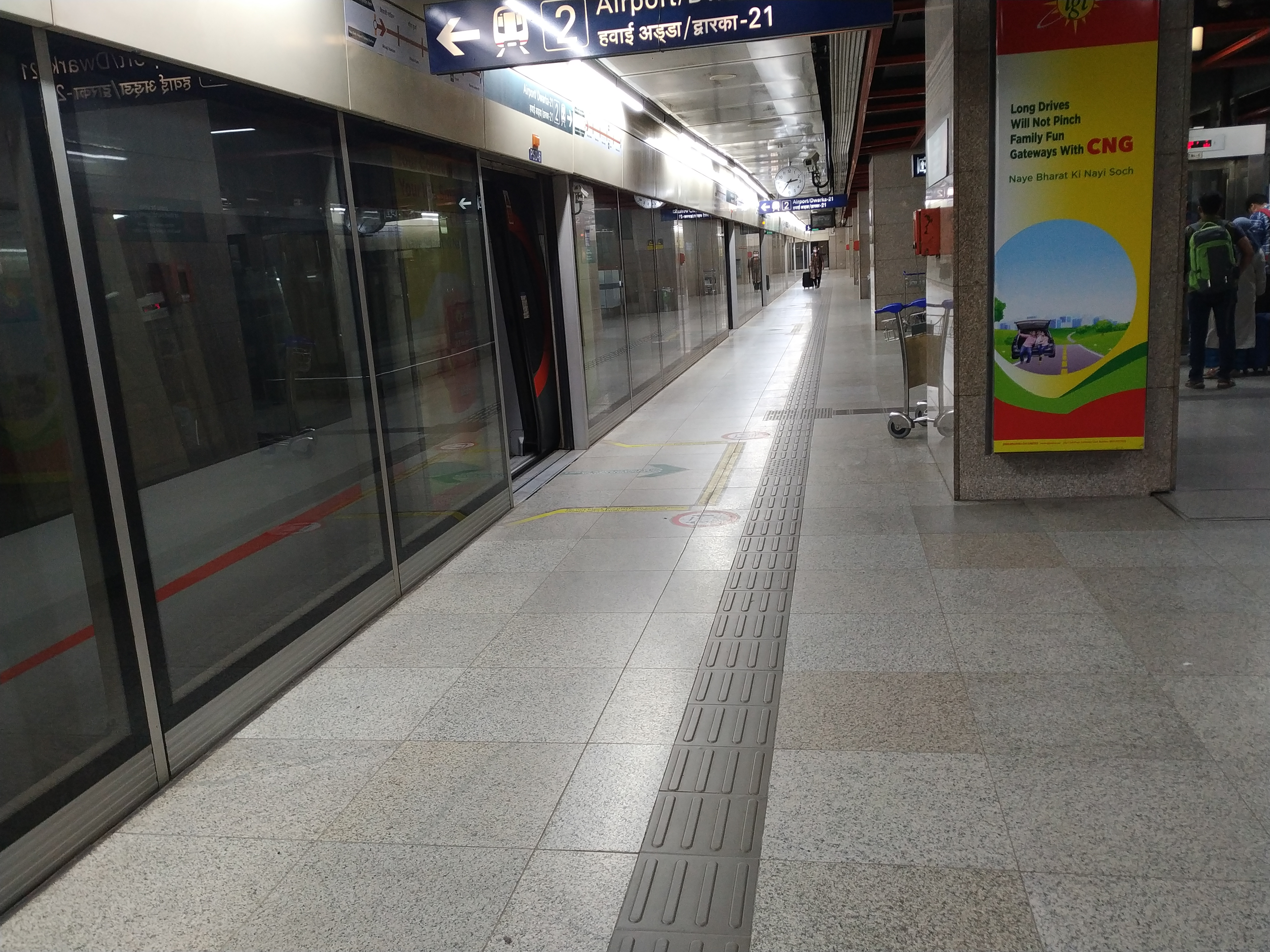
Platform screen doors at the New Delhi metro station

Trains operate at a frequency of one to two minutes to five to ten minutes between 05:00 and 00:00, depending upon peak and off-peak hours. They typically travel up to 75 km/h (47 mph), and stop for about 20 seconds at each station. Automated station announcements are in Hindi and English. Many stations have ATMs, food outlets, cafés, convenience stores and mobile recharge. Eating, drinking, smoking, and chewing gum are prohibited. The metro has a sophisticated fire alarm system for advance warning in emergencies, and fire retardant material is used in trains and stations. Navigation information is available on Google Maps. Since October 2010, the first coach of every train is reserved for women; the last coach is also reserved when the train changes tracks at the terminal stations on the Red, Green and Violet Lines. The mobile Delhi Metro Rail app has been introduced for iPhone and Android users with information such as the location of the nearest metro station, fares, parking availability, nearby tourist attractions, security and emergency helpline numbers.

=== Security ===
Security has been provided by the CISF Unit DMRC since 2007. Closed-circuit cameras monitor trains and stations, and their feeds are monitored by the CISF and Delhi Metro authorities. Over 7,000 CISF personnel have been deployed for security in addition to metal detectors, X-ray baggage-inspection systems, and detection dogs. Eighteen Delhi Metro Rail Police stations have been established, and about 5,200 CCTV cameras have been installed. Each underground station has 45 to 50 cameras, and each elevated station has 16 to 20 cameras. The cameras are monitored by the CISF and the Delhi Metro Rail Corporation. Intercoms are provided in each train car for emergency communication between passengers and the train operator. Periodic security drills are carried out at stations and on trains. The DMRC is considering raising station walls and railings for passenger safety.

=== Ticketing ===
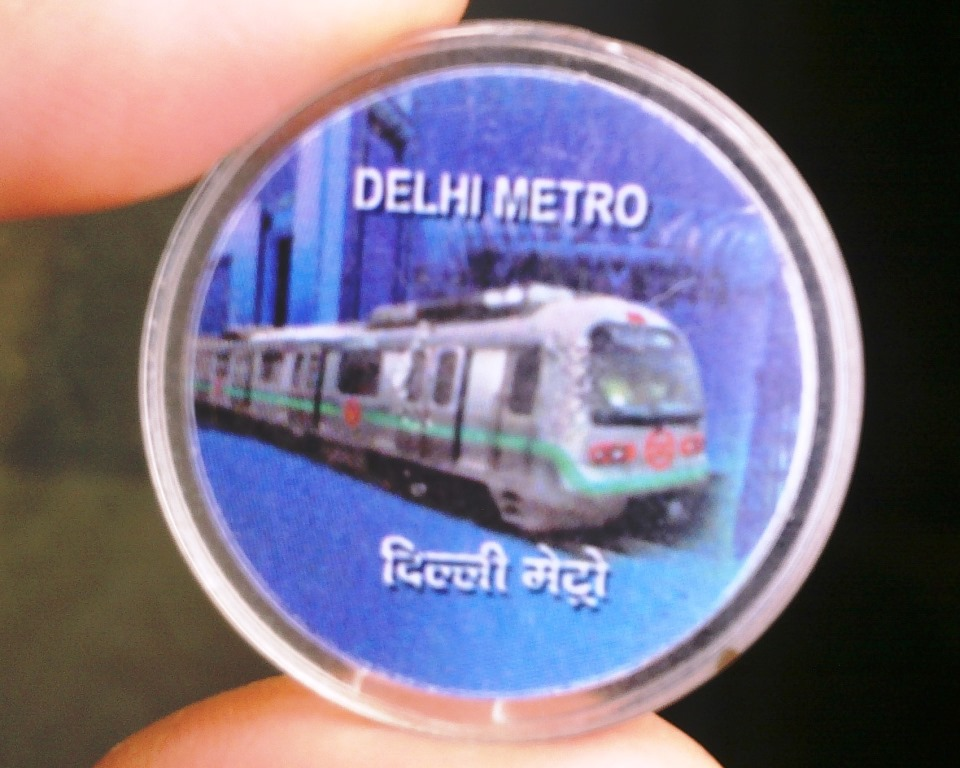
A Delhi Metro token

The metro's fares were last revised on 10 October 2017, based on the recommendation of the 4th Fare Fixation Committee in May 2016. Metro commuters have five choices for ticket purchases:

- RFID token: RFID tokens are valid only for a single journey on the day of purchase. Their value depends on the distance travelled, with fares for a single journey ranging from ₹10 (11¢ US) to ₹60 (64¢ US). Fares are calculated based on the distance between the origin and destination stations. As of 2024, they are no longer in use.
- Smart card: Smart cards are available for longer terms, and are the most convenient for frequent commuters. Valid for ten years from the date of purchase or the date of the last recharge, they are available in denominations of ₹200 (US$2.10) to ₹3,000 (US$32.00). A 10-percent discount is given, with an additional 10-percent discount for off-peak travel. A new card has a ₹50 (53¢ US) deposit, refundable on its return before expiry if physically undamaged. For women commuters, the Delhi government unsuccessfully proposed a fare-exemption scheme. A common ticketing facility, allowing commuters to use smart cards on Delhi Transport Corporation (DTC) buses and the metro, was introduced on 28 August 2018.
- Tourist card: Tourist cards can be used for unlimited travel on the Delhi Metro for short periods of time. There are two kinds of tourist cards, valid for one and three days. The cost of a one-day card is ₹200 (US$2.10) and a three-day card is ₹500 (US$5.30), including a refundable deposit of ₹50 (53¢ US) paid at purchase.
- National Common Mobility Card: Part of the Indian government's One Nation, One Card policy, the National Common Mobility Card is an inter-operable transport card enabling a user to pay for travel, tolls, shopping and cash. Enabled through RuPay, the NCMC was commissioned on the Airport Express Line on 28 December 2020. In June 2023, DMRC completed the upgrade of its automatic fare collection (AFC) systems to be compliant with NCMC services.
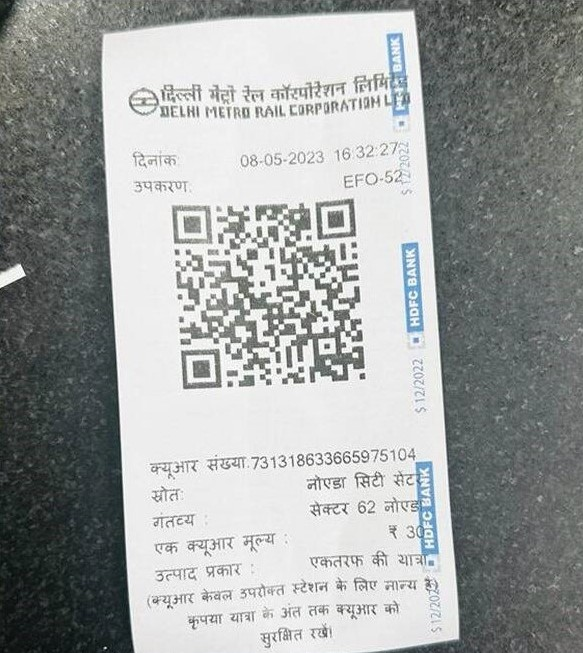
  Delhi Metro QR ticket
- QR code based ticketing: A Delhi Metro QR ticket is a mobile-based ticket allowing travel like a token or recharge card. A ticket can be bought online with the RIDLR app. For entry and exit, the QR ticket is scanned at the AFC gates. Similar to mobile-based tickets, paper QR tickets can be bought at a station.

=== Problems ===
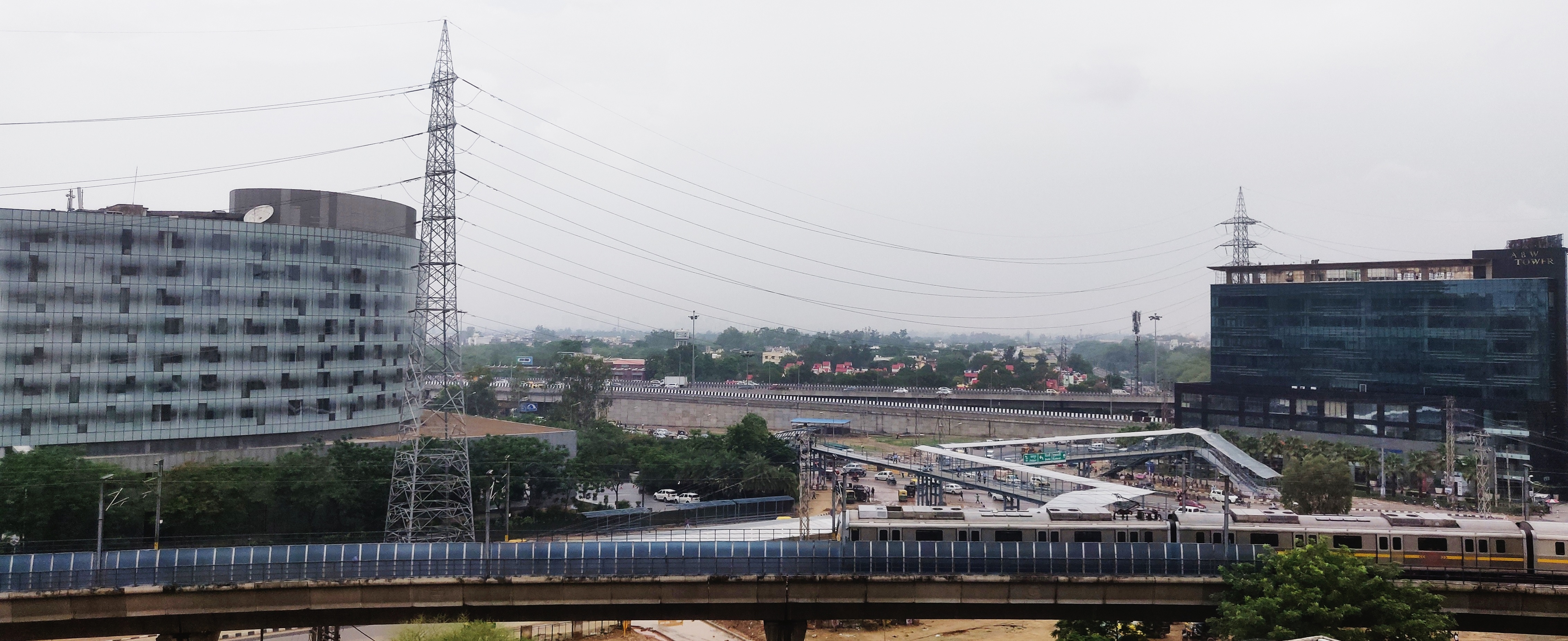
The Yellow Line near the IFFCO Chowk metro station in Gurgaon. After complaints from nearby residents, the Delhi Metro installed barriers in 2011 to reduce noise pollution from metro trains.

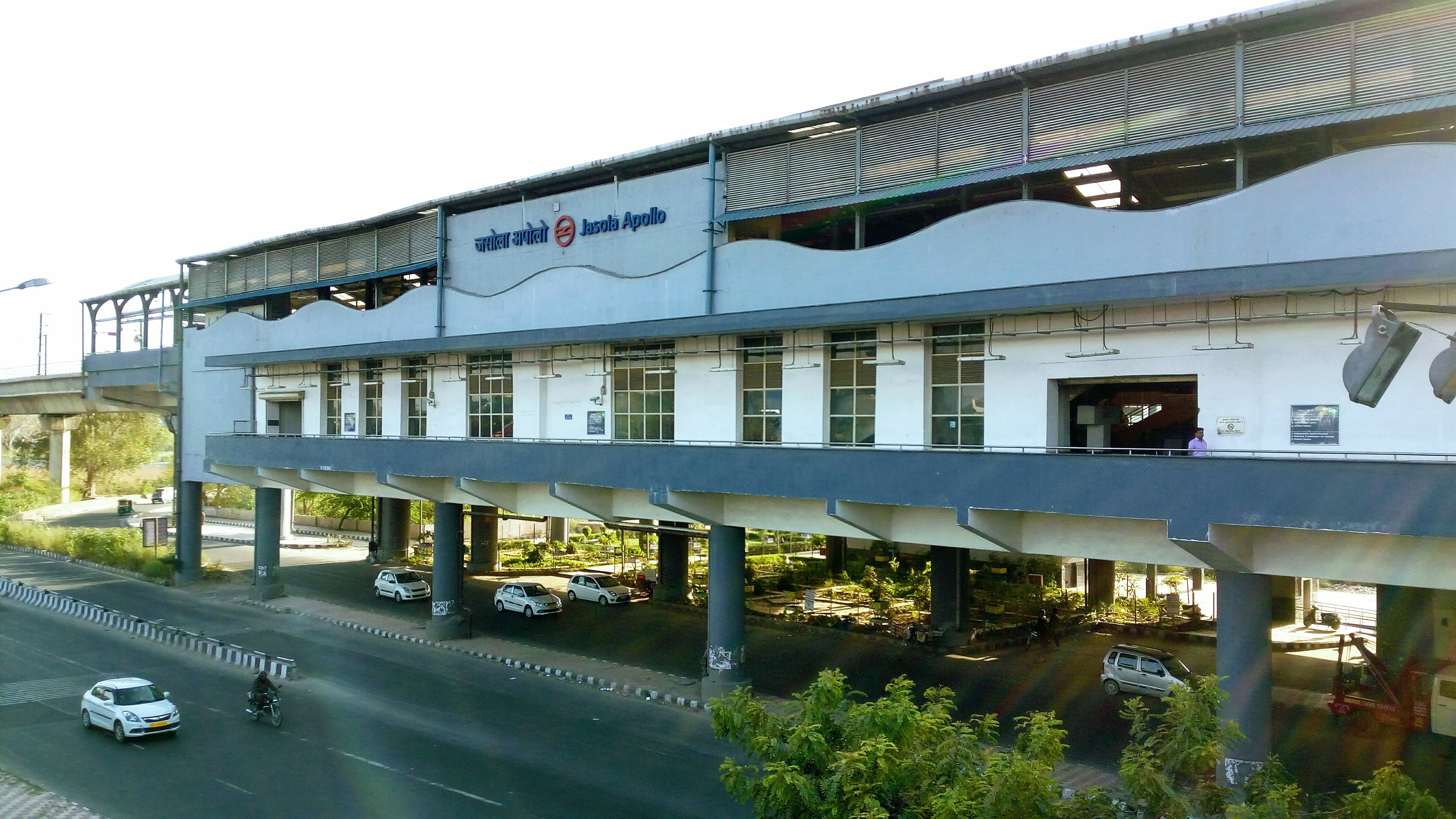
The Jasola Apollo metro station

As the metro has expanded, high ridership on new trains has led to increasing overcrowding and delays. To alleviate the problem, eight-coach trains have been introduced on the Yellow and Blue Lines and more-frequent trains have been proposed. Infrequent, overcrowded and erratic feeder bus services connecting stations to nearby localities have also been a concern. Although the quality and cleanliness of the Delhi Metro have been praised, rising fares have been criticized; fares are higher than those of the bus services the metro replaced. According to a recent study, Delhi Metro fares are the second-most unaffordable among metros charging less than US$0.5 per ride. Another study finds that Delhi Metro may also have a low ridership problem compared to its size and may not be generating the amount of traffic a metro system generates.

=== Feeder buses ===
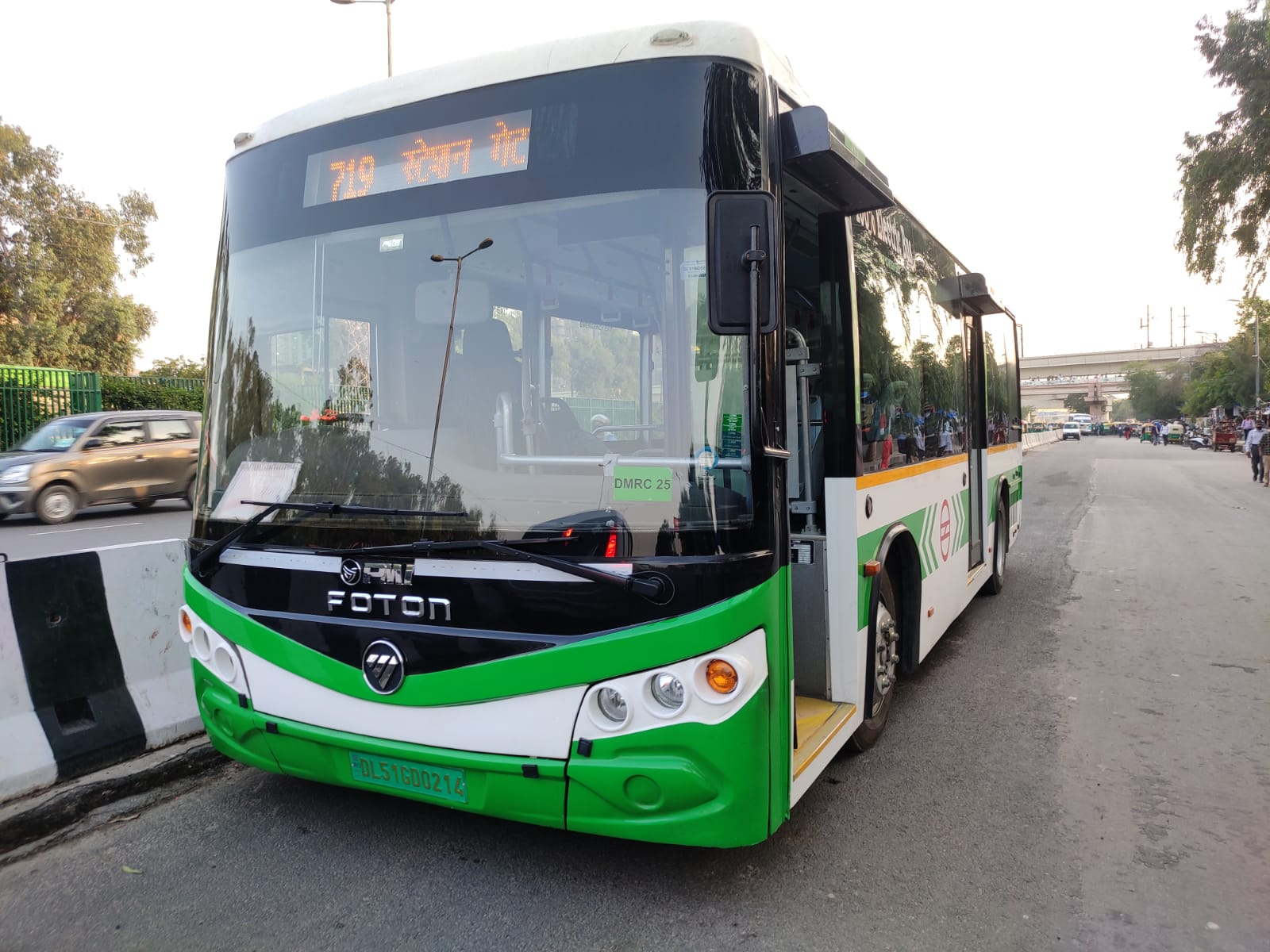
A DMRC electric feeder bus at the Anand Vihar metro station

DMRC began its feeder bus service in 2007 with a fleet of 117 minibuses on 16 routes. In January 2024, it had a fleet of 47 electric feeder buses on five routes to nine metro stations: Kashmere Gate, Gokulpuri, Shastri Park, Laxmi Nagar, East Vinod Nagar - Mayur Vihar-II, Anand Vihar, Dilshad Garden, Vishwavidyalaya, and Guru Tegh Bahadur Nagar. The routes are:

- MC-127: Kashmere Gate to Harsh Vihar
- MC-137: Shastri Park to Mayur Vihar Phase-III
- MC-137 (Mini): Udyog Bhawan to Vanijya Bhawan
- MC-341: Mayur Vihar Phase-III to Harsh Vihar
- ML-06: Vishwavidyalaya to Shankarpura

=== Ridership ===
Note that DMRC reports different metrics versus the daily ridership below. DMRC reports daily passenger journeys: for example, in 2022–23, DMRC reported that average daily passenger journeys were approx 4.63 million per day as compared to 5.16 million per day in 2019-20 (pre-Covid).

Metro service was suspended on 25 March 2020 due to the COVID-19 pandemic. Operations resumed on 12 September 2020, and the average daily ridership fell to 8.78 lakh (0.88 million) in FY 2020–21.

The maximum daily ridership (passenger journeys) of 7.86 million was reported on 18 November 2024.

Average daily ridership
Year	Ridership
2004–05	124,000
2005–06	268,000
2006–07	484,000
2007–08	625,000
2008–09	722,000
2009–10	919,000
2010–11	1,259,000
2011–12	1,660,000
2012–13	1,926,000
2013–14	2,204,908
2014–15	2,402,850
2015–16	2,615,050
2016–17	2,800,792
2017–18	2,587,271
2018–19	2,593,090
2019–20*^	2,780,000
2020–21*^	878,000
2021–22*^	2,516,068
2022–23*^	4,626,592

* Includes Rapid Metro Gurgaon

^ From 2019 onwards the DMRC changed the ridership calculation to count every trip taken by a passenger on a line. This means that a passenger that takes 2 connections will count 3 times towards ridership. This is different from the more standard practice of counting entire journeys applied in other metro systems. Therefore, Delhi Metro reports approximately 55% higher ridership when compared to similar transit systems worldwide.

== Finances ==
=== Summary financials ===
View chart definition.

The Delhi Metro has been operating with a loss in EBT (earnings before taxes) since 2010. Its EBITDA (earnings before interest, taxes, depreciation, and amortization) declined from 73 percent in FY 2007 to 27 percent in FY 2016–17, improved to 30 percent in 2017–18 then fell again in 2020-21 as ridership fell during the pandemic. The metro began a naming policy for stations in 2014, awarded by an open e-tendering process, to generate non-fare revenue.

=== Funding and capitalisation ===
DMRC is owned by the Government of the National Capital Territory of Delhi and the Government of India. Total debt was ₹291.5 billion (US$3.1 billion) in March 2016, and equity capital was ₹239.9 billion (US$2.6 billion). The cost of the debt is zero percent for Union Government and Delhi Government loans, and from 0.01 and 2.3 percent for Japan International Cooperation Agency (JICA) loans. On 31 March 2016, ₹193.1 billion (US$2.1 billion) was paid-up capital; the rest is reserves and surplus.

== Depots ==
As of March 2026, the Delhi Metro has 16 operational depots, with 3 more under construction.

Delhi Metro Depots
Line	Line name	Number of operational depots	Location	Opening date
1	Red Line	1	Shastri Park	25 December 2002
1	Red Line	1	Narela	Under construction
2	Yellow Line	3	Khyber Pass	20 December 2004
2	Yellow Line	3	Sultanpur	21 June 2010
2	Yellow Line	3	Samaypur Badli - Siraspur	28 May 2020
3 / 4	Blue Line	2	Najafgarh	31 December 2005
3 / 4	Blue Line	2	Yamuna Bank	10 May 2009
5	Green Line	2	Mundka	2 April 2010
5	Green Line	2	Modern Industrial Estate, Bahadurgarh	24 June 2018
6	Violet Line	2	Sarita Vihar	3 October 2010
6	Violet Line	2	Neelam Chowk Ajronda	6 September 2015
-	Airport Express	1	Dwarka Sector 21	23 February 2011
7	Pink Line	2	Mukundpur	14 March 2018
7	Pink Line	2	Vinod Nagar - Ghazipur	31 October 2018
8	Magenta Line	2	Kalindi Kunj - Jasola Vihar	25 December 2017
8	Magenta Line	2	Mukundpur	8 March 2026
8	Magenta Line	2	Mangolpuri	Under construction
8	Magenta Line	2	Indraprastha	Under construction
9	Grey Line	1	Najafgarh	4 October 2019
10	Golden Line	1	Sarita Vihar	Under construction

Some depots, such as Shastri Park and Yamuna Bank, are near their respective at-grade station complexes; others, such as Sarita Vihar and Mundka, are joined indirectly to the main line. The Najafgarh depot is unique in housing both broad gauge and standard gauge trains from the Blue and Grey Lines, respectively; the Sarita Vihar depot will house Violet and Golden Line trains in the future. The Phase III Kalindi Kunj and Vinod Nagar depots were built differently due to land-acquisition issues; the former has an extra elevated stabling yard adjacent to the Jasola Vihar - Shaheen Bagh station, and the latter has two sub-depots (one with two floors). An elevated stabling yard was also built adjacent to the Noida Electronic City station, but it is not considered a depot. As part of Phase IV, the Mukundpur depot will be expanded to accommodate the Pink and Magenta Lines without land-acquisition issues.

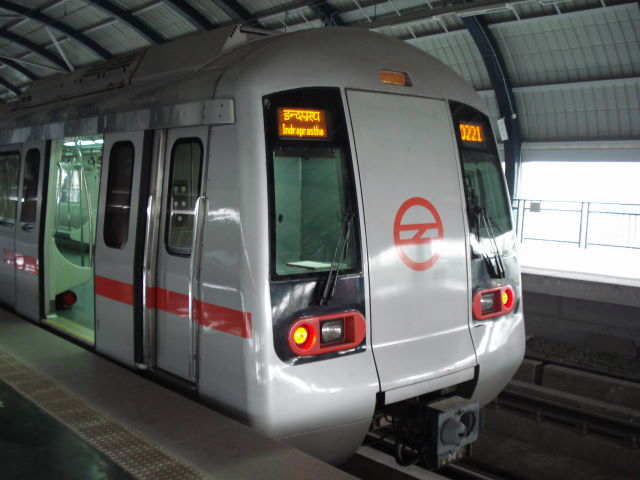
A Phase I broad-gauge Mitsubishi Corporation–BEML train

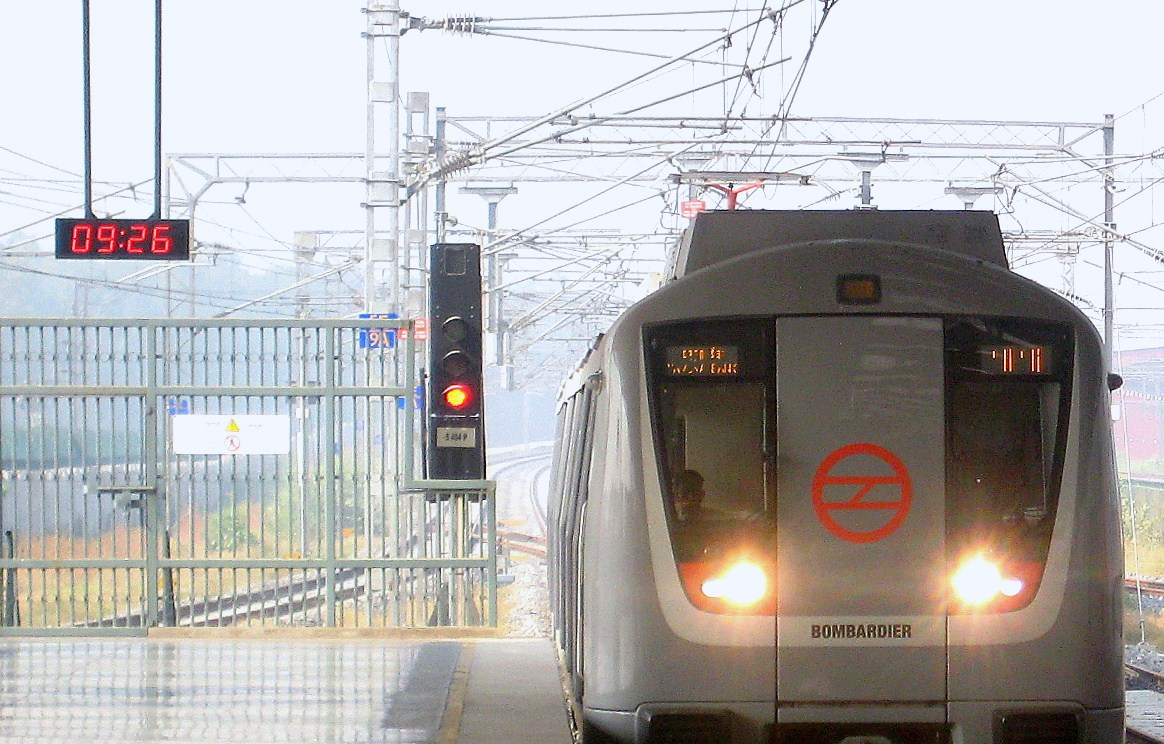
A Phase II broad-gauge Bombardier train

The metro has two rail gauges. Phase I lines have 5 ft 6 in (1,676 mm) broad gauge rolling stock, while all the newer lines have 1,435 mm (4 ft 8 1/2 in) rolling stock. As mentioned in the above table, trains are maintained at 15 depots across Delhi. Maglev trains were considered for some Phase III lines, but DMRC decided to continue with conventional rail in August 2012.

By 31 March 2015, the company had a total of 1,306 coaches (220 trains). In addition to line extensions, two new lines (7 and 8) were proposed in Phase III. Unattended train operation (UTO) will be in 486 coaches (81 six-car trains). An additional 258 broad-gauge (BG) coaches for Lines 1 to 4 and 138 standard-gauge (SG) coaches for Lines 5 and 6 were proposed. At the end of Phase III, there would be 2,188 coaches (333 trains). Except for a few four-car trains on Line 5, 93 percent of the trains would have a six- or eight-car configuration at the end of Phase III.

=== Broad gauge ===
Rolling stock is provided by two major suppliers. Phase I rolling stock was supplied by a consortium of companies (Hyundai Rotem, Mitsubishi Corporation, and MELCO). The coaches look similar to the MTR Rotem EMU, but have only four doors; sliding doors, instead of plug doors, are used. The coaches were initially built in South Korea by Rotem, then in Bangalore by BEML through a technology transfer arrangement. The trains consist of four lightweight 3.2-metre-wide (10 ft 6 in) stainless-steel coaches with vestibules (permitting movement throughout them) and can carry up to 1,500 passengers, with 50 seated and 330 standing passengers per coach. The coaches are air-conditioned, equipped with automatic doors, microprocessor-controlled brakes and secondary air suspension, and can maintain an average speed of 32 km/h (20 mph) over a distance of 1.1 km (0.68 mi). The system is extendable to eight coaches, and platforms have been designed accordingly.

Phase II rolling stock is supplied by Bombardier Transportation, which received an order for 614 cars at a cost of about US$1.1 billion. Although the initial trains were made in Görlitz, Germany and Sweden, the remainder will be built at Bombardier's factory in Savli (near Vadodara). The four- and six-car trains have a capacity of 1,178 and 1,792 commuters each, respectively. Coaches have closed-circuit television (CCTV) cameras with eight-hour backup, chargers for cell phones and laptops, and improved climate control.

=== Standard gauge ===
Standard-gauge rolling stock is manufactured by BEML at its factory in Bangalore, and most of these trains are supplied to BEML by Hyundai Rotem. The four-car trains have a capacity of 1,506 passengers, accommodating 50 seated and 292 standing passengers in each coach. The trains, with CCTV cameras in and outside the coaches, chargers for mobile phones and laptops, improved climate control and microprocessor-controlled disc brakes, will be capable of maintaining an average speed of 34 km/h (21 mph) over a distance of 1.1 km (0.68 mi).

=== Airport Express ===
Eight six-car trains supplied by CAF were imported from Spain. CAF held five-percent equity in the DAME project, and Reliance Infrastructure held the remaining 95 percent before DMRC took over operations. Trains on this line have noise reduction and padded fabric seats. Coaches are equipped with LCD screens for entertainment and flight information. Trains have an event recorder which can withstand high levels of temperature and impact, and wheels have a flange-lubrication system for reduced noise and improved comfort.

== Signaling and telecommunication ==
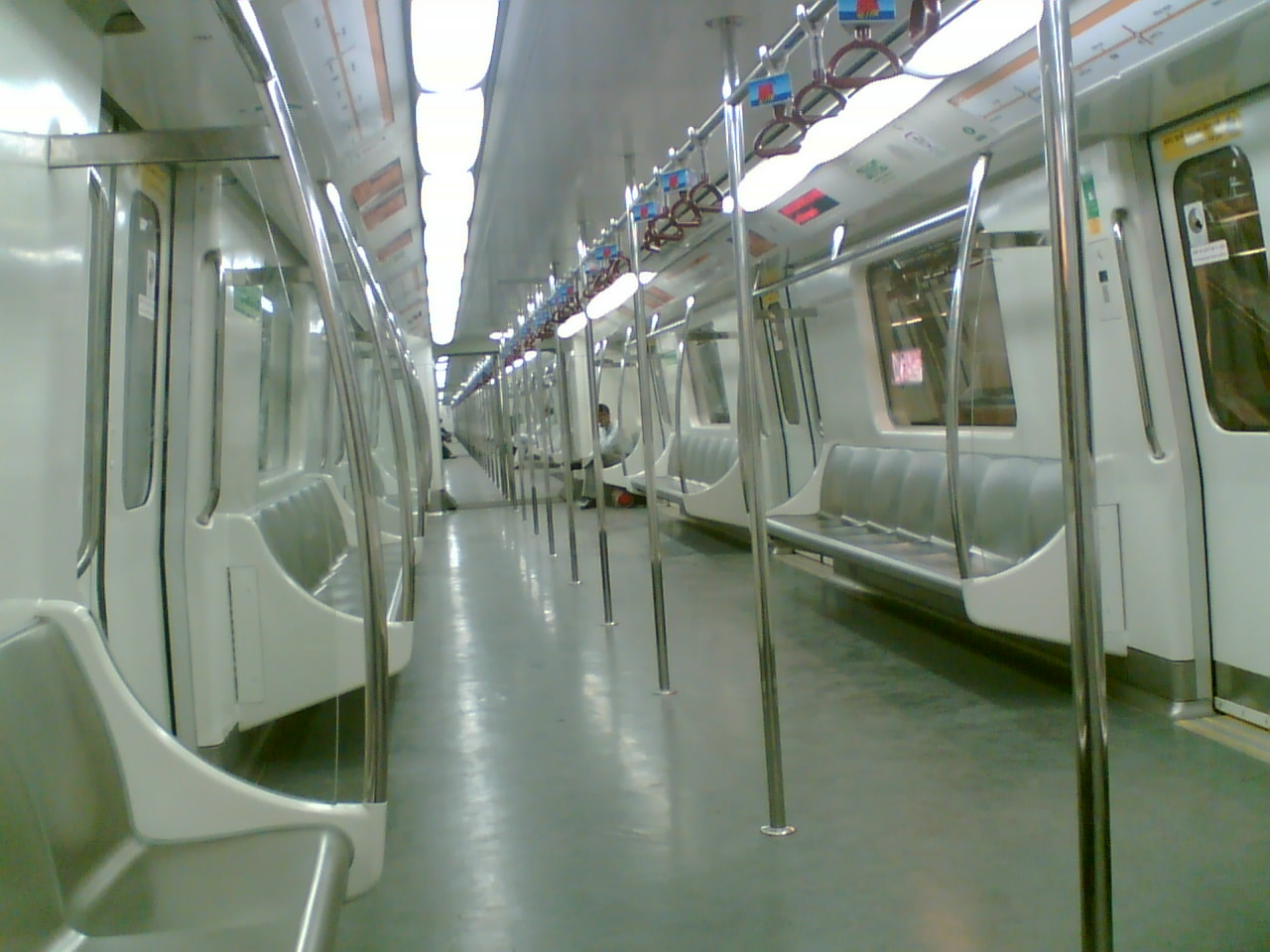
Interior of a Mitsubishi Corporation coach

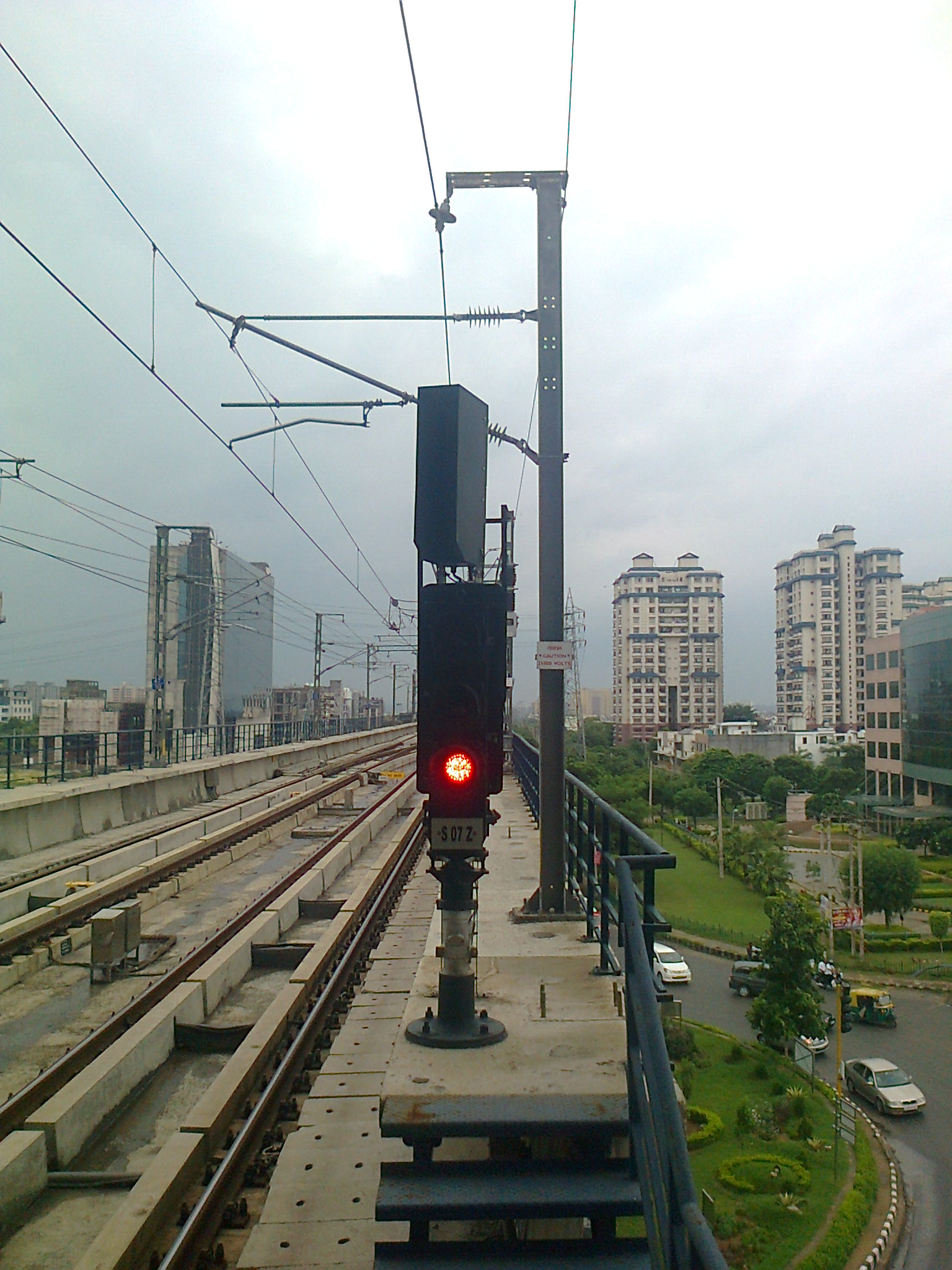
Metro signal

The metro uses cab signaling with a centralised automatic train control system consisting of automatic operation, protection and signaling modules. A 380 MHz digital trunked TETRA radio communication system from Motorola Solutions is used on all lines to carry voice and data information. For the Blue Line, Siemens supplied the electronic interlocking Sicas, the Vicos OC 500 operation-control system and the LZB 700 M automation-control system. An integrated system with optical fibre cable, on-train radio, CCTV, and a centralised clock and public address system is used for telecommunication during normal operations and emergencies. Alstom supplied the signaling system for the Red and Yellow Lines, and Bombardier Transportation supplied its CITYFLO 350 signaling system for the Green and Violet Lines.

The Airport Express line introduced WiFi service at all its stations on 13 January 2012. Connectivity in trains is expected in the future. WiFi service is provided by YOU Broadband and Cable India. In August 2017, Wifi service began at all the 50 stations of the Blue Line. A fully automated, operator-less train system was offered to the metro by the French technology firm Thales.

== Environment and aesthetics ==
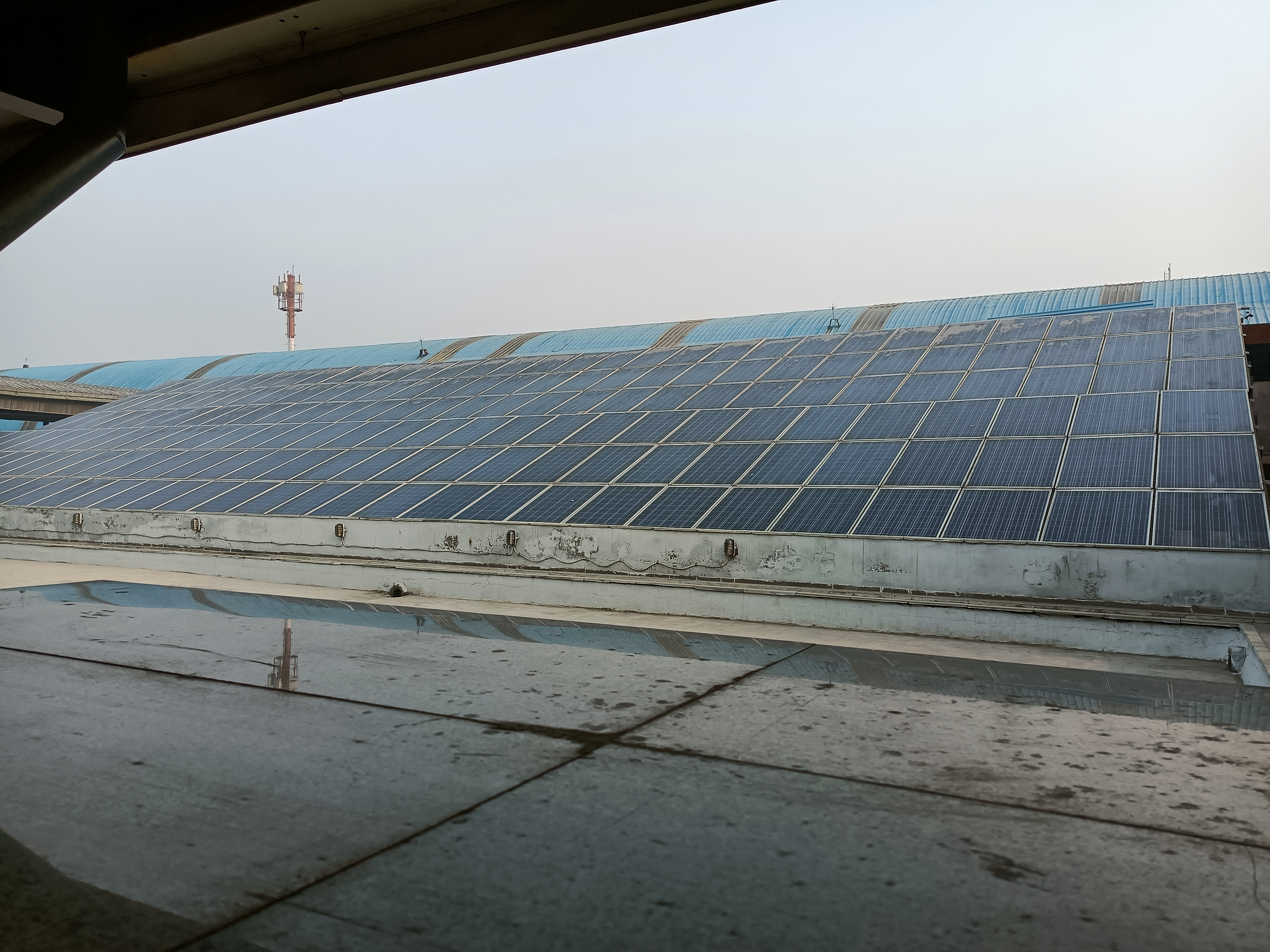
A rooftop solar-power system at the Anand Vihar metro station

The metro has received awards for environmentally-friendly practices from organisations including the United Nations, RINA, and the International Organization for Standardization; it is the second metro in the world, after the New York City Subway, to be ISO 14001 certified for environmentally-friendly construction. By March 2023, 64 metro stations, four sections on the central verge between piers, and 12 other Phase I and II locations on the network have rainwater harvesting for environmental protection; all 27 Phase-IV elevated stations will also harvest rainwater, and 52 recharge pits are being constructed for this purpose. It is the world's first railway project to earn carbon credits after being registered with the United Nations under the UN's Clean Development Mechanism, and has earned 400,000 carbon credits with the regenerative braking systems on its trains.

DMRC installed the metro's first rooftop solar power plant at the Dwarka Sector-21 station in 2014. The network received 35 percent of its energy from renewable sources by April 2023, which it intends to increase to 50 percent by 2031. Of this, 30 percent comes from the Rewa Ultra Mega Solar park in Madhya Pradesh; four percent (50 MWp) comes from rooftop solar panels, and one percent comes from a waste-to-energy plant in Ghazipur. As of April 2023, DMRC had installed solar panels at 142 locations: 15 depots, 93 stations, and 34 other buildings.

The metro has been promoted as an integral part of community infrastructure, and artwork depicting the local way of life has been displayed at stations. Students at local art colleges have designed murals at metro stations, and the viaduct pillars of some elevated sections have been decorated with mosaic murals created by local schoolchildren. The metro station at INA Colony has a gallery of artwork and handicrafts from across India, and all stations on the Central Secretariat – Qutub Minar section of the Yellow Line have panels depicting Delhi's architectural heritage. The Nobel Memorial Wall at Rajiv Chowk has portraits of the seven Indian Nobel laureates: Rabindranath Tagore, CV Raman, Hargobind Khorana, Mother Teresa, Subrahmanyan Chandrasekhar, Amartya Sen and Venkatraman Ramakrishnan.

== In popular culture ==
A number of films have been shot in the Delhi Metro; the first was Bewafaa in November 2005. Delhi-6, Love Aaj Kal, PK, and Paa also have scenes filmed inside Delhi Metro trains and stations. Bang Bang! was filmed near the Mayur Vihar Extension metro station in March 2014, and the 2019 film War was filmed in the metro.

== See also ==
- Urban rail transit in India
- Delhi Suburban Railway
- Transport in Delhi
  - National Capital Region Transport Corporation
  - Delhi Transport Corporation
- List of suburban and commuter rail systems
- Lists of urban rail transit systems
- List of metro systems
- Metro Tunneling Group
