= Metro Tunneling Group =

Contractors in India

Metro Tunneling Group or MTG (formerly IMCC-JV) is a Joint Venture (JV) of 5 companies currently working as the main contractor for the Delhi Metro Rail Corporation (DMRC). The 5 companies are DYWIDAG Systems from Germany, Larsen & Toubro from India, Samsung Corporation from South Korea, Ircon International from India, and Shimizu Corporation from Japan. DMRC is the joint venture of Government of India and Government of Delhi.

On 19 December 2006, the international joint venture - Metro Tunneling Group received the Letter of Acceptance from Delhi Metro Rail Corporation for the Contract BC18. The scope of work for the new contract includes the design and civil works for a 3.1 km long metro twin tunnel and two underground metro stations. Within the construction period of 36 month the tunnel will be built by Shield TBM whereas the stations will be constructed using the cut and cover method.

== History ==
The Phase I of Delhi Metro was divided into 2 civil packages by the DMRC: MC1A and MC1B. MC1A (Vishwavidyalaya to Kashmere Gate) was awarded to KSHI-JV and MC1B (Chandni Chowk to Central Secretariat) was awarded to IMCC-JV.

== IMCC-JV ==
MTG previously known as IMCC (International Metro Civil Contractors). In April 2001 the international joint venture "International Metro Civil Contractors" (IMCC) was awarded the contract for the design and construction of an approx. 6.5 km long underground section underneath the centre of Old and New Delhi.

The joint venture under the leadership of DYWIDAG International GmbH (Germany), together with Larsen & Toubro (India), Samsung Corporation (Korea), IRCON International (India) and Shimizu Corporation (Japan), who successfully completed the turn-key contract MC-1B for a 6.5 km metro twin tunnel system and 6 metro stations of the extension of the Metro Delhi in June 2005, 8 months ahead of the originally scheduled termination date.

During the Phase-I of the Delhi Metro, the JV has completed the Rs 1,940-crore plan of underground Metro Rail Corridor (6 stations) from Chandni Chowk to Central Secretariat including tunnel between Chandni Chowk and Kashmere Gate.

The scope of work of this US$380 m contract consists of a twin tunnel system including six underground stations, of which five are open-cut stations and one station in tunnel using New Austrian Tunneling method (NATM). To complete the seven km bored tunnel sections between stations, the joint venture has bought three Herrenknecht tunnel boring machines – two earth pressure balance machines (EPBM) and one hard rock shield machine. The first machine was launched in March 2002.

Whilst most of the project lies in the Delhi Silts, the section in the area of Old Delhi is situated in the bedrock, which rises up to almost ground level. Because of these ground conditions and the extremely congested locality, the 300 m long Chawri Bazar Station in the centre of Old Delhi cannot be constructed by open-cut, but must be excavated exclusively using the NATM. This is done from an access shaft, 25 x 40 m, with four NATM drives, with a diameter of 10 m each. All are progressing simultaneously parallel to the works for the shaft building, using both hydraulic excavators and smooth blasting techniques.

During the entire tunneling activities ground movements have been documented and controlled using an extensive monitoring programme installed both inside the tunnels and above ground. A large number of specialized instruments have been installed to monitor ground movements and strains in the surrounding structures.

In addition to civil and structural works the design-build contract also includes station air conditioning, tunnel ventilation, station E&M services, lighting, station finishes and landscaping.

Source: DYWIDAG International GmbH
