= DYWIDAG Systems =

DYWIDAG Systems (DSI) is a global technology group in the construction and mining sectors. The DSI Holding GmbH is based in Munich.
