= Mangu Singh =

Managing Director Of Delhi Metro Rail Corporation

Dr. Mangu Singh (born 15 December 1955) was the managing director of Delhi Metro Rail Corporation, He took over after Dr.E. Sreedharan, the former managing director, retired from service on 31 December 2011, he retired on 31 March 2022, succeeded by Vikas Kumar. He is an Indian Railways Service of Engineers (IRSE) officer of the 1981 batch.

== Personal life ==
Singh was born in a small village of Uttar Pradesh called Alawalpur Nainu near Najibabad, District- Bijnor. Singh received his early education from his native place and later graduated in civil engineering from University of Roorkee (now IIT Roorkee) in 1979 . He also received Master of Science (sustainable development). He has been Awarded D.Sc. (Honoris Causa) by Amity University, India and D.Lit. (Honoris Causa) by Modi University, India . He has been awarded prestigious Sat Paul Mittal Award for Public Service – 2017.

== Education ==
He is a B.E (civil) from University of Roorkee (now IIT Roorkee) of 1979 batch.

== Career ==
Singh joined Indian Railway Service of Engineers (IRSE), in March 1983 through the 1981 UPSC Indian Engineering Services (IES) Examination. After training he held various positions on Indian Railways from 1983 to 1997 including in Kolkata Metro Railway.

Singh joined Delhi Metro Rail Corporation at inception in November 1997 in the capacity of Chief Engineer/Chief Project Manager and moved upwards to executive director and then Director (Works). He has been instrumental in construction of Metro Network in Delhi at record pace of construction. Currently a network of more than 390 km. is operational. He also assisted other State Governments in developing metro systems in cities like Mumbai, Bangalore, Chennai, Hyderabad, Kolkata East-West Line, Lucknow, Jaipur, Kochi, Ahmdabad, etc..

Singh has also headed the Clean Development Mechanism (CDM) projects of Delhi Metro, the first successful projects in Railway Transportation System in the world. Singh is the recipient of National Award (Railway Week Award 1996) for his contribution in completing the Kolkata Metro Rail Project, Distinguished Alumni Award -IIT (Roorkee) 2016 Distinguished Alumnus Award-National Academy of Indian Railway, Vadodara -2020 and Engineer of the Year Award 2012 by IEI. He is a member of Fellow Institution of Engineers (India) and National Academy of Engineering, India. He has also been awarded the 'Green Champion' by Indian Green Building Council.

Singh has published/presented many technical papers in National and International Journals/Conferences etc.

Singh is Founder President, Tunneling Association of India. He is also Member of Policy Board of UITP (International Association of Public Transport).
