= Raj Bagh metro station =

Metro station in Uttar Pradesh, India

Raj Bagh

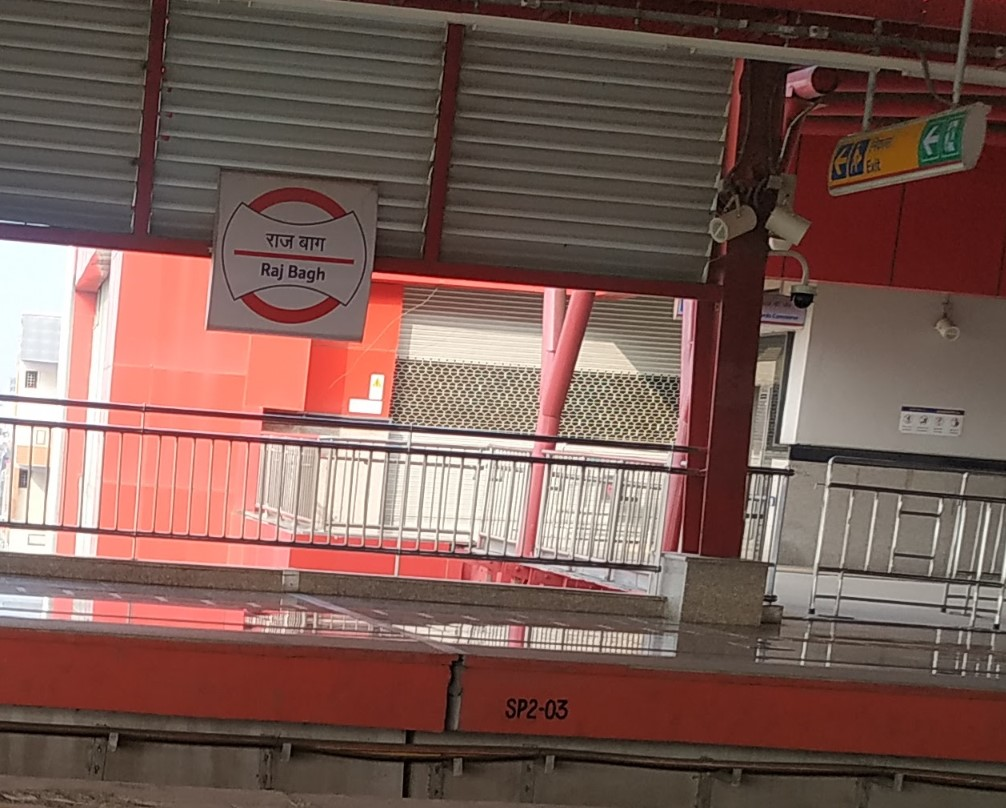

General information
- Location: GT Road, Sahibabad Industrial Area, Raj Bagh, Ghaziabad, Uttar Pradesh 201005
- Coordinates: 28°40′37″N 77°20′48″E
- System: Delhi Metro station
- Owner: Delhi Metro Rail Corporation
- Line: Red Line
- Platforms: Side platform Platform-1 → Rithala; Platform-2 → Shaheed Sthal (New Bus Adda)
- Tracks: 2

Construction
- Structure type: Elevated
- Platform levels: 2
- Accessible: Yes

Other information
- Station code: RJBH

History
- Opened: 8 March 2019
- Electrified: 25 kV 50 Hz AC through overhead catenary

Services
Preceding station	Delhi Metro	Following station
Shaheed Nagar towards Rithala	Red Line	Major Mohit Sharma Rajendra Nagar towards Shaheed Sthal (New Bus Adda)
Route map
Location

Raj Bagh is an elevated metro station on the Red Line of the Delhi Metro, located in the Sahibabad Industrial Area of Ghaziabad, Uttar Pradesh.

Raj Bagh station was inaugurated on 8 March 2019 as part of the Dilshad Garden–Shaheed Sthal extension of the Red Line. Passenger services commenced on 9 March 2019.

== Station layout ==
L2	Side platform | Doors will open on the left
L2	Platform 2 Eastbound	Towards → Shaheed Sthal (New Bus Adda); Next Station: Major Mohit Sharma Rajendra Nagar
L2	Platform 1 Westbound	Towards ← Rithala; Next Station: Shaheed Nagar
L2	Side platform | Doors will open on the left
L1	Concourse	Fare control, station agent, Metro Card vending machines, crossover
G	Street Level	Exit/Entrance

== See also ==
- List of Delhi Metro stations
- Transport in Delhi
- Delhi Metro Rail Corporation
- Delhi Suburban Railway
- List of rapid transit systems in India
- Delhi Transport Corporation
- List of Metro Systems
