= Pratap Nagar metro station =

Metro station in Delhi, India

Pratap Nagar

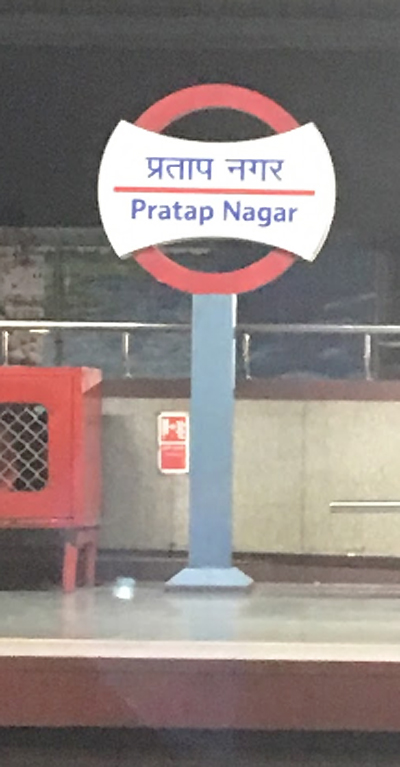
- Pratap Nagar metro station

General information
- Location: Vir Banda Bairagi Marg, near Gulabi Bagh, Pratap Nagar, Delhi, 110007
- Coordinates: 28°40′00″N 77°11′56″E
- System: Delhi Metro station
- Owner: Delhi Metro Rail Corporation
- Line: Red Line
- Platforms: Side platform Platform-1 → Rithala; Platform-2 → Shaheed Sthal (New Bus Adda)
- Tracks: 2
- Connections: Subzi Mandi & Delhi Kishanganj

Construction
- Structure type: Elevated
- Platform levels: 2
- Parking: Available
- Accessible: Yes

Other information
- Station code: PRA

History
- Opened: 3 October 2003; 22 years ago
- Electrified: 25 kV 50 Hz AC through overhead catenary

Passengers
- Jan 2015: 11,874 /day 368,095/ Month average

Services
Preceding station	Delhi Metro	Following station
Shastri Nagar towards Rithala	Red Line	Pul Bangash towards Shaheed Sthal (New Bus Adda)
Route map
Location

The Pratap Nagar metro station is located on the Red Line of the Delhi Metro. It is within walking distance to the Indian Railways Subzi Mandi railway station and Delhi Kishanganj railway station.

== Station layout ==
L2	Side platform | Doors will open on the left
L2	Platform 2 Eastbound	Towards → Shaheed Sthal (New Bus Adda); Next Station: Pul Bangash
L2	Platform 1 Westbound	Towards ← Rithala; Next Station: Shastri Nagar
L2	Side platform | Doors will open on the left
L1	Concourse	Fare control, station agent, Metro Card vending machines, crossover
G	Street Level	Exit/Entrance

== Facilities ==
List of available ATM at Pratap Nagar metro station are

== See also ==
- List of Delhi Metro stations
- Transport in Delhi
- Delhi Metro Rail Corporation
- Delhi Suburban Railway
- List of rapid transit systems in India
