= Mohan Nagar metro station =

Metro station in Uttar Pradesh, India

Mohan Nagar

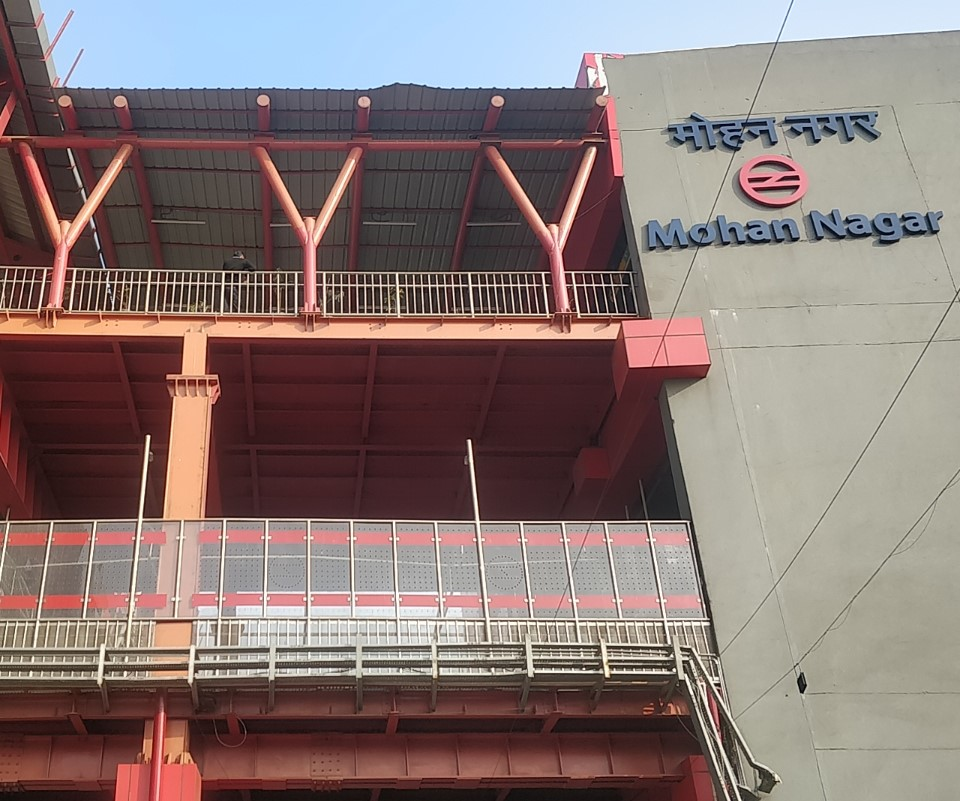

General information
- Location: GT Road, Mohan Nagar, Ghaziabad, Uttar Pradesh
- Coordinates: 28°40′43″N 77°23′02″E
- System: Delhi Metro station
- Owner: Delhi Metro Rail Corporation
- Line: Red Line Blue Line
- Platforms: Side platform Platform-1 → Rithala; Platform-2 → Shaheed Sthal (New Bus Adda)
- Tracks: 2

Construction
- Structure type: Elevated
- Platform levels: 2
- Accessible: Yes

Other information
- Station code: MNGM

History
- Opened: 8 March 2019
- Electrified: 25 kV 50 Hz AC through overhead catenary

Services
Preceding station	Delhi Metro	Following station
Shyam Park towards Rithala	Red Line	Arthala towards Shaheed Sthal (New Bus Adda)
Route map
Location

Mohan Nagar is an elevated metro station on the Red Line of the Delhi Metro, located in the Sahibabad Industrial Area of Ghaziabad, Uttar Pradesh. It commenced passenger operations on 9 March 2019 as part of the 9.6 kilometres (6.0 mi) Dilshad Garden–Shaheed Sthal (New Bus Adda) extension of the Red Line.

The station is situated near World Square Mall, Narendra Mohan Hospital, ITS College and the Mohan Nagar industrial area. It also provides access to the nearby Mohan Nagar bus stand and the inter-state bus stand, serving as a transport point for commuters travelling to different parts of Ghaziabad and the adjoining areas.

Mohan Nagar has been proposed as an interchange station between the Red Line and an extension of the Blue Line from Vaishali. The proposed corridor has undergone several revisions and faced delays due to funding and planning issues. In July 2025, DMRC sought in-principle approval from the Ghaziabad Development Authority to prepare a fresh detailed project report for a 4 kilometres (2.5 mi) elevated extension between Mohan Nagar and Vaishali, featuring four stations.

== History ==
The Dilshad Garden–New Bus Adda extension of the Red Line, which includes Mohan Nagar station, was developed under an agreement between the Ghaziabad Development Authority (GDA) and the Delhi Metro Rail Corporation (DMRC) signed in June 2014. Initial trial runs on the 9.6 kilometres (6.0 mi) elevated corridor began in August 2018. The extension was inaugurated by Prime Minister Narendra Modi on 8 March 2019, and commercial passenger services commenced the following day, 9 March 2019, at 8:00 a.m.

== Station layout ==
L2	Side platform | Doors will open on the left
L2	Platform 2 Eastbound	Towards → Shaheed Sthal (New Bus Adda); Next Station: Arthala
L2	Platform 1 Westbound	Towards ← Rithala; Next Station: Shyam Park
L2	Side platform | Doors will open on the left
L1	Concourse	Fare control, station agent, Metro Card vending machines, crossover
G	Street Level	Exit/Entrance

== Facilities ==
Nearby landmarks include World Square Mall and Narendra Mohan Hospital and Heart Centre. The station also provides access to the Institute of Technology and Science (ITS), Mohan Nagar, and the surrounding Anand Industrial Area.

== See also ==
- List of Delhi Metro stations
- Transport in Delhi
- Delhi Metro Rail Corporation
- Delhi Suburban Railway
- List of rapid transit systems in India
- Delhi Transport Corporation
- List of Metro Systems
- National Capital Region (India)
- Ghaziabad district, Uttar Pradesh
