= Mansarovar Park metro station =

Metro station in Delhi, India

Mansarovar Park

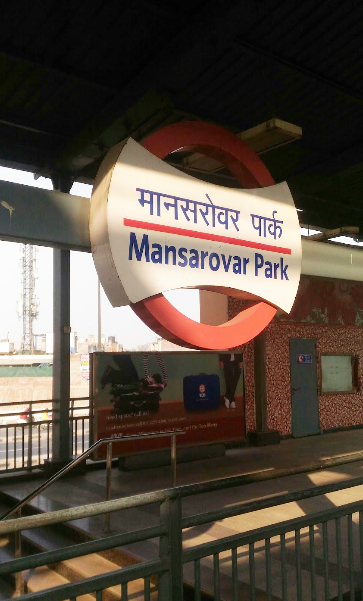
- Mansarovar Park metro station

General information
- Location: Shahdara Flyover, Mansarovar Park, Shahdara, New Delhi, Delhi,110095
- Coordinates: 28°40′31″N 77°18′06″E
- System: Delhi Metro station
- Owner: Delhi Metro Rail Corporation
- Line: Red Line
- Platforms: Side platform Platform-1 → Rithala; Platform-2 → Shaheed Sthal (New Bus Adda)
- Tracks: 2

Construction
- Structure type: Elevated
- Platform levels: 2
- Parking: Available
- Accessible: Yes

Other information
- Station code: MPK

History
- Opened: 4 June 2008; 18 years ago
- Electrified: 25 kV 50 Hz AC through overhead catenary

Passengers
- Jan 2015: 5,381 /day 166,796/ Month average

Services
Preceding station	Delhi Metro	Following station
Shahdara towards Rithala	Red Line	Jhilmil towards Shaheed Sthal (New Bus Adda)
Route map
Location

The Mansarovar Park metro station is located on the Red Line of the Delhi Metro, India.

== Station layout ==
L2	Side platform | Doors will open on the left
L2	Platform 2 Eastbound	Towards → Shaheed Sthal (New Bus Adda); Next Station: Jhilmil
L2	Platform 1 Westbound	Towards ← Rithala; Next Station: Shahdara
L2	Side platform | Doors will open on the left
L1	Concourse	Fare control, station agent, Metro Card vending machines, crossover
G	Street Level	Exit/Entrance

== Facilities ==
A Punjab National Bank ATM and Sulabh Toilets are available at this station along with DMRC authorised parking.

== See also ==
- List of Delhi Metro stations
- Transport in Delhi
- Delhi Metro Rail Corporation
- Delhi Suburban Railway
- List of rapid transit systems in India
