= Jhilmil metro station =

Metro station in Delhi, India

Jhilmil

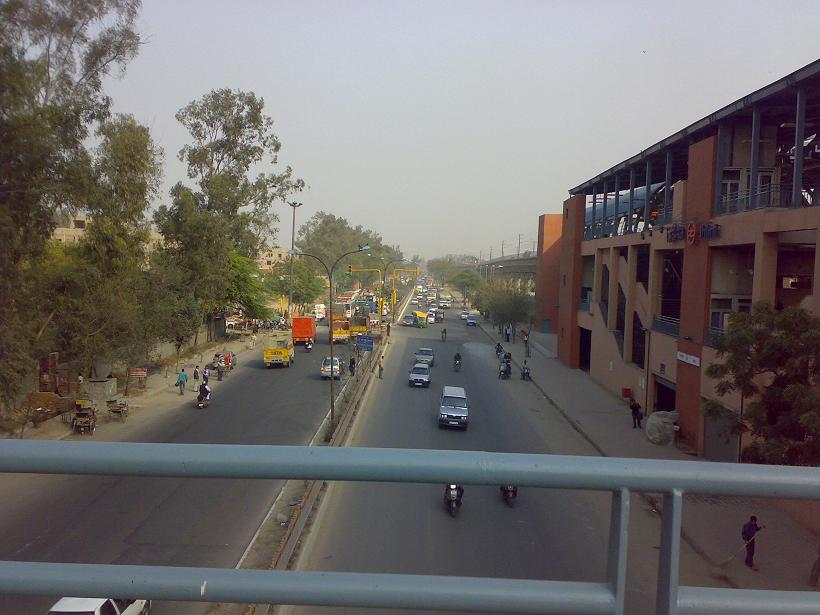
- Jhilmil station located on the right

General information
- Location: Grand Trunk Road, Jhilmil Industrial Area, Jhilmil, New Delhi, Delhi,110095
- Coordinates: 28°40′33″N 77°18′45″E
- System: Delhi Metro station
- Owner: Delhi Metro Rail Corporation
- Line: Red Line
- Platforms: Side platform Platform-1 → Rithala; Platform-2 → Shaheed Sthal (New Bus Adda)
- Tracks: 2

Construction
- Structure type: Elevated
- Platform levels: 2
- Parking: Available
- Accessible: Yes

Other information
- Station code: JLML

History
- Opened: 4 June 2008; 18 years ago
- Electrified: 25 kV 50 Hz AC through overhead catenary

Passengers
- Jan 2015: 9,684 /day 300,212/ Month average

Services
Preceding station	Delhi Metro	Following station
Mansarovar Park towards Rithala	Red Line	Dilshad Garden towards Shaheed Sthal (New Bus Adda)
Route map
Location

The Jhilmil Station is located on the Red Line of the Delhi Metro.

== Station layout ==
L2	Side platform | Doors will open on the left
L2	Platform 2 Eastbound	Towards → Shaheed Sthal (New Bus Adda); Next Station: Dilshad Garden
L2	Platform 1 Westbound	Towards ← Rithala; Next Station: Mansarovar Park
L2	Side platform | Doors will open on the left
L1	Concourse	Fare control, station agent, Metro Card vending machines, crossover
G	Street Level	Exit/Entrance

== Facilities ==
ATMs from Punjab National Bank and State Bank of India are available at Jhilmil metro station.

== See also ==
- List of Delhi Metro stations
- Transport in Delhi
- Delhi Metro Rail Corporation
- Delhi Suburban Railway
- List of rapid transit systems in India
