= Hindon Airport =

Airport serving Ghaziabad, NCR, India

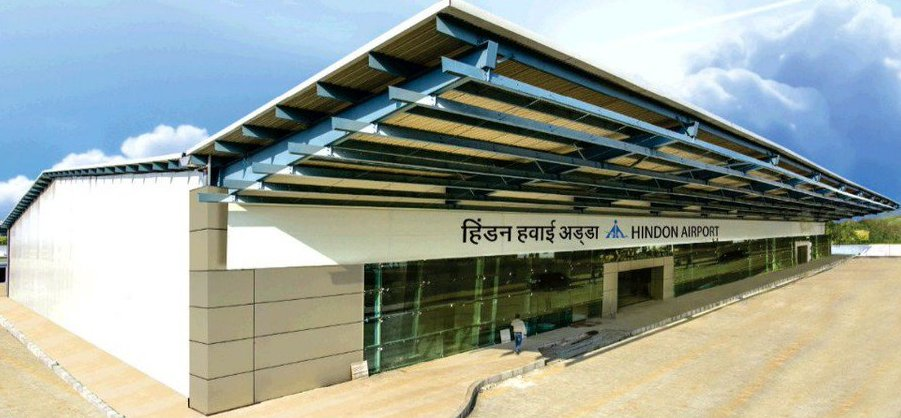
- IATA: HDO; ICAO: VIDX

Summary
- Airport type: Public / Military
- Owner: Indian Air Force
- Operator: Airports Authority of India
- Serves: National Capital Region; Uttar Pradesh
- Location: Ghaziabad, Uttar Pradesh, India
- Elevation AMSL: 700 ft (210 m)
- Coordinates: 28.7057898°N 77.3421373°E
- Website: www.aai.aero/en/airports/hindon

Map
- Location of airport HDO/VIDX (Uttar Pradesh) HDO/VIDX (India)

Runways
Direction	Length		Surface
Direction	ft	m	Surface
09/27	9,000	2,743	Asphalt

Statistics (April 2025 – March 2026)
- Passengers: 1,047,163 (▲1248%)
- Aircraft movements: 9,460 (▲207.14%)
- Cargo tonnage: —
- Source: AAI

Hindon Airport (IATA: HDO, ICAO: VIDX), also spelled Hindan Airport, is a commercial domestic airport and an Indian Air Force base in Ghaziabad, Uttar Pradesh, India, operated by the Airports Authority of India at Hindan Air Force Station of the Indian Air Force. It is the second commercial airport serving the National Capital Region after Indira Gandhi International Airport in Delhi and 20 km from Connaught Place.

The airport was primarily built to handle flights operating under the government's regional connectivity scheme, hence reducing the burden of regional flights from Delhi airport. This Civil Enclave, Hindon is built on 22050 sqm of land area near Sikandarpur village in Sahibabad, adjacent to the IAF airbase. The terminal building is a pre-engineered, air-conditioned structure with eight check-in counters and two conveyor belts. The terminal building has a capacity of 300 PAX per hour. The Indian Air Force is providing air traffic control. The C.E.Hindon has been developed and managed by AAI, and also caters to the needs of VIP and Non-scheduled flight movement. As C.E Hindon is located very close to the national capital Delhi, it suits many of the Scheduled and Non-Scheduled operators who could not get slot allocation at Delhi Airport.

== History ==
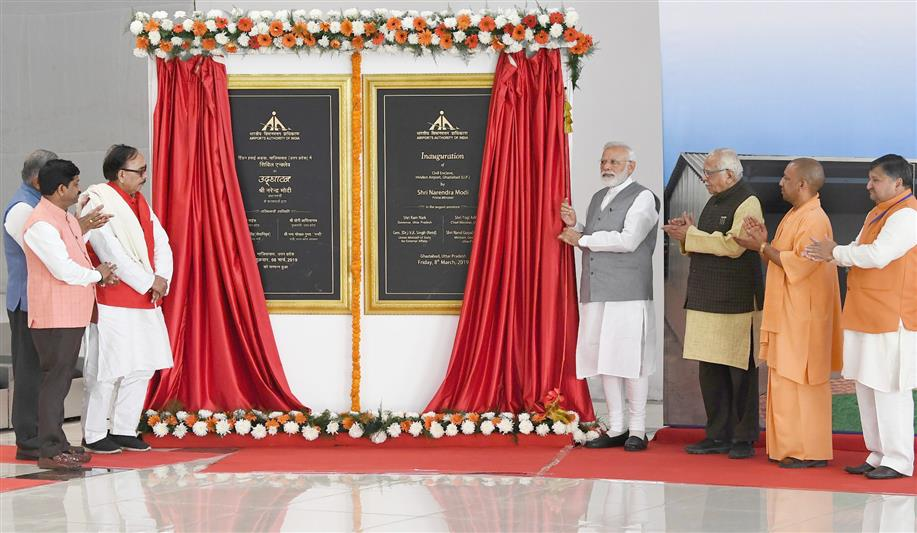
Inauguration of the terminal on 8 March 2019 by Prime Minister Narendra Modi.

=== Civil aviation enclave ===
In 2017, the Ministry of Civil Aviation pre-emptively took up the idea of a civil enclave at Hindon with the IAF because slot constraints at the Indira Gandhi International Airport prevented the operation of flights under the government's Regional Connectivity Scheme called UDAN. The Hindon civil enclave would then become the second airport in the National Capital Region for flights operating under UDAN. Commercial flight operations from an airport within 150 km of Delhi Airport were not allowed, according to an agreement signed between the government and Delhi International Airport Limited (DIAL). Hence, the MoCA made a proposal, seeking clearance from DIAL for the temporary use of Hindon for flights awarded UDAN flights. DIAL approved the proposal in September 2017. When DIAL's on-going expansion of Delhi Airport is completed around September 2022, all UDAN operations would revert to Delhi Airport. The Indian Air Force permitted the Civil Aviation ministry to use the air base for civil operations in August 2017. AAI began construction of the terminal in August 2018. Prime Minister Narendra Modi inaugurated the passenger terminal built at a cost of ₹ 40 crores on 8 March 2019 just before model code of conduct.

The operations from Hindon were expected to begin from 15 March. However, discussions on slot timings with the Indian Air Force regarding slots took longer than expected and the date for commencement of flight operations was pushed back to the first half of October 2019. The first commercial flight from the Hindon took off on 11 October 2019. A Beechcraft King Air, operated by Heritage Aviation under the UDAN scheme, took off for Pithoragarh Airport with nine passengers on board. In May 2019, it was reported that the state government and AAI were considering making the airport permanent.

=== Present status ===
- 2026 May: The Government of Uttar Pradesh and the Airports Authority of India initiated expansion plans for the civilian terminal at Hindon Airport, including acquisition of around 6.8 acres of additional land in Sikandarpur village for terminal expansion, additional parking bays and improved passenger facilities. Around 40 farmers agreed to provide land for the project under the Land Acquisition Act, with compensation at twice the circle rate. Discussions are also underway with the Indian Air Force and AAI regarding the introduction of night landing facilities and increased operational slots.

== Civil aviation services ==
=== Civil enclave within military airbase ===
The Hindon civil enclave was built on 7.5 acres at Sikandarpur village in Sahibabad, adjacent to the existing Indian Airforce airbase. The terminal was developed by AAI while the Uttar Pradesh government built the connecting roads and provides electricity for the project. Air traffic control is provided by the Indian Air Force.

=== Civilian air terminal ===
The terminal building is a pre-engineered, air-conditioned structure with eight check-in counters. The passenger terminal covers an area of 5,425 square metres and has a capacity of serving 300 passengers an hour. The car park can accommodate 90 cars.

== Airlines and destinations ==
Airlines	Destinations
IndiGo	Bengaluru, Chennai, Kolkata, Navi Mumbai, Varanasi
Star Air	Adampur, Kishangarh, Nanded, Mundra.

== Statistics ==
Operations and statistics
Year	Passengers	Aircraft
2019-20	7,877	300
2020-21	12,772	332
2021-22	27,794	710
2022-23	20,560	526
2023-24	3,349	566
2024-25	83,964	3,080
2025-26	11,31,127	9,460

== Transport connectivity ==
=== Last-mile connectivity ===
Following are available to the ISBT, metro stations, railway stations, RRTS stations, and elsewhere.

- Two-wheeler motorbike ride hailing services, such as Rapido, etc. for short distances.
- Three-wheeler auto rickshaw etc for short distances.
- Four-wheeler taxis ride hailing services, such as Uber, etc. for short and longer distances to various cities in nearby states.

=== Bus for long distances from ISBTs ===
Following major Inter-State Bus Terminals (ISBT)s have the long-distance bus services to several states:

- Kashmiri Gate Maharana Pratap ISBT: 18 km southwest of Hindon Airport, reachable by Red Line metro (Dilshad Garden metro station to Kashmere Gate metro station Gate-7 are 7 stops or 16 minutes), serves destinations in Haryana, Rajasthan, Punjab, and Himachal.
- Anand Vihar Swami Vivekanand ISBT: 9 km southwest of Hindon Airport, reachable by Red Line metro, serves destinations in Uttar Pradesh. It is next to the Anand Vihar RRTS metro.
- Sarai Kale Khan ISBT: 21 km southwest of Hindon Airport, reachable by Delhi-Meerut RRTS via Anand Vihar RRTS station, serves destinations in South Haryana, Uttar Pradesh, and eastern Rajasthan.

=== Metro Rail for suburban distances ===
Following metro trains serve the Core NCR (Delhi and other adjacent cities within Delhi Urban agglomeration.

- Existing metro train:
  - Red Line: The closest metro stations are the existing Dilshad Garden metro station and Major Mohit Sharma Rajendra Nagar metro station 5 km south of the airport.
  - Pink Line: Gokulpuri metro station is also located close to the airport to the west of airport.
- Planned metro:
  - Gokulpuri-Hindon Airport-Arthala Pink Line Extension: In September 2024, as part of the Phase-V the DMRC proposed extending the Pink Line 13 km from Trans-Yamuna North-East Delhi (existing Gokulpuri metro station of Red Line metro) to the west Ghaziabad (existing Arthala metro station of Red Line metro) via Hindon Airport connecting 2 existing Red Line metro stations with 10 new Pink Line stations namely Gol Chakkar, DLF, Shalimar Garden, Hindon Airport, Bhopura, Tulsi Niketan, Rajendra Nagar, New Karhaira Colony, Karhaira, and Loni Road Industrial Area.

=== RRTS Rapid Rail for regional NCR distances ===
While metro trains serve the Core NCR, the RRTS connect the Delhi with the following other cities within the Wider NCR region:

- Existing: Delhi–Meerut RRTS
- Future/under-construction:
  - Delhi–Alwar Regional Rapid Transit System
  - Delhi–Panipat Regional Rapid Transit System
  - Ghaziabad–Jewar Regional Rapid Transit System

=== Railways for long distances ===
Railways connect Delhi with the whole India and to the neighbouring countries such as Bangladesh, Bhutan, and Nepal.

- Located Southwest:
  - Delhi Shahdara Junction railway station is the nearest major railway junction 8 km southwest of the Hindon Airport. Delhi Shahdara Junction railway station is also connected to the adjacent Shahdara metro station of Red Line only 1 station west of Dilshad Garden metro station.
  - Delhi Junction railway station (Old Delhi Railway station): 18 km southwest of Hindon airport, closest to the Kashmiri Gate ISBT.
  - New Delhi railway station: 18 km southwest of Hindon airport.
  - Hazrat Nizamuddin railway station: 43 km southwest of Hindon airport.
  - Bijwasan railway station: 43 km southwest of Hindon airport.
- Located Southeast:
  - Ghaziabad Junction railway station: 13 km southeast of Hindon airport on the Kanpur–Delhi section of Howrah–Delhi main line, Howrah–Gaya–Delhi line, "New Delhi-Meerut-Saharanpur line", and "New Delhi–Bareilly–Lucknow line".

=== Roads and highways ===
- Delhi–Dehradun Expressway: to north
- Delhi-Saharanpur NH-709B: to north
- Hisar-Ghaziabad-Pithoragarh NH-9: to west

=== Airports ===
Nearest major civilian airports within the same NCR catchment area are as follows:

- IGI Delhi (IATA: DEL): 33 km southwest reachable via metro (Dilshad Garden to Kashmiri Gate ISBT by Red Line, Kashmiri Gate ISBT to New Delhi by Yellow Line, New Delhi to IGI by Orange Line - total 1 hour), RRTS, rail, bus or taxi.
- Noida International Airport (IATA: DXN): 75 km south, reachable via Yamuna Expressway, buses, rail, taxi, etc.
- Hisar Airport (IATA: HSS): 190 km west reachable via taxi via NH-9, bus from ISBT Kashmiri Gate, and rail from Delhi.

== Issues ==
=== Poor connectivity ===
Hindon Airport's growth is significantly limited by poor last-mile as well as long-distance connectivity. The lack of a co-located centralised multimodal transport hub with the integrated long distance bus terminal (ISBT), direct suburban metro and long-distance rail, etc hinders passengers. They struggle to find direct transport to places like Ghaziabad railway station, face unreliable and expensive cabs, and often rely on inconvenient e-rickshaws and auto rickshaws. Despite the nearby presence of Delhi Metro and Namo Bharat stations, the absence of direct extensions of these rail lines to Hindon Airport continues to be a problem, a situation worsened by the heavy traffic congestion on Wazirabad road. Moreover, the lack of essential direct bus and rail connections to IGI Delhi Airport, as well as the alternative airports in the NCR Plan, namely Noida and Hisar airports, further compounds the connectivity problems.

=== Capacity constraints ===
Hindon civil terminal is facing severe infrastructural limitations with growing passenger traffic due to the lack of aircraft parking bays (currently only two, which has led to flight diversions and cancellations during technical issues or inclement weather), the terminal building constraints (designed for 300 passengers per hour is now handling around 430), night landing is disallowed by IAF due to the security issues.

== See also ==
- List of airports in Uttar Pradesh
- Indira Gandhi International Airport
