= Shastri Nagar metro station =

Metro station in Delhi, India

Shastri Nagar

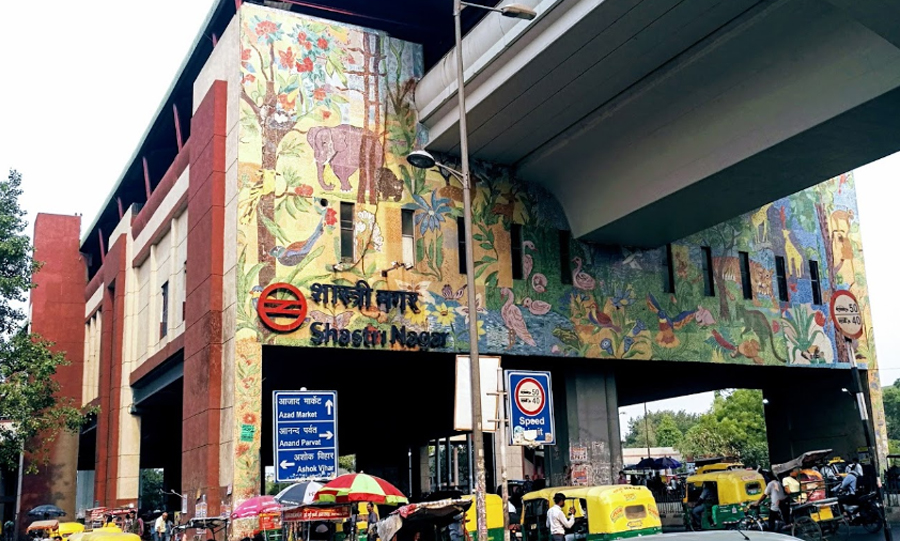
- Shastri Nagar metro station

General information
- Location: shri balaji madical.ltd, E2/202, Block C, Subhadra Colony, Shastri Nagar, New Delhi, Delhi, 110052
- Coordinates: 28°40′12″N 77°10′54″E
- System: Delhi Metro station
- Owner: Delhi Metro Rail Corporation
- Line: Red Line
- Platforms: Side platform Platform-1 → Rithala; Platform-2 → Shaheed Sthal (New Bus Adda)
- Tracks: 2

Construction
- Structure type: Elevated
- Platform levels: 2
- Parking: Available
- Accessible: Yes

Other information
- Station code: SHT

History
- Opened: 3 October 2003; 23 years ago
- Electrified: 25 kV 50 Hz AC through overhead catenary

Passengers
- Jan 2015: 17,006 /day 527,195/ Month average

Services
Preceding station	Delhi Metro	Following station
Inderlok towards Rithala	Red Line	Pratap Nagar towards Shaheed Sthal (New Bus Adda)
Route map
Location

Shastri Nagar is an elevated metro station on the Red Line of the Delhi Metro, located in North Delhi. It commenced operations in October 2003 as part of the extension of the Red Line from Tis Hazari to Trinagar (now Inderlok). The station was originally named Vivekanandapuri before being renamed Shastri Nagar following requests from local residents.

The station also provides access to the nearby Sarai Rohilla area and Delhi Sarai Rohilla railway station through a pedestrian bridge connected to Gate 1.

== Station layout ==
L2	Side platform | Doors will open on the left
L2	Platform 2 Eastbound	Towards → Shaheed Sthal (New Bus Adda); Next Station: Pratap Nagar
L2	Platform 1 Westbound	Towards ← Rithala; Next Station: Inderlok Change at the next station for Green Line
L2	Side platform | Doors will open on the left
L1	Concourse	Fare control, station agent, Metro Card vending machines, crossover
G	Street Level	Exit/Entrance

== Facilities ==
A Punjab National Bank (PNB) ATM is available at the unpaid concourse of the station.

== See also ==
- List of Delhi Metro stations
- Transport in Delhi
- Delhi Metro Rail Corporation
- Delhi Suburban Railway
- List of rapid transit systems in India
- Delhi Transport Corporation
- List of Metro Systems
