= Pulbangash metro station =

Metro station in Delhi, India

Pulbangash

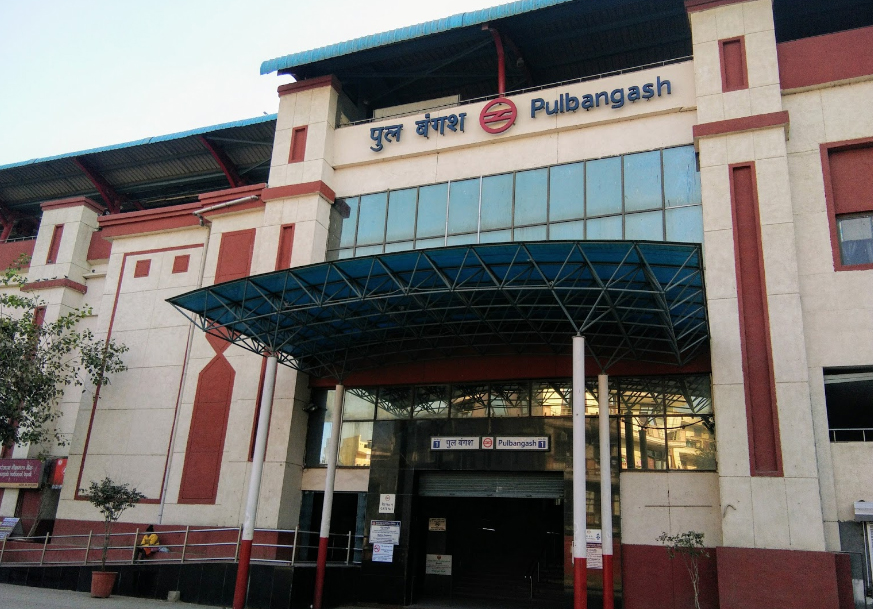
- Pul Bangash metro station

General information
- Location: Aram Ganj, Sabzi Mandi, Old Delhi, Pul Bangash, Delhi, 110006
- Coordinates: 28°39′59″N 77°12′25″E
- System: Delhi Metro station
- Owner: Delhi Metro Rail Corporation
- Line: Red Line Magenta Line (upcoming)
- Platforms: Side platform; Platform-1 → Rithala; Platform-2 → Shaheed Sthal (New Bus Adda)
- Tracks: 2

Construction
- Structure type: Elevated
- Platform levels: 2
- Accessible: Yes

Other information
- Station code: PBGH

History
- Opened: 3 October 2003; 22 years ago
- Electrified: 25 kV 50 Hz AC through overhead catenary

Passengers
- Jan 2015: 12,495 /day 387,359/ Month average

Services
Preceding station	Delhi Metro	Following station
Pratap Nagar towards Rithala	Red Line	Tis Hazari towards Shaheed Sthal (New Bus Adda)
Future service
Sadar Bazar towards Inderlok	Magenta Line	Ghanta Ghar towards Botanical Garden
Route map
Location

The Pulbangash metro station is located on the Red Line of the Delhi Metro.

== Station layout ==
L2	Side platform | Doors will open on the left
L2	Platform 2 Eastbound	Towards → Shaheed Sthal (New Bus Adda); Next Station: Tis Hazari
L2	Platform 1 Westbound	Towards ← Rithala; Next Station: Pratap Nagar
L2	Side platform | Doors will open on the left
L1	Concourse	Fare control, station agent, Metro Card vending machines, crossover
G	Street Level	Exit/Entrance

== Facilities ==
ATMs are available at Pulbangash metro station.

== See also ==
- List of Delhi Metro stations
- Transport in Delhi
- Delhi Metro Rail Corporation
- Delhi Suburban Railway
- List of rapid transit systems in India
