= Shastri Park metro station =

Metro station in Delhi, India

Shastri Park

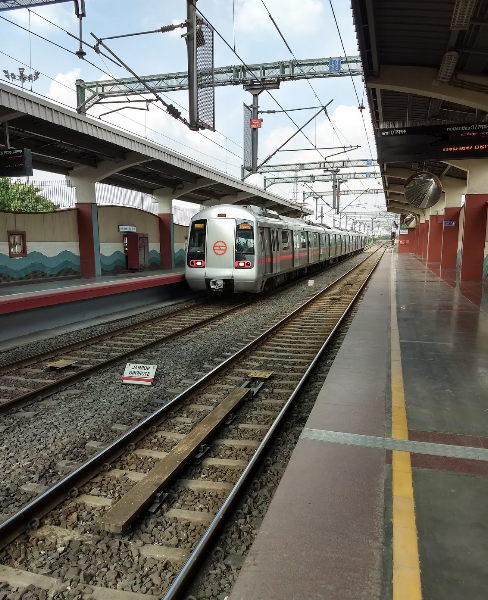
- Shastri Park metro station

General information
- Location: Metro Vihar, Shastri Park, Delhi, 110053
- Coordinates: 28°40′06″N 77°15′00″E
- System: Delhi Metro station
- Line: Red Line
- Platforms: Side platform Platform-1 → Rithala; Platform-2 → Shaheed Sthal (New Bus Adda)
- Tracks: 2

Construction
- Structure type: At Grade
- Parking: Available
- Accessible: Yes

Other information
- Station code: SHPK

History
- Opened: 25 December 2002
- Electrified: 25 kV 50 Hz AC through overhead catenary

Services
Preceding station	Delhi Metro	Following station
Kashmere Gate towards Rithala	Red Line	Seelampur towards Shaheed Sthal (New Bus Adda)
Route map
Location

Shastri Park is an at-grade metro station on the Red Line of the Delhi Metro, located in East Delhi. It commenced operations on 25 December 2002 as part of the Shahdara–Tis Hazari section, the first operational corridor of the Delhi Metro.

The station is situated adjacent to the Shastri Park Metro Depot, a facility used for the maintenance of metro trains. The Delhi Metro Rail Corporation also developed an Information Technology (IT) Park in the area, which was inaugurated in April 2005.

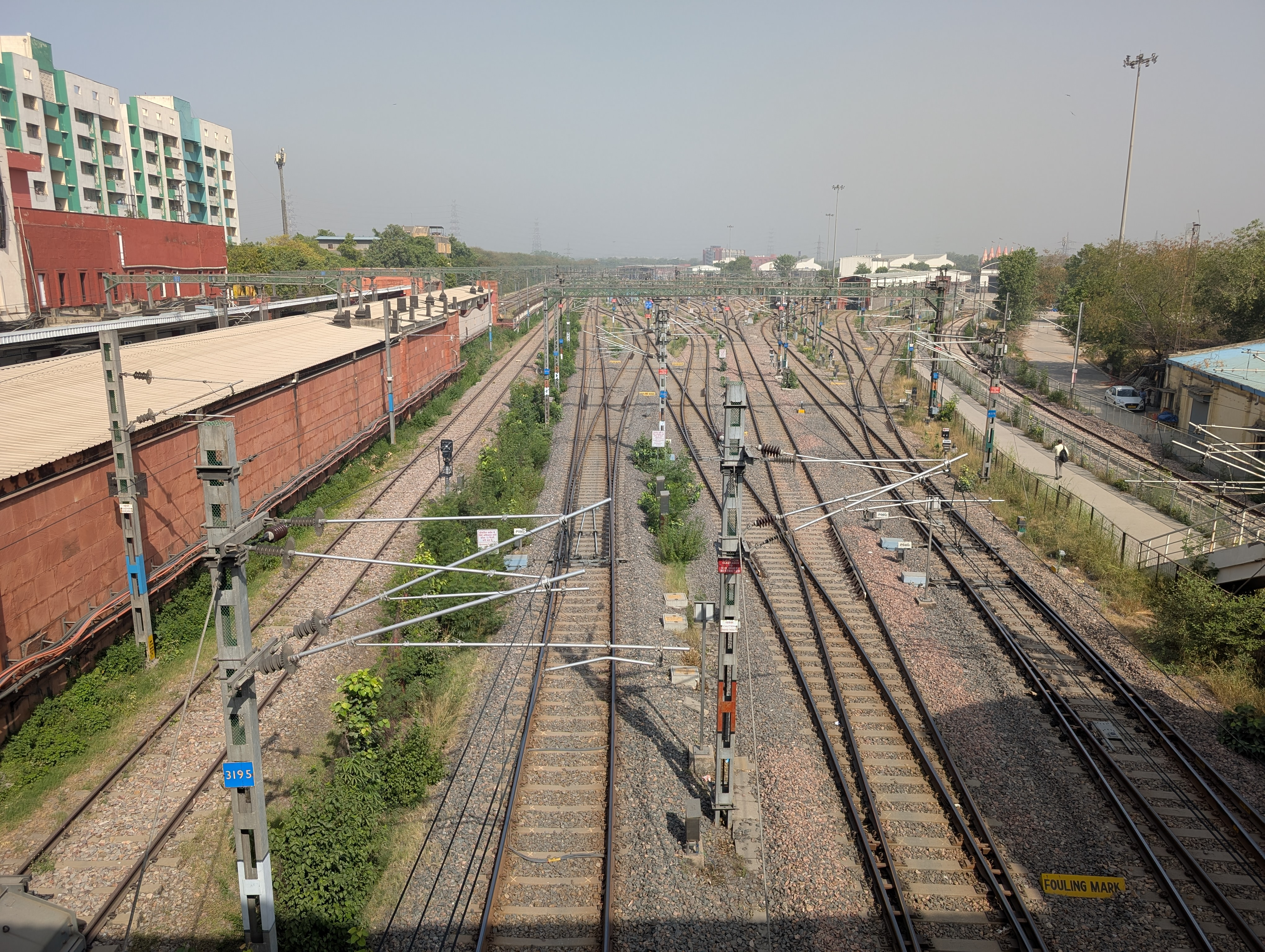
Shastri Park Depot

== Station layout ==
L2	Side platform | Doors will open on the left
L2	Platform 2 Eastbound	Towards → Shaheed Sthal (New Bus Adda); Next Station: Seelampur
L2	Platform 1 Westbound	Towards ← Rithala; Next Station: Kashmere Gate Change at the next station for Yellow Line or Violet Line
L2	Side platform | Doors will open on the left
L1	Concourse	Fare control, station agent, Metro Card vending machines, crossover
G	Street Level	Exit/Entrance

== See also ==
- List of Delhi Metro stations
