= Shastri (disambiguation) =

Lal Bahadur Shastri was the second prime minister of India, from 1964 to 1966.

Shastri may also refer to:

- Shastri (surname), an Indian surname
- Sastri, an Indian surname
- Shastri (2005 film), an Indian Kannada-language film
- Shastri (2024 film), a 2024 Indian Bengali-language science fiction fantasy action film by Pathikrit Basu
- Shastri (degree), a degree for Sanskrit-language education in India
- Shastri Nagar (disambiguation)
- Shastri Park, a neighborhood of North East Delhi, Delhi, India
  - Shastri Park metro station

== See also ==
- Shastri Sisters, an Indian television series
- Shastry Viruddh Shastry, a 2023 Indian film
