= Arthala metro station =

Metro station in Uttar Pradesh, India

Arthala

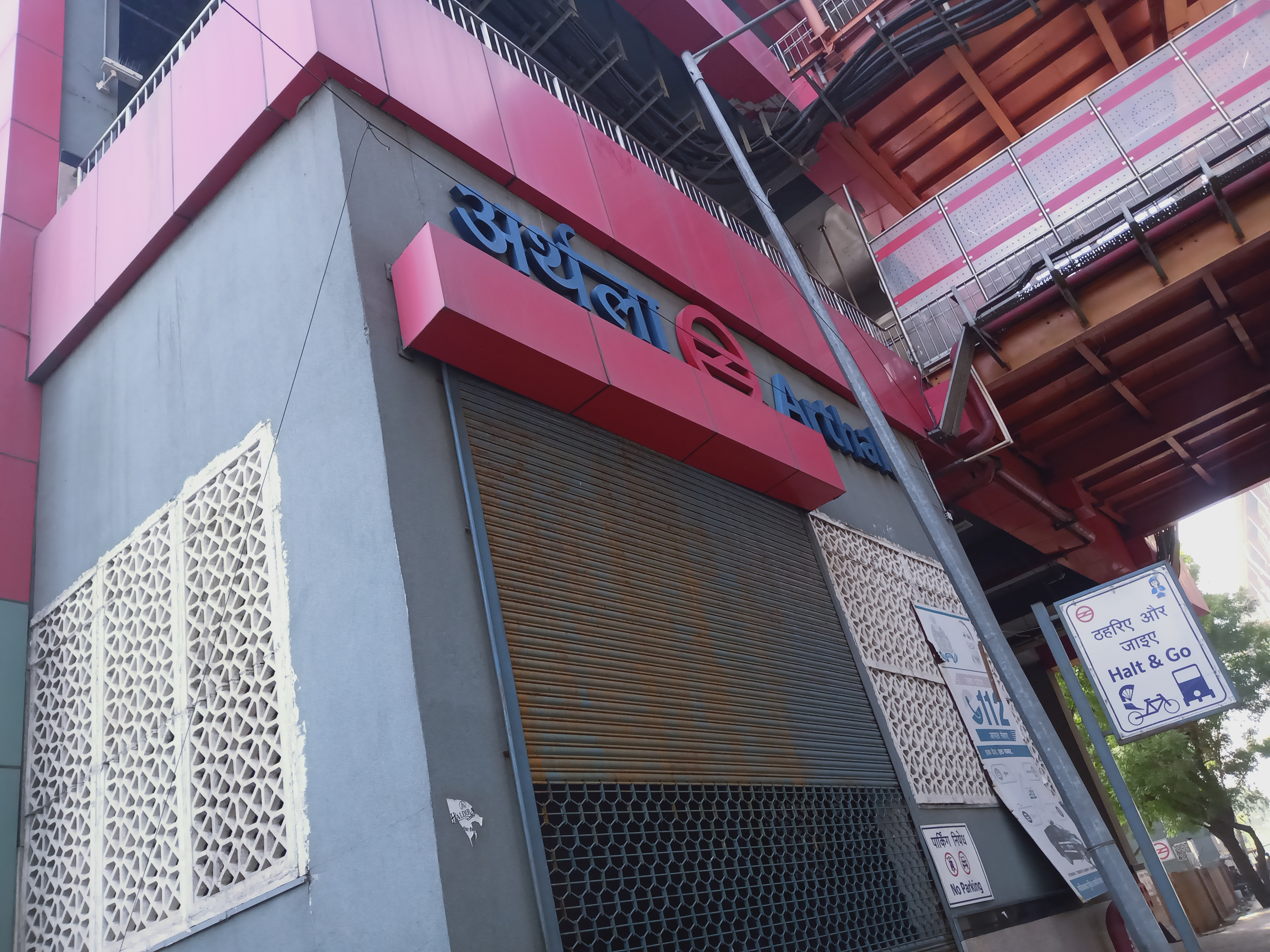

General information
- Location: GT Road, Arthala, Ghaziabad, Uttar Pradesh
- Coordinates: 28°40′37″N 77°23′30″E
- System: Delhi Metro station
- Owner: Delhi Metro Rail Corporation
- Line: Red Line
- Platforms: Side platform Platform-1 → Rithala; Platform-2 → Shaheed Sthal (New Bus Adda)
- Tracks: 2

Construction
- Structure type: Elevated
- Platform levels: 2
- Accessible: Yes

Other information
- Station code: ATHA

History
- Opened: 8 March 2019
- Electrified: 25 kV 50 Hz AC through overhead catenary

Services
Preceding station	Delhi Metro	Following station
Mohan Nagar towards Rithala	Red Line	Hindon River towards Shaheed Sthal (New Bus Adda)
Route map
Location

Arthala is an elevated metro station on the Red Line of the Delhi Metro, located in the Sahibabad Industrial Area of Ghaziabad, Uttar Pradesh. It commenced passenger operations on 9 March 2019 as part of the 9.4 kilometres (5.8 mi) Dilshad Garden–Shaheed Sthal (New Bus Adda) extension of the Red Line. The station is situated between Mohan Nagar and Hindon River stations.

== Station layout ==
L2	Side platform | Doors will open on the left
L2	Platform 2 Eastbound	Towards → Shaheed Sthal (New Bus Adda); Next Station: Hindon River
L2	Platform 1 Westbound	Towards ← Rithala; Next Station: Mohan Nagar
L2	Side platform | Doors will open on the left
L1	Concourse	Fare control, station agent, Metro Card vending machines, crossover
G	Street Level	Exit/Entrance

== See also ==
- List of Delhi Metro stations
- Transport in Delhi
- Delhi Metro Rail Corporation
- Delhi Suburban Railway
- List of rapid transit systems in India
- Delhi Transport Corporation
- List of Metro Systems
- National Capital Region (India)
- Ghaziabad district, Uttar Pradesh
