= Seelampur metro station =

Metro station in Delhi, India

Seelampur

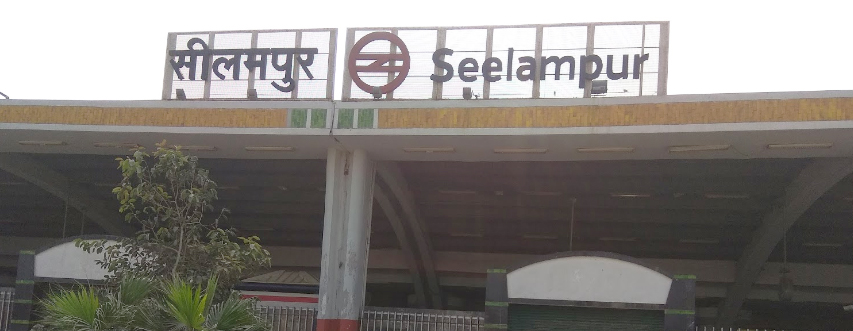
- Seelampur metro station

General information
- Location: Seelampur Gali, New Seelampur, Seelampur, New Delhi, Delhi 110053
- Coordinates: 28°40′11″N 77°16′00″E
- System: Delhi Metro station
- Line: Red Line
- Platforms: Island platform Platform-1 → Rithala; Platform-2 → Shaheed Sthal (New Bus Adda)
- Tracks: 2

Construction
- Structure type: At Grade
- Parking: Available
- Accessible: Yes

Other information
- Station code: SLAP

History
- Opened: 25 December 2002
- Electrified: 25 kV 50 Hz AC through overhead catenary

Services
Preceding station	Delhi Metro	Following station
Shastri Park towards Rithala	Red Line	Welcome towards Shaheed Sthal (New Bus Adda)
Route map
Location

The Seelampur metro station is located on the Red Line of the Delhi Metro.

== Station layout ==
P	Platform 2 Eastbound	Towards → Shaheed Sthal (New Bus Adda); Next Station: Welcome Change at the next station for Pink Line
P	Island platform | Doors will open on the right
P	Platform 1 Westbound	Towards ← Rithala; Next Station: Shastri Park
C	Concourse	Fare control, station agent, Ticket/token, shops
G	Street Level	Exit/ Entrance

== Facilities ==
This is a disabled friendly (divyang friendly) station if accessed from Gate 1 with DMRC Authorised Parking.

== See also ==
- List of Delhi Metro stations
