= Hindon =

Hindon may refer to:

- Hindon, Wiltshire, a village in England
  - Hindon (UK Parliament constituency), a former parliamentary borough
- Hindon, New Zealand, a small settlement on New Zealand's South Island
- The Hindon River, India
  - Hindon Air Force Station, an Indian Air Force base on the river, near Delhi
  - Hindon Airport, civilian enclave within the station
  - Hindon metro station, a station on the Delhi Metro, near the river

== See also ==
- Hindaun (disambiguation)
