= Kohat Enclave metro station =

Metro station in Delhi, India

Kohat Enclave

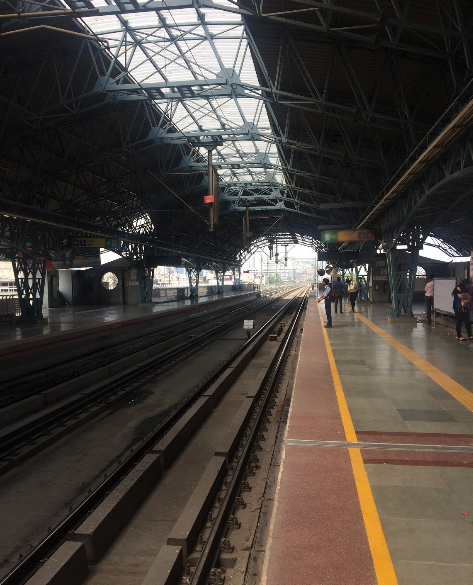
- Kohat Enclave metro station

General information
- Location: Kohat Enclave, near Pitampura, New Delhi, 110034
- Coordinates: 28°41′53″N 77°08′27″E
- System: Delhi Metro station
- Line: Red Line
- Platforms: Side platform Platform-1 → Rithala; Platform-2 → Shaheed Sthal (New Bus Adda)
- Tracks: 2

Construction
- Structure type: Elevated
- Platform levels: 2
- Parking: 2 Parking lots
- Accessible: Yes

Other information
- Station code: KE

History
- Opened: 31 March 2004
- Electrified: 25 kV 50 Hz AC through overhead catenary

Services
Preceding station	Delhi Metro	Following station
Madhuban Chowk towards Rithala	Red Line	Netaji Subhash Place towards Shaheed Sthal (New Bus Adda)
Route map
Location

Kohat Enclave is a metro station located on the Red Line of the Delhi Metro, The station caters to the localized areas in Pitampura, Delhi, namely Kapil Vihar, Kohat Enclave, Nishant Kunj, Sandesh Vihar, Vaishali Enclave, and Dakshini (South) Pitampura.

== Station layout ==
L2	Side platform | Doors will open on the left
L2	Platform 2 Eastbound	Towards → Shaheed Sthal (New Bus Adda); Next Station: Netaji Subhash Place; Change at the next station for Pink Line
L2	Platform 1 Westbound	Towards ← Rithala; Next Station: Madhuban Chowk; Interchange facilities at the next station for Magenta Line are not open for public use as of now
L2	Side platform | Doors will open on the left
L1	Concourse	Fare control, station agent, Metro Card vending machines, crossover
G	Street Level	Exit/Entrance

== See also ==
- List of Delhi Metro stations
- Transport in Delhi
