= Madhuban Chowk metro station =

Metro station in Delhi, India

Madhuban Chowk

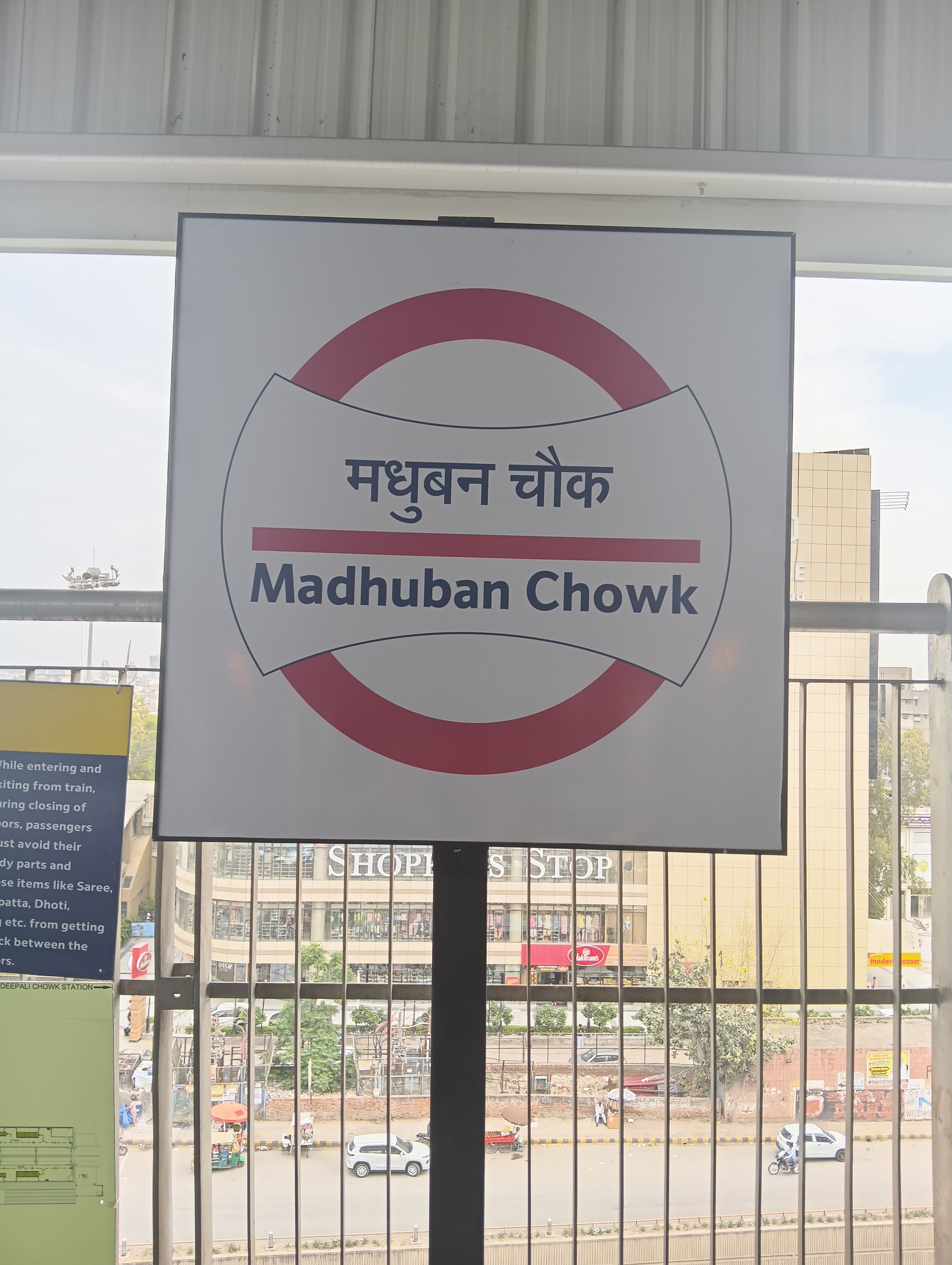
- Madhuban Chowk metro station

General information
- Location: Madhuban Chowk, Outer Ring Road, Block ED, Pitampura, Delhi 110034 / Sector 8 Rohini, Delhi, 110085
- Coordinates: 28°42′12″N 77°07′57″E
- System: Delhi Metro station
- Line: Red Line Magenta Line
- Platforms: Side platform; Platform 1 → Rithala; Platform 2 → Shaheed Sthal (New Bus Adda); Platform 3 → Deepali Chowk; Platform 4 → Majlis Park
- Tracks: 2

Construction
- Structure type: Elevated
- Platform levels: 2
- Parking: Available
- Accessible: Yes

Other information
- Station code: PTP

History
- Opened: 31 March 2004; 22 years ago Red Line; 8 March 2026; 8 months ago Magenta Line
- Electrified: 25 kV 50 Hz AC through overhead catenary

Services
Preceding station	Delhi Metro	Following station
Rohini towards Rithala	Red Line	Kohat Enclave towards Shaheed Sthal (New Bus Adda)
Uttari Pitampura-Prashant Vihar towards Majlis Park	Magenta Line	Deepali Chowk Terminus
Interchange facilities between the Red and Magenta Lines are not operational as of now
Route map
Location

Madhuban Chowk, formerly known as Pitampura, is an interchange station on the Red Line and Magenta Line of the Delhi Metro. The station serves the localities of Madhuban Chowk and Pitampura, as well as Sector 8 of Rohini. The Magenta Line station commenced operations on 8 March 2026, making the existing Red Line station an interchange. However, passengers currently have to exit one station and cross the road to reach the other, as the connecting foot overbridge is still under construction. The interchange walkway is expected to be completed by 30 November 2026, allowing passengers to transfer between the two lines without leaving the paid area.

== Station layout ==
Station layout Red Line

L2	Side platform | Doors will open on the left
L2	Platform 2 Eastbound	Towards → Shaheed Sthal (New Bus Adda); Next Station: Kohat Enclave
L2	Platform 1 Westbound	Towards ← Rithala; Next Station: Rohini
L2	Side platform | Doors will open on the left
L1	Concourse	Fare control, station agent, Metro Card vending machines, crossover
G	Street Level	Exit/Entrance

Station layout Magenta Line

L2	Side platform | Doors will open on the left
L2	Platform 3 Southbound	Towards → Deepali Chowk; Terminus
L2	Platform 4 Northbound	Towards ← Majlis Park; Next Station: Uttari Pitampura-Prashant Vihar
L2	Side platform | Doors will open on the left
L1	Concourse	Fare control, station agent, Metro Card vending machines, crossover
G	Street Level	Exit/Entrance

== See also ==
- List of Delhi Metro stations
- Transport in Delhi
