= SZM =

SZM or Szm can refer to:

- Czechoslovak Socialist Youth Union (Slovak: Socialistický zväz mládeže), youth wing of the Communist Party in the Czechoslovak Socialist Republic
- Sesriem airport (IATA code: SZM), in Sesriem, Namibia
- Shenzhen Metro, rapid transit system in Shenzhen, China
- Shizhong District, Neijiang, China (administrative division code: SZM),
- Silesian Museum (Opava) (Czech: Slezské zemské muzeum), oldest and third largest museum in the Czech Republic.
- Subzi Mandi railway station (station code: SZM), suburban railway station in National Capital Territory of Delhi, India
- Szmikite (mineral symbol: Szm), monohydrate of Manganese(II) sulfate
