= RHE =

RHE may refer to:

- Reversible hydrogen electrode
- Runs/hits/errors, part of the box score in baseball
- Rachel Held Evans
- RHE, the Delhi Metro station code for Rohini East metro station, Delhi, India
