= NBAA =

NBAA may refer to:

- National Billiard Association of America, today the Billiard Congress of America
- National Board of Accountants and Auditors, a government agency in Tanzania
- National Business Aviation Association, a trade association in the United States
- NBAA, the Delhi Metro station code for Shaheed Sthal metro station, Ghaziabad, Uttar Pradesh, India
