= Hindon River metro station =

Metro station in Uttar Pradesh, India

Hindon River

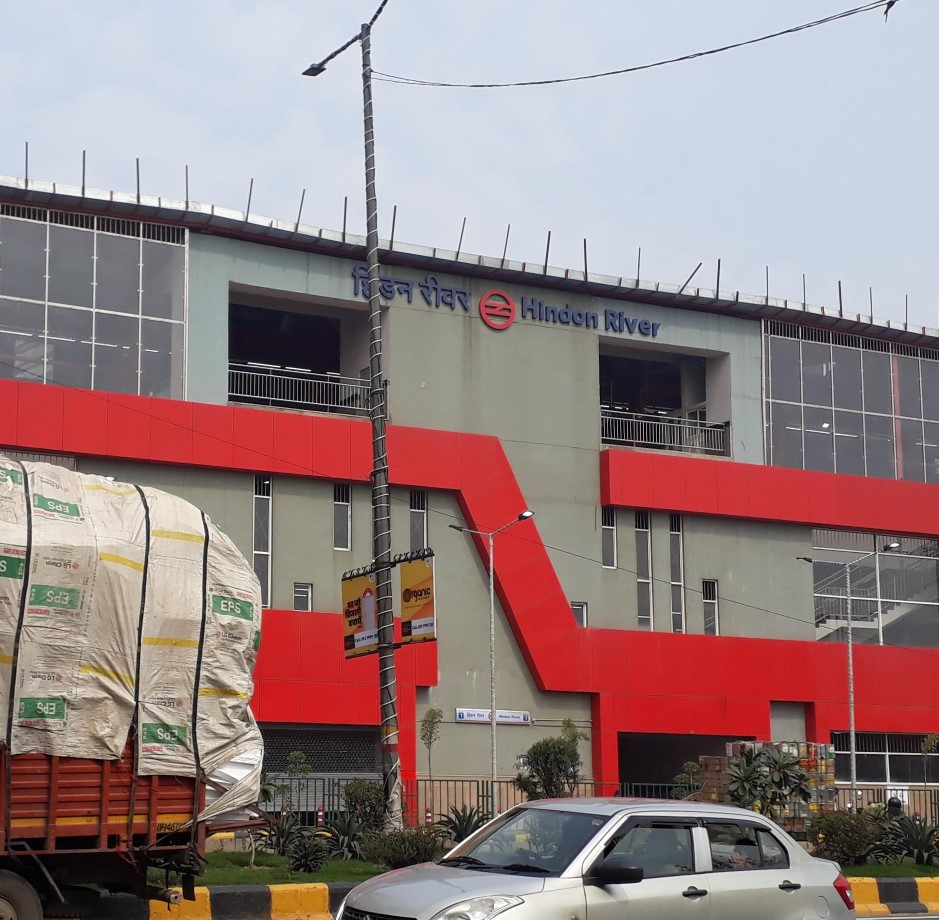

General information
- Location: Raj Nagar Extension GT Road, Hindon, Ghaziabad, Uttar Pradesh 201006
- Coordinates: 28°40′24″N 77°24′23″E
- System: Delhi Metro station
- Owner: Delhi Metro Rail Corporation
- Line: Red Line
- Platforms: Side platform Platform-1 → Rithala; Platform-2 → Shaheed Sthal (New Bus Adda)
- Tracks: 2

Construction
- Structure type: Elevated
- Platform levels: 2
- Accessible: Yes

Other information
- Station code: HDNR

History
- Opened: 8 March 2019
- Electrified: 25 kV 50 Hz AC through overhead catenary

Services
Preceding station	Delhi Metro	Following station
Arthala towards Rithala	Red Line	Shaheed Sthal towards Shaheed Sthal (New Bus Adda)
Route map
Location

Hindon River is an elevated metro station on the Red Line of the Delhi Metro, located in Ghaziabad, Uttar Pradesh. The station is named after the nearby Hindon River and provides access to the Raj Nagar Extension area. Nearby attractions include the City Forest, a recreational park situated along the banks of the Hindon River in the Karhera area.

== Station layout ==
L2	Side platform | Doors will open on the left
L2	Platform 2 Eastbound	Towards → Shaheed Sthal (New Bus Adda)
L2	Platform 1 Westbound	Towards ← Rithala; Next Station: Arthala
L2	Side platform | Doors will open on the left
L1	Concourse	Fare control, station agent, Metro Card vending machines, crossover
G	Street Level	Exit/Entrance

== See also ==
- List of Delhi Metro stations
- Transport in Delhi
- Delhi Metro Rail Corporation
- Delhi Suburban Railway
- List of rapid transit systems in India
- Delhi Transport Corporation
- List of Metro Systems
- National Capital Region (India)
- Ghaziabad district, Uttar Pradesh
