= Rohini metro station =

Metro station in Delhi, India

Rohini

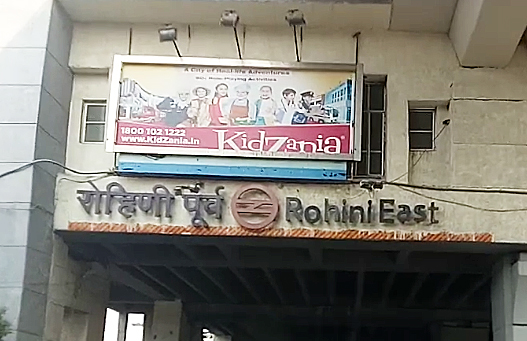
- Rohini Metro Station

General information
- Location: Bhagwan Mahavir Marg, Sector 14 & Sector 8, Rohini, Delhi, 110085, India.
- Coordinates: 28°42′28″N 77°07′33″E
- System: Delhi Metro station
- Line: Red Line
- Platforms: Side platform Platform-1 → Rithala; Platform-2 → Shaheed Sthal (New Bus Adda)
- Tracks: 2

Construction
- Structure type: Elevated
- Parking: 2 Parking lots
- Cycle facilities: Available
- Accessible: Yes

Other information
- Station code: RHE

History
- Opened: 31 March 2004
- Electrified: 25 kV 50 Hz AC through overhead catenary

Services
Preceding station	Delhi Metro	Following station
Dr. Baba Saheb Ambedkar Hospital towards Rithala	Red Line	Madhuban Chowk towards Shaheed Sthal (New Bus Adda)
Route map
Location

Rohini (formerly known as Rohini East) is a metro station of the Red Line of Delhi Metro. It is located in Sector 8 & Sector 14 of Rohini in Delhi, India. The station was inaugurated on 31 March 2004.

== Station layout ==
L2	Side platform | Doors will open on the left
L2	Platform 2 Eastbound	Towards → Shaheed Sthal (New Bus Adda); Next Station: Madhuban Chowk; Interchange facilities at the next station for Magenta Line are not open for public use as of now
L2	Platform 1 Westbound	Towards ← Rithala; Next Station: Dr. Baba Saheb Ambedkar Hospital
L2	Side platform | Doors will open on the left
L1	Concourse	Fare control, station agent, Metro Card vending machines, crossover
G	Street Level	Exit/Entrance

== See also ==
- List of Delhi Metro stations
- Transport in Delhi
