= RHW =

RHW or RhW may refer to:

- Rainbow Honor Walk, a walk of fame installation in San Francisco, California
- Rheineck–Walzenhausen mountain railway, a 1.9 kilometre long rack railway in Switzerland
- RHW, the Delhi Metro station code for Rohini West metro station, Delhi, India
