= Sadar Bazar railway station =

Railway station in Delhi, India

Sadar Bazar
- Railway tracks near Sadar Bazar railway station

General information
- Location: Qutab Road, Sadar Bazar, Central Delhi, Delhi – 110006
- Coordinates: 28.6586°N 77.2168°E
- Elevation: 221 m (725 ft)
- System: Indian Railway and Delhi Suburban Railway station
- Owner: Indian Railways
- Platforms: 4 BG
- Tracks: 4 BG
- Connections: Red Line Tis Hazari

Construction
- Structure type: Standard (At-grade station)

Other information
- Status: Active
- Station code: DSB
- Fare zone: Northern Railways
- Classification: NSG-4

Services
Preceding station	Indian Railways	Following station
Old Delhi towards Sahibabad Junction	Northern Railway zone	New Delhi towards Hazrat Nizamuddin
Location

Sadar Bazar railway station, with the three-letter station code DSB, is a railway station located in the Sadar Bazar area of Delhi's Central Delhi district. The station, which has four platforms and three radiating lines, is maintained by Northern Railways and has been ranked NSG-4 as per the categorization of Indian Railway stations by commercial importance.

== Services ==
=== Rail ===
The station has the following trains passing, originating, or terminating at it:

- Udyan Abha Toofan Express
- Sirsa Express
- Saharanpur–Delhi Passenger
- Rohtak–Hazrat Nizamuddin Passenger
- Panipat–New Delhi MEMU
- Panipat–Ghaziabad MEMU
- Old Delhi–Agra Cantt. Passenger
- New Delhi–Kurukshetra MEMU
- Merrut Cantt.–Rewari Jn. Passenger (via New Delhi)
- Kurukshetra–Hazrat Nizamuddin MEMU
- Bulandshahr–Tilak Bridge Passenger

=== Metro ===
The railway station is located about 1.5 kilometres (0.93 mi) away from the Tis Hazari metro station of Delhi Metro's Red Line, which was one of the termini of its first section opened on 25 December 2002.

=== Bus ===
The railway station is located about 750 meters away from DTC's Peeli Kothi bus stop, and is served by bus routes 17, 102, 106, 109, 114, 115, 116, 117, 119, 124, 125, 126, 127, 129, 136, 137, 138, 141, 142, 144, 146, 147, 148, 149, 161, 175, 183, 194, 197, 199, 219, 219EXT, 219STL, 231, 232, 233, 816, 816EXT, 922, 922A, 923, 923, 924, 925, 926, 929, 937A, 942, and 942E.

== See also ==
- Hazrat Nizamuddin railway station
- New Delhi railway station
- Delhi Junction Railway station
- Anand Vihar Terminal railway station
- Sarai Rohilla railway station
- Delhi Metro
