= Shahdara metro station =

Metro station in Delhi, India

Shahdara

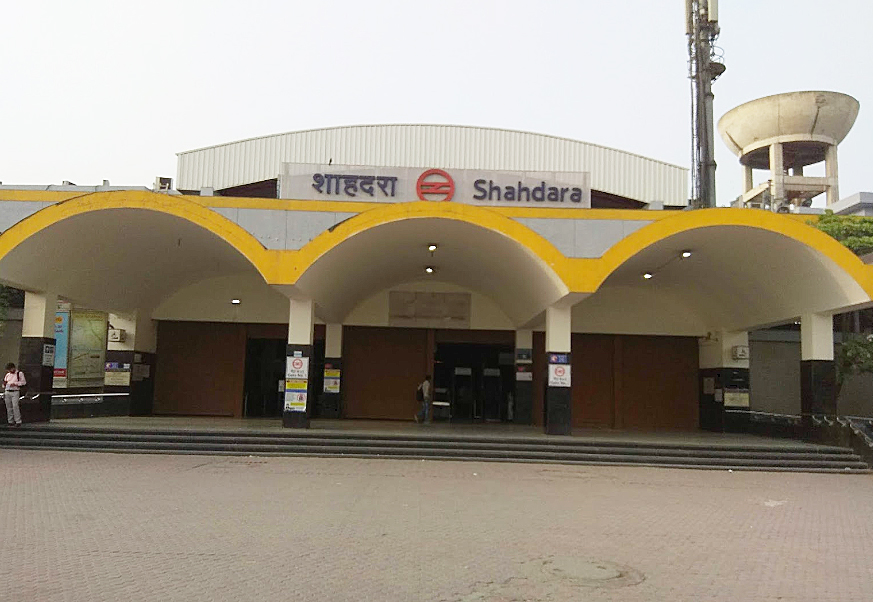
- Shahdara metro station

General information
- Location: Shahdara, New Delhi, 110032 (East Delhi)
- Coordinates: 28°40′25″N 77°17′24″E
- System: Delhi Metro station
- Owner: Delhi Metro Rail Corporation
- Line: Red Line
- Platforms: Side platform Platform-1 → Rithala; Platform-2 → Shaheed Sthal (New Bus Adda)
- Tracks: 2
- Connections: Delhi Shahdara

Construction
- Structure type: At Grade
- Parking: Available
- Accessible: Yes

Other information
- Station code: SHD

History
- Opened: 25 December 2002; 23 years ago
- Electrified: 25 kV 50 Hz AC through overhead catenary

Passengers
- June 2022: 30,000 per day

Services
Preceding station	Delhi Metro	Following station
Welcome towards Rithala	Red Line	Mansarovar Park towards Shaheed Sthal (New Bus Adda)
Route map
Location

Shahdara is a metro station on the Red Line of the Delhi Metro, located in Shahdara, East Delhi. It is one of the original stations of the network and commenced commercial operations on 25 December 2002, as part of the first operational section between Shahdara and Tis Hazari.

The station is situated near Shahdara railway junction of the Indian Railways network, providing connectivity between the Delhi Metro and the regional and long-distance railway services. It also serves the surrounding residential and commercial areas of Shahdara.

== History ==
Shahdara metro station was among the first six stations to become operational on the Delhi Metro network. Commercial services commenced on 25 December 2002, a day after the then Prime Minister Atal Bihari Vajpayee inaugurated the first 8.2 kilometres (5.1 mi) section of the Red Line between Shahdara and Tis Hazari.

== Station layout ==
L2	Side platform | Doors will open on the left
L2	Platform 2 Eastbound	Towards → Shaheed Sthal (New Bus Adda); Next Station: Mansarovar Park
L2	Platform 1 Westbound	Towards ← Rithala; Next Station: Welcome Change at the next station for Pink Line
L2	Side platform | Doors will open on the left
L1	Concourse	Fare control, station agent, Metro Card vending machines, crossover
G	Street Level	Exit/Entrance

== Facilities ==
Facilities available at the station include a YES Bank ATM, a Sulabh toilet and DMRC-authorised parking.

== See also ==
- List of Delhi Metro stations
- Transport in Delhi
- Delhi Metro Rail Corporation
- Delhi Suburban Railway
- List of rapid transit systems in India
