= Red Line (Delhi Metro) =

Line on the Delhi Metro system

Red Line (Line 1)
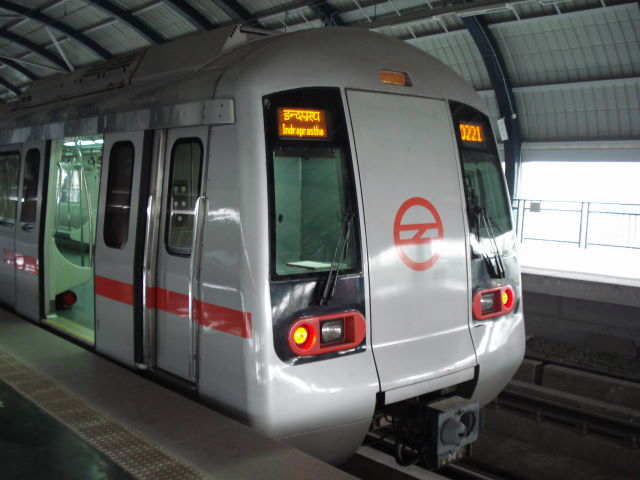
- Red Line

Overview
- Status: Operational
- Owner: DMRC
- Locale: Delhi, Ghaziabad and Sonipat
- Termini: Shaheed Sthal; Rithala
- Stations: 29

Service
- Type: Rapid Transit
- System: Delhi Metro
- Operator: Delhi Metro Rail Corporation
- Daily ridership: 374,516

History
- Opened: 25 December 2002; 23 years ago
- Last extension: 8 March 2019

Technical
- Line length: 34.55 km (21.47 mi)
- Character: At-grade and Elevated
- Track gauge: 1,676 mm (5 ft 6 in) broad gauge
- Electrification: 25 kV 50 Hz AC from overhead catenary
Route map
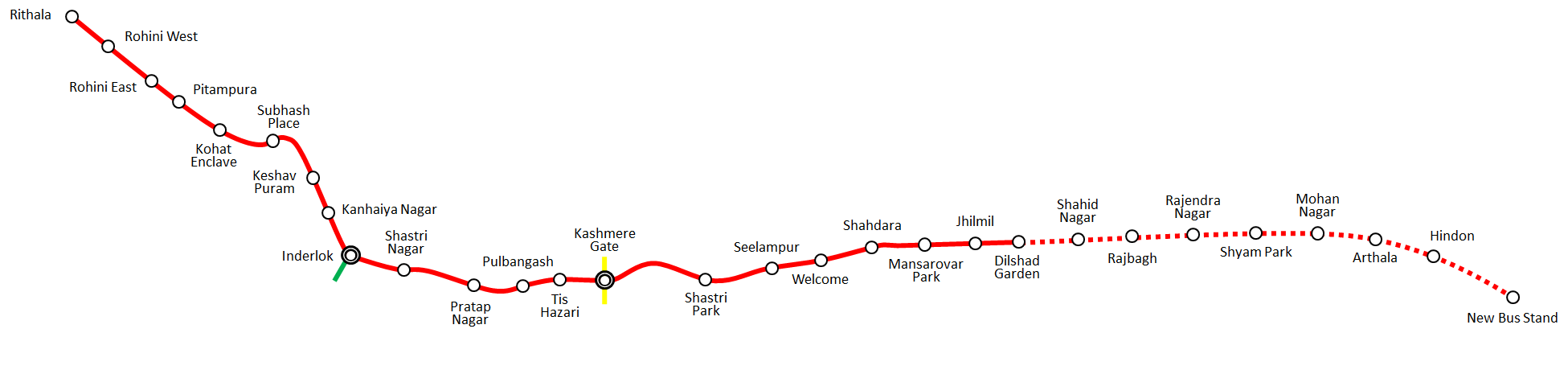

The Red Line (Line 1) is a rapid transit metro line of the Delhi Metro in Delhi, India. It is mostly an elevated line and has 29 stations that runs from Rithala to Shaheed Sthal with a total distance of 34.55 km (21.47 mi). The Tis Hazari – Shahdara section of this line was the first stretch of the Delhi Metro that was constructed and commissioned. The line connects the areas of Ghaziabad in Uttar Pradesh and the districts of Shahdara, Central Delhi and North West Delhi in Delhi.

The Red Line has interchanges with the Yellow Line and Violet line at Kashmere Gate, the Pink Line at Welcome and Netaji Subhash Place, and the Green Line at Inderlok. It is the third most heavily used line of the Delhi Metro network as it acts as a link for those in West Delhi and North West Delhi traveling towards Central Delhi, Shahdara, East Delhi, and Ghaziabad, and vice versa.

== History ==
Red Line
Phase	Extension date	Termini		Length	Stations
I	25 December 2002	Shahdara	Tis Hazari	8.35 kilometers (5.19 mi)	6
I	3 October 2003	Tis Hazari	Inderlok	4.87 kilometers (3.03 mi)	4
I	31 March 2004	Inderlok	Rithala	8.84 kilometers (5.49 mi)	8
II	4 June 2008	Shahdara	Dilshad Garden	2.86 kilometers (1.78 mi)	3
III	8 March 2019	Dilshad Garden	Shaheed Sthal	9.63 kilometers (5.98 mi)	8
Total		Shaheed Sthal	Rithala	34.55 kilometers (21.47 mi)	29

=== Phase I & II ===
The Red Line was the first line of the Delhi Metro to be constructed and opened. The Tis Hazari – Shahdara section of the line was inaugurated by the then Prime Minister of India, Shri. Atal Bihari Vajpayee, on 25 December 2002 and opened to the public on the same day. Subsequent sections opened between Tis Hazari – Inderlok on 3 October 2003, Inderlok – Rithala on 31 March 2004 and Shahdara – Dilshad Garden on 4 June 2008.

=== Phase III ===
As part of the Phase III of Delhi Metro, an eastward extension of 9.5 kilometres (5.90 mi) from Dilshad Garden to Ghaziabad ISBT (New Bus Adda) was approved by DMRC and MoHUA in January 2014. Construction began in early 2015 and commercial operations started on 8 March 2019, thereby providing commuters another link to travel to Ghaziabad along with the Blue Line branch that connects to Kaushambi and Vaishali. In November 2022, Delhi Metro introduced a set of two eight-coach trains on the Red Line, which were converted from the existing fleet of 39 six-coach trains. By April 2024, all the six-coach trains had been converted to 8-coach ones.

=== Phase IV ===
Under Phase IV of Delhi Metro, the Red Line will be extended to Kundli, with 21 new stations at Rohini Sector 25, Rohini Sector 26, Rohini Sector 31, Rohini Sector 32, Rohini Sector 36, Barwala, Rohini Sector 35, Rohini Sector 34, Bawana Industrial Area - 1 Sector 3,4, Bawana Industrial Area - 1 Sector 1,2, Bawana JJ Colony, Sanoth, New Sanoth, Depot Station, Bhorgarh Village, Anaj Mandi Narela, Narela DDA Sports Complex, Narela, Narela Sector 5, Kundli and Nathpur. All these stations will be elevated, except Depot Station, which would be at-grade. The cost of this project is expected to be ₹6,230 crore (US$650 million), and approval for it was provided by the Union Cabinet in December 2024.

=== Phase V ===
In Phase-V, the Red Line is proposed to be extended from Shaheed Sthal (New Bus Adda) to Ghaziabad Junction. This would be 3 km (1.9 mi) long elevated corridor with 1 new station.

== List of stations ==
Delhi Metro currently has parking facilities at 20 metro stations of the Red line.

Red Line
#	Station Name		Phase	Opening	Interchange connection	Station Layout	Platform Level Type
#	English	Hindi	Phase	Opening	Interchange connection	Station Layout	Platform Level Type
1	Shaheed Sthal (New Bus Adda)	शहीद स्थल (न्यू बस अड्डा)	III	8 March 2019	Ghaziabad	Elevated	Side
2	Hindon River	हिंडन रिवर	III	8 March 2019	None	Elevated	Side
3	Arthala	अर्थला	III	8 March 2019	None	Elevated	Side
4	Mohan Nagar	मोहन नगर	III	8 March 2019	Blue Line (Phase V(B) - Proposed)	Elevated	Side
5	Shyam Park	श्याम पार्क	III	8 March 2019	None	Elevated	Side
6	Major Mohit Sharma Rajendra Nagar	मे‌‌जर मोहित शर्मा राजेन्द्र नगर	III	8 March 2019	None	Elevated	Side
7	Raj Bagh	राज बाग़	III	8 March 2019	None	Elevated	Side
8	Shaheed Nagar	शहीद नगर	III	8 March 2019	None	Elevated	Side
9	Dilshad Garden	दिलशाद गार्डन	II	4 June 2008	None	Elevated	Side
10	Jhilmil	झिलमिल	II	4 June 2008	None	Elevated	Side
11	Mansarovar Park	मानसरोवर पार्क	II	4 June 2008	None	Elevated	Side
12	Shahdara	शाहदरा	I	25 December 2002	Delhi Shahdara	At Grade	Side
13	Welcome	वेलकम	I	25 December 2002	Pink Line	At Grade	Island
14	Seelampur	सीलमपुर	I	25 December 2002	None	At Grade	Island
15	Shastri Park	शास्त्री पार्क	I	25 December 2002	None	At Grade	Side
16	Kashmere Gate	कश्मीरी गेट	I	25 December 2002	Yellow Line; Violet Line; Kashmere Gate ISBT	Elevated	Side
17	Tis Hazari	तीस हज़ारी	I	25 December 2002	None	Elevated	Side
18	Pulbangash	पुलबंगश	I	3 October 2003	Magenta Line (Phase IV – Under Construction)	Elevated	Side
19	Pratap Nagar	प्रताप नगर	I	3 October 2003	Subzi Mandi; Delhi Kishanganj	Elevated	Side
20	Shastri Nagar	शास्त्री नगर	I	3 October 2003	None	Elevated	Side
21	Inderlok	इंद्रलोक	I	3 October 2003	Green Line; Magenta Line (Phase IV - Under Construction)	Elevated	Side
22	Kanhaiya Nagar	कन्हैया नगर	I	31 March 2004	None	Elevated	Side
23	Keshav Puram	केशव पुरम	I	31 March 2004	Phase V(B) Red Line Rohini Sector 34	Elevated	Side
24	Netaji Subhash Place	नेताजी सुभाष प्लेस	I	31 March 2004	Pink Line	Elevated	Side
25	Kohat Enclave	कोहाट एन्क्लेव	I	31 March 2004	None	Elevated	Side
26	Madhuban Chowk	मधुबन चौक	I	31 March 2004	Magenta Line (Interchange not operational)	Elevated	Side
27	Rohini	रोहिणी	I	31 March 2004	None	Elevated	Side
28	Dr. Baba Saheb Ambedkar Hospital	डॉ. बाबा साहेब अम्बेडकर अस्पताल	I	31 March 2004	None	Elevated	Side
29	Rithala	रिठाला	I	31 March 2004	None	Elevated	Side
30	Rohini Sector 25	रोहिणी सेक्टर 25	IV	Approved	None	Elevated	Side
31	Rohini Sector 26	रोहिणी सेक्टर 26	IV	Approved	None	Elevated	Side
32	Rohini Sector 31	रोहिणी सेक्टर 31	IV	Approved	None	Elevated	Side
33	Rohini Sector 28	रोहिणी सेक्टर 28	IV	Approved	None	Elevated	Side
34	Rohini Sector 29,30	रोहिणी सेक्टर 29,30	IV	Approved	None	Elevated	Side
35	Rohini Sector 35	रोहिणी सेक्टर 35	IV	Approved	None	Elevated	Side
36	Barwala	बरवाला	IV	Approved	None	Elevated	Side
37	Rohini Sector 34	रोहिणी सेक्टर 34	IV	Approved	Red Line from Keshav Puram	Elevated	Side
38	Bawana Industrial Area-1 Sector 3,4	बवाना इंडस्ट्रियल एरिया-1 सेक्टर 3,4	IV	Approved	None	Elevated	Side
39	Bawana Industrial Area-1 Sector 1,2	बवाना इंडस्ट्रियल एरिया-1 सेक्टर 1,2	IV	Approved	None	Elevated	Side
40	Narela Sector G-8	नरेला सेक्टर G-8	IV	Approved	None	Elevated	Side
41	Narela Sector G-7	नरेला सेक्टर G-7	IV	Approved	None	Elevated	Side
42	Narela Sector G-6	नरेला सेक्टर G-6	IV	Approved	None	Elevated	Side
43	Narela Depot	नरेला डिपो	IV	Approved	None	At Grade	Side
44	Narela Anaj Mandi	नरेला अनाज मंडी	IV	Approved	None	Elevated	Side
45	Narela Sector A-7	नरेला सेक्टर A-7	IV	Approved	Yellow Line from Samaypur Badli	Elevated	Side
46	Narela Sector A-1	नरेला सेक्टर A-1	IV	Approved	None	Elevated	Side
47	Narela Sector A-4	नरेला सेक्टर A-4	IV	Approved	None	Elevated	Side
48	Narela Sector A-5	नरेला सेक्टर A-5	IV	Approved	None	Elevated	Side
49	Kundli	कुंडली	IV	Approved	None	Elevated	Side
50	Nathupur	नाथूपुर	IV	Approved	None	Elevated	Side

== Train info ==
Red Line
Rakes	Mitsubishi	Hyundai Rotem	BEML
Train Length	8		
Train Gauge	1,676 mm (5 ft 6 in) broad gauge		
Electrification	25 kV 50 Hz AC (nominal) from overhead catenary		
Train's Maximum Speed	100 km/h (62 mph)		
Train Operation	Rithala - Dilshad Garden Rithala - Shaheed Sthal (NBA)		

== See also ==
- List of Delhi Metro stations
- Transport in Delhi
- Delhi Metro Rail Corporation
- Delhi Suburban Railway
- List of rapid transit systems in India
- Delhi Transport Corporation
- List of Metro Systems
- National Capital Region (India)
- Ghaziabad district, Uttar Pradesh
