= Shastri Nagar =

Shastri Nagar may refer to these places in India named after the 2nd prime minister of India Lal Bahadur Shastri:

- Shastri Nagar, Ahmedabad, a neighborhood of Ahmedabad, India
- Shastri Nagar, Chennai, a suburb of Chennai, India
- Shastri Nagar, Delhi, a locality in Delhi, India
  - Shastri Nagar metro station, a metro station in Delhi, India
- Shastri Nagar, Great Nicobar, a village in Andaman and Nicobar Islands, India
- Shastri Nagar (Mumbai) metro station, a metro station in Mumbai, India
- Lal Bahadur Shastri Nagara (Anjanapura Township), a neighborhood of Bengaluru
