= Tis Hazari metro station =

Metro station in Delhi, India

Tis Hazari

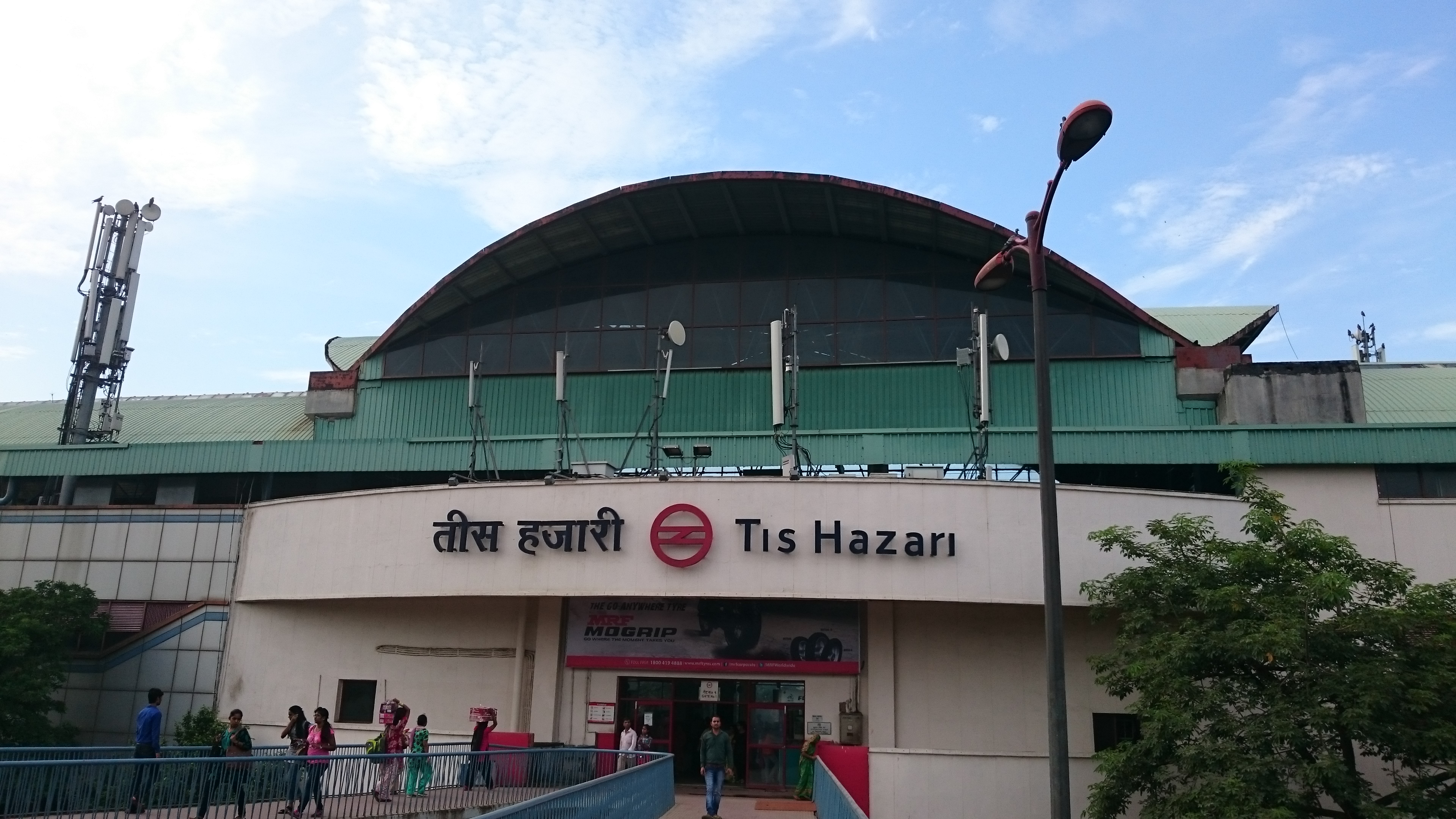

General information
- Location: Tis Hazari, Central Delhi, Delhi - 110054
- Coordinates: 28°40′02″N 77°12′59″E
- System: Delhi Metro station
- Owner: Delhi Metro
- Line: Red Line
- Platforms: Side platform Platform-1 → Rithala; Platform-2 → Shaheed Sthal (New Bus Adda)
- Tracks: 2

Construction
- Structure type: Elevated
- Parking: Available
- Accessible: Yes

Other information
- Station code: TZI

History
- Opened: 25 December 2002
- Electrified: 25 kV 50 Hz AC through overhead catenary

Services
Preceding station	Delhi Metro	Following station
Pul Bangash towards Rithala	Red Line	Kashmere Gate towards Shaheed Sthal (New Bus Adda)
Route map
Location

Tis Hazari is an elevated metro station on the Red Line of the Delhi Metro, located in the Tis Hazari area of Central Delhi. It commenced commercial operations on 25 December 2002 as part of the Shahdara–Tis Hazari section, the first operational corridor of the Delhi Metro.

The station is situated opposite the Tis Hazari Courts Complex, the principal district court of Delhi. A footbridge connects the station to Gate No. 2 of the court complex. The footbridge includes a ramp to facilitate access for people with disabilities.

== History ==
Tis Hazari was one of the first six stations on the Delhi Metro network. Commercial operations commenced on 25 December 2002, a day after the then Prime Minister Atal Bihari Vajpayee inaugurated the first 8.2 kilometres (5.1 mi) section of the Red Line between Shahdara and Tis Hazari.

== Station layout ==
Red Line Station layout

L2	Side platform | Doors will open on the left
L2	Platform 2 Eastbound	Towards → Shaheed Sthal (New Bus Adda); Next Station: Kashmere Gate Change at the next station for Yellow Line or Violet Line
L2	Platform 1 Westbound	Towards ← Rithala; Next Station: Pul Bangash
L2	Side platform | Doors will open on the left
L1	Concourse	Fare control, station agent, Metro Card vending machines, crossover
G	Street Level	Exit/Entrance

== Facilities ==
Toilets: The station has a Sulabh toilet located near gate no. 3. There are also HDFC bank and SBI ATMs.

== Exits ==
Tis Hazari station entry/exits
Gate No-1	Gate No-2	Gate No-3
Towards St. Stephen Hospital, Tis Hazari Court, Sadar Bazaar and Dept. of Animal Husbandry	Towards Lala Hardev Sahai Marg, St. Stephen Hospital, Tis Hazari Court and Sadar bazar	Towards Parking, Lt. Governor's Secretariat, Aruna Asaf Ali Hospital, Rajpur Road and Boulevard Road

== Connections ==
=== Bus ===
DTC bus routes number 17, 88, 102, 106, 107, 109, 114, 115, 116, 117, 119, 123, 124, 125, 125EXT, 126, 127, 128, 129, 131, 128, 129, 131, 133, 134, 136, 137, 138, 141, 142, 144, 146, 147, 148, 149, 154, 161, 172, 175, 182A, 182ACL, 183, 184, 194, 197, 199, 208, 218, 219EXT, 219STL, 231, 0236, 236, 236EXT, 247, 721, 792, 805A, 816, 816A, 817N, 823, 841, 842, 847, 863, 863SPL, 905, 905A, 906, 907, 922, 922A, 923, 924, 925, 0926, 926, 929, 937A, 939, 942, 942E and 992 serve the station from nearby Tis Hazari Court bus stop.

=== Rail ===
Sadar Bazar railway station, served by the Northern Railway, is located approximately 1.7 km (1.1 mi) from Tis Hazari metro station.

== Incidents ==
- 28 May 2012: Two men were shot outside Tis Hazari Metro station during a robbery. One of the victims, Rajender Jain, died from his injuries, while the other was seriously injured. The assailants fled with ₹25,000 (equivalent to ₹51,000 or US$550 in 2026).
- 3 June 2012: Delhi Police arrested seven men suspected of involvement in the robbery and murder, along with several other criminal cases. Five pistols and 14 live cartridges were recovered from them.

== Gallery ==
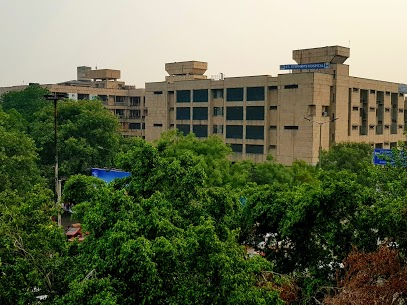
St Stephen's Hospital

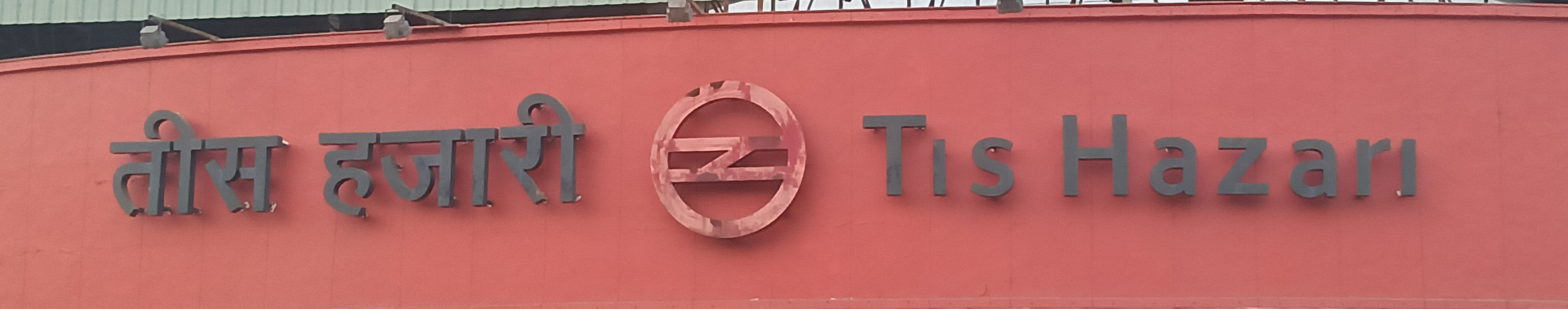
Tis Hazari metro station

== See also ==
- List of Delhi Metro stations
- Transport in Delhi
