= Subzi Mandi railway station =

Railway station in Delhi, India

Subzi Mandi

General information
- Location: Ram Bagh Road, Gulabi Bagh, Delhi; India
- Coordinates: 28.6690°N 77.1997°E
- Elevation: 220 metres (720 ft)
- System: Indian Railway and Delhi Suburban Railway station
- Platforms: 2
- Connections: Red Line Pratap Nagar

Construction
- Structure type: Standard (on-ground station)
- Parking: yes

Other information
- Status: Functioning
- Station code: SZM
- Zone(s): Northern Railway
- Division(s): Delhi

History
- Former names: East Indian Railway Company

Services
Preceding station	Indian Railways	Following station
Sadar Bazar towards ?	Northern Railway zone Delhi–Kalka line	Delhi Azadpur towards ?
Location
- Location within India Location within Delhi

Subzi Mandi railway station (station code: SZM) is a railway station located in the Gulabi Bagh area of Delhi's Central Delhi district. It is maintained by Northern Railways and has been ranked NSG-5 as per the categorization of Indian Railway stations by commercial importance.

== History ==
In 1880, the Subzi Mandi station was constructed on the East Indian Railway's Delhi-Amritsar-Lahore line.

In 2025-26, Sabzi Mandi station underwent ₹27 crore redevelopment including new station building, new platforms, renovated waiting hall and toilets, new escalators and lifts, additional cafeteria, and "One Station, One Product" stalls.

== Connections ==
=== Metro ===
The railway station is located at a walking distance from Delhi Metro's Pratap Nagar metro station.

== See also ==
- Transport in Delhi
