= Dr. Baba Saheb Ambedkar Hospital metro station =

Metro station in Delhi, India

Dr. Baba Saheb Ambedkar Hospital

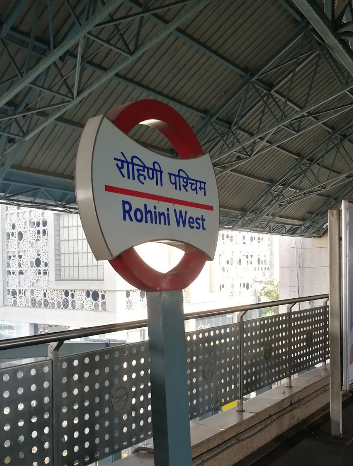
- Dr. Baba Saheb Ambedkar Hospital Metro Station

General information
- Location: Bhagwan Mahavir Marg, Sector 10 & Sector 6, Rohini, Delhi, 110085, India.
- Coordinates: 28°42′54″N 77°06′55″E
- System: Delhi Metro station
- Line: Red Line
- Platforms: Side platform Platform-1 → Rithala; Platform-2 → Shaheed Sthal (New Bus Adda)
- Tracks: 2

Construction
- Structure type: Elevated
- Accessible: Yes

Other information
- Station code: RHW

History
- Opened: 31 March 2004
- Electrified: 25 kV 50 Hz AC through overhead catenary

Services
Preceding station	Delhi Metro	Following station
Rithala Terminus	Red Line	Rohini towards Shaheed Sthal (New Bus Adda)
Route map
Location

Dr. Baba Saheb Ambedkar Hospital (formerly known as Rohini West) is a metro station of the Red Line of Delhi Metro. It is located in Sector 6 & Sector 10 of Rohini in Delhi, India. The station was inaugurated on 31 March 2004. The station is located just in front of Unity One Mall, Rohini. To provide seamless connection, the mall and the station have been integrated with Skywalk between the station building and the mall near gate no. 1 which allows travellers to directly enter the mall without exiting through the exit gates and vice versa.

== Station layout ==
L2	Side platform | Doors will open on the left
L2	Platform 2 Eastbound	Towards → Shaheed Sthal (New Bus Adda); Next Station: Rohini
L2	Platform 1 Westbound	Towards ← Rithala
L2	Side platform | Doors will open on the left
L1	Concourse	Fare control, station agent, Metro Card vending machines, crossover
G	Street Level	Exit/Entrance

== See also ==
- List of Delhi Metro stations
- Transport in Delhi
