= Hindaun (disambiguation) =

Hindaun is a city in the Karauli district of the Indian state of Rajasthan.

It may also refer to:

- Hindaun City bus depot, a bus depot in Hindaun
- Hindaun City railway station, a railway station in Hindaun
- Hindaun (Rajasthan Assembly constituency), one of the constituencies of the Rajasthan Legislative Assembly
- Hindaun Block, a block in Karauli district, Rajasthan, India

== See also ==
- Hindon (disambiguation)
