= Sadar Bazaar, Delhi =

Sadar Bazaar (Delhi)
- Residential-commercial neighborhood and market
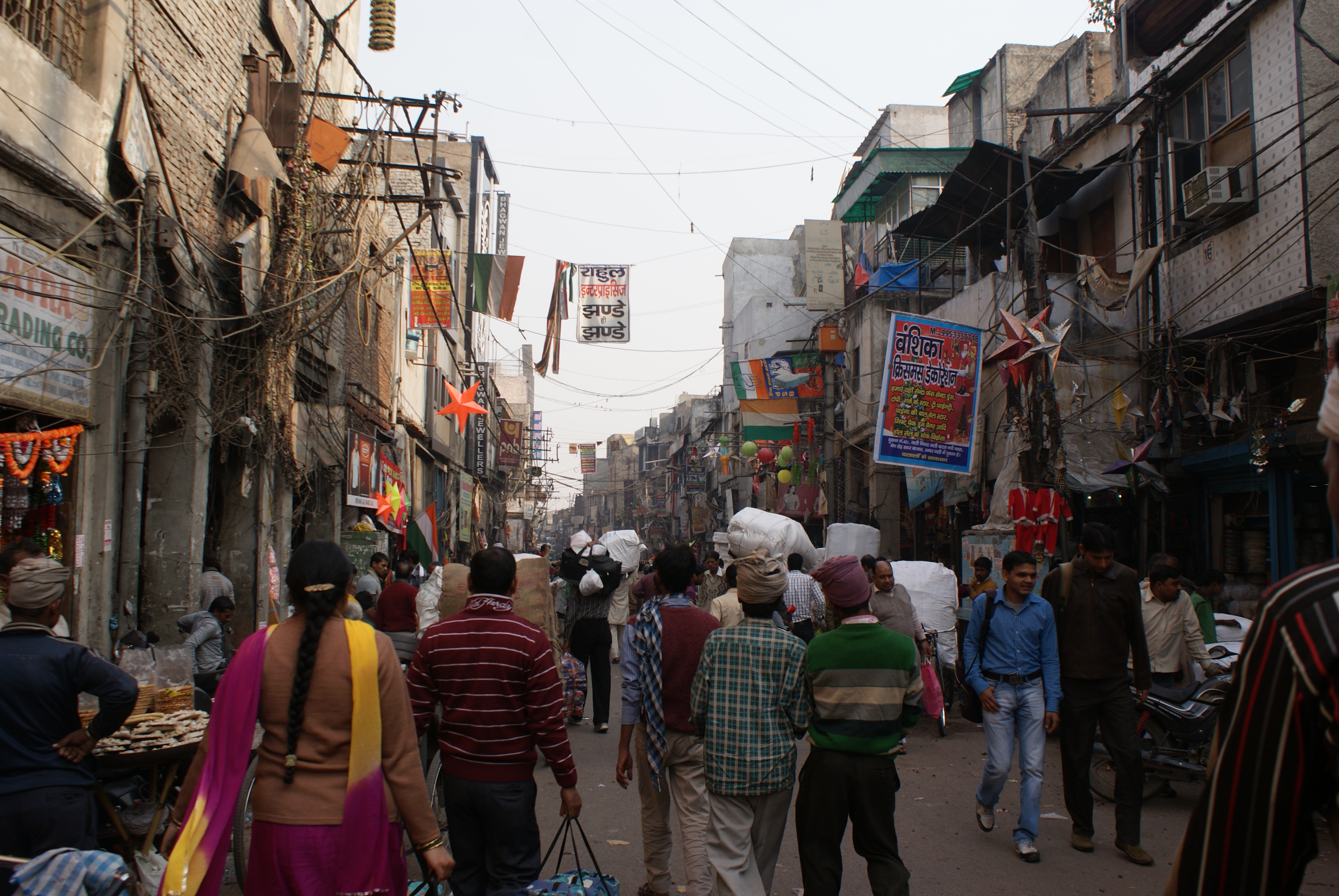
- The Bara Tooti chowk in Sadar Bazaar, Delhi

- Location in Delhi, India
- Coordinates: 28°39′30.701″N 77°12′45.823″E
- Country: India
- State: Delhi

Languages
  - Official: Hindi, English
- Time zone: UTC+5:30 (IST)
- PIN: 110006
- Lok Sabha constituency: Chandni Chowk
- Vidhan Sabha constituency: Sadar Bazar
- Civic agency: MCD

Sadar Bazaar is a wholesale market located mostly in Central Delhi, just outside Old Delhi, Delhi, India.

Like the major markets of Old Delhi, Sadar Bazaar is predisposed to serious chaos, buzzes and congestion with commercial activity. Although it is primarily a wholesale market, it also caters to occasional retail buyers. Owing to the sheer volumes that are traded here daily, a visit to the market can be termed sensory overload. In addition to serving as a market for traders, Sadar Bazaar is an Assembly constituency too. It is considered the largest wholesale market in India, with daily business transactions estimated at over ₹300 crore.

== History ==
Paharganj, also referred to as Shahganj or King's ganj or market place during the Mughal era, gets its present name (literally meaning Hilly neighbourhood) owing to its proximity to the Raisina Hill, where the Rashtrapati Bhavan stand today. Till 1857, neighbourhoods like Paharganj, Kishenganj, and Pahari Dhiraj were separate pockets which, in the following years, grew and merged: for example, Pahari Dhiraj got subsumed within Sadar Bazaar.

== Location and transportation ==
Sadar Bazaar is located on the western sector of the Khari Baoli street. It is connected to the rest of the city via buses (closest station is Kashmere Gate ISBT), auto-rickshaws and trains (closest metro station is RK Ashram Metro Station).

The area is also served by a railway station called Delhi Sadar Bazar (Code: DSB). It is 1 km (0.62 mi) away from the New Delhi railway station, and trains take about 9 to 15 minutes to reach it. The trains making a detour at this station are either EMUs, MEMUs or passenger trains consisting of general class seating arrangements.

== Commodities ==
Sadar Bazaar consists of numerous smaller markets, including Pratap market, Swadeshi market and Teliwara or Timber market. The market as a whole not only deals in household goods, but also in items such as toys, imitation jewellery, and stationery. It has also emerged as a den of counterfeit products manufactured by multi-national companies, FMCG products, and, foremost, cosmetic goods of a deceptively similar character. On this account, it was thus listed as a "notorious market" by the USTR in 2015 for selling counterfeit consumer goods and cosmetics.

Traders and shoppers have access to authentic Indian food, including delicacies deep-fried in ghee (clarified butter) and mithai (traditional sweets) of assorted kinds. The lanes are plenty and narrow, lined with shops selling imported goods, clothing, shoes and leather items, electronic and consumer goods, and more. The market, even more so than the rest of the city, is prone to severe congestion.

== Commercial activity and market ==
Considered by some to be the biggest wholesale market in Asia, accounts from local traders indicate that Sadar Bazaar suffers from frequent power cuts, over-congestion of stalls, improper maintenance of roads, absence of sanitation provisions, and perpetual traffic snarls.

The chaos notwithstanding, Sadar Bazaar remains a tourist attraction.

== Swadeshi Market ==
Swadeshi Market, a dense commercial cluster within Delhi’s Sadar Bazaar, consists of hundreds of small wholesale shops selling toys, artificial jewellery, gift items, and plastic goods. It is one of the busiest sections of Sadar Bazaar, with lanes organized by commodity and trader associations managing daily affairs.

== Administration and politics ==
Federation of Sadar Bazar Traders Association, a registered entity, is the parental organisation of all the major trade associations of Sadar Bazaar.

Sadar Bazaar is part of the Sadar-Paharganj constituency, one of the twelve administrative zones of Municipal Corporation of Delhi (MCD). As of 2015, this constituency is represented by Som Dutt of the Aam Aadmi Party. Prior to Dutt, this Vidhan Sabha constituency was represented by Rajesh Jain of the Indian National Congress (INC). Previously a separate parliamentary constituency, Sadar Bazaar became part of the Chandni Chowk Lok Sabha constituency following the delimitation of constituencies in 2008. Since 2024, Praveen Khandelwal of the Bharatiya Janata Party has represented the constituency.

== See also ==
- Arabber
- Bazaar
- Bazaari
- Chandni Chowk (Delhi Assembly constituency)
- Chandni Chowk (Lok Sabha constituency)
- Hawker centre (Asia) a centre where street food is sold
- Maligaon
- Market (place)
- Municipal Corporation of Delhi
- Peddler
- Retail
- Street vendor
- Street food
