= Shastri (surname) =

Shastri or Shastry is a surname found mainly in India. The word shastri translates to 'scholar'. It is derived from Sanskrit and means one who is proficient in the Shastras (ancient Indian texts). This surname mostly used by Brahmins and is also used by some Kayasthas.

Notable people with the surname include:

- Anant Maral Shastri (1912–1999), freedom fighter and scholar
- Dahyabhai Shastri, Indian scholar
- Dharam Dass Shastri, Indian politician
- Heera Lal Shastri (1899–1974), Indian politician and the first chief minister of Rajasthan state
- Keshavram Kashiram Shastri (1905–2006), founding leader of Vishwa Hindu Parishad
- Lal Bahadur Shastri (1904–1966), second prime minister of India
- Narayani Shastri (born 1968), television and theatre actress
- Pandurang Shastri Athavale (1920–2003), Indian philosopher also known as Dada-ji
- Prakash Vir Shastri (1923–1977), member of the Parliament of India (Sansad)
- Rajaram Shastri (1904–1991), Indian educationist
- Ram Nath Shastri (1914–2009), Dogri poet, Sahitya Akademi Fellow
- Ram Shastri (died 1772), Chief Justice in the apex court of the Maratha Empire
- Ratan Shastri (died 1998), Indian founder of Banasthali Vidyapith (now a university) and activist for women's rights
- Ravi Shastri (born 1962), Indian Test cricketer
- Satya Vrat Shastri (born 1930), Sanskrit scholar
- Shukraraj Shastri (1894–1941), Nepalese intellectual
- Shyama Shastri (1762–1827), Indian musician, composer of Carnatic music and oldest among the Trinity of Carnatic music
- Sirivennala Sitarama Shastri (born 1955), Telugu and Sanskrit poet
- Vagish Shastri (born 1934), Sanskrit grammarian who discovered a short cut way of learning Sanskrit
- Vishnu Kant Shastri (1929–2005), Indian politician who served as the governor of Uttar Pradesh and Himachal Pradesh
- Anant Krishna Shastry (born 1940), Indian historian
- Archana Shastry, Indian film actress
- B. Sriram Shastry (born 1950), Indian-American physicist
- Chamu Krishna Shastry (born 1956), Indian language activist
- H. Ramachandra Shastry (1906–1992), Indian Carnatic flautist
- Kala Nath Shastry (born 1936), Indologist, writer, and linguist
- Su. Rudramurthy Shastry (born 1984), Indian novelist

== See also ==
- Sastri
- Sastry
- Shastra
