= Delhi Kishanganj railway station =

Railway Station in Delhi, India

Delhi Kishanganj

General information
- Location: Old Rohtak Rd, Sarai Rohilla, Delhi NCT; India
- Coordinates: 28.6641°N 77.2002°E
- Elevation: 221 m (725 ft)
- System: Indian Railway and Delhi Suburban Railway station
- Owner: Indian Railways
- Line: Delhi Ring Railway
- Platforms: 3 BG
- Tracks: 6 BG
- Connections: Taxi Stand, Auto Stand

Construction
- Structure type: Standard (on ground station)
- Parking: Available
- Cycle facilities: Available
- Accessible: Disabled access

Other information
- Status: Functioning
- Station code: DKZ
- Zone(s): Northern Railway
- Division(s): Delhi railway division

Services
Preceding station	Indian Railways	Following station
Sadar Bazaar towards ?	Northern Railway zone Delhi Ring Railway	Vivekanand Puri (Sarai Rohilla) towards ?
Location
- Location within India Location within Haryana

Delhi Kishanganj railway station is a railway station situated in Old Rohtak Rd, Sarai Rohilla, Delhi NCT of Delhi. Its code is DKZ. The station is part of Delhi Suburban Railway. The station consists of three platforms.

== Major Trains ==
- Sirsa Express (14085/14086)
- Punjab Mail (12137/12138)
- Kalindi Express (14723/14724)
- Avadh Assam Express (15909/15910)

== See also ==
- Hazrat Nizamuddin railway station
- New Delhi Railway Station
- Delhi Junction Railway station
- Anand Vihar Railway Terminal
- Sarai Rohilla Railway Station
- Delhi Metro
