= Dilshad Garden metro station =

Metro station in Delhi, India

Dilshad Garden

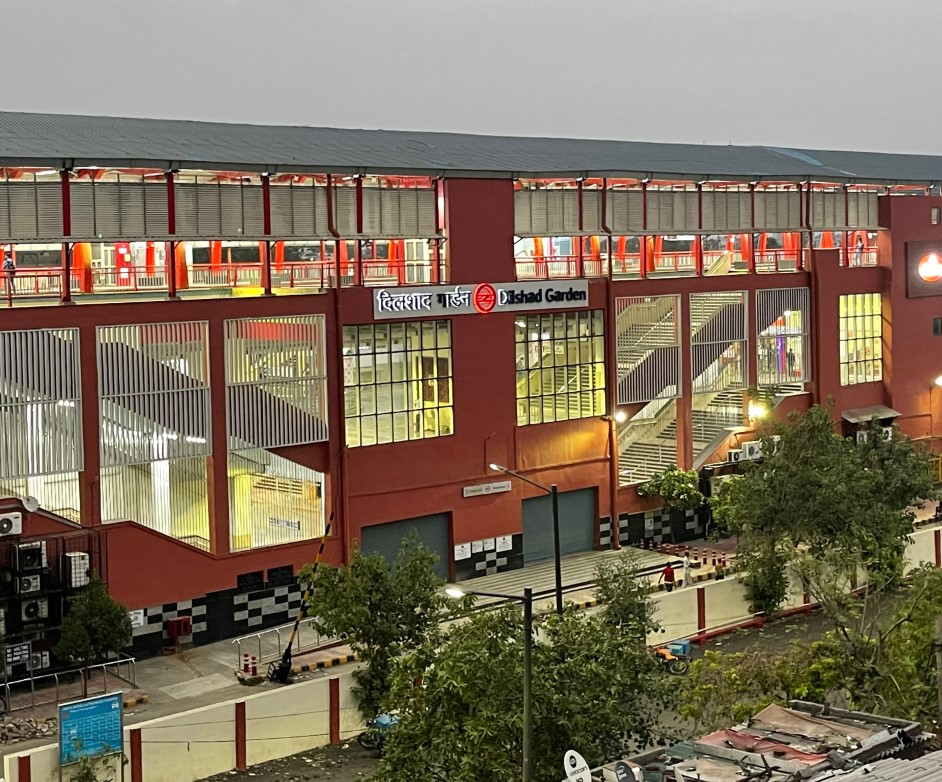

General information
- Location: GT Road, Dilshad Garden, Delhi 110095; India
- Coordinates: 28°40′33″N 77°19′17″E
- System: Delhi Metro station
- Owner: Delhi Metro
- Operator: Delhi Metro Rail Corporation (DMRC)
- Line: Red Line
- Platforms: Side platform Platform-1 → Rithala; Platform-2 → Shaheed Sthal (New Bus Adda)
- Tracks: 2

Construction
- Structure type: Elevated, Double Track
- Platform levels: 2
- Parking: Available
- Accessible: Yes

Other information
- Status: Staffed
- Station code: DSG

History
- Opened: 4 June 2008; 18 years ago
- Electrified: 25 kV 50 Hz AC through overhead catenary

Passengers
- Jan 2015: 33,296/day 10,32,191 Month average

Services
Preceding station	Delhi Metro	Following station
Jhilmil towards Rithala	Red Line	Shaheed Nagar towards Shaheed Sthal (New Bus Adda)
Route map
Location

Dilshad Garden is an elevated metro station on the Red Line of the Delhi Metro, located in northeast Delhi.

It served as the eastern terminus of the Red Line from its opening on 3 June 2008 until 8 March 2019, when the extension towards Shaheed Sthal (New Bus Adda) was inaugurated. Passenger services on the extended section commenced on 9 March 2019.

== Station layout ==
L2	Side platform | Doors will open on the left
L2	Platform 2 Eastbound	Towards → Shaheed Sthal (New Bus Adda); Next Station: Shaheed Nagar (Delhi-UP Border)
L2	Platform 1 Westbound	Towards ← Rithala; Next Station: Jhilmil
L2	Side platform | Doors will open on the left
L1	Concourse	Fare control, station agent, Metro Card vending machines, crossover
G	Street Level	Exit/Entrance

== Facilities ==
The station has the following facilities:

- ATM: PNB ATM near gate no. 1
- Toilet: Sulabh Toilet near gate no. 1
- Shop/Office: Mahindra near gate no. 1 and Ford, Northern Star Jewellery and Bata Footwears near gate No. 2
- Bank: IndusInd Bank on the ground floor
- Insurance: ICICI Lombard on the unpaid concourse
- Kiosk: SBI Credit Card near gate no. 2
- Water: PILO Water Kiosk near gate no. 2
- Food / Restaurant: Pizza Hut, Burger King, McDonald's and Haldiram's near gate no. 2 and Bar Shala on the unpaid concourse

== Connections ==
- DTC buses:
  - From the nearby Shahdara Border (Dilshad Garden Metro Station) bus stop, DTC bus routes number 33C, 125EXT, 163, 971 100EXT, 165, 165A, 166, 212, 214CL, 216, 221, 236, 236EXT, 333, 341, 623EXT, 939, 939EXT and 982 serve the station.
  - A little farther away on the Aradhak Marg, from the Shahdara Border bus stop, DTC bus routes number 0OMS(-), 33, 33A, 33EXT, 33LINKSTL, 33LNKSTL, 33LSTL, 214CL, 243A, 243B, 246, 336A, 3361LNKSTL, 340, 340STL, 396, 542, 534SPL, 623EXT, 623LNKSTL, 971, 982, OMS(+) AC, OMS(-) and YMS(-) serve the station.
- Delhi Metro feeder buses:
  - Feeder bus service ML-53 starts from Dilshad Garden metro station and ends at Mayur Vihar Ph-III. It passes through the following bus stops: Surya Nagar (Indian Oil Petrol Pump), Ram Prastha Xing, Anand Vihar ISBT, Gazi Pur Depot, Gazi Pur Village, Trilok Puri Mod, Dallu Pura Mod, Mayur Vihar Phase-III Xing, Bharti Public School and CRPF camp.
  - Feeder bus service MC-341 starts from Mayur Vihar Ph-III and ends at Harsh Vihar. It passes through the following bus stops: CRPF Camp, Mayur Vihar III A-1, Bharti Public School, New Kondli A-1, Mayur Vihar Phase-3 Mor, Mayur Vihar Phase-3 X-ing, Ganpati Mandir, Fire Station Dallupura, Dallupura, Kondli, Kalyanpuri Mor, Gazipur Dairy, Gazipur X-ing NH-24, Gazipur Village, Tata Telco, Gazipur Depot, Anand Vihar Metro Station, Anand Vihar ISBT, Ram Prastha X-ing, Ram Prastha Mandir, Surya Nagar, Dilshad Garden Metro Station, Shahdra Border, Shahdra Border, Dilshad Garden J&K Block, Old Seemapuri, Seemapuri Depot, Dlf X-ing, Radha Krishna Mandir, Anand Gram, Tahirpur, Mata Mandir and Sunder Nagri/ Gagan Cinema.

== See also ==
- Delhi
- List of Delhi Metro stations
- Transport in Delhi
- Delhi Metro Rail Corporation
- Delhi Suburban Railway
- List of rapid transit systems in India
- List of Metro Systems
- National Capital Region (India)
