= Delhi Metro Rail Corporation =

Indian metro railway company which serves Delhi and its sister cities

Delhi Metro Rail Corporation (DMRC)
- Type: Centre-State owned
- Industry: Public transport
- Founded: 3 May 1995; 31 years ago New Delhi, Delhi, India
- Headquarters: New Delhi, Delhi, Republic of India
- Key people: Srinivas Katikithala (Secretary of MoHUA & Chairman); Vikas Kumar (Managing Director)
- Services: Delhi Metro, consultancy and implementation of metro rail, monorail and high-speed rail
- Revenue: ▲₹6,645 crore (US$690 million) (2023)
- Operating income: ▲₹811 crore (US$84 million) (2023)
- Net income: ▲₹−1,569 crore (US$−160 million) (2023)
- Total assets: ▼₹77,731 crore (US$8.1 billion) (2023)
- Total equity: ▼₹23,359 crore (US$2.4 billion) (2023)
- Owners: Government of India (50%); Government of Delhi (50%)
- Website: www.delhimetrorail.com

Delhi Metro Rail Corporation (DMRC) is a centre-state joint venture that operates the Delhi Metro, Rapid Metro Gurgaon, Noida Metro, Patna Metro and Mumbai Metro Line 3. The DMRC is also involved in the planning and implementation of metro rail, monorail, and high-speed rail projects in India, and abroad. The work of the DMRC is fragmented into various parts which are controlled by directors under the direction of a managing director.

== History ==
The Delhi Metro Rail Corporation Ltd. was created on 3 May 1995 with E. Sreedharan serving as its first managing director. Sreedharan handed over charge as managing director of the DMRC to Mangu Singh on 31 December 2011.

To mark its 10th anniversary in 2010, Delhi Metro introduced an 8 coach train for the first time. A commemorative souvenir book titled "Delhi Metro: A Decade of Dedication, 10 Years of Metro Operations" was also released. An exclusive 'METRO SONG-zindagi hai Delhi metro' composed by music director Vaibhav Saxena was also released and played at metro stations and FM stations.

== Policy and awards ==
The DMRC has made it compulsory to wear safety helmets on construction sites. It also earns carbon credits with rainwater harvesting at metro stations and runs an HIV/AIDS programme for workers.

The DMRC received Outstanding PSU of the Year (2016) award conferred by All India Management Association (AIMA). The DMRC was also awarded for its "Outstanding Contribution" for promoting world-class services in Urban Transportation and adopting best practices of Project Management.

== Other projects ==
=== Consultancy ===
The DMRC has a business development department for consultancy services. The DMRC has served as the project consultant and has project reports (DPR) for every metro and monorail project in India, except the Kolkata Metro and Chennai MRTS, which were constructed before the formation of the DMRC. The DMRC also provides lighter consultancy operations, such as preparation of DPRs and feasibility reports for proposed systems in places such as Raipur, Amritsar and Nagpur. The DMRC also serves as consultant and prepared the DPR for the proposed Thiruvananthapuram - Mangalore High-Speed Passenger Corridor.

In September 2012, the DMRC entered into a partnership with eight other international companies for management consulting for the Jakarta Mass Rapid Transit system. This was the DMRC's first project outside India. The DMRC stated that its main responsibilities in the JV were the "finalisation of the organisational structure of the Jakarta Metro, recruitment of personnel, development of training facilities and the training of the employees for various categories required for commencing the operations".

In February 2014, the DMRC was invited by the Government of Kuwait to act as a consultant for the proposed metro system in Kuwait City, Kuwait.

=== Implementation ===
The DMRC is involved with the implementation and/or construction of Kochi Metro, Jaipur Metro, Lucknow Metro, Hyderabad Metro and Patna Metro.

=== Delhi Metro Rail Academy ===
The Delhi Metro Rail Academy (erstwhile DMRC Training Institute; renamed to DMRA on 18 September 2019 after a major upgrade) is a dedicated training institute that was set up and inaugurated on 19 July 2002 in the DMRC's Shastri Park depot. It is the only metro rail training institute in South Asia. Over its history, the DMRC has trained over 63,000 of its trainees here, along with over 2,000 staff of many organizations, mainly metro rails, from both India and abroad. DMRA's international clients include Jakarta MRT, Indonesia and Dhaka Metro Rail, Bangladesh, while its Indian clients include Namma Metro, Kochi Metro, Chennai Metro, Jaipur Metro, Mumbai Metro, and many more metros and other organizations.

The DMRC in partnership with the Indian Institute of Technology Delhi offers a one-year postgraduate diploma in metro technology. The course produces 25 executives of various streams, viz. Electrical, Civil, Architecture, Signalling, and Telecom, a year to staff metros across India. The Indian Institute of Technology Madras also offers a similar course for the Chennai Metro.

== See also ==
- Delhi Metro
- National Capital Region Transport Corporation
- Rapid transit in India
