= Rithala metro station =

Metro station in Delhi, India

Rithala

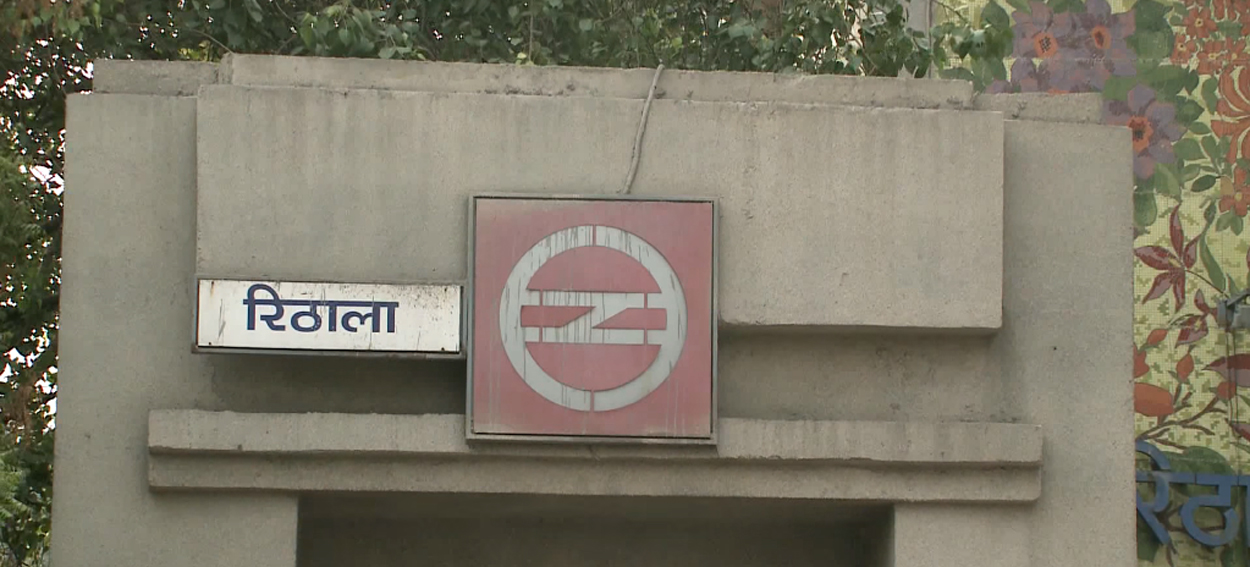
- Rithala Metro Station

General information
- Location: Bhagwan Mahavir Marg, Varun Kunj, Rithala, Sector 5, Rohini, Delhi, 110085, India.
- Coordinates: 28°43′15″N 77°06′25″E
- System: Delhi Metro station
- Line: Red Line
- Platforms: Side platform Platform-1 → Train Terminates Here; Platform-2 → Shaheed Sthal (New Bus Adda)
- Tracks: 2
- Connections: Bus transport

Construction
- Structure type: Elevated
- Parking: Available
- Accessible: Yes

Other information
- Station code: RI

History
- Opened: 31 March 2004
- Electrified: 25 kV 50 Hz AC through overhead catenary

Services
Preceding station	Delhi Metro	Following station
Terminus	Red Line	Dr. Baba Saheb Ambedkar Hospital towards Shaheed Sthal (New Bus Adda)
Route map
Location

Rithala is an elevated metro station on the Red Line of the Delhi Metro, located in Sector 5 of Rohini, North-West Delhi. It serves as the northern terminal of the Red Line and commenced commercial operations on 31 March 2004, following the opening of the Inderlok–Rithala section. This completed the original Shahdara–Rithala corridor of the network's Phase I expansion.

The station is also the starting point of the approved Rithala–Narela–Nathupur (Kundli) extension under Phase IV of the Delhi Metro. The proposed 26.46 kilometres (16.44 mi) corridor will extend the Red Line into Narela and neighbouring areas of Haryana, including Kundli and Nathupur.

The station is located within walking distance of Metro Walk, a shopping and entertainment complex, and Adventure Island, an amusement park in Sector 10, Rohini.

== Station layout ==
L2	Side platform | Doors will open on the left
L2	Platform 2 Eastbound	Towards → Shaheed Sthal (New Bus Adda); Next Station: Dr. Baba Saheb Ambedkar Hospital
L2	Platform 1 Westbound	Towards ← Train Terminates Here
L2	Side platform | Doors will open on the left
L1	Concourse	Fare control, station agent, Metro Card vending machines, crossover
G	Street Level	Exit/Entrance

== See also ==
- List of Delhi Metro stations
- Transport in Delhi
