= Shaheed Sthal (New Bus Adda) metro station =

Station in Ghaziabad, Uttar Pradesh, India

Shaheed Sthal (New Bus Adda)

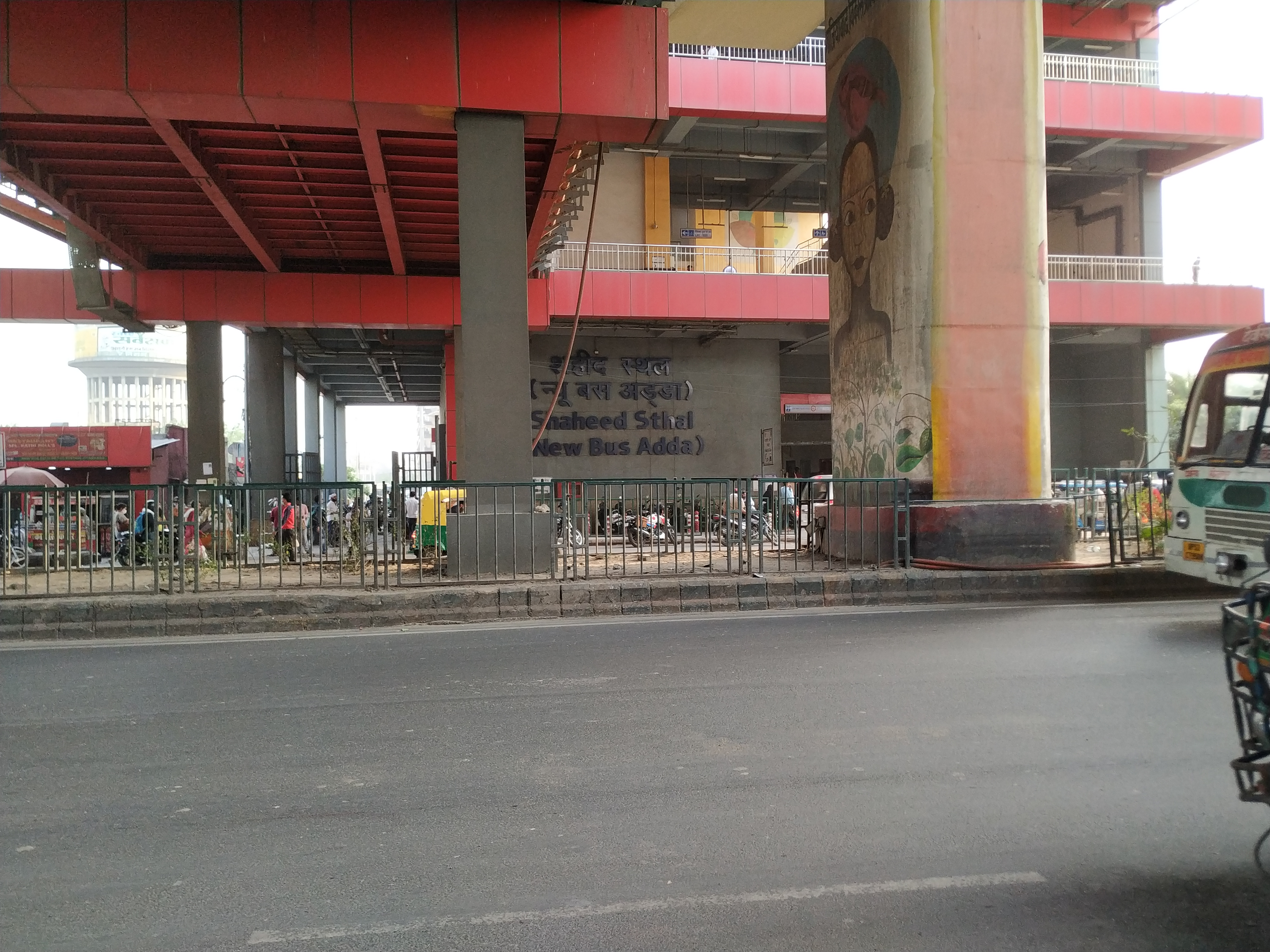
- Shaheed Sthal metro station

General information
- Location: GT Road, New Bus Stand, Ghaziabad, Uttar Pradesh; India
- Coordinates: 28°40′14″N 77°24′56″E
- System: Delhi Metro station
- Owner: Delhi Metro Rail Corporation
- Line: Red Line
- Platforms: Side platform Platform-1 → Rithala; Platform-2 → Train terminates here
- Tracks: 2
- Connections: Ghaziabad

Construction
- Structure type: Elevated
- Platform levels: 2
- Accessible: Yes

Other information
- Station code: NBAA

History
- Opened: 8 March 2019
- Electrified: 25 kV 50 Hz AC through overhead catenary

Services
Preceding station	Delhi Metro	Following station
Hindon River towards Rithala	Red Line	Terminus
Route map
Location

Shaheed Sthal (New Bus Adda) is an elevated terminal metro station on the Red Line of the Delhi Metro, located in Ghaziabad, Uttar Pradesh. The station is situated near the Ghaziabad New Bus Stand on Grand Trunk Road. It was formerly known as New Bus Adda and was renamed in 2019 in memory of the martyrs of the Indian Rebellion of 1857.

== History ==
The station was originally named New Bus Adda. In February 2019, the Uttar Pradesh government approved a proposal to rename it Shaheed Sthal, following requests from local residents and organisations submitted through the Ghaziabad Development Authority and district administration. The name was chosen in memory of the martyrs of the Indian Rebellion of 1857.

The area holds historical significance due to a battle fought near the Hindon River on 30 and 31 May 1857, when Indian fighters resisted British forces advancing towards Delhi from Meerut. The station was inaugurated on 8 March 2019 as part of the Dilshad Garden–New Bus Adda extension of the Red Line, and passenger services commenced the following day.

== Station layout ==
L2	Side platform | Doors will open on the left
L2	Platform 2 Eastbound	Towards → Train Terminates Here
L2	Platform 1 Westbound	Towards ← Rithala; Next Station: Hindon River
L2	Side platform | Doors will open on the left
L1	Concourse	Fare control, station agent, Metro Card vending machines, crossover
G	Street Level	Exit and Entrance

== See also ==
- List of Delhi Metro stations
- Transport in Delhi
- Delhi Metro Rail Corporation
- Delhi Suburban Railway
- List of rapid transit systems in India
- Delhi Transport Corporation
- List of Metro Systems
- National Capital Region (India)
- Ghaziabad district, Uttar Pradesh
