= Ashram metro station =

Metro station in Delhi, India

Ashram

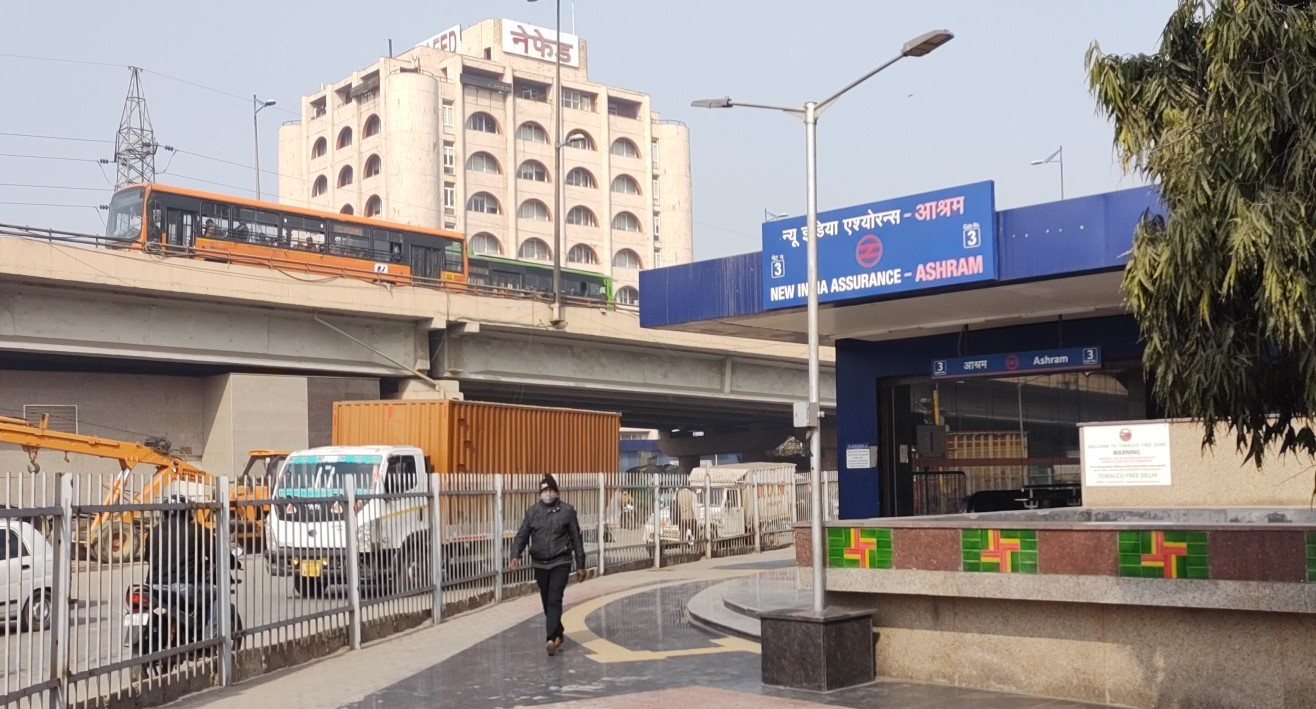

General information
- Location: Block A, Friends Colony East, New Friends Colony, Ashram, New Delhi, Delhi, 110065
- Coordinates: 28°34′20″N 77°15′31″E
- System: Delhi Metro station
- Owner: Delhi Metro
- Operator: Delhi Metro Rail Corporation (DMRC)
- Line: Pink Line
- Platforms: Island platform Platform 1 → "-" Circular Line; Platform 2 → "+" Circular Line
- Tracks: 2

Construction
- Structure type: Underground, double-track
- Platform levels: 3
- Accessible: Yes

Other information
- Status: Staffed, Operational
- Station code: AHRM

History
- Opened: 31 December 2018; 7 years ago
- Electrified: 25 kV 50 Hz AC through overhead catenary

Services
Preceding station	Delhi Metro	Following station
Vinobapuri towards Maujpur - Babarpur	Pink Line	Sarai Kale Khan - Nizamuddin towards Shiv Vihar
Route map
Location

Ashram is a metro station under Delhi Metro serving the Pink Line. As a part of Phase III of Delhi Metro, the station was opened for public use from 31 December 2018.

== Construction ==
The station is approximately 151.6 metres against an overall average of 265 metres of all metro stations under Delhi Metro, having the station to be the smallest in the system. Unlike the mostly-used two-level architecture of most metro stations, Ashram has 3 levels. Apart from the concourse and platform levels, another level called the mezzanine floor has been added.

== Station layout ==
G	Street level	Exit/Entrance
C	Concourse	Fare control, station agent, Ticket/token, shops
M	Mezzanine
P	Platform 1 Anticlockwise	"-" Circular Line (Anticlockwise); Via: Sarai Kale Khan - Nizamuddin, Mayur Vihar-I, Shree Ram Mandir Mayur Vihar, Trilokpuri - Sanjay Lake, IP Extension, Anand Vihar, Karkarduma, Welcome, Maujpur - Babarpur, Yamuna Vihar, Bhajanpura, Nanaksar - Sonia Vihar, Jagatpur - Wazirabad, Burari, Majlis Park, Azadpur, Shalimar Bagh, Netaji Subhash Place, Punjabi Bagh West; Next Station: Sarai Kale Khan - Nizamuddin
P	Island platform | Doors will open on the left
P	Platform 2 Clockwise	"+" Circular Line (Clockwise); Via: Vinobapuri, Lajpat Nagar, South Extension, Dilli Haat - INA, Sarojini Nagar, Bhikaji Cama Place, Sir M. Vishweshwaraiah Moti Bagh, Durgabai Deshmukh South Campus, Delhi Cantt., Naraina Vihar, Mayapuri, Rajouri Garden; Next Station: Vinobapuri

== Entry/Exit ==
Ashram metro station Entry/exits
Gate No-1	Gate No-2	Gate No-3
Hari Nagar Ashram	NAFED	Maharani Bagh and New; Friends colony
Fire Station Mathura Road (Damkal kendra)	Siddharth Enclave and DESU colony	CSIR Apartments
Bhogal	Jeewan Nagar and Village Kilokari	Mathura Road

== Connections ==
=== Bus ===
Delhi Transport Corporation bus routes number 274, 306, 400, 402CL, 403, 403CL, 403STL, 404, 404LinkSTL, 405, 405A, 405ASTL,410, 418A, 418ALnkSTL, 460, 460CL, 460STL, 473, 473A, 473CL, 479, 479CL, 479STL, 507CL, 507STL, 894, 894CL, 894STL, AC-479, AC-724A, Ballabgarh Bus Stand – Panipat, Ballabgarh Bus Stand – Sonipat, serves the station.

== See also ==
- Delhi
- List of Delhi Metro stations
- Transport in Delhi
- Delhi Metro Rail Corporation
- Delhi Suburban Railway
- Inner Ring Road, Delhi
- Delhi Monorail
- Delhi Transport Corporation
- South Delhi
- Lajpat Nagar
- New Delhi
- National Capital Region (India)
- List of rapid transit systems
- List of metro systems
