= Vinobapuri metro station =

Metro station in Delhi, India

Vinobapuri

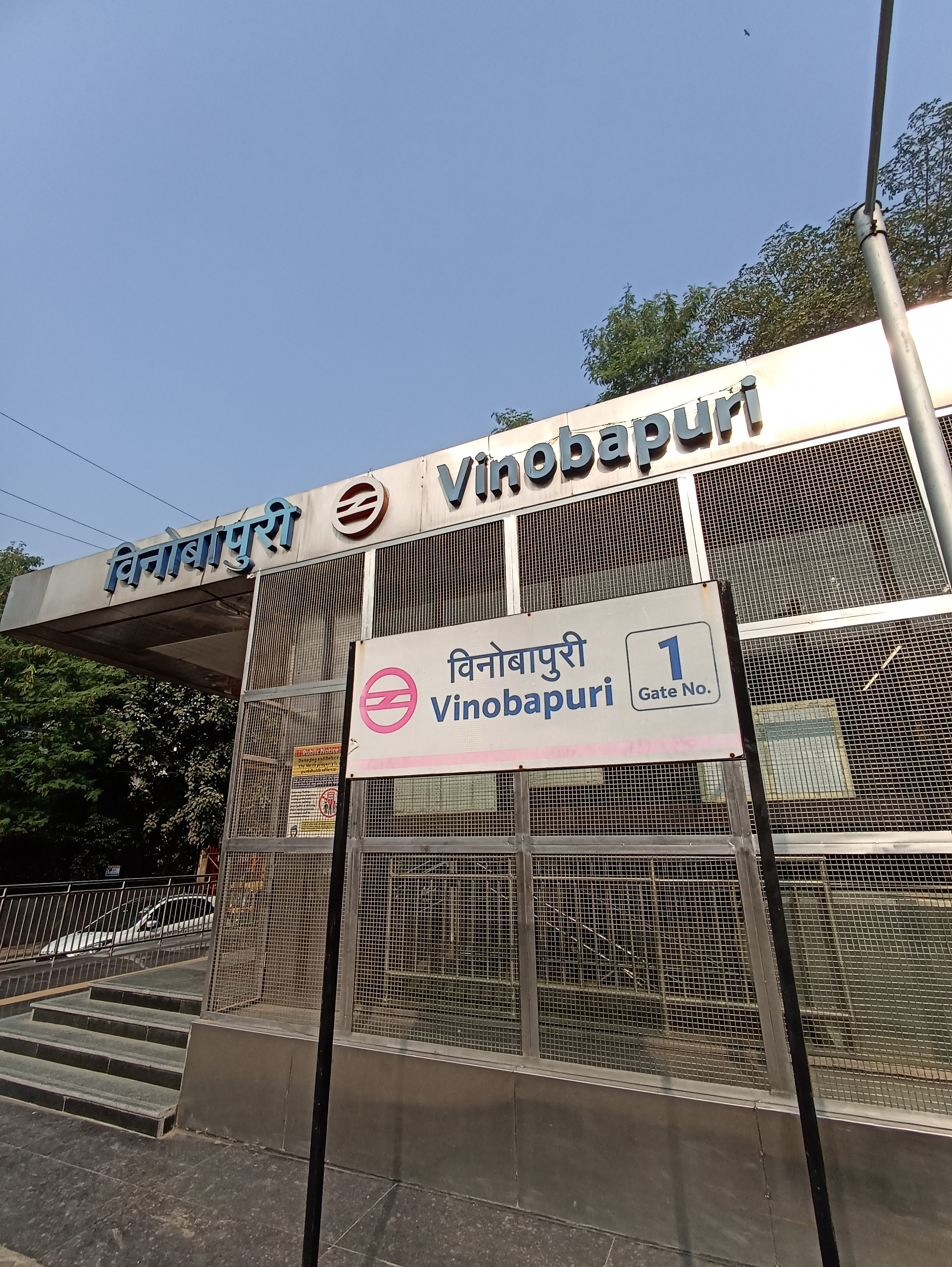

General information
- Location: Mahatma Gandhi Marg, Vinoba Puri, near Lajpat Nagar, New Delhi, Delhi,110024
- Coordinates: 28°33′57″N 77°15′02″E
- System: Delhi Metro station
- Owner: Delhi Metro
- Operator: Delhi Metro Rail Corporation (DMRC)
- Line: Pink Line
- Platforms: Island platform Platform 1 → "-" Circular Line; Platform 2 → "+" Circular Line
- Tracks: 2

Construction
- Structure type: Underground, double-track
- Platform levels: 2
- Accessible: Yes

Other information
- Status: Staffed, Operational
- Station code: VNPR

History
- Opened: 31 December 2018; 7 years ago
- Electrified: 25 kV 50 Hz AC through overhead catenary

Services
| Preceding station | Delhi Metro | Following station |
|---|---|---|
| Lajpat Nagar towards Maujpur - Babarpur | Pink Line | Ashram towards Shiv Vihar |
Route map
Location

Vinobapuri is a metro station under Delhi Metro serving the Pink Line. The station was opened for public on 31 December 2018, as a part of Phase III of Delhi Metro.

== Station layout ==
| G | Street level | Exit/Entrance |
| C | Concourse | Fare control, station agent, Ticket/token, shops |
| P | Platform 1 Anticlockwise | "-" Circular Line (Anticlockwise); Via: Ashram, Sarai Kale Khan - Nizamuddin, Mayur Vihar-I, Shree Ram Mandir Mayur Vihar, Trilokpuri - Sanjay Lake, IP Extension, Anand Vihar, Karkarduma, Welcome, Maujpur - Babarpur, Yamuna Vihar, Bhajanpura, Nanaksar - Sonia Vihar, Jagatpur - Wazirabad, Burari, Majlis Park, Azadpur, Shalimar Bagh, Netaji Subhash Place; Next Station: Ashram |
| P | Island platform | Doors will open on the left |
| P | Platform 2 Clockwise | "+" Circular Line (Clockwise); Via: Lajpat Nagar, South Extension, Dilli Haat - INA, Sarojini Nagar, Bhikaji Cama Place, Sir M. Vishweshwaraiah Moti Bagh, Durgabai Deshmukh South Campus, Delhi Cantt., Naraina Vihar, Mayapuri, Rajouri Garden, ESI - Basaidarapur; Next Station: Lajpat Nagar; Change at the next station for Violet Line |

== Entry/Exit ==
Vinobapuri metro station Entry/exits
| Gate No-1 | Gate No-2 |
|---|---|
| Lajpat Nagar - II | Sriniwas Puri |
| Delhi Public Library | Nehru Nagar |

== Nearby ==
Lajpat Nagar Central Market, Amar Colony, Defence Colony, Acharya Munir Ashram, Eye7 Hospital, Push Sports Cricket Academy, Dev Samaj Modern School, Lal Bahadur Shastri Library, Habilite Clinics,

== Connections ==
=== Bus ===
Delhi Transport Corporation bus routes number 47A, 47ACL, 323, 400, 410, 410CL, 433CL, 433LnkSTL, 460CL, 542, 543A, 567, 611, 611A, 702, 711A, AC - Anand Vihar ISBT Terminal - Gurugram Bus Stand, AC-724A, Anand Vihar ISBT Terminal - Gurugram Bus Stand, CS-13A, CS-13B, TMS+Punjabi Bagh, serves the station.

== See also ==
- Delhi
- List of Delhi Metro stations
- Transport in Delhi
- Delhi Metro Rail Corporation
- Delhi Suburban Railway
- Inner Ring Road, Delhi
- Delhi Monorail
- Delhi Transport Corporation
- South Delhi
- Lajpat Nagar
- New Delhi
- National Capital Region (India)
- List of rapid transit systems
- List of metro systems
