= Bhikaji Cama Place metro station =

Metro station in Delhi, India

Bhikaji Cama Place

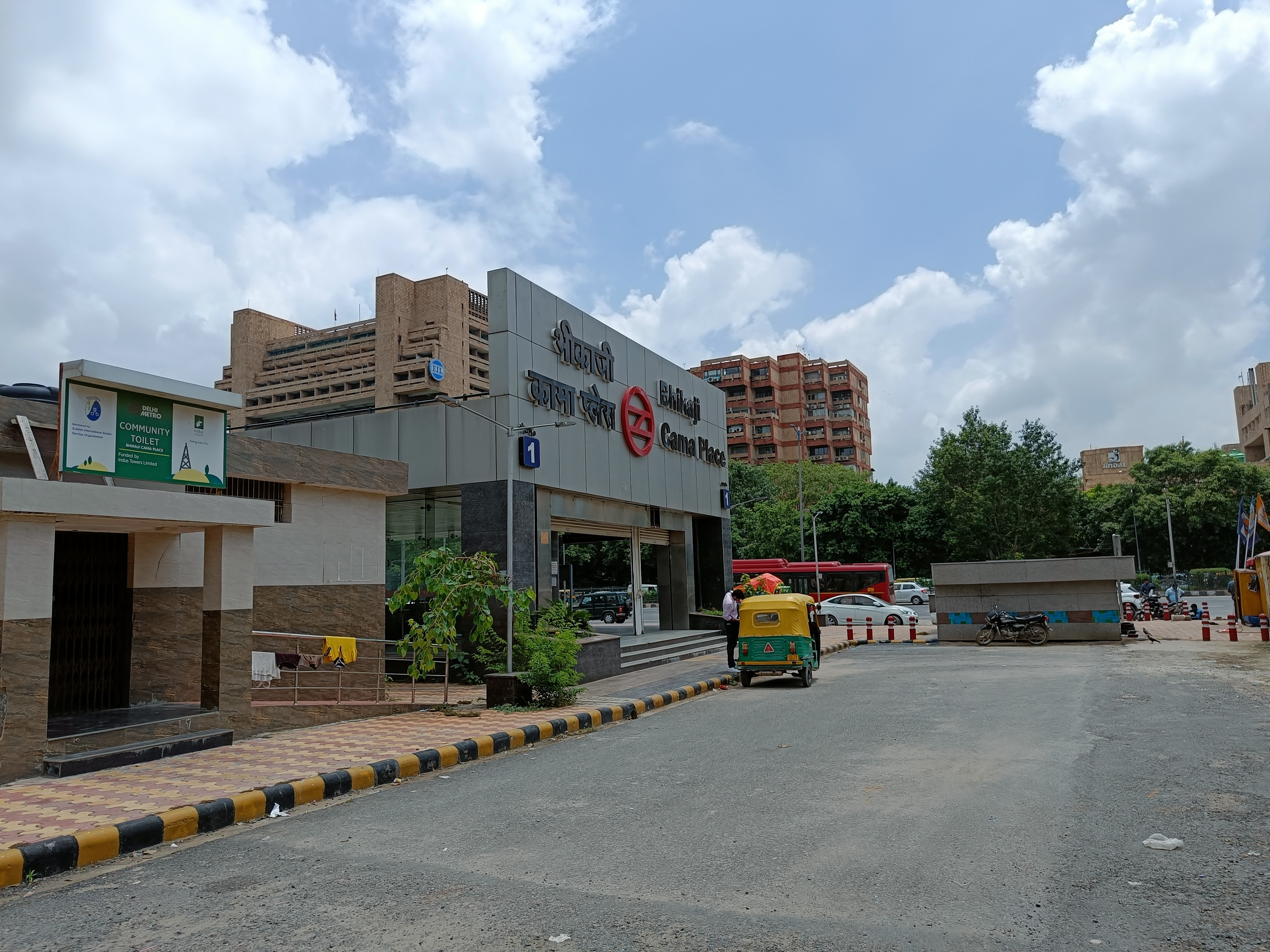

General information
- Location: Mahatma Gandhi Marg, Block A, Netaji Nagar, Bhikaji Cama Place, New Delhi, 110023
- Coordinates: 28°34′13″N 77°11′16″E
- System: Delhi Metro station
- Owner: Delhi Metro
- Operator: Delhi Metro Rail Corporation (DMRC)
- Line: Pink Line
- Platforms: Island platform Platform 1 → "-" Circular Line; Platform 2 → "+" Circular Line
- Tracks: 2

Construction
- Structure type: Underground, double-track
- Depth: 18 metres (59 ft)
- Platform levels: 2
- Accessible: Yes

Other information
- Status: Staffed, Operational
- Station code: BKCP

History
- Opened: 6 August 2018; 8 years ago
- Electrified: 25 kV 50 Hz AC through overhead catenary

Services
Preceding station	Delhi Metro	Following station
Sir M. Vishweshwaraiah Moti Bagh towards Maujpur - Babarpur	Pink Line	Sarojini Nagar towards Shiv Vihar
Route map
Location

Bhikaji Cama Place is a metro station located on the Pink Line of the Delhi Metro. The station was opened on 6 August 2018, and is situated on the Ring Road in Bhikaji Cama Place, which is named after Bhikaji Cama, an Indian freedom fighter, who is credited with creating an early version of the Flag of India based on the Calcutta Flag.

== Station layout ==
G	Street level	Exit/Entrance
C	Concourse	Fare control, station agent, Ticket/token, shops
P	Platform 1 Anticlockwise	"-" Circular Line (Anticlockwise); Via: Sarojini Nagar, Dilli Haat - INA, South Extension, Lajpat Nagar, Vinobapuri, Ashram, Sarai Kale Khan - Nizamuddin, Mayur Vihar-I, Shree Ram Mandir Mayur Vihar, Trilokpuri - Sanjay Lake, IP Extension, Anand Vihar, Karkarduma, Welcome, Maujpur - Babarpur, Yamuna Vihar, Bhajanpura, Nanaksar - Sonia Vihar, Jagatpur - Wazirabad, Burari, Majlis Park; Next Station: Sarojini Nagar
P	Island platform | Doors will open on the right
P	Platform 2 Clockwise	"+" Circular Line (Clockwise); Via: Sir M. Vishweshwaraiah Moti Bagh, Durgabai Deshmukh South Campus, Delhi Cantt., Naraina Vihar, Mayapuri, Rajouri Garden, ESI - Basaidarapur, Punjabi Bagh West, Shakurpur, Netaji Subhash Place, Shalimar Bagh, Azadpur; Next Station: Sir M. Vishweshwaraiah Moti Bagh

== Entry/Exit ==
Bhikaji Cama Place metro station Entry/exits
Gate No-1	Gate No-2	Gate No-3

== Connections ==
=== Bus ===
Delhi Transport Corporation bus routes number 323, 392, 392B, 398, 442, 448EXT, 479, 479CL, 529SPL, 543A, 567, 567A, 568, 568A, 569, 588, 611A, 711, 711A, 724, 724C, 724EXT, 780, 794, 794A, 864, 874, 984A, AC-479, AC-711, AC-724, AC-724A Anand Vihar ISBT Terminal – Gurugram Bus Stand, Anand Vihar ISBT Terminal – Gurugram Bus Stand AC TMS (-) TMS-Azadpur-Lajpat, TMS-LajpatNagar, TMS-PBagh serves the station from nearby Hyatt Hotel bus stop.

== See also ==
- Delhi
- List of Delhi Metro stations
- Transport in Delhi
- Delhi Metro Rail Corporation
- Delhi Suburban Railway
- Inner Ring Road, Delhi
- South Extension
- Delhi Monorail
- Delhi Transport Corporation
- South Delhi
- New Delhi
- National Capital Region (India)
- List of rapid transit systems
- List of metro systems
