= Soorghat metro station =

Metro station in Delhi, India

Soorghat

General information
- System: Delhi Metro station
- Owner: Delhi Metro
- Operator: Delhi Metro Rail Corporation (DMRC)
- Line: Pink Line
- Platforms: Side platform Platform 1 → "-" Circular Line; Platform 2 → "+" Circular Line
- Tracks: 2

Construction
- Structure type: Elevated, Double-track
- Platform levels: 2
- Accessible: Yes

Other information
- Status: Concourse under construction

History
- Opening: Late 2026
- Electrified: 25 kV 50 Hz AC through overhead catenary

Services
Preceding station	Delhi Metro	Following station
Nanaksar - Sonia Vihar towards Maujpur - Babarpur	Pink Line	Jagatpur - Wazirabad towards Shiv Vihar
The station is not operational and is thus skipped from the Circular Line services
Route map
Location

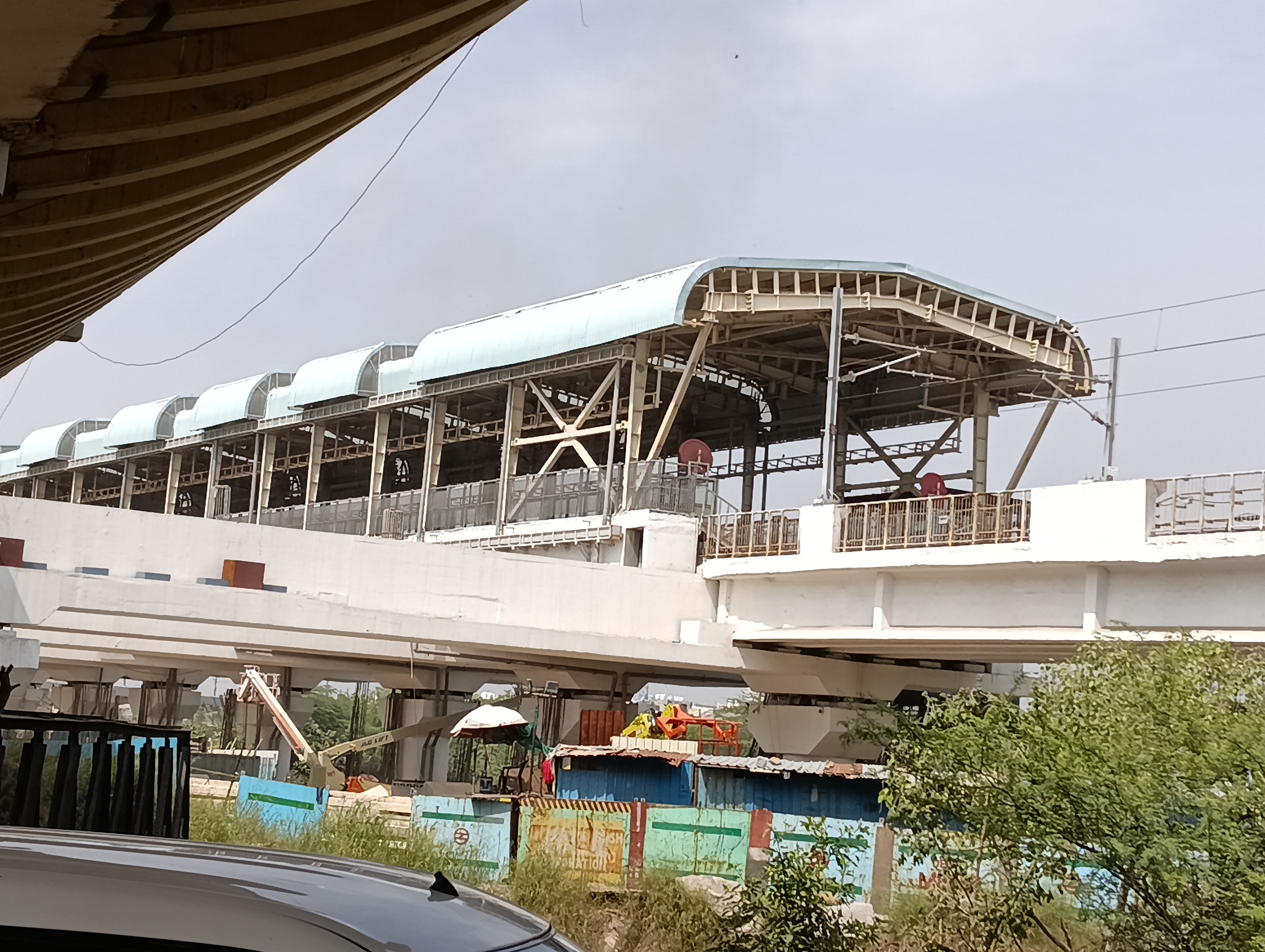
Soorghat metro station, with its concourse still under construction. It is the only station on the Pink Line's circular route that remains unopened.

The Soorghat metro station is a station on the Pink Line of the Delhi Metro. It is part of the Phase IV of Delhi Metro.

Soorghat is the only station on the Pink Line's circular route that is bypassed by trains. Although its platforms and main structure have been constructed, the station remains unopened due to incomplete access infrastructure. Its entry and exit points are designed to connect through a subway integrated with the Public Works Department's infrastructure in the area. The subway's delayed construction has prevented the station from becoming operational. In June 2026, DMRC floated a tender for the remaining construction work, including the vehicular underpass. Until the station becomes operational, commuters have to use the adjacent stations.

== See also ==
- List of Delhi Metro stations
- Delhi Transport Corporation
- Transport in Delhi
- Pink Line (Delhi Metro)
