= VNPR =

VNPR may refer to:

- VNPR, the Delhi Metro station code for Vinobapuri metro station, New Delhi, India
- VNPR, the ICAO code for Pokhara International Airport, Gandaki Province, Nepal
