= Unity One Elegante Mall =

- Location: Netaji Subhash Place, Pithampura, Delhi
- Coordinates: 28.696°N 77.151°E
- Opened: 16 October 2025
- Developer: Parshvnath Developers
- Owner: Unity Group
- Num. of stores: 100
- Floors: 4
- Parking: Multilevel
- Public transit: Netaji Subhash Place metro station
- Website: https://unityoneelegante.com/

Unity One Elegante Mall is a shopping mall located in Netaji Subhash Place, Pitampura, Delhi. It is owned and operated by Unity Group and opened its doors on 16 October 2025.

The mall is spread over 4 floors, and has a dedicated area of over 500,000 sq ft. It has 300,000 leasing area for shopping brands.

== Amenities ==
=== Stores ===
- The mall is home to many international brands like CaratLane, Allen Solly, Vanheusen, Lifestyle, Sunglass Hut, Zen Diamond, NEWME and Go Colors.

=== Entertainment ===
- It also has a 4-screen multiplex, a dedicated spacious food court and a gaming zone.
