= South Extension metro station =

Delhi Metro station

South Extension

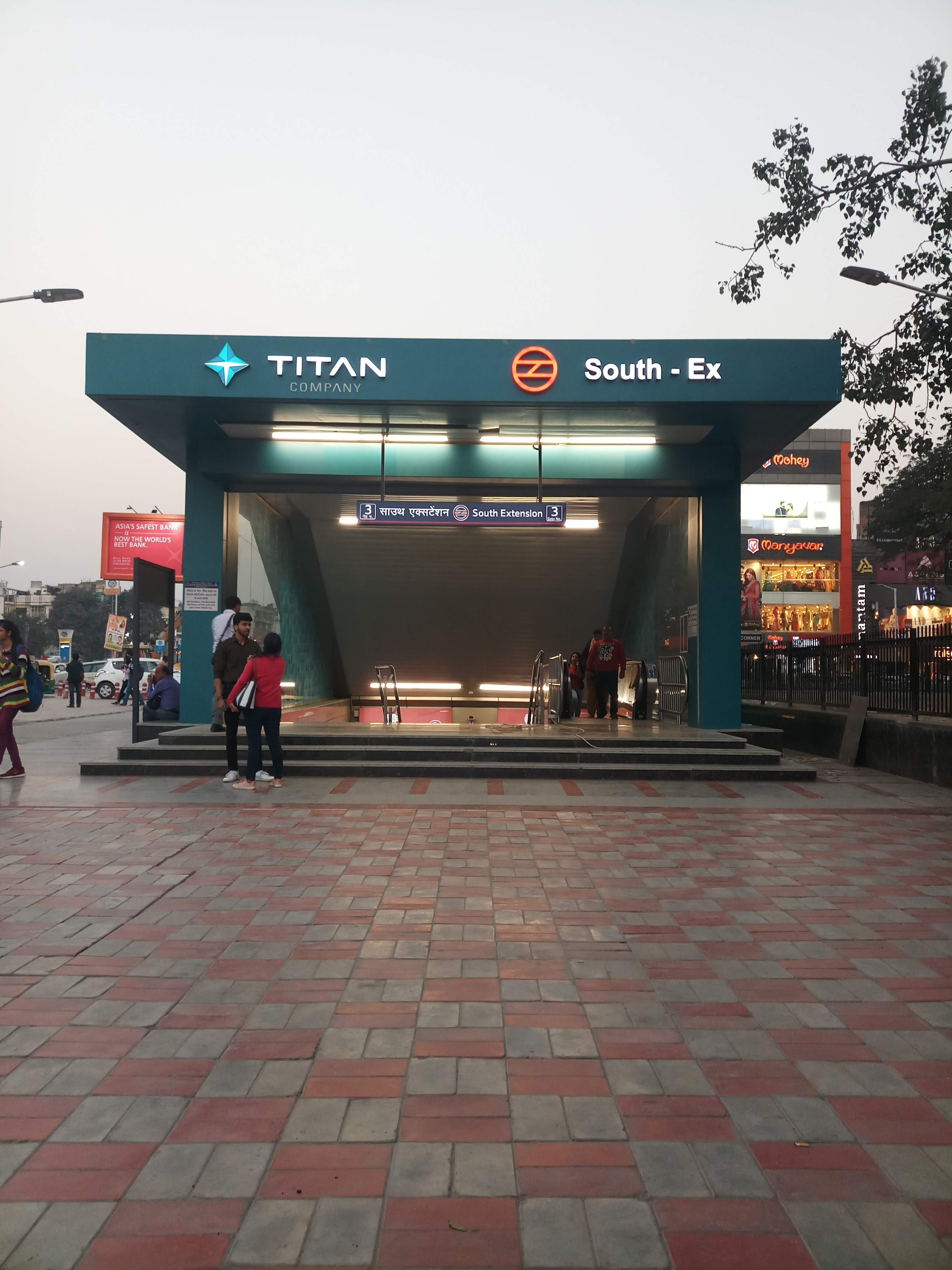

General information
- Location: Block E, South Extension II, New Delhi, Delhi 110049
- Coordinates: 28°34′07″N 77°13′13″E
- System: Delhi Metro station
- Owner: Delhi Metro
- Operator: Delhi Metro Rail Corporation (DMRC)
- Line: Pink Line
- Platforms: Island platform Platform 1 → "-" Circular Line; Platform 2 → "+" Circular Line
- Tracks: 2

Construction
- Structure type: Underground, double-track
- Depth: 20 metres (66 ft)
- Platform levels: 2
- Accessible: Yes

Other information
- Status: Staffed, Operational
- Station code: SOEN

History
- Opened: 6 August 2018; 8 years ago
- Electrified: 25 kV 50 Hz AC through overhead catenary

Services
Preceding station	Delhi Metro	Following station
Dilli Haat - INA towards Maujpur - Babarpur	Pink Line	Lajpat Nagar towards Shiv Vihar
Route map
Location

South Extension is an underground metro station on the Pink Line of the Delhi Metro, located beneath the Ring Road in South Delhi. It commenced operations on 6 August 2018 as part of the Durgabai Deshmukh South Campus–Lajpat Nagar section of the Pink Line.

The station serves both South Extension Part I and Part II, which are situated on opposite sides of the Ring Road. It provides pedestrian access to the two shopping districts through its entry and exit facilities, with the existing subway between the markets refurbished and integrated with the station.

== Station layout ==
G	Street level	Exit/Entrance
C	Concourse	Fare control, station agent, Ticket/token, shops
P	Platform 1 Anticlockwise	"-" Circular Line (Anticlockwise); Via: Lajpat Nagar, Vinobapuri, Ashram, Sarai Kale Khan - Nizamuddin, Mayur Vihar-I, Shree Ram Mandir Mayur Vihar, Trilokpuri - Sanjay Lake, IP Extension, Anand Vihar, Karkarduma, Welcome, Maujpur - Babarpur, Yamuna Vihar, Bhajanpura, Nanaksar - Sonia Vihar, Jagatpur - Wazirabad, Burari, Majlis Park, Azadpur, Shalimar Bagh, Netaji Subhash Place; Next Station: Lajpat Nagar; Change at the next station for Violet Line
P	Island platform | Doors will open on the right
P	Platform 2 Clockwise	"+" Circular Line (Clockwise); Via: Dilli Haat - INA, Sarojini Nagar, Bhikaji Cama Place, Sir M. Vishweshwaraiah Moti Bagh, Durgabai Deshmukh South Campus, Delhi Cantt., Naraina Vihar, Mayapuri, Rajouri Garden, ESI - Basaidarapur, Punjabi Bagh West, Shakurpur; Next Station: Dilli Haat - INA; Change at the next station for Yellow Line

== Entry/Exit ==
South Extension metro station Entry/exits
Gate No-1	Gate No-2	Gate No-3	Gate No-4
South Extension 1	South Extension 1	South Extension 2	South Extension 2

== Connections ==
=== Bus ===
Delhi Transport Corporation bus routes number 323, 392, 392B, 433CL, 433LnkSTL, 442, 460, 460CL, 460STL, 479, 479CL, 540, 540ACL, 540CL, 542, 543A, 544, 544A, 567, 567A, 568A, 611, 611A, 623, 623B, 623EXT, 711, 711A, 724C, 727, 874, 984A, AC-479, AC-544, AC-623, AC-711, AC-727 Anand Vihar ISBT Terminal - Gurugram Bus Stand Anand Vihar ISBT Terminal - Gurugram Bus Stand AC CS-13A, CS-13B, TMS+Punjabi Baghserves the station.

== See also ==
- Delhi
- List of Delhi Metro stations
- Transport in Delhi
- Delhi Metro Rail Corporation
- Delhi Suburban Railway
- Inner Ring Road, Delhi
- South Extension
- Delhi Monorail
- Delhi Transport Corporation
- South Delhi
- New Delhi
- National Capital Region (India)
- List of rapid transit systems
- List of metro systems
