= Pink Line (Delhi Metro) =

Line on the Delhi Metro system

Pink Line (Line 7) Pink Circular Line
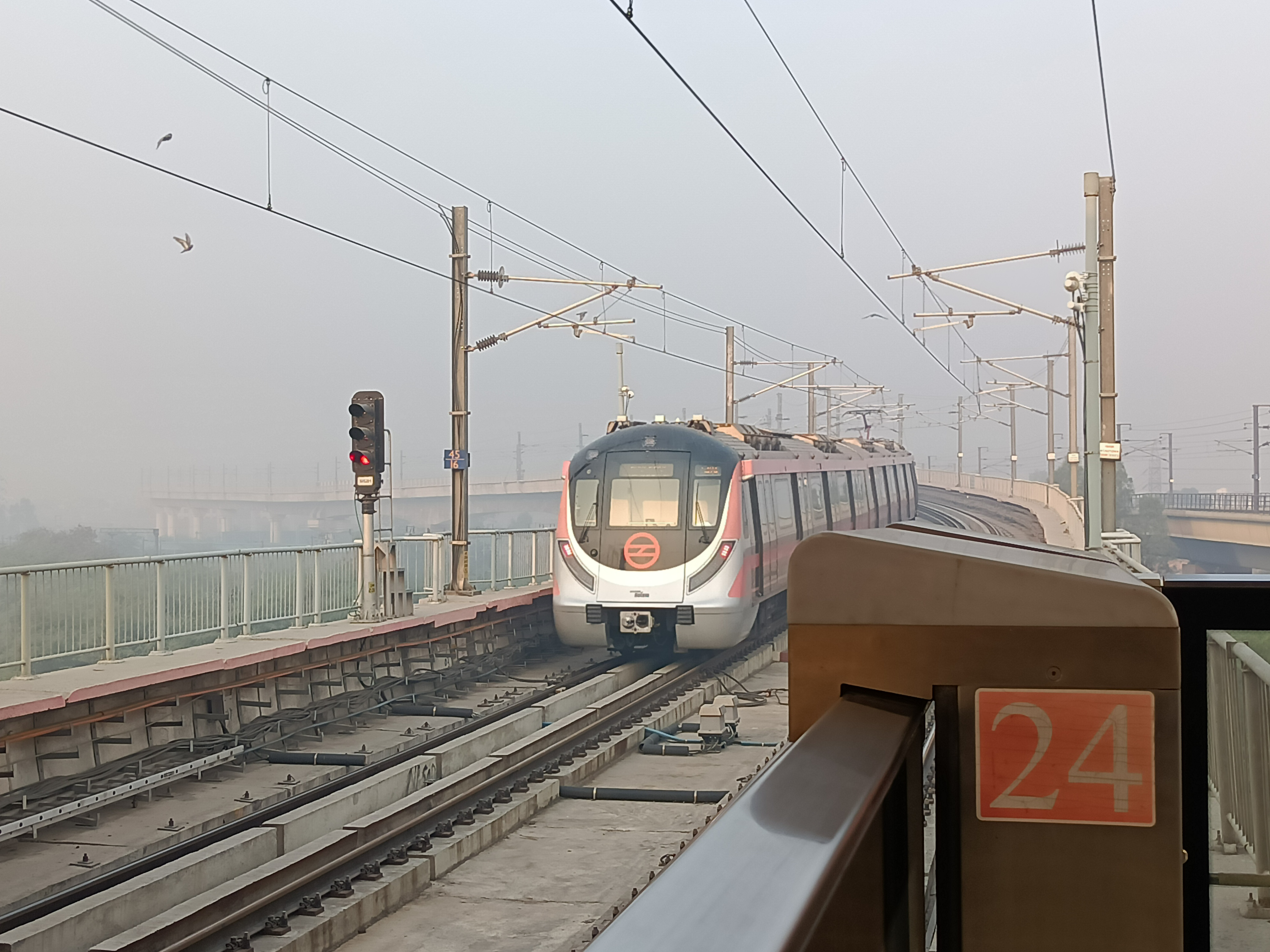
- A Hyundai Rotem train for the Pink Line near Anand Vihar Station

Overview
- Status: Operational
- Owner: Delhi Metro
- Locale: Delhi and Ghaziabad
- Termini: (Main Line): Circular Line; (Branch): Maujpur - Babarpur and Shiv Vihar
- Stations: 46

Service
- Type: Rapid Transit
- System: Delhi Metro
- Operator: Delhi Metro Rail Corporation
- Rolling stock: Hyundai-ROTEM
- Daily ridership: 621,241 (May 2026)

History
- Opened: 14 March 2018; 8 years ago
- Last extension: 8 March 2026

Technical
- Line length: 73.49 km (45.66 mi)
- Character: Underground and Elevated
- Track gauge: 1,435 mm (4 ft 8 1/2 in) standard gauge
- Electrification: 25 kV 50 Hz AC from overhead catenary

The Pink Line (Line 7) or Pink Circular Line is a line of the Delhi Metro, a rapid transit system in Delhi, India. It consists of 46 stations out of which 43 stations are on the main line (Circular line) and 3 stations on the branch line with Maujpur - Babarpur as the common interchange station for both the lines. Spanning a total length of 73.49 kilometres (45.66 mi), It is Delhi Metro's — and India's — longest metro line. The Pink Line is India's first operational ring metro. It is also informally known as the Ring Road Line, as it mostly passes alongside the city's Inner Ring Road.

The Pink Line has interchanges with most of the operational lines of the network, such as the Red Line at Netaji Subhash Place & Welcome, Yellow Line at Azadpur & Dilli Haat - INA, Green Line at Punjabi Bagh West, Blue Line at Rajouri Garden, Mayur Vihar Phase-I, Anand Vihar & Karkarduma, Dhaula Kuan of Airport Express (Orange Line) at Durgabai Deshmukh South Campus, Violet Line at Lajpat Nagar, and Magenta Line at Majlis Park. It also has connections with Hazrat Nizamuddin and Anand Vihar Terminal railway stations, Sarai Kale Khan and Anand Vihar Namo Bharat (RRTS) stations, and the ISBTs at Sarai Kale Khan and Anand Vihar.

The Pink Line has the second highest point above ground on the Delhi Metro at Dhaula Kuan with a height of 23.6 metres (77 ft), passing over the Dhaula Kuan grade separator flyovers and the Airport Express Line. It possesses the country's smallest metro station, Ashram, with a size of just 151.6 metres (497 ft) against the usual 265 metres (869 ft). The usual platform length for a six-coach train on this route is 140 metres (459 ft) but it has been reduced to 135 metres (443 ft) in Ashram station.

The service operating on the ring in the clockwise direction is also known as Circular Line(+) while the service in the anti-clockwise direction is also known as Circular Line(-). The branch line to Shiv Vihar has separate services; passengers have to change platforms at Maujpur - Babarpur to continue on the main route. Unlike the Blue Line, it does not have a designated line number assigned. Stations on the circular line mention the service name as Circular Line(+) or (-), via the next station in the moving direction. Eg.: In Rajouri Garden metro station, the train on Circular Line(-) goes via Mayapuri.

Currently, only the Hyundai Rotem trains ply on the whole route. All new Alstom Metropolis trains have arrived at the Mukundpur Depot and have not been deployed fully in service although as of September 2026 some of them were spotted in normal operation especially on the Maujpur - Shiv Vihar branch.

== History ==
The line was initially put on table as a metro route that would run almost along the Delhi's busy Ring Road, on the lines of the existing Delhi Circular Railway. A route length of 59.24 kilometres (36.81 mi) was proposed from Majlis Park to Shiv Vihar, that would cut through all the existing lines at various interchanges as part of Phase 3's expansion plans.

Currently, there are 46 stations in the Pink Line, out of which 34 are elevated and 12 are underground.

The Pink Line was opened in several stages between 2018 and 2026. The first section, between Majlis Park and Durgabai Deshmukh South Campus, became operational on 14 March 2018. It was extended to Lajpat Nagar on 6 August 2018. A separate section between Shiv Vihar and Trilokpuri-Sanjay Lake opened on 31 October 2018, followed by the Lajpat Nagar–Mayur Vihar Pocket-I section on 31 December 2018. The remaining 1.5 km gap between Mayur Vihar Pocket-I and Trilokpuri-Sanjay Lake was completed on 6 August 2021, connecting the two previously separate sections into a continuous corridor.

The section between Trilokpuri - Sanjay Lake and Shree Ram Mandir Mayur Vihar was not completed as construction of a 1.5 km (0.93 mi) viaduct began late due to land acquisition issues at Trilokpuri. This had rendered the Pink Line into two independent lines and forced DMRC to convert the Shree Ram Mandir Mayur Vihar (formerly known as Mayur Vihar Pocket-1) station into a terminating station with reversal facilities so that trains from Majlis Park would terminate there. On the eastern section, trains would run in separate loops - Shiv Vihar to Maujpur - Babarpur and Maujpur - Babarpur to IP Extension/Trilokpuri - Sanjay Lake. Every third train from Maujpur - Babarpur would move beyond IP Extension to Trilokpuri - Sanjay Lake as the latter has no reversal facilities and single line movement took place in that section. Both disjoint sections were finally bridged on 6 August 2021.

In December 2024, trial runs were initiated on the Phase 4 extension from Majlis Park to Jagatpur Village stations which were gradually done till Sonia Vihar, and, finally, Maujpur - Babarpur, by August 2025. The Majlis Park to Maujpur - Babarpur stretch was opened on 8 March 2026, making this line India’s first ring metro line. The Soorghat station remains unopened due to delays in the construction of its entry and exit facilities, which are planned to be integrated with a Public Works Department (PWD) subway. Although the station infrastructure has been built, trains pass through without stopping.

== Stations ==
The stations of the Pink Line are:

Pink Line
#	Station Name		Phase	Opening	Interchange	Station Layout	Platform Layout
#	English	Hindi	Phase	Opening	Interchange	Station Layout	Platform Layout
1	Maujpur - Babarpur	मौजपुर - बाबरपुर	IV	8 March 2026	Pink Line	Elevated	Side
2	Yamuna Vihar	यमुना विहार	IV	8 March 2026	None	Elevated	Side
3	Bhajanpura	भजनपुरा	IV	8 March 2026	None	Elevated	Side
4	Khajuri Khas	खजूरी ख़ास	IV	8 March 2026	None	Elevated	Side
5	Nanaksar - Sonia Vihar	नानकसर - सोनिया विहार	IV	8 March 2026	None	Elevated	Side
6	Soorghat	सूरघाट	IV	Under-Construction	None	Elevated	Side
7	Jagatpur - Wazirabad	जगतपुर - वज़ीराबाद	IV	8 March 2026	None	Elevated	Side
8	Jharoda Majra	झड़ौदा माजरा	IV	8 March 2026	None	Elevated	Side
9	Burari	बुराड़ी	IV	8 March 2026	None	Elevated	Side
10	Majlis Park	मजलिस पार्क	III	14 March 2018	Magenta Line	Elevated	Side
11	Azadpur	आज़ादपुर	III	14 March 2018	Yellow Line; Magenta Line (Phase IV - Under Construction)	Underground	Island
12	Shalimar Bagh	शालीमार बाग़	III	14 March 2018	None	Underground	Island
13	Netaji Subhash Place	नेताजी सुभाष प्लेस	III	14 March 2018	Red Line	Underground	Side
14	Shakurpur	शकूरपुर	III	14 March 2018	None	Elevated	Island
15	Punjabi Bagh West	पंजाबी बाग़ पश्चिम	III	14 March 2018	Green Line	Elevated	Side
16	ESI - Basaidarapur	ईएसआई - बसईदारापुर	III	14 March 2018	None	Elevated	Side
17	Rajouri Garden	राजौरी गार्डन	III	14 March 2018	Blue Line	Elevated	Side
18	Mayapuri	मायापुरी	III	14 March 2018	None	Elevated	Side
19	Naraina Vihar	नारायणा विहार	III	14 March 2018	None	Underground	Island
20	Delhi Cantt.	दिल्ली कैन्ट.	III	14 March 2018	None	Elevated	Side
21	Durgabai Deshmukh South Campus	दुर्गाबाई देशमुख साउथ कैम्पस	III	14 March 2018	Airport Express	Elevated	Side
22	Sir M. Vishweshwaraiah Moti Bagh	सर एम. विश्वेश्वरय्या मोती बाग	III	6 August 2018	None	Elevated	Side
23	Bhikaji Cama Place	भीकाजी कामा प्लेस	III	6 August 2018	None	Underground	Island
24	Sarojini Nagar	सरोजिनी नगर	III	6 August 2018	None	Underground	Island
25	Dilli Haat - INA	दिल्ली हाट - आईएनए	III	6 August 2018	Yellow Line	Underground	Island
26	South Extension	साउथ एक्सटेंशन	III	6 August 2018	None	Underground	Island
27	Lajpat Nagar	लाजपत नगर	III	6 August 2018	Violet Line; Golden Line (Phase IV - Under Construction)	Underground	Island
28	Vinobapuri	विनोबापुरी	III	31 December 2018	None	Underground	Island
29	Ashram	आश्रम	III	31 December 2018	None	Underground	Island
30	Sarai Kale Khan - Nizamuddin	सराय काले ख़ान - निज़ामुद्दीन	III	31 December 2018	Sarai Kale Khan; Hazrat Nizamuddin; Sarai Kale Khan ISBT	Underground	Island
31	Mayur Vihar-I	मयूर विहार-I	III	31 December 2018	Blue Line	Elevated	Side
32	Shree Ram Mandir Mayur Vihar	श्री राम मंदिर मयूर विहार	III	31 December 2018	None	Elevated	Side
33	Trilokpuri - Sanjay Lake	त्रिलोकपुरी–संजय लेक	III	31 December 2018	None	Elevated	Side
34	East Vinod Nagar - Mayur Vihar II	ईस्ट विनोद नगर–मयूर विहार-II	III	31 December 2018	None	Elevated	Side
35	Mandawali - West Vinod Nagar	मण्डावली - वेस्ट विनोद नगर	III	31 December 2018	None	Elevated	Side
36	IP Extension	इन्द्रप्रस्थ एक्सटेंशन	III	31 December 2018	None	Elevated	Side
37	Anand Vihar	आनंद विहार	III	31 December 2018	Blue Line; Anand Vihar; Anand Vihar Terminal; Anand Vihar ISBT	Elevated	Side
38	Karkarduma	कड़कड़डूमा	III	31 December 2018	Blue Line	Elevated	Side
39	Karkarduma Court	कड़कड़डूमा कोर्ट	III	31 December 2018	None	Elevated	Side
40	Krishna Nagar	कृष्णा नगर	III	31 December 2018	None	Elevated	Side
41	East Azad Nagar	ईस्ट आज़ाद नगर	III	31 December 2018	None	Elevated	Side
42	Welcome	वेलकम	III	31 December 2018	Red Line	Elevated	Side
43	Jaffrabad	जाफ़राबाद	III	31 December 2018	None	Elevated	Side
44	Maujpur - Babarpur	मौजपुर–बाबरपुर	III	31 December 2018	Pink Line	Elevated	Side

Pink Line (Branch)
#	Station Name		Phase	Opening	Interchange	Station Layout	Platform Layout
#	English	Hindi	Phase	Opening	Interchange	Station Layout	Platform Layout
1	Maujpur - Babarpur	मौजपुर–बाबरपुर	III	31 October 2018	Pink Line	Elevated	Side
2	Gokulpuri	गोकुलपुरी	III	31 October 2018	None	Elevated	Side
3	Johri Enclave	जोहरी एन्क्लेव	III	31 October 2018	None	Elevated	Side
4	Shiv Vihar	शिव विहार	III	31 October 2018	None	Elevated	Side

== Train Info ==
Pink Line
Rakes	Hyundai Rotem RS-10	Alstom Metropolis RS-17
Train Gauge	1,435 mm (4 ft 8 1/2 in) standard gauge	
Electrification	25 kV 50 Hz AC (nominal) from overhead catenary	
Train's Maximum Speed	100 km/h	
Train Operation	Circular Line(+) & (-) Maujpur - Babarpur ⇄ Shiv Vihar	

== Planned extension ==
Gokulpuri-Hindon Airport-Arthala Pink Line Extension: In September 2024, the DMRC proposed a branch of 13 km from Trans-Yamuna North-East Delhi (existing Gokulpuri metro station of Pink Line) to the west Ghaziabad (existing Arthala metro station of Red Line) via Hindon Airport connecting 2 existing Red Line metro stations with 10 new Pink Line stations namely Gol Chakkar, DLF, Shalimar Garden, Hindon Airport, Bhopura, Tulsi Niketan, Rajendra Nagar, New Karhaira Colony, Karhaira, and Loni Road Industrial Area. It is also officially proposed in delhi metro phase 5 corridors, among the 4 metro corridors of phase 5 in ghaziabad.

== See also ==
- List of Delhi Metro stations
- Transport in Delhi
- Delhi Metro Rail Corporation
- Delhi Suburban Railway
