= Sarojini Nagar metro station =

Metro station in Delhi, India

Sarojini Nagar

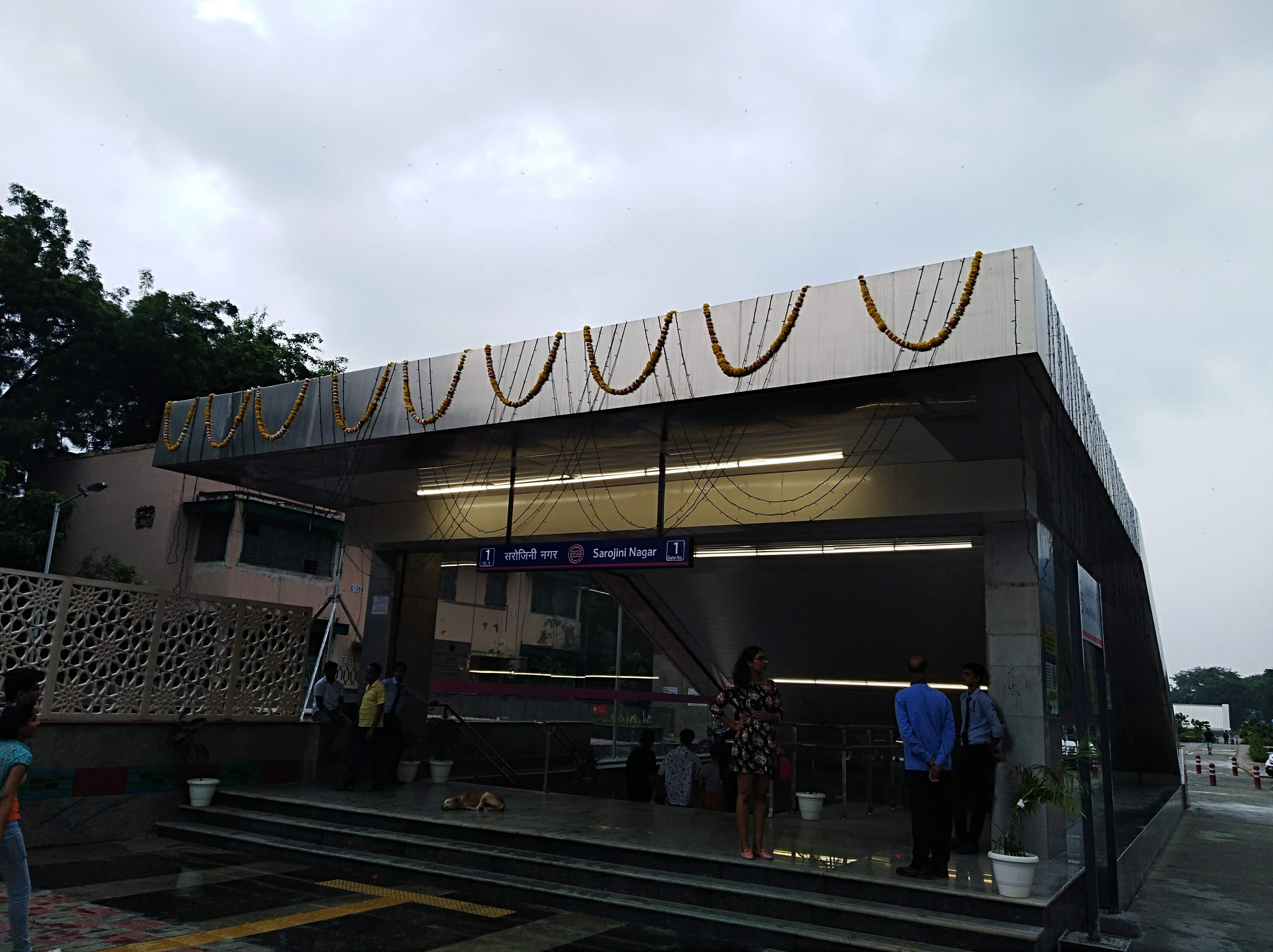

General information
- Location: Block C, Sarojini Nagar, New Delhi, Delhi 110023
- Coordinates: 28°34′33″N 77°11′55″E
- System: Delhi Metro station
- Owner: Delhi Metro
- Operator: Delhi Metro Rail Corporation (DMRC)
- Line: Pink Line
- Platforms: Island platform Platform 1 → "-" Circular Line; Platform 2 → "+" Circular Line
- Tracks: 2

Construction
- Structure type: Underground, double-track
- Platform levels: 2
- Accessible: Yes

Other information
- Status: Staffed, Operational
- Station code: SOJI

History
- Opened: 6 August 2018; 8 years ago
- Electrified: 25 kV 50 Hz AC through overhead catenary

Services
Preceding station	Delhi Metro	Following station
Bhikaji Cama Place towards Maujpur - Babarpur	Pink Line	Dilli Haat - INA towards Shiv Vihar
Route map
Location

The Sarojini Nagar metro station is a station located on the Pink Line of the Delhi Metro. The station was opened on 6 August 2018.

== Station layout ==
G	Street level	Exit/Entrance
C	Concourse	Fare control, station agent, Ticket/token, shops
P	Platform 1 Anticlockwise	"-" Circular Line (Anticlockwise); Via: Dilli Haat - INA, South Extension, Lajpat Nagar, Vinobapuri, Ashram, Sarai Kale Khan - Nizamuddin, Mayur Vihar-I, Shree Ram Mandir Mayur Vihar, Trilokpuri - Sanjay Lake, IP Extension, Anand Vihar, Karkarduma, Welcome, Maujpur - Babarpur, Yamuna Vihar, Bhajanpura, Nanaksar - Sonia Vihar, Jagatpur - Wazirabad, Burari, Majlis Park, Azadpur; Next Station: Dilli Haat - INA; Change at the next station for Yellow Line
P	Island platform | Doors will open on the right
P	Platform 2 Clockwise	"+" Circular Line (Clockwise); Via: Bhikaji Cama Place, Sir M. Vishweshwaraiah Moti Bagh, Durgabai Deshmukh South Campus, Delhi Cantt., Naraina Vihar, Mayapuri, Rajouri Garden, ESI - Basaidarapur, Punjabi Bagh West, Shakurpur, Netaji Subhash Place, Shalimar Bagh; Next Station: Bhikaji Cama Place

== Entry/Exit ==
Sarojini Nagar metro station Entry/exits
Gate No-1	Gate No-2
Sarojini Nagar Market	Pilanji Gaon

== Connections ==
=== Bus ===
Delhi Transport Corporation bus routes number 536, 544, 544A, AC-544, serve the station from Sarojini Nagar Police Station bus stop.

== See also ==
- Delhi
- List of Delhi Metro stations
- Transport in Delhi
- Delhi Metro Rail Corporation
- Delhi Suburban Railway
- Inner Ring Road, Delhi
- Sarojini Nagar
- Delhi Monorail
- Delhi Transport Corporation
- South Delhi
- New Delhi
- National Capital Region (India)
- List of rapid transit systems
- List of metro systems
