= Sir M. Vishweshwaraiah Moti Bagh metro station =

Metro station in Delhi, India

Sir M. Vishweshwaraiah Moti Bagh

General information
- Location: Rao Tula Ram Marg, Block A, South Moti Bagh, New Delhi,110021
- Coordinates: 28°34′43″N 77°10′33″E
- System: Delhi Metro station
- Owner: Delhi Metro
- Operator: Delhi Metro Rail Corporation (DMRC)
- Line: Pink Line
- Platforms: Side platform Platform 1 → "-" Circular Line; Platform 2 → "+" Circular Line
- Tracks: 2

Construction
- Structure type: Elevated, double-track
- Platform levels: 2
- Accessible: Yes

Other information
- Status: Staffed, Operational
- Station code: SVMB

History
- Opened: 6 August 2018; 8 years ago
- Electrified: 25 kV 50 Hz AC through overhead catenary

Services
Preceding station	Delhi Metro	Following station
Durgabai Deshmukh South Campus towards Maujpur - Babarpur	Pink Line	Bhikaji Cama Place towards Shiv Vihar
Route map
Location

The Sir M. Vishweshwaraiah Moti Bagh metro station is located on the Pink Line of the Delhi Metro. The station was opened on 6 August 2018. Moti Bagh metro is situated on the Ring Road.

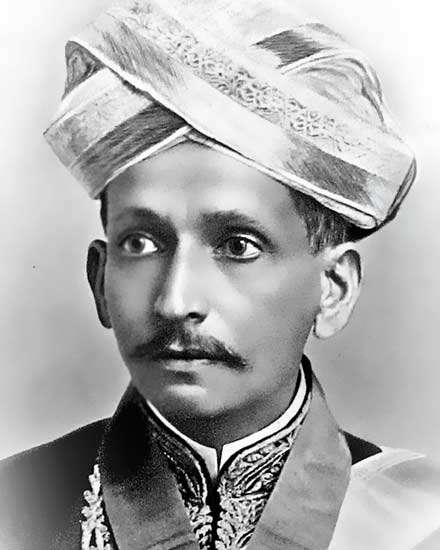
Sir Vishweshwariah, after whom the station is named

== Station layout ==
L2	Side platform | Doors will open on the left
L2	Platform 1 Anticlockwise	"-" Circular Line (Anticlockwise); Via: Bhikaji Cama Place, Sarojini Nagar, Dilli Haat - INA, South Extension, Lajpat Nagar, Sarai Kale Khan - Nizamuddin, Mayur Vihar-I, Shree Ram Mandir Mayur Vihar, Trilokpuri - Sanjay Lake, IP Extension, Anand Vihar, Karkarduma, Welcome, Maujpur - Babarpur, Yamuna Vihar, Bhajanpura, Nanaksar - Sonia Vihar, Jagatpur - Wazirabad, Burari; Next Station: Bhikaji Cama Place
L2	Platform 2 Clockwise	"+" Circular Line (Clockwise); Via: Durgabai Deshmukh South Campus, Delhi Cantt., Naraina Vihar, Mayapuri, Rajouri Garden, ESI - Basaidarapur, Punjabi Bagh West, Shakurpur, Netaji Subhash Place, Shalimar Bagh, Azadpur, Majlis Park; Next Station: Durgabai Deshmukh South Campus; Change at the next station for connecting to Dhaula Kuan under Airport Express
L2	Side platform | Doors will open on the left
L1	Concourse	Fare control, station agent, Metro Card vending machines, crossover
G	Street level	Exit/Entrance

== Entry/Exit ==
Sir M. Vishweshwaraiah Moti Bagh metro station Entry/exits
Gate No-1	Gate No-2
Sector-12 R.K. Puram	South Moti Bagh
Sector-9 R.K. Puram	Shanti Niketan
K.D. Colony	
North Moti Bagh	
Aradhana Enclave	

== Connections ==
=== Bus ===
Delhi Transport Corporation and Delhi Transit (Cluster Buses) provides service to bus routes number 392, 392B, 398, 448EXT, 479, 479CL, 529SPL, 543A, 567, 567A, 568, 568A, 569, 588, 611A, 711, 724, 724C, 724EXT, 780, 794, 794A, 864, 874, 984A, AC-479, AC-711, AC-724, AC-724A, TMS (-), TMS-Azadpur-Lajpat, TMS-LajpatNagar, TMS-PBagh serves the station from nearby North Moti Bagh bus stop.

== See also ==
- Delhi
- List of Delhi Metro stations
- Transport in Delhi
- Delhi Metro Rail Corporation
- Delhi Suburban Railway
- Inner Ring Road, Delhi
- South Extension
- Delhi Monorail
- Delhi Transport Corporation
- South Delhi
- New Delhi
- National Capital Region (India)
- List of rapid transit systems
- List of metro systems
