= Durgabai Deshmukh South Campus metro station =

Delhi Metro station on pink line

Durgabai Deshmukh South Campus

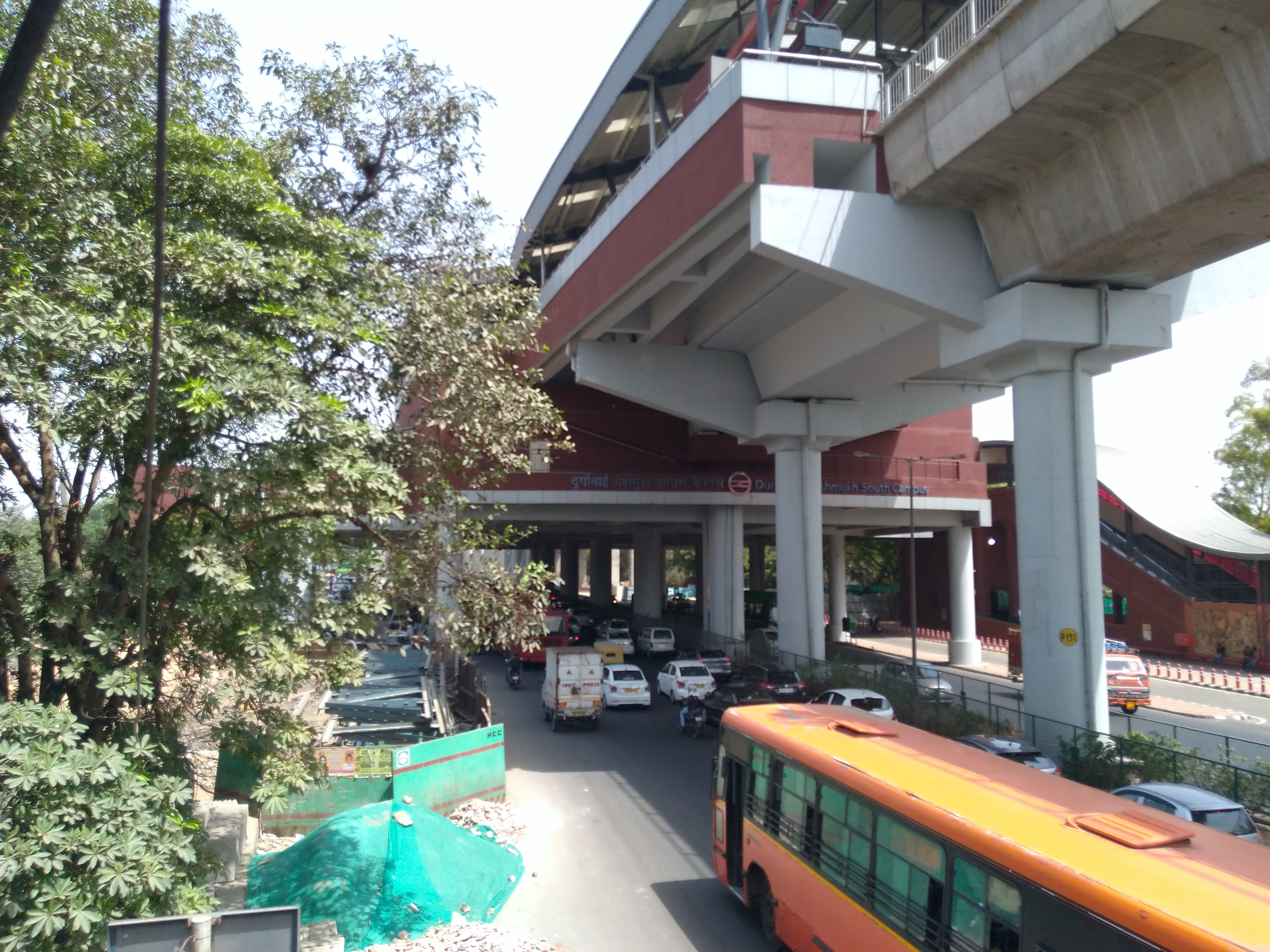

General information
- Location: Moti Bagh, New Delhi
- Coordinates: 28°35′22″N 77°10′10″E
- System: Delhi Metro station
- Owner: Delhi Metro
- Line: Pink Line
- Platforms: Side platform; Platform 1 → "-" Circular Line; Platform 2 → "+" Circular Line
- Tracks: 2
- Connections: Airport Express Dhaula Kuan

Construction
- Structure type: Elevated, Double-track
- Parking: No
- Cycle facilities: No
- Accessible: Yes

Other information
- Station code: DDSC

History
- Opened: 14 March 2018; 8 years ago
- Electrified: 25 kV 50 Hz AC through overhead catenary

Services
Preceding station	Delhi Metro	Following station
Delhi Cantonment towards Maujpur - Babarpur	Pink Line	Sir M. Vishweshwaraiah Moti Bagh towards Shiv Vihar
Delhi Aerocity towards Yashobhoomi Dwarka Sector - 25	Airport Express transfer at Dhaula Kuan	Shivaji Stadium towards New Delhi
Route map
Location

Durgabai Deshmukh South Campus is an elevated metro station on the Pink Line of the Delhi Metro, constructed as part of Phase III of the network's expansion. During the planning stage, the station was known as South Campus. In December 2014, the Delhi government announced that it would be renamed Durgabai Deshmukh South Campus, in honour of freedom fighter, social worker and educationist Durgabai Deshmukh.

An interchange connection is available with Dhaula Kuan station on the Airport Express Line through a 1.2 km (0.75 mi) long foot overbridge (FOB), which opened to the public on 9 February 2019. The skywalk is equipped with 22 travelators to facilitate passenger movement between the two stations.

Located on Ring Road, near the junction with Benito Juarez Marg, the station provides metro connectivity to Delhi University's South Campus and several nearby colleges, including Sri Venkateswara College, Maitreyi College and Jesus and Mary College.

== Station layout ==
L2	Side platform | Doors will open on the left
L2	Platform 1 Anticlockwise	"-" Circular Line (Anticlockwise); Via: Sir M. Vishweshwaraiah Moti Bagh, Bhikaji Cama Place, Sarojini Nagar, Dilli Haat - INA, South Extension, Lajpat Nagar, Sarai Kale Khan - Nizamuddin, Mayur Vihar-I, Shree Ram Mandir Mayur Vihar, Trilokpuri - Sanjay Lake, IP Extension, Anand Vihar, Karkarduma, Welcome, Maujpur - Babarpur, Yamuna Vihar, Bhajanpura, Nanaksar - Sonia Vihar; Next Station: Sir M. Vishweshwaraiah Moti Bagh
L2	Platform 2 Clockwise	"+" Circular Line (Clockwise); Via: Delhi Cantt., Naraina Vihar, Mayapuri, Rajouri Garden, ESI - Basaidarapur, Punjabi Bagh West, Shakurpur, Netaji Subhash Place, Shalimar Bagh, Azadpur, Majlis Park, Burari, Jagatpur - Wazirabad; Next Station: Delhi Cantonment
L2	Side platform | Doors will open on the left
L1	Concourse	Fare control, station agent, Metro Card vending machines, crossover
G	Street level	Exit/Entrance

== Entry/Exit ==
Durgabai Deshmukh South Campus metro station Entry/exits
Gate No-1	Gate No-2
1. Sri Venkateswar College; 2. Satya Niketan	1. Northern Railway Eco Park; 2. Smriti Vatika; 3. San Martin Park

== See also ==
- Delhi
- List of Delhi Metro stations
- Transport in Delhi
- Delhi Metro Rail Corporation
- Delhi Suburban Railway
- Inner Ring Road, Delhi
- South Extension
- Delhi Monorail
- Delhi Transport Corporation
- South Delhi
- New Delhi
- National Capital Region (India)
- List of rapid transit systems
- List of metro systems
