= IP Extension metro station =

Metro station in Delhi, India

IP Extension

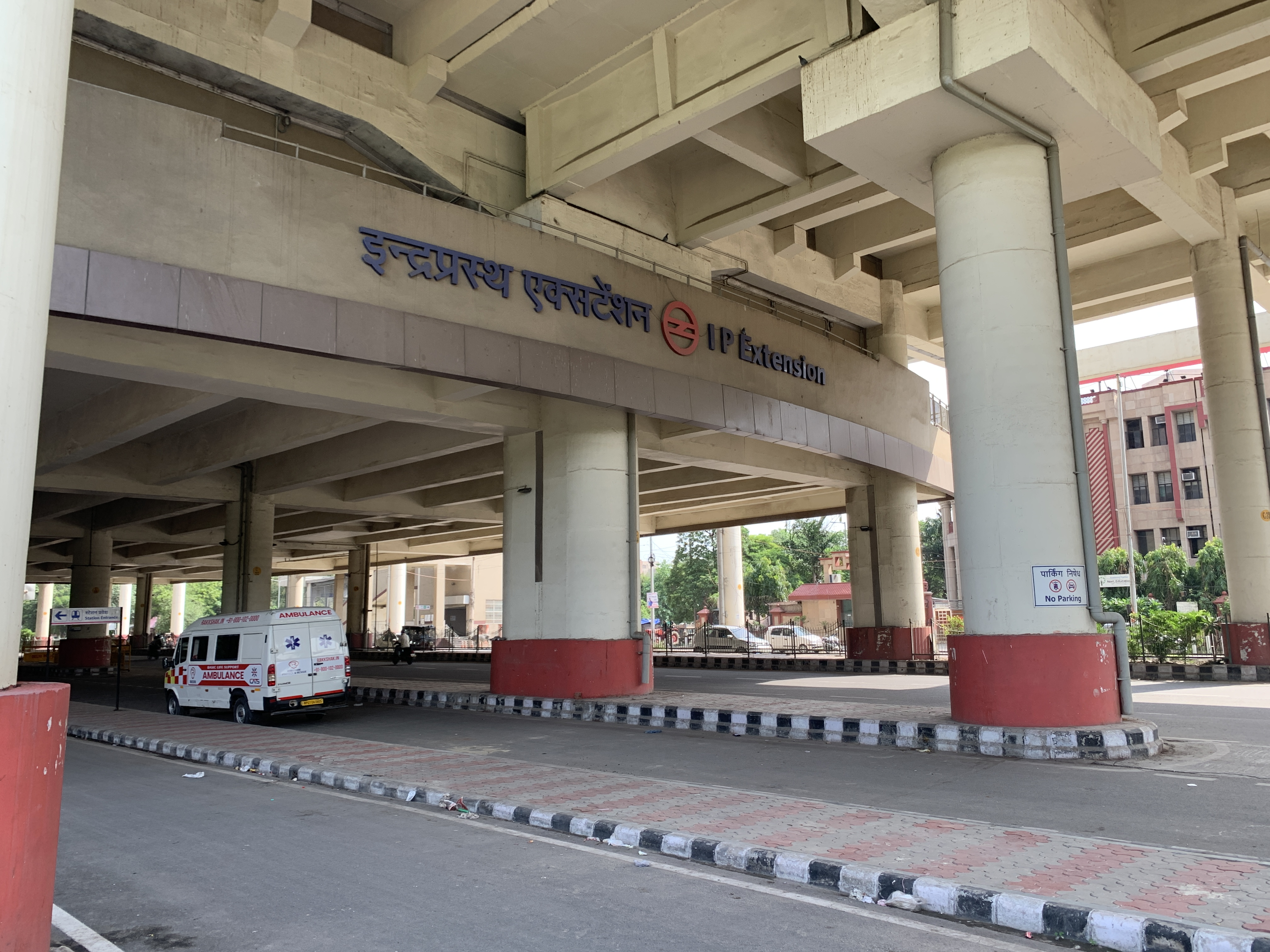

General information
- Location: IP Extension, Delhi, 110092
- Coordinates: 28°37′55″N 77°18′39″E
- System: Delhi Metro station
- Owner: Delhi Metro
- Operator: Delhi Metro Rail Corporation (DMRC)
- Line: Pink Line
- Platforms: Side Platform; Platform 1 → "-" Circular Line; Platform 2 → "+" Circular Line; Platform 3 → Train terminates
- Tracks: 3

Construction
- Structure type: Elevated, Double-track
- Platform levels: 2
- Accessible: Yes

Other information
- Status: Staffed, Operational
- Station code: IPE

History
- Opened: 31 October 2018; 7 years ago
- Electrified: 25 kV 50 Hz AC through overhead catenary

Services
Preceding station	Delhi Metro	Following station
Mandawali - West Vinod Nagar towards Maujpur - Babarpur	Pink Line	Anand Vihar towards Shiv Vihar
Route map
Location

Indraprastha Extension (or IP Extension) is a metro station located on the Pink Line of the Delhi Metro. As a part of Delhi Metro's Phase III, the station became operational on 31 October 2018.

== Station layout ==
L2	Side platform | Doors will open on the left
L2	Platform 1 Anticlockwise	"-" Circular Line (Anticlockwise); Via: Anand Vihar, Karkarduma, Krishna Nagar, East Azad Nagar, Welcome, Jaffrabad, Maujpur - Babarpur, Yamuna Vihar, Bhajanpura, Nanaksar - Sonia Vihar, Jagatpur - Wazirabad, Burari, Majlis Park, Azadpur, Shalimar Bagh, Netaji Subhash Place, Punjabi Bagh West, Rajouri Garden, Mayapuri, Naraina Vihar; Next Station: Anand Vihar; Change at the next station for Blue Line
L2	Platform 2 Clockwise	"+" Circular Line (Clockwise); Via: Mandawali - West Vinod Nagar, East Vinod Nagar - Mayur Vihar-II, Trilokpuri - Sanjay Lake, Shree Ram Mandir Mayur Vihar, Mayur Vihar-I, Sarai Kale Khan - Nizamuddin, Lajpat Nagar, South Extension, Dilli Haat - INA, Sarojini Nagar, Sir M. Vishweshwaraiah Moti Bagh, Durgabai Deshmukh South Campus, Delhi Cantt. Next Station: Mandawali - West Vinod Nagar
L2	Side platform | Doors will open on the left
L1	Concourse	Fare control, station agent, Metro Card vending machines, crossover
G	Street Level	Exit/Entrance

== Exits ==
IP Extension station Entry/exits
Gate No-1	Gate No-2

== Connections ==
This station is directly connected to Vinod Nagar Depot by elevated feeder lines passing over Delhi Meerut Expressway.

== See also ==
- Delhi
- List of Delhi Metro stations
- Transport in Delhi
- Delhi Metro Rail Corporation
- Delhi Suburban Railway
- Delhi Monorail
- Sanjay Lake
- Mayur Vihar
- Delhi Transport Corporation
- East Delhi
- New Delhi
- National Capital Region (India)
- List of rapid transit systems
- List of metro systems
