= Azadpur metro station =

Metro station in Delhi, India

Azadpur

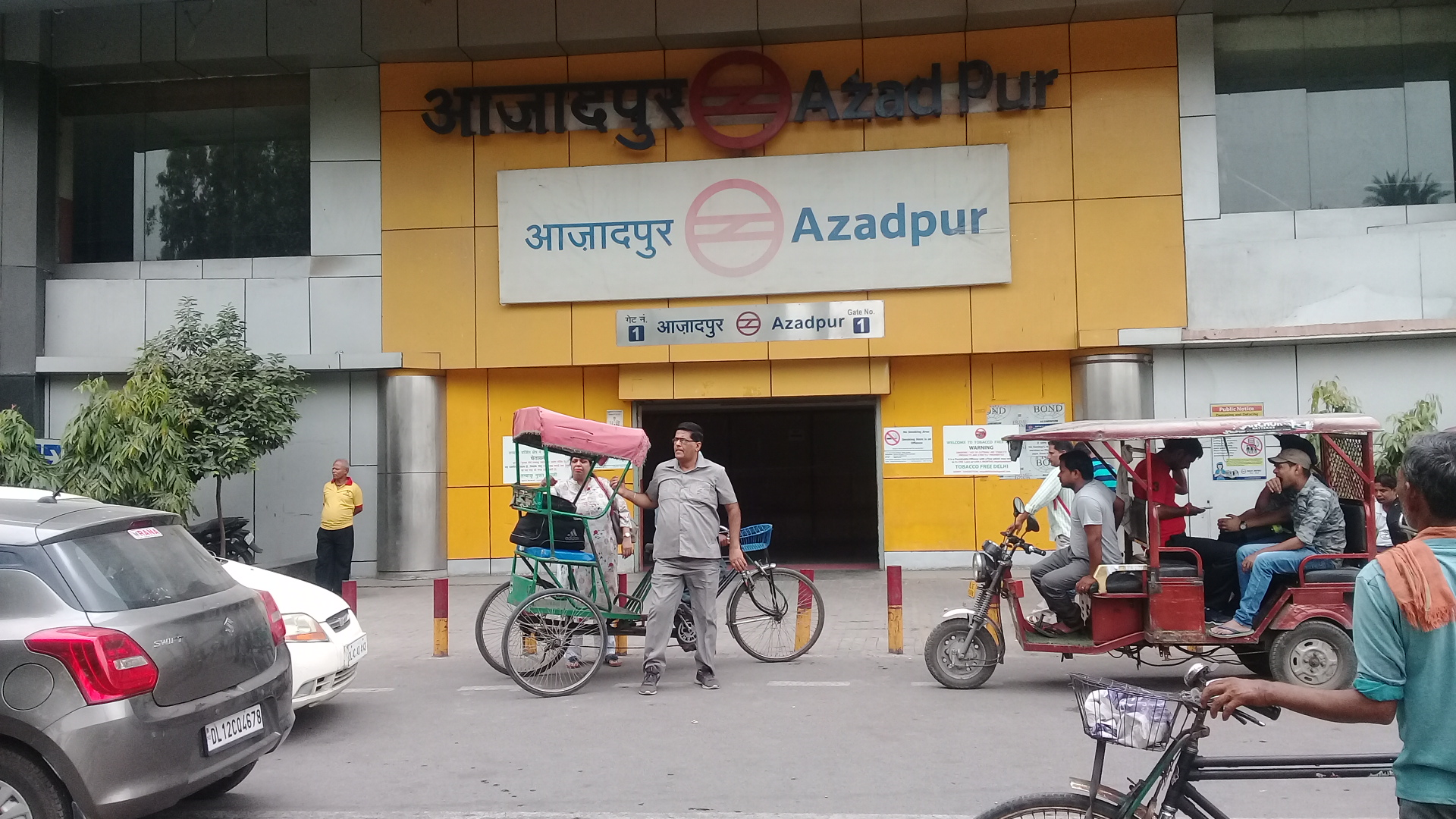

General information
- Location: Karnal Rd, Azadpur, New Delhi, 110033; India
- Coordinates: 28°42′26″N 77°10′48″E
- System: Delhi Metro station
- Owner: Delhi Metro
- Line: Yellow Line Pink Line Magenta Line
- Platforms: Side platform Yellow Line; Platform 1 → Millennium City Centre Gurugram; Platform 2 → Samaypur Badli; Island platform Pink Line; Platform 3 → "-" Circular Line; Platform 4 → "+" Circular Line
- Tracks: 4

Construction
- Structure type: Yellow Line - Elevated; Pink Line - Underground
- Platform levels: 2
- Parking: Available
- Accessible: Yes

Other information
- Station code: AZU

History
- Opened: 4 February 2004; 22 years ago Yellow Line; 14 March 2018; 8 years ago Pink Line
- Electrified: 25 kV 50 Hz AC through overhead catenary

Passengers
- Jan 2015: 382,149; 12,327 Daily Average

Services
Preceding station	Delhi Metro	Following station
Adarsh Nagar towards Samaypur Badli	Yellow Line	Model Town towards Millennium City Centre Gurugram
Majlis Park towards Maujpur - Babarpur	Pink Line	Shalimar Bagh towards Shiv Vihar
Future service
Ashok Vihar towards Ramakrishna Ashram Marg	Magenta Line	Majlis Park towards Botanical Garden
Route map
Location

Azadpur is an interchange metro station serving the Yellow Line and Pink Line of the Delhi Metro. The station serves Azadpur and other adjoining areas in North Delhi, including Model Town, Adarsh Nagar, Guru Tegh Bahadur Nagar, Jahangirpuri, Shalimar Bagh and Ashok Vihar. It also provides connectivity to the Delhi Transport Corporation (DTC) Azadpur Bus Terminal.

Under Phase IV of the Delhi Metro, a new station serving the Magenta Line is being constructed at Azadpur as part of the Janakpuri West–Ramakrishna Ashram Marg corridor. Once operational, it will connect the Yellow, Pink and Magenta lines, making Azadpur a triple-interchange station alongside Kashmere Gate, which currently connects three metro lines.

== Station layout ==
L2	Side platform | Doors will open on the left
L2	Platform 1 Southbound	Towards → Millennium City Centre Gurugram; Next Station: Model Town
L2	Platform 2 Northbound	Towards ← Samaypur Badli; Next Station: Adarsh Nagar
L2	Side platform | Doors will open on the left
L1	Concourse	Fare control, station agent, Metro Card vending machines, crossover
G	Street level	Exit/Entrance

C	Concourse	Fare control, station agent, Ticket/token, shops
P	Platform 3 Eastbound	"-" Circular Line (Anticlockwise); Via: Shalimar Bagh, Netaji Subhash Place, Shakurpur, Punjabi Bagh West, ESI - Basaidarapur, Rajouri Garden, Mayapuri, Naraina Vihar, Delhi Cantonment, Durgabai Deshmukh South Campus, Sir M. Vishweshwaraiah Moti Bagh, Sarojini Nagar, Dilli Haat - INA, South Extension, Lajpat Nagar, Sarai Kale Khan - Nizamuddin, Mayur Vihar-I, Shree Ram Mandir Mayur Vihar; Next Station: Shalimar Bagh
P	Island platform | Doors will open on the right
P	Platform 4 Clockwise	"+" Circular Line (Clockwise); Via: Majlis Park, Burari, Jagatpur - Wazirabad, Nanaksar - Sonia Vihar, Bhajanpura, Yamuna Vihar, Maujpur - Babarpur, Welcome, Karkarduma, Anand Vihar, IP Extension, Trilokpuri - Sanjay Lake; Next Station: Majlis Park; Change at the next station for Magenta Line

Artwork at Azadpur metro station

== See also ==
- List of Delhi Metro stations
- Transport in Delhi
- Delhi Metro Rail Corporation
- Delhi Suburban Railway
- Delhi Transport Corporation
- North Delhi
- National Capital Region (India)
- List of rapid transit systems
- List of metro systems
