= Welcome metro station =

Metro station in Delhi, India

Welcome

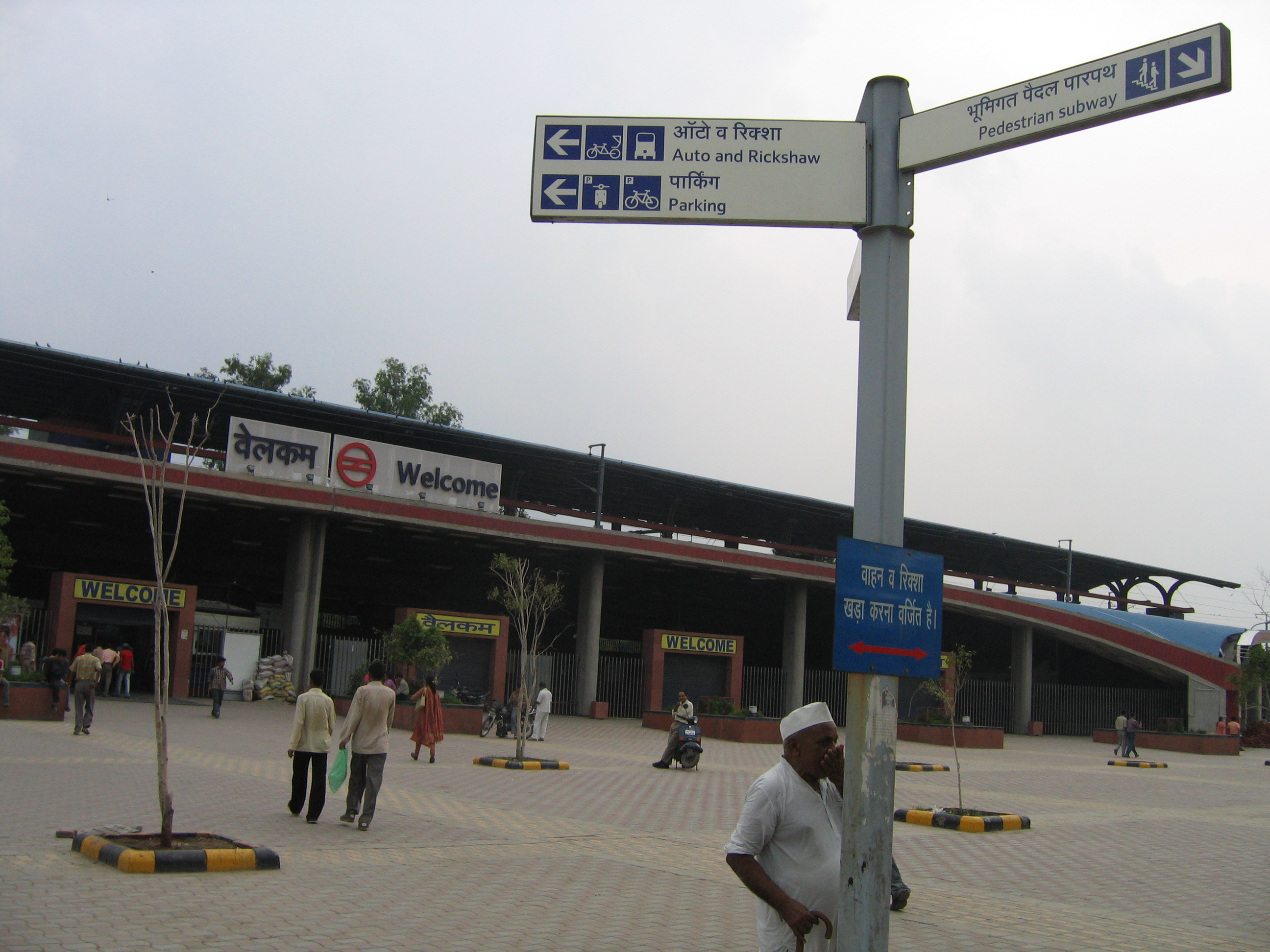
- Welcome metro station

General information
- Location: B1 Block, Block B, Shahdara, Welcome Colony, New Delhi, Delhi 110031
- Coordinates: 28°40′20″N 77°16′40″E
- System: Delhi Metro station
- Owner: Delhi Government
- Line: Red Line Pink Line
- Platforms: Island platform Red Line; Platform 1 → Rithala; Platform 2 → Shaheed Sthal; Side platform Pink Line; Platform 3 → "-" Circular Line; Platform 4 → "+" Circular Line
- Tracks: 4

Construction
- Structure type: Red Line - At-grade; Pink Line - Elevated
- Parking: Available
- Accessible: Yes

Other information
- Station code: WC

History
- Opened: 25 December 2002; 23 years ago Red Line 31 October 2018; 8 years ago Pink Line
- Electrified: 25 kV 50 Hz AC through overhead catenary

Services
| Preceding station | Delhi Metro | Following station |
|---|---|---|
| Seelampur towards Rithala | Red Line | Shahdara towards Shaheed Sthal (New Bus Adda) |
| East Azad Nagar towards Maujpur - Babarpur | Pink Line | Jaffrabad towards Maujpur - Babarpur |
Route map
Location

The Welcome metro station is an interchange station between the Red and Pink lines of the Delhi Metro. Located on GT Road, it serves the areas of Shahdara, Welcome Colony and Seelampur in north-eastern Delhi.

Welcome was among the stations opened during the initial phase of the Delhi Metro's Phase I in December 2002. It later became an interchange station with the Pink Line, constructed under Phase III, on 31 October 2018.

== Station layout ==
Station Layout Red Line

| P | Platform 2 Eastbound | Towards → Shaheed Sthal (New Bus Adda); Next Station: Shahdara |
| P | Island platform | Doors will open on the right |
| P | Platform 1 Westbound | Towards ← Rithala; Next Station: Seelampur |
| L1 | Concourse | Fare control, station agent, Ticket/token, shops |
| G | Street Level | Exit/ Entrance |

Station Layout Pink Line

| L2 | Side platform | Doors will open on the left |
| L2 | Platform 3 Anticlockwise | "-" Circular Line (Anticlockwise); Via: Jaffrabad, Maujpur - Babarpur, Yamuna Vihar, Bhajanpura, Khajuri Khas, Nanaksar - Sonia Vihar, Jagatpur - Wazirabad, Burari, Majlis Park, Azadpur, Shalimar Bagh, Netaji Subhash Place, Punjabi Bagh West, Rajouri Garden, Mayapuri, Naraina Vihar, Delhi Cantt. Next Station: Jaffrabad |
| L2 | Platform 4 Clockwise | "+" Circular Line (Clockwise); Via: East Azad Nagar, Krishna Nagar, Karkarduma, Anand Vihar, IP Extension, Trilokpuri - Sanjay Lake, Shree Ram Mandir Mayur Vihar, Mayur Vihar-I, Sarai Kale Khan - Nizamuddin, Lajpat Nagar, South Extension, Dilli Haat - INA, Sarojini Nagar, Sir M. Vishweshwaraiah Moti Bagh, Durgabai Deshmukh South Campus; Next Station: East Azad Nagar |
| L2 | Side platform | Doors will open on the left |
| L1 | Concourse | Fare control, station agent, Metro Card vending machines, crossover |
| G | Street Level | Exit/Entrance |

== Facilities ==
This is a disabled friendly (Divyang friendly) metro station with food facilities, DMRC authorised parking and toilets.

== See also ==
- List of Delhi Metro stations
