= Shalimar Bagh metro station =

Metro station in Delhi, India

Shalimar Bagh

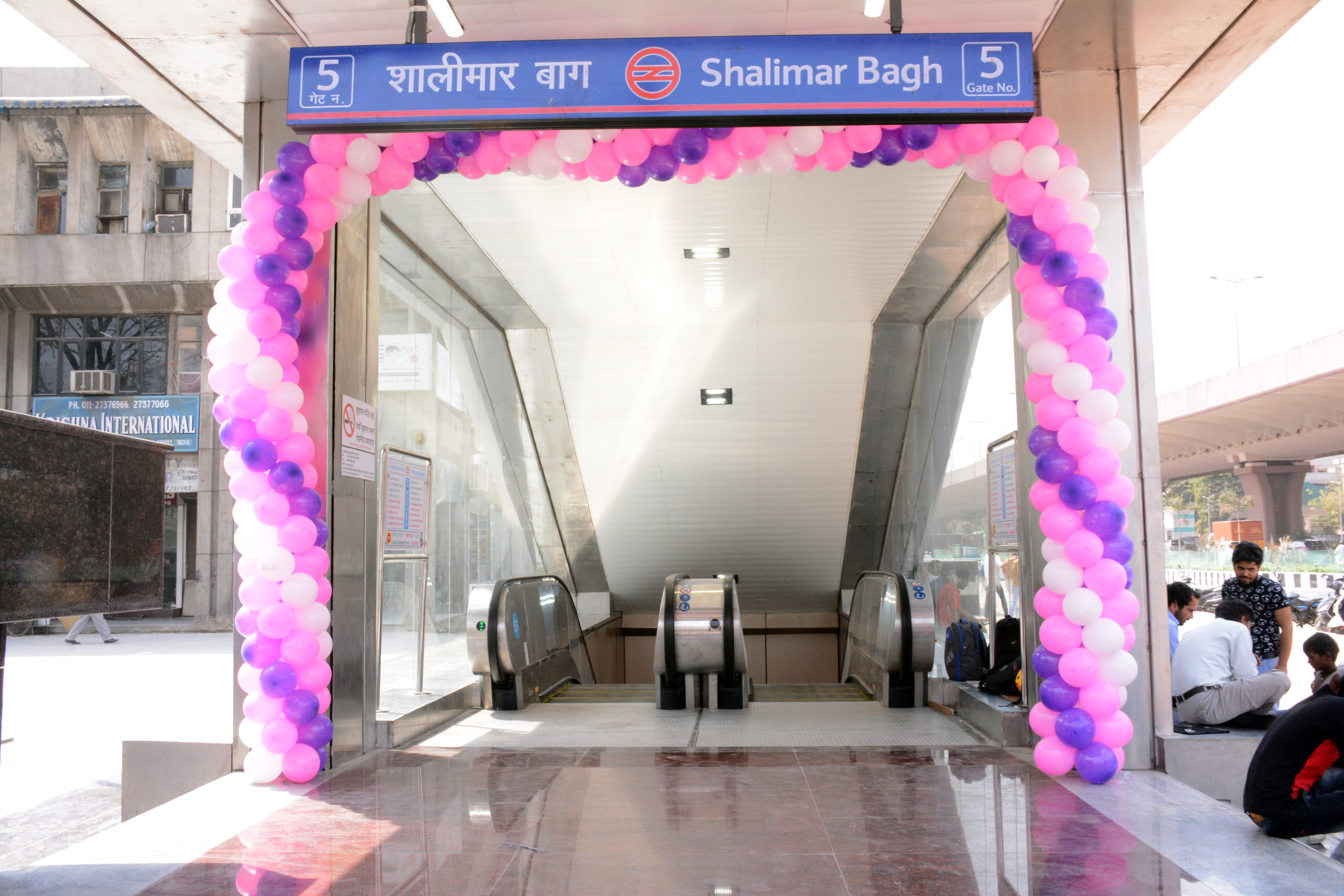

General information
- Location: Block AG, Poorbi Shalimar Bagh, Shalimar Bagh, Delhi, 110088
- Coordinates: 28°42′07″N 77°09′55″E
- System: Delhi Metro station
- Owner: Delhi Metro
- Operator: Delhi Metro Rail Corporation (DMRC)
- Line: Pink Line
- Platforms: Island platform Platform 1 → "-" Circular Line; Platform 2 → "+" Circular Line
- Tracks: 2

Construction
- Structure type: Underground, double-track
- Depth: 16 metres (52 ft)
- Platform levels: 2
- Accessible: Yes

Other information
- Status: Staffed, Operational
- Station code: SMBG

History
- Opened: 14 March 2018; 8 years ago
- Electrified: 25 kV 50 Hz AC through overhead catenary

Services
Preceding station	Delhi Metro	Following station
Azadpur towards Maujpur - Babarpur	Pink Line	Netaji Subhash Place towards Shiv Vihar
Route map
Location

Shalimar Bagh is a metro station located on the Pink Line of the Delhi Metro.

== Station layout ==
G	Street Level	Exit/Entrance
C	Concourse	Fare control, station agent, Ticket/token, shops
P	Platform 1 Anticlockwise	"-" Circular Line (Anticlockwise); Via: Netaji Subhash Place, Shakurpur, Punjabi Bagh West, ESI - Basaidarapur, Rajouri Garden, Mayapuri, Naraina Vihar, Delhi Cantonment, Durgabai Deshmukh South Campus, Sir M. Vishweshwaraiah Moti Bagh, Sarojini Nagar, Dilli Haat - INA, South Extension, Lajpat Nagar, Sarai Kale Khan - Nizamuddin, Mayur Vihar-I, Shree Ram Mandir Mayur Vihar, Trilokpuri - Sanjay Lake; Next Station: Netaji Subhash Place; Change at the next station for Red Line
P	Island platform | Doors will open on the right
P	Platform 2 Clockwise	"+" Circular Line (Clockwise); Via: Azadpur, Majlis Park, Burari, Jagatpur - Wazirabad, Nanaksar - Sonia Vihar, Bhajanpura, Yamuna Vihar, Maujpur - Babarpur, Welcome, Karkarduma, Anand Vihar, IP Extension; Next Station: Azadpur; Change at the next station for Yellow Line

== Entry/Exit ==
Shalimar Bagh metro station Entry/exits
Gate No-1	Gate No-2	Gate No-3	Gate No-4	Gate No-5
Ashok Vihar Crossing, Shalimar Bagh Block-A, Kendriya Vidyalaya	Shalimar Bagh Block-A	Wazirpur Fire Station, Wazirpur Industrial Area	Wazirpur Computer Market	Wazirpur Computer Market, EPFO, K C Goel Marg

== See also ==
- Delhi
- List of Delhi Metro stations
- Transport in Delhi
- Delhi Metro Rail Corporation
- Delhi Suburban Railway
- Inner Ring Road, Delhi
- Delhi Monorail
- Delhi Transport Corporation
- North Delhi
- New Delhi
- National Capital Region (India)
- List of rapid transit systems
- List of metro systems
