= Maujpur - Babarpur metro station =

Metro station in Delhi, India

Maujpur - Babarpur

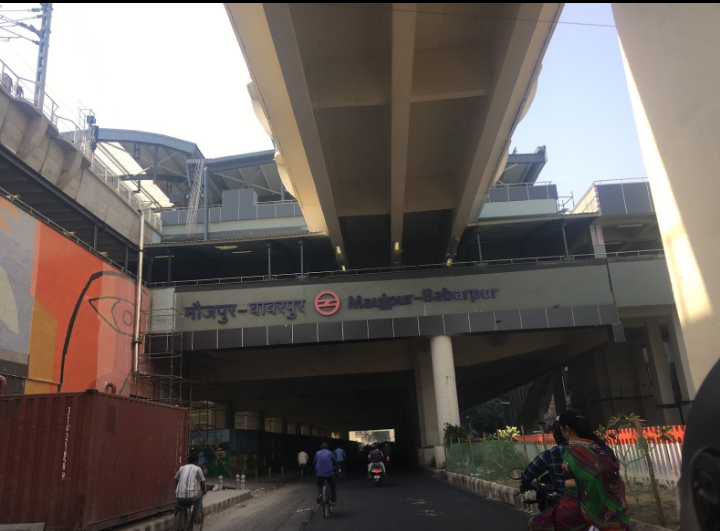

General information
- Location: Shahadara Drain, Maujpur - Babarpur, Delhi, 110053
- Coordinates: 28°41′31″N 77°16′47″E
- System: Delhi Metro station
- Owner: Delhi Metro
- Line: Pink Line
- Platforms: Side Platform; Platform 1 → "+" Circular Line; Platform 2 → "-" Circular Line; Platform 3 → Shiv Vihar; Platform 4 → Train terminates
- Tracks: 2

Construction
- Structure type: Elevated
- Platform levels: 2
- Accessible: Yes

Other information
- Station code: MUPR

History
- Opened: 31 October 2018; 8 years ago
- Electrified: 25 kV 50 Hz AC through overhead catenary

Services
Preceding station	Delhi Metro	Following station
Jaffrabad towards Maujpur - Babarpur	Pink Line	Yamuna Vihar towards Maujpur - Babarpur
Terminus	Pink Line	Gokulpuri towards Shiv Vihar
Route map
Location

Maujpur–Babarpur is an elevated metro station on the Pink Line of the Delhi Metro, located in northeast Delhi. It is situated at the junction of the Pink Line's circular corridor and its branch towards Shiv Vihar.

It is located near Maujpur Chowk on Asha Ram Tyagi Marg in northeast Delhi. Originally opened in October 2018 as part of Phase III, the station was designed with four platforms to facilitate interchange between the Pink Line's circular corridor and its branch towards Shiv Vihar. Following the opening of the Majlis Park–Maujpur section in March 2026, it became the junction between the fully operational circular route and the separate Maujpur–Shiv Vihar branch, with passengers able to change trains at platform level.

== Station layout ==
L2	Side platform | Doors will open on the left
L2	Platform 2 Anticlockwise	"-" Circular Line (Anticlockwise); Via: Yamuna Vihar, Bhajanpura, Khajuri Khas, Nanaksar - Sonia Vihar, Jagatpur - Wazirabad, Burari, Majlis Park, Azadpur, Shalimar Bagh, Netaji Subhash Place, Punjabi Bagh West, Rajouri Garden, Mayapuri, Naraina Vihar, Delhi Cantt., Durgabai Deshmukh South Campus; Next Station: Yamuna Vihar
L2	Platform 1 Clockwise	"+" Circular Line (Clockwise); Via: Jaffrabad, Welcome, Karkarduma, Anand Vihar, IP Extension, Trilokpuri - Sanjay Lake, Shree Ram Mandir Mayur Vihar, Mayur Vihar-I, Sarai Kale Khan - Nizamuddin, Lajpat Nagar, South Extension, Dilli Haat - INA, Sarojini Nagar, Sir M. Vishweshwaraiah Moti Bagh; Next Station: Jaffrabad
L2	Island platform | P1 & P3 doors will open on the left
L2	Platform 3 Northbound	Towards → Shiv Vihar; Next Station: Gokulpuri
L2	Platform 4 Southbound	Towards ← Train terminates here
L2	Side platform | Doors will open on the left
L1	Concourse	Fare control, station agent, Metro Card vending machines, crossover
G	Street level	Exit/Entrance

== See also ==
- List of Delhi Metro stations
- Transport in Delhi
- Delhi Metro Rail Corporation
- Delhi Suburban Railway
