= South Extension =

- Neighborhood of Delhi
- Location in Delhi, India
- Coordinates: 28.570219°N 77.219703°E
- Country: India
- State: Delhi
- District: South Delhi

Languages
  - Official: Hindi
- Time zone: UTC+5:30 (IST)
- Planning agency: MCD

South Extension or New Delhi South Extension (NDSE) is a neighbourhood of South Delhi, India. It is also described as a premier shopping destination. Situated on the Ring Road, Delhi, just east of All India Institute of Medical Sciences. The colony is divided into two parts - South Extension I and South Extension II. It has a population of about 50,000 people in South Extension Part 1 and 27,000 in South Extension Part 2.

A Delhi Metro station as part of Metro's Phase III extension has started commercial operations from 6 August 2018.

== Description ==
Originally part of the Kotla Mubarakpur village before existence , South Extension is located on the Ring Road, South Extension (known to locals as "South Ex") is a huge neighbourhood in South Delhi and is divided into two parts: South Extension - Part I and South Extension - Part II. South Extension is also known to be one of Delhi's most high-end markets. Along with Connaught Place and Khan Market, South Extension is known to cater to the shopping desires of the rich and the elite. While, plot rates averaging at Rs. 63,169.22/sqft make the neighbourhood one of the most expensive residential areas in Delhi, the rental rates averaging at Rs.700/sqft, make South Extension the 5th most expensive commercial real estate in India. The 2023 Knight Frank India survey ranks South Extension at the 4th, among the Top 30 High Streets in India.

== Historical sites ==
South Extension is also home to two tombs from the Mughal era. The Bade and Chote Khan’s twin tombs in South Extension are preserved in pretty good shape. They form part of one of the major components of the Kotla Mubarakpur complex, which includes several other lesser known tombs, mostly from the pre-Mughal era, belonging to various kings and noblemen of the notable Lodi and Sayyid dynasties. "Bade Khan Ka Gumbad" is slightly bigger of the two tombs, it dates back to the 16th century, as per archaeologists.

The front is intricately carved, while the centre is surrounded by three rows of niches. The central niche in each row is larger than the other two. It looks like a typical Lodhi-era tomb with octagonal turrets at the corners covered by umbrella type structures at the top. The interiors were once intricately crafted, but now they look a bit worn out. The structure is supported by four massive pillars on all four corners.

== Areas In South Delhi ==
- Ayur Vigyan Nagar
- Kalkaji
- Lajpat Nagar
- Mehrauli
- Nehru Place
- Malviya Nagar
- Saket
- Sarita Vihar
- Greater Kailash
- Chittaranjan Park
- Kotla Mubarakpur
