= Trilokpuri - Sanjay Lake metro station =

Metro station in Delhi, India

Trilokpuri - Sanjay Lake

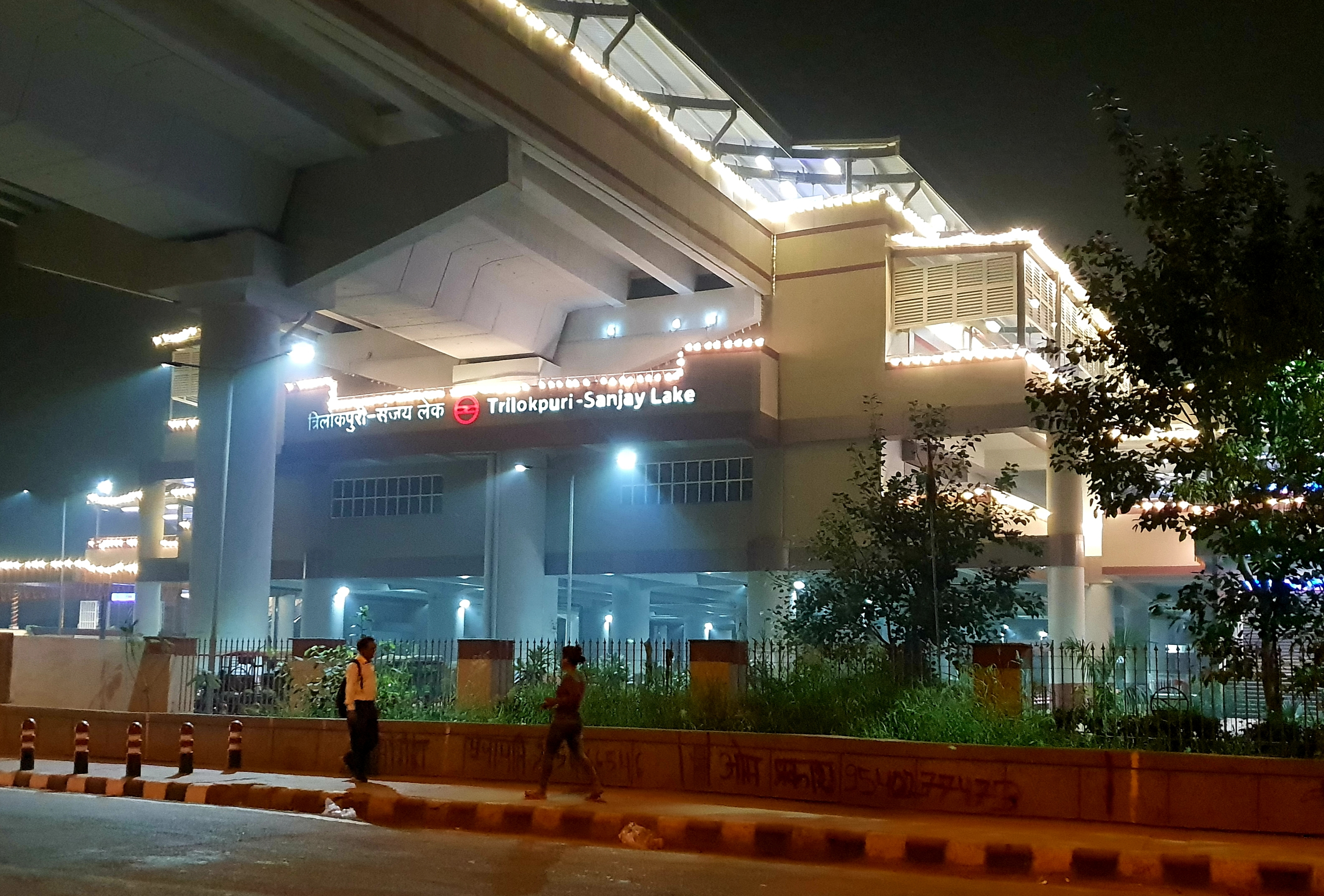

General information
- Location: Chand Cinema Rd, Mayur Vihar Phase II, Trilokpuri, New Delhi, 110091
- Coordinates: 28°36′49″N 77°18′32″E
- System: Delhi Metro station
- Owner: Delhi Metro
- Operator: Delhi Metro Rail Corporation (DMRC)
- Line: Pink Line
- Platforms: Side platform Platform 1 → "-" Circular Line; Platform 2 → "+" Circular Line
- Tracks: 2

Construction
- Structure type: Elevated, Double-track
- Platform levels: 2
- Accessible: Yes

Other information
- Status: Staffed, Operational
- Station code: TKPR

History
- Opened: 31 October 2018; 7 years ago
- Electrified: 25 kV 50 Hz AC through overhead catenary

Services
| Preceding station | Delhi Metro | Following station |
|---|---|---|
| Shree Ram Mandir Mayur Vihar towards Maujpur - Babarpur | Pink Line | East Vinod Nagar - Mayur Vihar-II towards Shiv Vihar |
Route map
Location

Trilokpuri - Sanjay Lake is a metro station is located on the Pink Line of the Delhi Metro. It opened on 31 October 2018, as a part of Phase III of the Delhi Metro.

== Station layout ==
| L2 | Side platform | Doors will open on the left |
| L2 | 'Platform 1 Anticlockwise | "-" Circular Line (Anticlockwise); Via: East Vinod Nagar - Mayur Vihar-II, Mandawali - West Vinod Nagar, IP Extension, Anand Vihar, Karkarduma, Krishna Nagar, Welcome, Maujpur - Babarpur, Yamuna Vihar, Bhajanpura, Nanaksar - Sonia Vihar, Jagatpur - Wazirabad, Burari, Majlis Park, Azadpur, Shalimar Bagh, Netaji Subhash Place, Punjabi Bagh West; Next Station: East Vinod Nagar - Mayur Vihar-II |
| L2 | Platform 2 Clockwise | "+" Circular Line (Clockwise); Via: Shree Ram Mandir Mayur Vihar, Mayur Vihar-I, Sarai Kale Khan - Nizamuddin, Lajpat Nagar, South Extension, Dilli Haat - INA, Sarojini Nagar, Sir M. Vishweshwaraiah Moti Bagh, Durgabai Deshmukh South Campus, Delhi Cantt., Naraina Vihar, Mayapuri, Rajouri Garden; Next Station: Shree Ram Mandir Mayur Vihar |
| L2 | Side platform | Doors will open on the left |
| L1 | Concourse | Fare control, station agent, Metro Card vending machines, crossover |
| G | Street level | Exit/Entrance |

== Entry/Exit ==
Trilokpuri - Sanjay Lake metro station Entry/exits
| Gate No-1 | Gate No-2 |

== Connections ==
=== Bus ===
Delhi Transport Corporation bus routes number 118EXT, 306, 307A, 309, 311A, 344, 378, 611, 611B, YMS(-) (+) serves the station from nearby Trilokpuri 13 Block bus stop.

Miraj Cinema (Chand Cinema)

It is also well connected to Miraj Cinema (formerly known as Chand Cinema), located approximately 200 meters from the station. Miraj Cinema houses outlets such as Burger King and KFC, with Bikanervala set to open soon.

== See also ==
- Delhi
- List of Delhi Metro stations
- Transport in Delhi
- Delhi Metro Rail Corporation
- Delhi Suburban Railway
- Delhi Monorail
- Sanjay Lake
- Delhi Transport Corporation
- East Delhi
- New Delhi
- National Capital Region (India)
- List of rapid transit systems
- List of metro systems
