= Nanaksar - Sonia Vihar metro station =

Metro station in Delhi, India

Nanaksar - Sonia Vihar

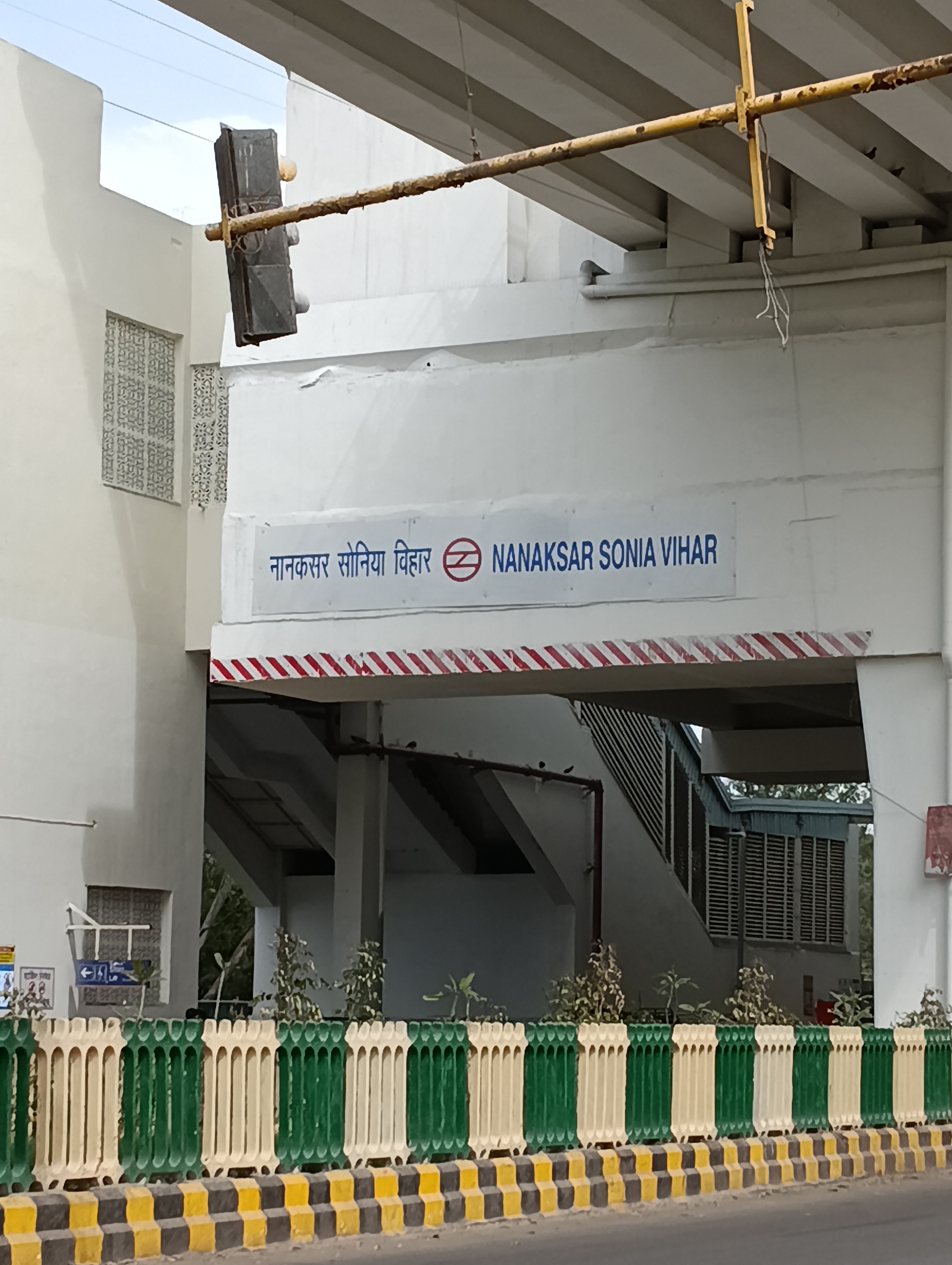

General information
- System: Delhi Metro station
- Owner: Delhi Metro
- Operator: Delhi Metro Rail Corporation (DMRC)
- Line: Pink Line
- Platforms: Side Platform; Platform 1 → "-" Circular Line; Platform 2 → "+" Circular Line
- Tracks: 2

Construction
- Structure type: Elevated, Double-track
- Platform levels: 2
- Accessible: Yes

Other information
- Status: Staffed, Operational

History
- Opened: 8 March 2026; 5 months ago
- Electrified: 25 kV 50 Hz AC through overhead catenary

Services
Preceding station	Delhi Metro	Following station
Khajuri Khas towards Maujpur - Babarpur	Pink Line	Jagatpur - Wazirabad towards Maujpur - Babarpur
Train services on "-" Circular Line will skip Soorghat and proceed towards Jagatpur - Wazirabad
Route map
Location

The Nanaksar - Sonia Vihar metro station (formerly known as Sonia Vihar) is located on the Pink Line of the Delhi Metro. This station is part of Phase IV of Delhi Metro.

== Station layout ==
L2	Side platform | Doors will open on the left
L2	Platform 1 Anticlockwise	"-" Circular Line (Anticlockwise); Via: Jagatpur - Wazirabad, Burari, Majlis Park, Azadpur, Shalimar Bagh, Netaji Subhash Place, Punjabi Bagh West, Rajouri Garden, Mayapuri, Naraina Vihar, Delhi Cantt., Durgabai Deshmukh South Campus, Sir M. Vishweshwaraiah Moti Bagh, Sarojini Nagar, Dilli Haat - INA, South Extension; Next Station: Jagatpur - Wazirabad (Skipping Soorghat)
L2	Platform 2 Clockwise	"+" Circular Line (Clockwise); Via: Khajuri Khas, Bhajanpura, Yamuna Vihar, Maujpur - Babarpur, Welcome, Karkarduma, Anand Vihar, IP Extension, Trilokpuri - Sanjay Lake, Shree Ram Mandir Mayur Vihar, Mayur Vihar-I, Sarai Kale Khan - Nizamuddin, Lajpat Nagar; Next Station: Khajuri Khas
L2	Side platform | Doors will open on the left
L1	Concourse	Fare control, station agent, Metro Card vending machines, crossover
G	Street level	Exit/Entrance

== See also ==
- Delhi
- List of Delhi Metro stations
- Delhi Transport Corporation
- Transport in Delhi
