= Bhajanpura metro station =

Metro station in Delhi, India

Bhajanpura

General information
- System: Delhi Metro station
- Owner: Delhi Metro
- Operator: Delhi Metro Rail Corporation (DMRC)
- Line: Pink Line
- Platforms: Side Platform; Platform 1 → "-" Circular Line; Platform 2 → "+" Circular Line
- Tracks: 2

Construction
- Structure type: Elevated
- Platform levels: 2
- Accessible: Yes

History
- Opened: 8 March 2026; 8 months ago
- Electrified: 25 kV 50 Hz AC through overhead catenary

Services
Preceding station	Delhi Metro	Following station
Yamuna Vihar towards Maujpur - Babarpur	Pink Line	Khajuri Khas towards Maujpur - Babarpur
Route map
Location

Bhajanpura is an elevated metro station on the Pink Line of the Delhi Metro, located in North East Delhi. It commenced passenger operations on 8 March 2026 as part of the Majlis Park–Maujpur-Babarpur extension of the Pink Line. The station serves the Bhajanpura locality and surrounding areas, including Chand Bagh.

== Station layout ==
L2	Side platform | Doors will open on the left
L2	Platform 1 Anticlockwise	"-" Circular Line (Anticlockwise); Via: Khajuri Khas,Nanaksar - Sonia Vihar, Jagatpur - Wazirabad, Burari, Majlis Park, Azadpur, Shalimar Bagh, Netaji Subhash Place, Punjabi Bagh West, Rajouri Garden, Mayapuri, Naraina Vihar, Delhi Cantt., Durgabai Deshmukh South Campus, Sir M. Vishweshwaraiah Moti Bagh, Sarojini Nagar, Dilli Haat - INA; Next Station: Khajuri Khas
L2	Platform 2 Clockwise	"+" Circular Line (Clockwise); Via: Yamuna Vihar, Maujpur - Babarpur, Welcome, Karkarduma, Anand Vihar, IP Extension, Trilokpuri - Sanjay Lake, Shree Ram Mandir Mayur Vihar, Mayur Vihar-I, Sarai Kale Khan - Nizamuddin, Lajpat Nagar, South Extension; Next Station: Yamuna Vihar
L2	Side platform | Doors will open on the left
L1	Concourse	Fare control, station agent, Metro Card vending machines, crossover
G	Street level	Exit/Entrance

== See also ==
- Delhi Transport Corporation
- Transport in Delhi
- List of Delhi Metro stations
