= Netaji Subhash Place metro station =

Metro station in Delhi, India

Netaji Subhash Place

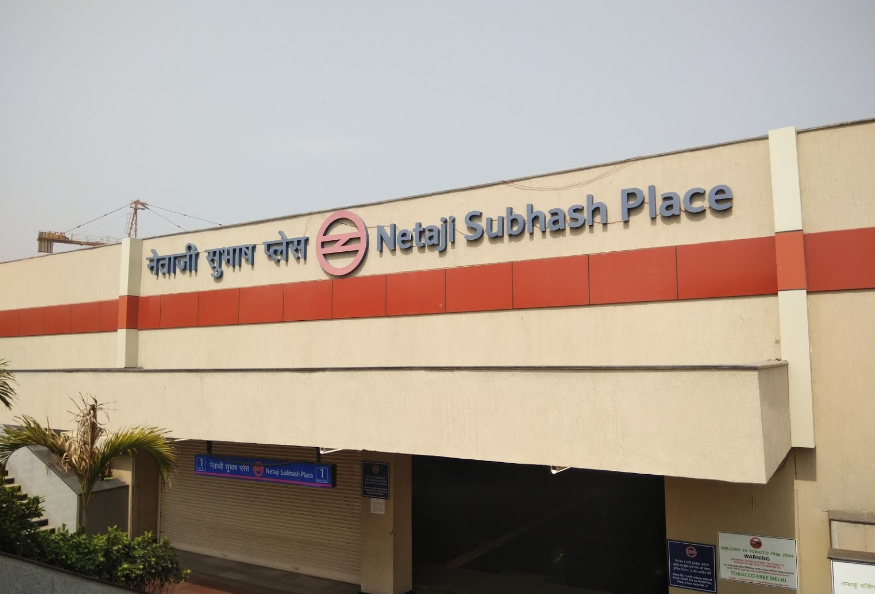

General information
- Location: Netaji Subhash Place, Delhi
- Coordinates: 28°41′45″N 77°09′09″E
- System: Delhi Metro station
- Owner: Delhi Metro
- Operator: Delhi Metro Rail Corporation
- Line: Red Line Pink Line
- Platforms: Side platform Red Line; Platform 1 → Rithala; Platform 2 → Shaheed Sthal; Side platform Pink Line; Platform 3 → "-" Circular Line; Platform 4 → "+" Circular Line
- Tracks: 4

Construction
- Structure type: Red Line - Elevated; Pink Line - Underground
- Platform levels: 2
- Parking: Available
- Accessible: Yes

Other information
- Station code: NSHP

History
- Opened: 31 March 2004; 22 years ago Red Line; 14 March 2018; 8 years ago Pink Line
- Electrified: 25 kV 50 Hz AC through overhead catenary

Services
Preceding station	Delhi Metro	Following station
Kohat Enclave towards Rithala	Red Line	Keshav Puram towards Shaheed Sthal (New Bus Adda)
Shalimar Bagh towards Maujpur - Babarpur	Pink Line	Shakurpur towards Shiv Vihar
Route map
Location

Netaji Subhash Place (NSP) is an interchange metro station on the Red Line and Pink Line of the Delhi Metro, serving the Netaji Subhash Place area in Delhi. The interchange became operational on 14 March 2018 with the opening of the first section of the Pink Line. It provides an alternative route for passengers travelling between the Blue Line and Red Line, helping them avoid the interchange at Kashmere Gate via the Yellow Line.

== Station layout ==
L2	Side platform | Doors will open on the left
L2	Platform 2 Eastbound	Towards → Shaheed Sthal (New Bus Adda); Next Station: Keshav Puram
L2	Platform 1 Westbound	Towards ← Rithala; Next Station: Kohat Enclave
L2	Side platform | Doors will open on the left
L1	Concourse	Fare control, station agent, Metro Card vending machines, crossover
G	Street Level	Exit/Entrance
C	Concourse	Fare control, station agent, Ticket/token, shops
P	Side platform | Doors will open on the left
P	Platform 3 Anticlockwise	"-" Circular Line (Anticlockwise); Via: Shakurpur, Punjabi Bagh West, ESI - Basaidarapur, Rajouri Garden, Mayapuri, Naraina Vihar, Delhi Cantonment, Durgabai Deshmukh South Campus, Sir M. Vishweshwaraiah Moti Bagh, Sarojini Nagar, Dilli Haat - INA, South Extension, Lajpat Nagar, Sarai Kale Khan - Nizamuddin, Mayur Vihar-I, Shree Ram Mandir Mayur Vihar, Trilokpuri - Sanjay Lake, IP Extension; Next Station: Shakurpur
P	Platform 4 Clockwise	"+" Circular Line (Clockwise); Via: Shalimar Bagh, Azadpur, Majlis Park, Burari, Jagatpur - Wazirabad, Nanaksar - Sonia Vihar, Bhajanpura, Yamuna Vihar, Maujpur - Babarpur, Welcome, Karkarduma, Anand Vihar; Next Station: Shalimar Bagh
P	Side platform | Doors will open on the left

== Entry/Exit ==
Netaji Subhash Place metro station Entry/exits
Gate No-1	Gate No-2	Gate No-3
Pacific Mall, Ring Road, Punjab Kesari	Pacific Mall, Unity One Elegente Mall, Lala Jagat Narayan Marg, D Mall	

== See also ==
- Delhi
- List of Delhi Metro stations
- Transport in Delhi
- Delhi Metro Rail Corporation
- Delhi Suburban Railway
- Inner Ring Road, Delhi
- Delhi Monorail
- Delhi Transport Corporation
- North Delhi
- New Delhi
- National Capital Region (India)
- List of rapid transit systems
- List of metro systems
