= Shiv Vihar metro station =

Metro station in Delhi, India

Shiv Vihar शिव विहार

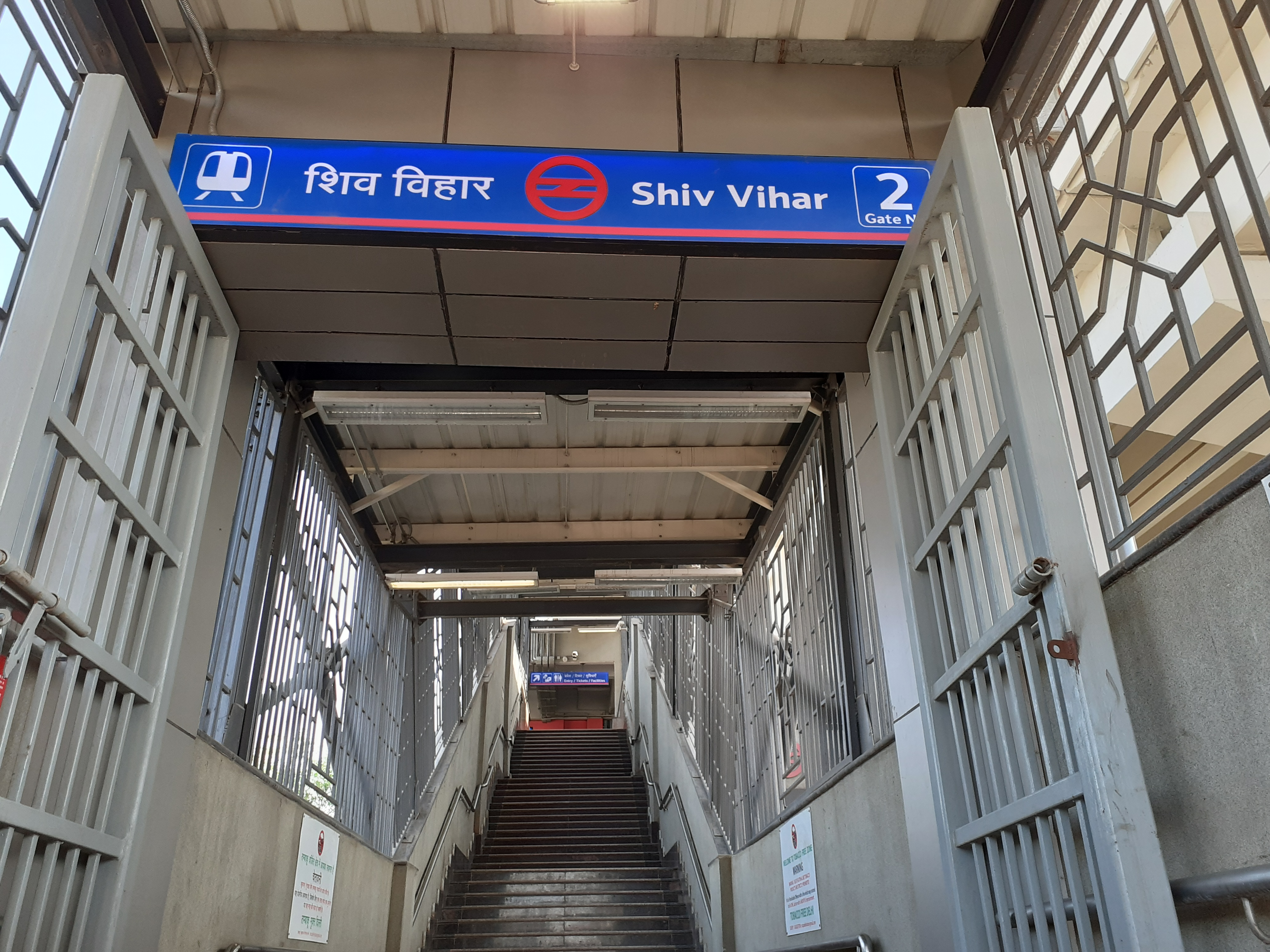

General information
- Location: Delhi – U.P Border, Jeewanpur, Shiv Vihar, near Karawal Nagar, Delhi, 110094
- Coordinates: 28°43′18″N 77°17′22″E
- System: Delhi Metro station
- Owner: Delhi Metro
- Line: Pink Line
- Platforms: Side Platform; Platform 1 → Train terminates Platform 2 → Maujpur - Babarpur
- Tracks: 3

Construction
- Structure type: Elevated
- Platform levels: 2
- Parking: no
- Accessible: Yes

Other information
- Station code: SVVR

History
- Opened: 31 October 2018; 8 years ago
- Electrified: 25 kV 50 Hz AC through overhead catenary

Services
Preceding station	Delhi Metro	Following station
Johri Enclave towards Maujpur - Babarpur	Pink Line	Terminus
Route map
Location

Shiv Vihar is an elevated terminal station on the Pink Line of the Delhi Metro. It was opened to the public on 31 October 2018 as part of the Trilokpuri Sanjay Lake–Shiv Vihar section of Phase III. Despite its name, the station is located at the Loni border, along National Highway 709B, near Jawahar Nagar in Uttar Pradesh. The Shiv Vihar residential locality, situated in the Karawal Nagar area of northeast Delhi, is approximately 1.6 km (0.99 mi) from the station.

As part of Phase III of the Delhi Metro, Shiv Vihar serves as the terminal station of the Pink Line's branch towards Maujpur-Babarpur. The branch connects with the Pink Line's circular corridor at Maujpur-Babarpur, from where passengers can interchange to travel along the circular route. The circular corridor was completed with the opening of the Majlis Park–Maujpur-Babarpur section on 8 March 2026.

== Station layout ==
L2	Side platform | Doors will open on the left
L2	Platform 1 Northeast Bound	Towards → Train terminates here
L2	Platform 2 Northwest Bound	Towards ← Maujpur - Babarpur; Next Station: Johri Enclave
L2	Side platform | Doors will open on the left
L1	Concourse	Fare control, station agent, Metro Card vending machines, crossover
G	Street level	Exit/Entrance

== See also ==
- List of Delhi Metro stations
- Transport in Delhi
- Delhi Metro Rail Corporation
- Delhi Suburban Railway
