= Bijwasan railway station =

Railway station in Delhi, India

Bijwasan

General information
- Location: Nayak Pura, Bijwasan, South Delhi district, Delhi; India
- Coordinates: 28.5370°N 77.0513°E
- Elevation: 220 m (722 ft)
- System: Indian Railway and Delhi Suburban Railway station
- Lines: Delhi Ring Railway; Delhi–Fazilka line Delhi–Jaipur line
- Platforms: 8
- Tracks: 12 BG
- Connections: Taxi stand, auto stand

Construction
- Structure type: Standard (on-ground station)
- Parking: Available
- Cycle facilities: Available
- Accessible: Disabled access

Other information
- Station code: BWSN
- Zone(s): Northern Railway Railway
- Division(s): Delhi

History
- Electrified: Construction – double-line electrification

Services
Preceding station	Indian Railways	Following station
Shahabad Mohammadpur towards ?	Northern Railway zone Delhi Ring Railway	Palam Vihar Halt towards ?
Location
- Location within India Location within Haryana Location within Delhi

Bijwasan railway station (code BWSN), on Delhi–Jaipur line and also part of Delhi Suburban Railway, located immediate southwest of Delhi's main airport the IGI Airport, in Bijwasan in South Delhi in India, is a major railway connectivity hub for the IGI Airport (along with the Aerocity connectivity hub) and will also connect to the under-construction Haryana Orbital Rail Corridor in south at Patli railway station.

Bijwasan railway station, along with Old Delhi railway station, New Delhi railway station Hazrat Nizamuddin Railway Station, Anand Vihar Terminal, and Sarai Rohilla Railway Station, serve as the six primary railway stations catering to Delhi state.

== History ==
=== 1874-2021: Origin ===
Bijwasan railway station came up on the Rajputana State Railway line which was constructed in 1874 till Bandikui Junction railway station, and extended to Ajmer in 1875 and to Ahmedabad in 1881.

=== 2022 onwards: Redevelopment ===
Redevelopment plan was conceived in fy 2008-09 with construction commencement date of 2016 and target completion by August 2013. However, construction did not commence due to various issues including land acquisition, approval for the height of new railway buildings due to proximity to the airport, environmental and forests permission for cutting trees, etc.

==== Phase-I 2022-26: Upgraded station ====
In 2017, when the station consisted of only two spartan partially-covered platforms, the plan was conceived to upgrade two stations in Delhi, Bijwasan station and Anand Vihar Terminal, to the world class regional multimodal transport hub, construction for which commenced in 2022. Rs 728.92 crore airport-style upgrade, including Rs 430 crore 1.24 lakh sq metres new terminal with a new expanded 30,400 sqm station building and 12,500 sqm air concourse, and rest of budget for the 1,23,500 sqm road network in and around the station for smooth entry & exit of passenger motor vehicles, a sewage treatment plant and water treatment plant, will see the number of platforms increased to 8 (previously 2) each with elevators, four passenger subway underpasses to transit among platforms, separate arrival and departure area, separate pick up and drop off areas, airspace concourse with waiting area, commercial and retail shops, and other commuter-centric facilities, underground bus bays on north side.

From 2026, to relive the congestion at New Delhi stations, Old Delhi stations and Hazrat Nizamuddin Railway stations, the long-distance trains to Gujarat, Rajasthan, Maharashtra and Madhya Pradesh were transferred to the Bijwasan station, which will commence from and terminate at the Bijwasan station. In 2025-26 in Delhi, which received nearly 700 trains daily, various stations were upgraded with the view to increase the capacity to 1400 trains daily.

==== Phase-II 2026-onwards: Commercial Railcity precinct ====
Phase-II entails the addition of commercial and retail buildings in the form of railcity similar to the Delhi aerocity.

== Train service ==
Bijwasan, on Delhi–Jaipur line under Delhi railway division of Northern Railway zone of Indian Railway, has following trains (partial list):

=== Long-distance trains ===
- Delhi Cantt Jodhpur Jn Vande Bharat Express (Train No. 26482): This is a key express train that stops at Bijwasan, connecting Delhi with Jodhpur.
- Delhi-Jodhpur Mandore Express (Train No. 22995)
- Delhi-Shri Ganganagar Express (Train Nos. 14029 & 14030) via Rewari-Bhiwani-Hisar
- Several passenger and DEMU trains to nearby areas like Rewari, Hisar, Farrukh Nagar, and Old Delhi.

=== Delhi suburban trains ===
Some of Delhi Suburban Railway trains, including Delhi Ring Railway and various spokes within the Delhi NCR, operate via Bijwasan.

== Connectivity ==
=== Attractions ===
It lies 2.5 km southeast of 220-acre Bharat Vandana Park (2 minutes or 1 metro station away on Blue line to Dwarka Sector 8 metro station), 1.5 northeast of Yashobhoomi convention centre (2 minutes or 1 metro station away on Yellow line to Yashobhoomi Dwarka Sector - 25 metro station), 5 km west of IGI Airport ((2 minutes or 1 metro station away on Yellow line to IGI Airport metro station), 10 km southwest of Indian Air Force Museum, Palam. 4 km east of DDA Dwarka Golf Club, 10 km northeast of Najafgarh drain bird sanctuary, 20 km northeast of Sultanpur National Park, and 20 km west of Qutub Minar complex.

=== Railway ===
Haryana Orbital Rail Corridor (HORC) will be connected at Patli in south.

"Hisar International Airport-IGI Airport line" (HIAIGI Line) will directly connect IGI with Hisar airport. In first phase, the missing Garhi Harsaru–Farukhnagar–Jhajjar rail link will be constructed. In the second phase, a short Hisar Airport rail line spur from the Jakhal–Hisar line to Hisar airport will be constructed. There is already an existing link from Bijwasan to Garhi Harsaru.

"IGI Airport–Noida Airport Railway line" (IGINAR Line): the Noida Airport will be directly connected with IGI via "Palwal-Noida Airport-Khurja Railway" (PNAKR line) and HORC.

Major long-distance railway stations nearby within Delhi are:

- Delhi Junction railway station
- New Delhi railway station
- Hazrat Nizamuddin railway station
- Delhi Sarai Rohilla railway station
- Anand Vihar Terminal railway station

=== Metro ===
Adjacent Dwarka Sector 21 metro station, a metro interchange of Delhi Metro, provides connectivity to Blue Line and the Orange Line Delhi Airport Express.

  - From Rohtak Road (Bahadurgarh, Tikri, Mundka, Nagloi, Peeragarhi) to Dwarka Sector-21 metro station, Bijwasan railway station and IGI route:
    As of 2025, there is no direct buses or metro trains to Dwaraka Sector 21 metro station or upgraded greenfield Bijwasan railway station, however there are following composite routes:
    - From Peeragarhi metro station to IGI T1 (metro only route, 1 change), 50-60 minutes, ₹80:
      Green Line (Brigadier Hoshiyar Singh metro station/Pandit Shree Ram Sharma metro station-Peeragarhi metro station, 11-13 stops 23-27 minutes - same 15-17 km route on NH-9 by bus takes nearly 1 hour due to the traffic). Then, change to Magenta Line (Peeragarhi metro station-IGI T1 metro station, 11 stops 20 minutes). Note, Magenta Line's missing section from Krishna Park Extension to Peeragarhi is expected to be completed and become fully operational only by December 2026, i.e. this route will become viable only after December 2026 once the missing section is completed.
    - From Punjabi Bagh West metro station to IGI T2&T3 and Bijwasan Railway station (metro only route, 1 change), 70-100 minutes, ₹90-100:
      At Green Line Punjabi Bagh West metro station transfer to Pink Line Punjabi Bagh West metro station via short footbridge; from Pink Line Punjabi Bagh West metro station-Pink Line Durgabai Deshmukh South Campus metro station, 6 stops 19 minutes). Then, via 1 km footbridge or bus (518, 546, 794A2) change to Orange Line Airport Express (Dhaula Kuan metro station-IGI T2&T3 metro station-Dwarka Sector 21 metro station, 3 stops 12 minutes).
    - From Kirti Nagar metro station to Dwarka Sec-21 metro station/Bijwasan railway station and then to IGI T2/T3 (metro only route, 2 changes), 100-120 minutes, ₹80:
      Green Line (Pandit Shree Ram Sharma metro station-Kirti Nagar metro station, 20 stops 41 minutes). Then, 1st change to Blue Line (Kirti Nagar metro station-Dwarka Sector 21 metro station, 21 stops 42 minutes). Then, 2nd change to Orange Line Airport Express (Dwarka Sector 21 metro station-IGI Airport T2/T3 metro station, 1 stop 3 minutes).
    - From Ghevra metro station by bus to Dhansa Bus Stand metro station-Dwarka metro station-Dwarka Sector 21 metro station-IGI-T3 (bus+metro combo route, 3 changes), 100-120 minutes, ₹65:
      Take DTC Bus GL-91STL (north of Ghevra metro station at immediate north of Hiran Kudna Crossing on Delhi-Rohtak Rd to Dhansa Bus Stand, ₹5, every 30 min, 14 stops 38 minutes). Then, 1st change to Grey Line (Dhansa Bus Stand metro station-Dwarka metro station, 3 stops 8 minutes). Then, 2nd change to Blue Line (Dwarka metro station-Dwarka Sector 21 metro station, 8 stops 17 minutes). Then, 3rd change to Orange Line Airport Express (Dwarka Sector 21 metro station-IGI Airport T2/T3 metro station, 1 stop 3 minutes).

=== Buses ===
- ISBT: for long-distance buses.
  - Dwarka Inter State Bus Terminus (Dwarka ISBT), adjacent and west of "Dwarka Sector 21 metro station" is 4km away from Bijwasan railway station, construction started on 27 acres in 2022, will cater to buses from Haryana and Punjab. It is also close to Bijwasan railway station. It is 11 km west of IGI T3.
  - Gurugram Inter State Bus Terminus, announced in 2023 over 15 acres of Sihi village near Kherki Daula toll plaz where Dwarka Expressway meets Delhi-Jaipur Highway NH48, is 20 km south of Bijwasan eailway station. It will cater to the buses from Haryana, Punjab, Rajasthan and Uttar Pradesh.
- Buses to upgraded Bijwasan railway station:
  - IGI Airport: Following buses pass by the Bharthal Underpass bus stop (also called BPCL Depot or Bharat Petroleum Depot) on UER-II and then walk 600 meters north to railway station, each of these buses run every 30 minutes usually from 6:30 am to midnight.
    - DTC Bus Route 801STL (6:30 am to 11:30 pm) from IGI T2 to Bharthal Underpass is nearest bus stop.
    - DTC Bus Routes 356 STL2 (8 am to 10:30 pm), 356 STL3 (9.30 am to 6:30 pm), 717C3 (7:30 am to 11:30 pm), 773 (9 am to 8.30 pm), 773 (9 am to 7:30 pm), 792/792A (9:30 am to 12 am midnight), 801 / 801A / 801LSTL (10:23 am to 5 pm), and 7172 (6:30 am to 8:30 pm) from Mahipalpur near IGI Airport to Bijwasan Railway Station, Dwaraka Sector 21 Metro station and Bharthal Underpass, cost ₹5, between 8:30 am to 9 pm.
  - Mundka-Nagloi-Peeragarhi-IGI: Local DTC Bus Route 947 along Rohtak Road Mundka-Nagloi-Peeragarhi then to Outer Ring Road to IGI T2 four times a day.
  - Mundka via UAE-II: As of 2026 June, there are no direct buses but electric express buses will be introduced progressively before the end of 2026.
  - Bahadurgarh via UAE-II spur north of Najafgarh: As of 2026 June, there are no direct buses but electric express buses will be introduced progressively before the end of 2026.

=== Roads ===
Urban Extension Road-II Expressway (UER II) or NH-344M connects it to the Delhi-Ambala-Amritsar NH 1, Delhi–Amritsar–Katra Expressway, NH9 Delhi-Hisar (Hisar Airport 150 km west of IGI), Dwarka Expressway NH-248BB, Delhi–Gurgaon Expressway NH 48 (part of Delhi-Jaipur National Highway), and beyond to Gurgaon-Sohna Elevated Expressway, Delhi–Mumbai Expressway, Faridabad–Noida–Ghaziabad Expressway (FNG), Palwal-Jewar Airport Expressway, Eastern Peripheral Expressway (EPE), etc.

There is a plan to construct a tunnel to connect it to the IGI T3 by road.

== Present status ==
=== Phase-1 ===
- June 2026: According to railway officials, the revised target completion date is October 2026, trains from Old Delhi Railway station (station code: DLI) and Delhi Sarai Rohilla railway station (station code: DEE) will be moved to Bijwasan.

=== Phase-2 ===
- June 2026: Tender invited in June 2026 for the commercial development of land parcel between the railway and the Dwarka Sector 21 metro station.

== See also ==
- Transport in Delhi
- Transport in Haryana
- Railway in Haryana
- Delhi travel guide from Wikivoyage
- Haryana travel guide from Wikivoyage
