= List of national highways in India by union territory =

List of the new National Highway numbers (UT-wise). There are no national highways in Lakshadweep.

== Andaman and Nicobar Islands ==
| Number | Length (km) | Length (mi) | Southern or western terminus | Northern or eastern terminus | Formed | Removed | Notes |
|---|---|---|---|---|---|---|---|
| NH 4 | 330.7 | 205.5 | Chidiya Tapu | Mayabunder | — | — | |

== Chandigarh ==
| Number | Length (km) | Length (mi) | Southern or western terminus | Northern or eastern terminus | Formed | Removed | Notes |
|---|---|---|---|---|---|---|---|
| NH 5 | 15.27 | 9.49 | Chandigarh | | — | — | Old NH-22 |

== Dadra and Nagar Haveli and Daman and Diu ==
| Number | Length (km) | Length (mi) | Southern or western terminus | Northern or eastern terminus | Formed | Removed | Notes |
|---|---|---|---|---|---|---|---|
| NH 251 | 10 | 6.2 | NH-51 near Una in the State of Gujarat connecting Ghoghla- Gujarat Border | | — | — | |
| NH 848A | 31 | 19 | Dadra Border - Pipriya (Piparia) - Silvassa - Ultanfalia - Bhurkudfalia - Khadol - Surangi - Velugam in the Union Territory of Dadra Nagar Haveli and Daman and Diu / Maharashtra Border | | — | — | |
| NH 848B | 12 | 7.5 | Ambawadi- Patalia Coastal Highway- Gujarat Border | | — | — | |

== Delhi ==
| Number | Length (km) | Length (mi) | Southern or western terminus | Northern or eastern terminus | Formed | Removed | Notes |
|---|---|---|---|---|---|---|---|
| NH 9 | 26.9 | 16.7 | Delhi-Haryana Border -Delhi [except portion of ring road from Punjabi Bagh (km. 12.300 of old NH No. 10) to Nizamudin bridge ring road T junction (km. 0.00 of old NH No. 24)]- Delhi UP Border near Ghaziabad | | — | — | |
| NH 44 | 15.0 | 9.3 | Haryana Delhi Border near Kundli- Delhi [except portion of ring road from Mukarba Chowk (km 16.500 of old NH No. 1) to Ashram Chowk (km 8.300 of old NH No. 2)]- Mukarba Chowk on Outer Ring Road | | — | — | |
| NH 48 | 15.0 | 9.3 | The highway starting from its junction with NH-44 near Bankoli Village connecting Narela, Mundka, Najafgarh, Dwarka and terminating at its junction with NH-248 BB near Bhartal chowk in the NCT of Delhi. | | — | — | |
| NH 148A | 10.2 | 6.3 | junction with Rao Tula Ram Marg in Delhi (km. 14.300 of old NH No. 8)- Delhi Haryana Border | | — | — | |
| NH 148AE | 8.0 | 5.0 | Mehrauli - Andheria More - Chhatarpur T-Point - junction with NH-48 near Gurgaon in Haryana | | — | — | |
| NH 248BB | 25.7 | 16.0 | The highway starting from its junction with NH-48 near Shiv Murti (Rangpuri) and terminating at its junction with Nelson Mandela Marg near Vasant Kunj in the NCT of Delhi. | | — | — | |
| NH 344M | 9.9 | 6.2 | Junction with NH No. 48 near Shiv Murti - Bharthal Chowk, Delhi/Haryana border in the Union Territory of National Capital Territory of Delhi - Kherki Daula on NH-48 in the State of Haryana. | | — | — | |

== Jammu and Kashmir ==
| Number | Length (km) | Length (mi) | Southern or western terminus | Northern or eastern terminus | Formed | Removed | Notes |
|---|---|---|---|---|---|---|---|
| NH 1 | 422 | 262 | Srinagar | Leh | — | — | |
| NH 44 | 541 | 336 | Punjab Border - Kathua - Samba - Jammu - Udhampur - Batot - Ramban - Khanabal - Awantipur - Pampore - Srinagar | | — | — | |
| NH 144 | 90 | 56 | Domel | Bhambla | — | — | |
| NH 144A | 230 | 140 | Jammu | Poonch | — | — | |
| NH 244 | 274 | 170 | Near Chenani junction (NH-44)-Sudh Mahadev-Goha-Khelani-Kishtwar-Sinthan Pass-Near (Khanabal (NH-44) | | — | — | |
| NH 244A | 57.2 | 35.5 | From NH-44 near Jammu, terminating at its junction with NH-44 (Nagrota Bypass) in the union territory of Jammu and Kashmir (Jammu Ring Road). | | — | — | |
| NH 444 | 150 | 93 | Srinagar | Qazigund | — | — | |
| NH 501 | 90 | 56 | Panchtarni | Khanabal | — | — | |
| NH 701 | 126 | 78 | Baramula | Tangdhar | — | — | |
| NH 701A | 39 | 24 | Baramula | Gulmarg | — | — | |

== Ladakh ==
| Number | Length (km) | Length (mi) | Southern or western terminus | Northern or eastern terminus | Formed | Removed | Notes |
|---|---|---|---|---|---|---|---|
| NH 1 | 422 | 262 | Srinagar | Leh | — | — | |
| NH 3 | 170 | 110 | Himachal Pradesh Border | Leh | — | — | |
| NH 301 | 234 | 145 | Kargil | Zanskar Road | — | — | |

== Puducherry ==
| Number | Length (km) | Length (mi) | Southern or western terminus | Northern or eastern terminus | Formed | Removed | Notes |
|---|---|---|---|---|---|---|---|
| NH 32 | 5.6 | 3.5 | Tindivanam, Pondicherry, Cuddalore, Chidambaram, Karaikal | | — | — | |
| NH 332 | 21.3 | 13.2 | Junction with NH-32 near Pondicherry and terminating at its junction with NH-38 near Viluppuram | | — | — | |

== See also ==
- List of national highways in India
- List of national highways in India by state
