= Worldmark Aerocity =

Indian real estate project

- Location: Aerocity, New Delhi, India
- Status: Phase 1 complete, Phase 2 under construction
- Groundbreaking: 2019
- Estimated completion: 2027
- Use: Mixed use: offices, retail, restaurants
- Website: bhartirealestate.com

Companies
- Architect: PLP Architecture, ARCOP Associates and Benoy
- Developer: Bharti Realty Ltd

Technical details
- Buildings: Worldmark 1, Worldmark 2, Worldmark 3, Worldmark 4, Worldmark 5, Worldmark 6, Worldmark 7
- Leasable area: 7,000,000 square feet (650,000 m^{2})

Worldmark Aerocity is a mixed used real estate project located in New Delhi, India. Phase 1 of the project includes 3 towers which are complete. Phase 2 which includes 4 more towers and India’s largest shopping mall is currently under construction and is expected to be completed in 2027.

== History ==
In 2019, Bharti Realty won development rights next to Delhi airport in the aerocity area next to the Indira Gandhi International Airport.

== Funding ==
Brookfield India Real Estate Trust (BIRET) acquired Bharti's 50% stake in four properties, including Worldmark Aerocity in 2024. As a part of this deal, Bharti got an 8.53% stake in BIRET as consideration for the sale. The deal also gives BIRET a first right of refusal on the balance 50% stake after April 2026.

== Phased expansion ==
- Worldmark-1-2-3: The Worldmark project by Bharti Realty at the site is roughly a 1.4 million sq ft office, plus retail project spread across several towers, Worldmark 1, 2 and 3 spread over 7.6 acres.
  - Worldmark-1 - operational: Worldmark-1 comprises around 900,000 sq ft office space, tenants include Ernst & Young, Airbus, Goods and Service Tax Network, Credit Agricole and Industrial Bank of Korea. Bharti Realty has set up a 50,000 sq. ft. food court called Food Capital, which has restaurants and outlets including international chains Subway and Pizza Hut as well as outlets of local chains Bikanervala and Karim's.
  - Worldmark-2 complete in 2025.
  - Worldmark-3 completion in 2027.
- Worldmark-4-5-6-7: Bharti Real Estate announced the expansion of Worldmark in 2022. This phase comprising Worldmark 4, 5, 6 and 7 together form the commercial precinct with approximately 3.5 million sq. ft. of office space and about 3 million sq. ft. of retail space spread over 40 acres. This will include India’s largest shopping mall and is expected to be completed in 2027. This development is part of a $2.5 billion expansion project called Worldmark Aerocity. The project has been dubbed as India's first aerotropolis. It will feature high-street experiences, luxury and mid segment brands, a food court, a 10-screen multiplex, a banquet hall, and an indoor entertainment center.
  - Worldmark-4 completion in TBD.
  - Worldmark-5 completion in TBD.
  - Worldmark-6 completion in TBD.
  - Worldmark-6 completion in TBD.

== Connectivity ==
- Airport
  - IGI Delhi Airport: Worldmark sits between T1 and T2/T3.
- Rail
  - Delhi Metro Orange Airport Express Line has Delhi Aerocity metro station and IGI Airport metro station T2/T3.
  - Delhi Metro Gold Line has Delhi Aerocity metro station and Terminal 1 IGI Airport metro station.
  - Delhi–Alwar RRTS will have station at Aerocity
  - Bijwasan railway station is few km west and 2 metro stations away by Delhi Metro Orange Line.
- Bus
  - Aerocity ISBT is planned to be built next to Delhi Aerocity metro station.

== Present status ==
- 2025 Oct: Worldmark-1 is already operational, Worldmark-2 is nearing completion, Worldmark Mall-3 completion is scheduled for 2027, Worldmark Mall-4 completion is scheduled for 2032.

== See also ==
- Haryana Orbital Rail Corridor
- Hindon Airport
- Noida Airport
- Hisar Airport
