= Delhi Aerocity metro station =

Metro station in Delhi, India

Delhi Aerocity

General information
- Location: Aerocity, Indira Gandhi International Airport, New Delhi,110037
- Coordinates: 28°32′57″N 77°07′15″E
- System: Delhi Metro station
- Owner: Delhi Metro
- Line: Airport Express Golden Line
- Platforms: Island platform; Platform-1 → Yashobhoomi Dwarka Sector - 25; Platform-2 → New Delhi
- Tracks: 2

Construction
- Structure type: Underground
- Platform levels: 2
- Accessible: Yes

Other information
- Station code: DACY

History
- Opened: 15 August 2011; 15 years ago
- Electrified: 25 kV 50 Hz AC through overhead catenary

Services
Preceding station	Delhi Metro	Following station
IGI Airport towards Yashobhoomi Dwarka Sector - 25	Airport Express	Dhaula Kuan towards New Delhi
Future service
Terminal 1 IGI Airport Terminus	Golden Line	Mahipalpur towards Kalindi Kunj
Route map
Location

The Delhi Aerocity metro station is located on the Delhi Airport Express Line of the Delhi Metro. This station is located near the National Highway 8. While the Airport Express Line was opened on 23 February 2011, this station was not opened to the public until Independence Day, Monday 15 August 2011, to allow a buildup of demand.

The metro station was constructed to connect Delhi Metro with Aerocity, a part of Indira Gandhi International Airport, ultimately housing 16 luxury hotels and commercial spaces. It was conceived and approved as a part of the Delhi Airport master plan. The hospitality district of Aerocity offers quick access to the airport, besides being centrally located between the business areas of Delhi and Gurgaon.

The station is within walking distance to Mahipalpur, New Delhi, situated at Delhi–Gurgaon border.

Entrance to Delhi Aerocity metro station

== Station layout ==
G	Street level	Exit/Entrance
C	Concourse	Fare control, station agent, Ticket/token, shops
P	Platform 2 South West bound	Towards → New Delhi; Next Station: Dhaula Kuan Change at the next station for Durgabai Deshmukh South Campus metro station under Pink Line
P	Island platform | Doors will open on the right
P	Platform 1 Northbound	Towards ← Yashobhoomi Dwarka Sector - 25; Next Station: IGI Airport

== Business area ==
- Worldmark Aerocity, adjacent to the Aerocity metro station

== Connectivity ==
Delhi Aerocity metro station is the main interconnectivity hub for the IGI on Yellow Line (operational) and Golden Line (expected completion by March 2026), with the existing NH48 and existing Dwarka Expressway next to it. Also adjacent to it are the proposed Aerocity ISBT (west of the Aerocity metro station), underground Delhi Aerocity RRTS (expected completion by December 2024, east of the Aerocity metro station) on Delhi–Alwar Regional Rapid Transit System, proposed at-grade IGI Automatic People Mover (APM) light rail for moving passengers between various terminals within the restricted area, and under-construction Aerocity Passenger Transport Centre (PTC) (east of the Aerocity metro station) for connectivity via autorickshaw, ride hailing bikes and cars, etc. The upgraded Bijwasan railway station (expected completion by December 2024) is adjacent to the Dwarka Sector 21 metro interchange station on Orange and Blue Line, and Bijwasan railway station will connect to the Haryana Orbital Rail Corridor (expected completion by March 2025) via the Patli railway station in the south.

- National Highway 48 (India) (NH48), existing NH48 passes by the Delhi Aerocity metro station.
- Dwarka Expressway, existing expressway operational since 2024.
- Aerocity Inter State Bus Terminus (Aerocity ISBT), proposed in 2023 adjacent to the Aerocity metro station.
- Golden Line (Delhi Metro) Aerocity metro station, under construction and expected to be completed by March 2026, will connect IGI T1 with Tughlakabad metro station via the Delhi Aerocity metro station.
- Delhi Aerocity RRTS on Delhi–Alwar Regional Rapid Transit System, under construction and expected to be completed by December 2024, will have an interconnected station adjacent to the Delhi Aerocity metro station.
- IGI Automatic People Mover (IGI APM), a light rail for moving passengers between various terminals within the restricted area.
- Aerocity Passenger Transport Centre (PTC), under construction for connectivity via auto, cab and bike rides, etc.
- Dwarka Sector 21 metro station will become an interchange of Orange and Blue Line. Kirti Nagar to Bamnoli Metrolite, proposed light metro, will interchange at IICC - Dwarka Sector 25 metro station for connectivity to the airport. Bamnoli will also be connected further south to Rapid Metro Gurgaon (at Rezang La Chowk in Palam Vihar) via the existing IICC - Dwarka Sector 25 metro station (India International Convention and Expo Centre).
- Bijwasan railway station adjacent to the Dwarka Sector 21 metro station.

== See also ==
- List of Delhi Metro stations
- Transport in Delhi
- Delhi Metro Rail Corporation
- Delhi Suburban Railway
