= Kishangarh Village =

- Village
- Location in Delhi, India
- Coordinates: 28°31′07″N 77°10′03″E
- Country: India
- State: Delhi

Government
  - Body: South Delhi Municipal Corporation (068-S)

Languages
  - Official: Hindi, Khadiboli and English
- Time zone: UTC+5:30 (IST)
- PIN: 110070
- Nearest city: Gurgaon
- Lok Sabha constituency: South West Delhi
- Civic agency: South Delhi Municipal Corporation (068-S)

Kishangarh is an Urban village. The Village is located near Vasant Kunj in South West Delhi district of Delhi, India, on the hills of Aravali, between Mehrauli and Vasant Kunj. One extreme of Kishangarh is around 4 km from Qutub Minar in historic Mehrauli area. The other extreme is approximately 7.5 km from the Indira Gandhi International Airport. Munirka is about 5 km, where the Aruna Asaf Ali Marg, connecting the main Vasant Kunj Marg with the Outer Ring Road forms its western boundary.

Kishangarh comes under South Delhi Municipal Corporation (SDMC) Mehrauli (Ward Name), 068-S (Ward Number). and the Mehrauli and there is no panchayat system in the village

Districts of Delhi

== Geography and climate ==
Kishangarh lies in the South West district of Delhi and, like the rest of the city, has a semi-arid climate with a significant difference between summer and winter temperatures. While the summer temperatures may go up to 46 °C, the winters can seem freezing to people used to a warm climate with near 2.5 °C.

The soil of Kishangarh Jat consists of sandy loam to loam texture. The water level has gone down in the recent past hovering between 45 m to 50 m due to rise in population.

== Public Transport ==
Nearest Metro Station :

- Chhatarpur (Delhi Metro) Station on Yellow Line.

Delhi Transport Corporation (DTC) buses which pass from Kishangarh are:

- 539 (Mehrauli - Nangloi)
- 604 (Chhatarpur (Delhi Metro) Station - New Delhi railway station)
- 605 (Mori Gate - Vasant Kunj Sector C-9)
- 714 (Badarpur, Delhi M.B Road - Rajokri Harijan basti)
- 715 (Mehrauli - Mangla Puri)
- 717 (Badarpur, Delhi M.B Road - Shahabad Mohammadpur SMDP)

== Accessibility ==
Kishangarh was largely considered to be a place cut off from the main city, but in recent years saw rapid progress in this aspect with the Delhi Metro coming to close by Chattarpur and more bus routes added to the area by DTC. The transit to Delhi Metro station has also become easier via Metro feeder buses available at regular intervals.

The distance between Kishangarh Village and some prominent areas within the NCT of Delhi/New Delhi are as follows: -

- Kishangarh - Qutub Minar : 4 km
- Kishangarh - IGI Airport Terminal 7.5 km
- Kishangarh - Dwarka Sub City : 11 km
- Kishangarh - Chittaranjan Park : 13 km
- Kishangarh - AIIMS : 14 km
- Kishangarh - Lajpat Nagar : 16 km
- Kishangarh - Connaught Place : 17 km
- Kishangarh - Rajouri Garden : 18 km
- Kishangarh - Nizamuddin Railway Station : 20 km
- Kishangarh - New Delhi Railway Station : 23 km
- Kishangarh - Kashmere Gate : 25 km
- Kishangarh - Delhi University : 27 km
- Kishangarh - Rohini Sub City : 30 km
- Kishangarh - Delhi Singhu Border : 48 km
- Kishangarh - Bawana : 50 km

The distance between Kishangarh Village and some prominent areas in the Delhi NCR region are as follows: -

- Kishangarh - Gurgaon : 15 km
- Kishangarh - Noida : 27 km
- Kishangarh - Faridabad : 33 km
- Kishangarh - Ghaziabad : 46 km
- Kishangarh - Greater Noida : 57 km

The nearest metro station is at Chattarpur, situated at Andheria More on the arterial Mehrauli-Gurgaon Road which connects South West Delhi to the suburban area of Gurgaon.

== Areas Near Kishangarh Village ==
- Mehrauli
- Vasant Kunj
- Vasant Vihar
- Munirka
- Saket
- Mahipalpur
- Masoodpur

== See also ==
- South West Delhi district
- South Delhi district
- West Delhi district
- Areas And Zones of New Delhi
