= Dwarka Expressway =

Expressway in Delhi and Haryana, India

Dwarka Expressway (NH 248-BB)
- Dwarka Expressway
- Dwarka Expressway in red
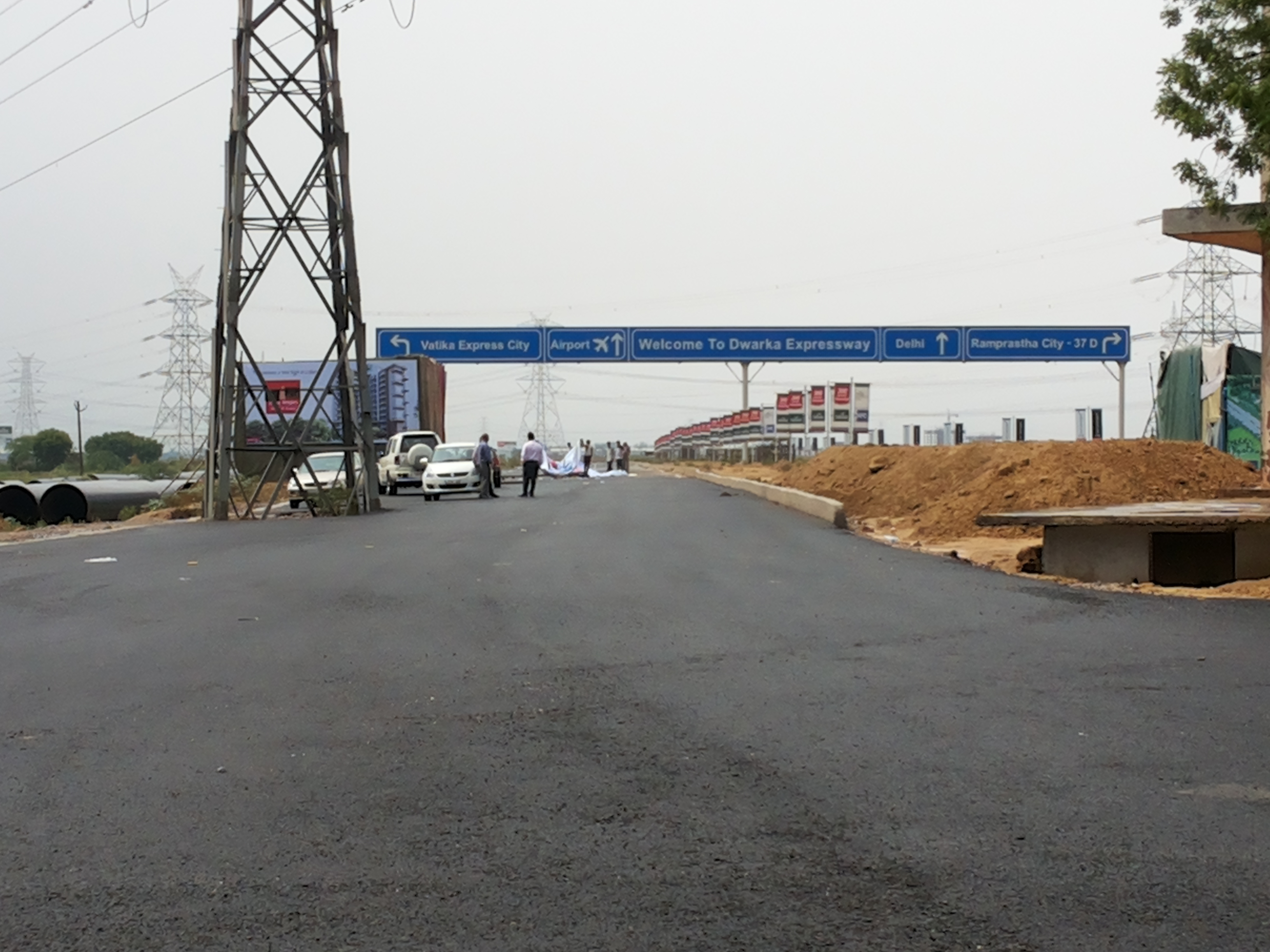

Route information
- Auxiliary route of NH 48
- Length: 27.6 km (17.1 mi)
- Existed: 1 April 2011–present

Major junctions
- From: NH 48 in Shiv Murti, Mahipalpur, Delhi
- NH 344M in Yashobhoomi, Delhi; NH 352W in Harsaru, Haryana
- To: NH 48 in Kherki Daula Toll Plaza, Gurugram

Location
- Country: India
- States: Delhi, Haryana

Highway system
- Roads in India; Expressways; National; State; Asian
← NH 248A	→ NH 348

NH 248-BB, also known as Dwarka Expressway, is an existing 27.6 km (17.1 mi) long operational, 16-lane, including 8-lane elevated grade separated and 8-lane service road, expressway connecting Dwarka in Delhi to Kherki Daula Toll Plaza at Gurgaon in Haryana. The expressway takes off from km 20 milestone of NH-48 at Shiv Murti in Mahipalpur adjacent to the IGI Airport in Delhi and terminate at km 40 of NH-48 near Kherki Daula Toll Plaza in Gurgaon in Haryana. The Dwarka Expressway serves as an alternate road link between Delhi and Gurgaon to ease the traffic congestion on the Delhi–Gurgaon Expressway section of NH-48. The Dwarka Expressway corridor has seen rapid residential and commercial development in recent years, especially in sectors of Gurgaon such as 83, 84, 85, and 86.

== History ==
=== Conception ===
The entire project, costing ₹7,500 crore, began being planned in 2006. After the land acquisition started in 2007-08, the expressway was established when the construction contract was awarded to JSR Construction Private Ltd and India Bulls Private Ltd on 1 April 2011, with a scheduled completion date of 31 March 2012. Contract was awarded in 2011 and 14 km out of the original 18 route were completed by 2016. Several more kilometre project routes was added to the scope of the project as an extension, by altering the originally planned route to the current alignment.

Land acquisition issues delayed the project for several years. After the Punjab and Haryana High Court disposed of the petitions by the land owners in May 2015, the partially completed project was acquired by National Highways Authority of India and road was renamed National Highway 248-BB in June 2016, and the scope of the project was expanded by including the proposed Central Peripheral Road (CPR) and 6.3 km long section of Urban Extension Road-II (UER II) as part of the expressway. But construction couldn't be started immediately as HUDA was not able to hand over land to NHAI due to the matter of allotment of alternate plots to oustees being heard in Punjab and Haryana High Court. On 28 May 2018, the High Court directed HUDA to allot alternate houses to 72 oustees, holding General Power of Attorney or Special Power of Attorney, within two weeks and thus allowing the authority to demolish remaining houses and hand over the land to NHAI. Still, various parts of the project remained delayed due to land acquisition and tree transplantation hurdles, resulting in the intervention from the Prime Minister's office in November 2018 to resolve the pending issues, and all the land related issues were resolved within 2018.

Having resolved the land issues, on 8 March 2019 Union Minister Nitin Gadkari laid the foundation stone having already awarded most of the construction contracts. In March 2024, Prime Minister Narendra Modi inaugurated the partially-completed 18.9 km stretch in Haryana, and the entire route of the completed expressway became operational in June 2025.

=== Construction ===
Construction packages awarded, from north to south, are as follows:

- Package 1 - in Delhi: Mahipalpur Shiv Murti cloverleaf interchange to Bijwasan railway station underpass, 5.3km including 3.6 km deep tunnel:
  This stretch starts from Shiv Murti at NH48 and ends at the Bijwasan Rail Underbridge near Dwarka Sector 21. 3.5 km of this is a deep tunnel running under the runway costing INR1000 crore.
- Package 2 - in Delhi: Bijwasan rail underpass to Delhi–Haryana border, 4.2 km elevated: from km 5.3 at the Bijwasan rail underbridge till km 9.5 at the Delhi–Haryana border on the expressway.
- Package 3 - in Gurugram: Delhi–Haryana border to approach of Basai railway overbridge, 10.2 km elevated:
  It passes through Sectors 102, 103, 104, 105, 106, 109, 110, 111, 112 and 113 in Gurugram and has been constructed as an elevated dual carriageway of 4 lanes each. Another 4-lane dual carriage way of the service roads run beneath the main carriageway.
- Package 4 - in Gurugram: Basai rail overbridge to Kherki Daula Toll Plaza, 8.77 km elevated, cost INR 1,333 crore:
  From Rail over Bridge at Basai to the cloverleaf interchange near Kherki Daula will be constructed on EPC Mode at a cost of ₹1,047.007 crore by M/s Larsen and Toubro Ltd. The project consists of an 8-lane elevated structure for the main carriageway of Dwarka Expressway, Trumpet Interchange for Manesar Road and Cloverleaf interchange with NH-8-SPR intersection. The completion period of the project is two years with a maintenance period of four years. Under the project, a minor bridge will be widened, additional ROBs, five VUP, six Bus Bays with Bus Shelter will be erected and four Junction Improvements will be carried out.
- Package 5 - in Delhi: Mahipalpur Shiv Murti to IGI Airport T3 Tunnel (also called Delhi Airport Tunnel Expressway), 2.3 km shallow tunnel to T3:
  An east-to-west running new INR350 crore 4-lane shallow 2.3 km tunnel as part of Dwarka Expressway from Shiv Murti to Terminal 3 of Indira Gandhi International Airport.

== Route ==
=== Existing ===
The route alignment to the west of Gurgaon is as follows:

- In Delhi
  - Mahipalpur, commences at Shiv Murti on 20 km milestone of NH 48
  - Along Indira Gandhi International Airport southern perimeter
  - Under Delhi–Rewari railway line near new terminus of Bijwasan railway station
  - Dwarka Sectors 21, 22, 25, 27, 28
  - Najafgarh-Bijwasan Road
- In Haryana
  - Bajghera village in Gurgaon
  - Road bridge over Delhi-Rewari railway line at Sectors 99 x 37D in Gurgaon
  - National Highway 352W (Pataudi Road) near Harsaru in Gurgaon
  - Kherki Daula Toll Plaza, terminates here to Delhi–Mumbai Expressway and Southern Peripheral Road (Ghata-Kherki Daula 16 km route to east of Gurugram)

=== Planned extensions ===
- Shiv Murti-Vasant Kunj Tunnel (Rangpuri Bypass Expressway): 6-lane expressway from Shiv Murti on Dwarka Expressway & NH-48 intersection to Nelson Mandela Marg in Vasant Kunj with interchanges at Andheria Mor and NH148A Anuvrat Marg-Mehraul intersection, then Mehrauli to Badarpur at NH19.
- Shiv Murti-Sarai Kale Khan Tunnel: The northern end of the tunnel at Mahipalpur in Delhi from the existing Shiv Murti is planned to be extended another 18 to 20 km to Sarai Kale Khan multi-model transport hub where the bus station, suburban metro, NCR regional RRTS, long-distance national rail, etc are co-located (June 2025 update).

== Related connectivity ==
=== Existing connectivity ===
- Northern end of Dwarka Expressway in Delhi: connects to the UER II (NH-344M), IGI Airport, Delhi–Gurgaon Expressway (part of NH-48), and Delhi Metro NCR suburban rail.
- Southern end of Dwarka Expressway in Gurugram: connects to the NH-48 which in turn connects to the Western Peripheral Expressway (WPE), RRTS Delhi NCR regional rail, and Kherki Daula ISBT bus terminal. The WPE in turn connects to the Haryana Orbital Rail Corridor, Eastern Peripheral Expressway (EPE), Delhi–Mumbai Expressway, Delhi–Amritsar–Katra Expressway, Delhi–Faridabad Skyway and DND Flyway.

=== Future connectivity ===
- 11 Murti-INA-Vasant Kunj-Bandhwari-Gurugram Elevated Highway: The route from 11 Murti Circle (on Mother Teresa Crescent), to INA Colony and Nelson Mandela Marg in Vasant Kunj in New Delhi to Gurugram-Faridabad Road (Bandhwari and Ghata) will be upgraded to the elevated expressway. In addition to the existing NH-48 and Dwarka Expressway, it will serve as the third major highway between Delhi and Gurugram.
- Delhi–Jaipur Super Expressway (NH-352B), is a greenfield expressway which is under construction of ₹6,530 crore 6-lane 195-km-long from Kherki Daula (from Dwarka Expressway in Gurgaon) to Chandwaji (on NH-48 on northern outskirts of Jaipur) runs parallel to western side of NH48. It cuts down Delhi–Jaipur distance by 40 km and travel time from 3–4 hours (270 km by Delhi–Mumbai Expressway) to 2 hours. It passes through Haryana (Kherki Daula, Farrukhnagar, Pataudi, Taoru, Rewari, north of Bawal, Jhajhar & Nangal Choudhary) and Rajasthan (Behror, Kotputli, Shahpura & Chandwaji). In April 2023, the earthworks had already started and expected completion date is 2025.
- Gurugram Heli Hub: In FY2025-26 Haryana Budget, funds were allocated to develop 16-acre heliport off Dwarka Expressway in Sector 84 near Global Cit, which will provide direct helicopter rides to IGI Delhi Airport, Salasar Balaji Temple, Khatu Shyam Temple, Pitambari Mata Temple Pehowa, Chandigarh, and other regions.

== Current status ==
- June 2025: The entire route of the expressway, from Kherki Daula to Shiv Murti at Mahipalpur, was completed and made operational in June 2025. There is plan to further extend this route by building 18 to 20 km long tunnel from Shiv Murti to Serai Kale Khan multi-model transport hub.

== See also ==
- Expressways of India
- List of highways in Haryana
