= Masoodpur =

Masoodpur is an urban village of located near Vasant Kunj in the South West Delhi district of Delhi, India, on the hills of the Aravalli Range between Mehrauli and Mahipalpur. One extreme of Masoodpur is around 10 km from Qutub Minar in historic Mehrauli. The other extreme is approximately 5.5 km from the Indira Gandhi International Airport. The nearest Delhi metro station is in Chhatarpur.

== Geography and climate ==
Masoodpur lies in the south-west district of Delhi at 28°54′01″N 77°15′71″E. Like the rest of Delhi, Masoodpur has a semi-arid climate with high variation between summer and winter temperatures. While the summer temperatures may go up to 46 °C, the winters can seem freezing to people used to a warm climate with near 2.5 °C. The soil of Masoodpur consists of sandy loam to loam. The water level has gone down recently, hovering between 150 m to 200.22 m due to increased population.
