= Dhaula Kuan metro station =

Metro station in Delhi, India

Dhaula Kuan

General information
- Location: Dhaula Kuan, New Delhi
- Coordinates: 28°35′31″N 77°09′42″E
- System: Delhi Metro station
- Owner: Delhi Metro
- Line: Airport Express
- Platforms: Side platform; Platform-1 → Yashobhoomi Dwarka Sector - 25; Platform-2 → New Delhi
- Tracks: 2
- Connections: Pink Line Durgabai Deshmukh South Campus

Construction
- Structure type: Elevated
- Platform levels: 2
- Parking: Available
- Accessible: Yes

Other information
- Station code: DKV

History
- Opened: 15 August 2011; 15 years ago
- Electrified: 25 kV 50 Hz AC through overhead catenary

Services
Preceding station	Delhi Metro	Following station
Delhi Aerocity towards Yashobhoomi Dwarka Sector - 25	Airport Express	Shivaji Stadium towards New Delhi
Delhi Cantonment towards Maujpur - Babarpur	Pink Line transfer at Durgabai Deshmukh South Campus	Sir Vishweshwaraiah Moti Bagh towards Shiv Vihar
Route map
Location

Dhaula Kuan is an elevated metro station on the Airport Express Line of the Delhi Metro. It is the only elevated station on the line and was designed to provide city airport check-in facilities for airline passengers.

The station did not commence operations when the Airport Express Line opened on 23 February 2011. Initially, trains passed through without stopping. It was opened to passengers on 15 August 2011, along with Delhi Aerocity station, completing the operationalisation of all six stations on the corridor. In October 2011, Air India introduced check-in facilities at the station, allowing passengers to obtain boarding passes, although baggage drop was not available.

As part of Phase III of the Delhi Metro expansion, Durgabai Deshmukh South Campus station was constructed on the Pink Line. To provide an interchange with Dhaula Kuan station on the Airport Express Line, a 1.2 km (0.75 mi) long foot overbridge (FOB) connecting the two stations was opened to the public on 9 February 2019. The skywalk features 22 travelators, installed to facilitate passenger movement between the stations, particularly for commuters carrying luggage.

== Station layout ==
L2	Side platform | Doors will open on the left
L2	Platform 2 Northbound	Towards → New Delhi; Next Station: Shivaji Stadium
L2	Platform 1 South West bound	Towards ← Yashobhoomi Dwarka Sector - 25; Next Station: Delhi Aerocity
L2	Side platform | Doors will open on the left
L1	Concourse	Fare control, station agent, Metro Card vending machines, crossover
G	Street Level	Exit/Entrance

== Entry/Exit ==
Dhaula Kuan metro station Entry/exits
Gate No-1	Gate No-2
Jheel Park	National Highway 8

== See also ==
- List of Delhi Metro stations
- Transport in Delhi
- Delhi Metro Rail Corporation
- Delhi Suburban Railway
