= SJSU (disambiguation) =

SJSU most commonly refers to San Jose State University, a public research university in San Jose, California, United States

It may also refer to:

- São Marcus Farm Aerodrome, (ICAO code SJSU) in Alto Paraíso, Brail
- Shivaji Stadium metro station, (station code SJSU) in New Delhi, India
