= IGI Airport metro station =

Metro station in Delhi, India

IGI Airport

- Entrance of the IGI Airport metro station

General information
- Coordinates: 28.5571°N 77.0867°E
- System: Delhi Metro station
- Line: Airport Express
- Platforms: Island platform; Platform-2 → Yashobhoomi Dwarka Sector - 25; Platform-3 → New Delhi
- Tracks: 2

Construction
- Structure type: Underground
- Accessible: Yes

Other information
- Station code: APOT

History
- Opened: 23 February 2011; 15 years ago

Services
Preceding station	Delhi Metro	Following station
Dwarka Sector 21 towards Yashobhoomi Dwarka Sector - 25	Airport Express	Delhi Aerocity towards New Delhi
Route map
Location

The IGI Airport metro station is located on the Delhi Airport Express Line of the Delhi Metro. This station is linked to the Indira Gandhi International Airport terminal 2 and 3. The station was inaugurated on 23 February 2011.

== Alternate rail access to the airport ==
The closest Indian Railways station is Shahabad Mohammadpur (SMDP). Also within distance is Palam Railway Station (PM).

== See also ==
- Terminal 1-IGI Airport metro station
- Hyderabad Airport Metro Express
- Chennai International Airport metro station
