= Bharat Vandana Park =

City park in Delhi

Coordinates: 28°34′14″N 77°03′30″E

- Interactive map of Bharat Vandana Park
- Type: Urban park
- Location: Dwarka, Delhi, India
- Area: 220 acres (89 ha; 0.34 mi^{2}; 0.89 km^{2})
- Designer: Arcop Associates
- Owner: Delhi Development Authority
- Status: Under-construction

Bharat Vandana Park is a 220-acre park currently under-construction in Delhi, India.

== Overview ==
The park's foundation was laid on 18 December 2019 by Union Home Minister Amit Shah. It is inspired by the presence of public spaces in ancient Harappan cities. As per the plan, the park was supposed to open to the public in March 2022; however, it has been delayed until August 2025. The delay was caused by the pandemic and later by an injunction from the Delhi government’s forest and wildlife department, which found that trees were being cut down 'illegally.

== Design ==
It is designed by the architectural firm ARCOP Associates and is based on the layout of traditional Rangoli patterns fused with a flower form. The landscaped green space of the park will cover 98 acres, which accounts for 54% of the total area, in addition to nearly 26 acres occupied by waterbodies. In addition, the park will feature replicas of 36 monuments from various regions of India.

== Location ==
The park is being built in Dwarka's Sector 20, located only 300 meters from the Dwarka Sector 9 metro station and 1.5 kilometers from the Yashobhoomi.
