= Delhi Public School, Vasant Kunj =

Delhi Public School Vasant Kunj

Location
- Vasant Kunj, Sector C, Pocket 5 New Delhi; India; 28°32′15″N 77°08′54″E

Information
- Motto: service before self
- Established: 1991
- Chairman: Rear Admiral M.M. Chopra
- Principal: Deepti Vohra
- Faculty: Full time
- Colors: White, green
- Nickname: "Dipsites"
- Affiliations: Central Board of Secondary Education
- Website: www.dpsvasantkunj.com

Delhi Public School, Vasant Kunj (DPS Vasant Kunj or DPS VK) is a school located in Vasant Kunj, New Delhi, India. DPS Vasant Kunj offers academic services from Kindergarten through Grade XII. The school has a combined strength of 205 teachers at the senior and junior level, and an enrollment of four thousand students.

The students in the school are divided into six houses;

Houses
Yamuna
Chenab
Satluj
Ganges
Raavi
Jhelum

== History ==
Delhi Public School, Vasant Kunj, was established in 1991 by the Delhi Public School Society under the leadership of Vinay Kumar, running its afternoon shift in DPS Vasant Vihar. The school moved to its present campus in Vasant Kunj in 1994.

== Academics ==
Delhi Public School Vasant Kunj is affiliated with the Central Board for Secondary Education (CBSE). The school offers a common curriculum up to Grade 10, along with the option of a foreign language like French, German, Japanese and Sanskrit. In Grade 11 and Grade 12, the school requires students to choose one of three 5-subject streams: Science (with Biology or Computer Science or Economics or Fashion Studies or Informative Practices or Physical Education and Psychology), Commerce, or Humanities.

The school offers subject choices in 11th and 12th grade including legal studies, music, and dance. Apart from that students also have the option of studying maths along with humanities subjects. In 2019 it was ranked 43rd in Education Worldwide's league table of "India's Best Day Schools".

== Student life ==
=== Student clubs ===
Between 2004 and 2008, the school sent a delegation every year to Global Classrooms: Delhi Public School MUN, which was hosted by Delhi Public School, RK Puram in New Delhi. The school won the Secretary General's Award for the Best Overall Delegation at the Global Classrooms: Delhi Public School MUN in 2006, 2007 and 2008.

=== Athletics ===
The football team has won, and finished as first runners-up in several national, zonal and inter-school tournaments, including the ONGC Cup, the Inter-DPS tournament and the ESPN-Star Sports Junior Premier League. Students have represented Delhi State and India under 13 and under 14, and have been selected for India under 16 football team.

== Notable alumni ==
- Jayant Yadav, cricketer
