= Shivaji Stadium metro station =

Metro station in New Delhi, India

Shivaji Stadium

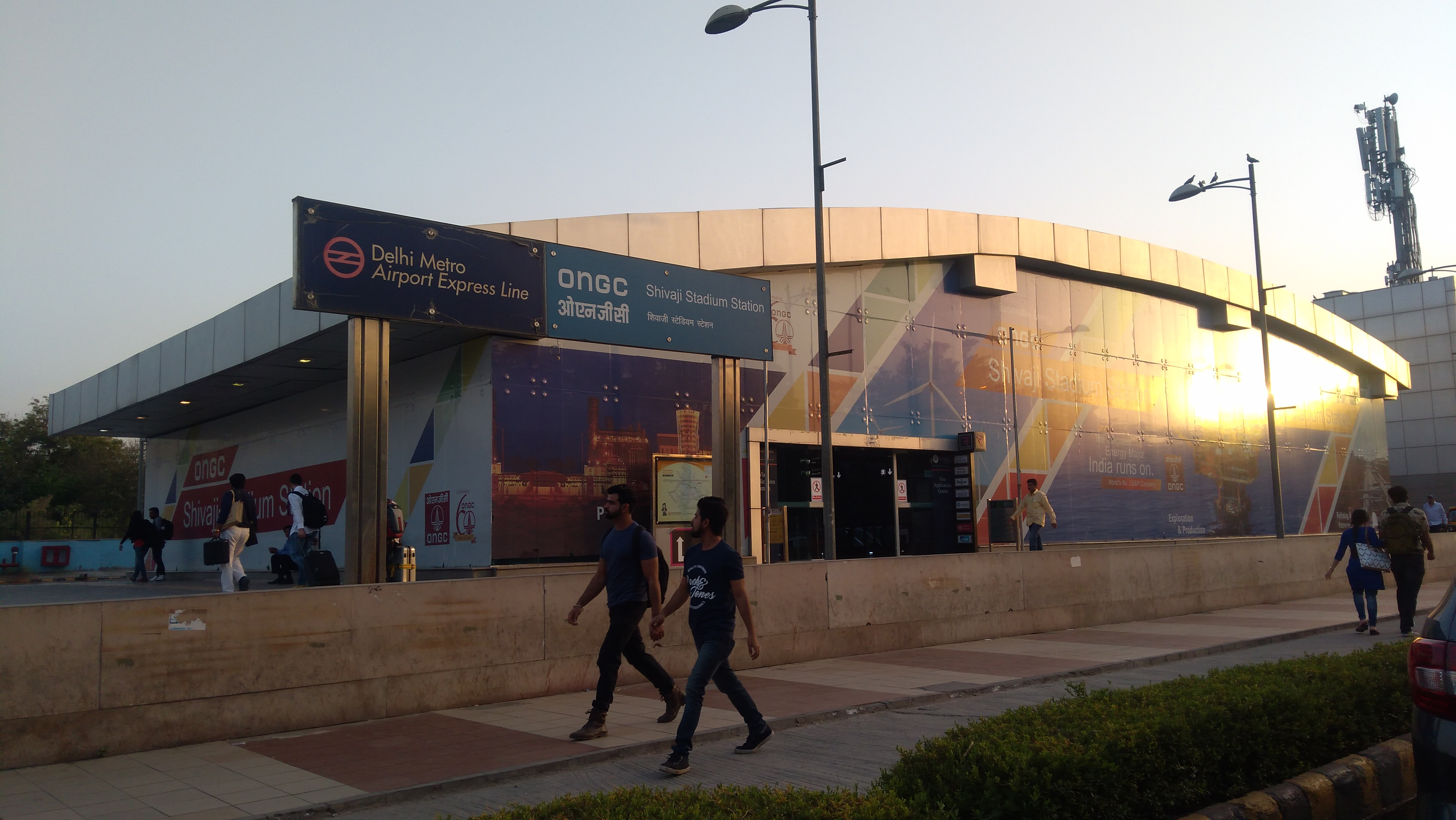
- Shivaji stadium Metro station of the Airport Express.

General information
- Location: Baba Kharak Singh Marg, Hanuman Road Area, Shivaji Stadium, Connaught Place, New Delhi, Delhi, 110001
- Coordinates: 28°37′44″N 77°12′41″E
- System: Delhi Metro station
- Owner: Delhi Metro
- Line: Airport Express Magenta Line
- Platforms: Island platform; Platform-1 → Yashobhoomi Dwarka Sector - 25; Platform-2 → New Delhi
- Tracks: 2

Construction
- Structure type: Underground
- Platform levels: 3
- Accessible: Yes

Other information
- Station code: SJSU

History
- Opened: 23 February 2011; 15 years ago
- Electrified: 25 kV 50 Hz AC through overhead catenary

Services
Preceding station	Delhi Metro	Following station
Dhaula Kuan towards Yashobhoomi Dwarka Sector - 25	Airport Express	New Delhi Terminus
Future Service
Yuge Yugeen Bharat towards Inderlok	Magenta Line	Ramakrishna Ashram Marg towards Botanical Garden
Route map
Location

The Shivaji Stadium (known as ONGC Shivaji Stadium, following a re-branding) metro station is located on the Airport Express Line of the Delhi Metro. The station opened on 23 February 2011.

== History ==
The station was opened on 23 February 2011 as Shivaji Stadium metro station. In 2015, the station was renamed to ONGC Shivaji Stadium as part of Delhi Metro's efforts to generate revenue by "semi-renaming" stations.

== Station layout ==
G	Street Level	Exit/ Entrance
C	Concourse	Fare control, station agent, Ticket/token, shops
P	Platform 2 Northbound	Towards → New Delhi; Change at the next station for Yellow Line
P	Island platform | Doors will open on the right
P	Platform 1 Southwest Bound	Towards ← Yashobhoomi Dwarka Sector - 25; Next Station: Dhaula Kuan; Change at the next station for Durgabai Deshmukh South Campus metro station under Pink Line

== See also ==
- List of Delhi Metro stations
- Transport in Delhi
- Delhi Metro Rail Corporation
- Delhi Suburban Railway
