= National Highway 848B (India) =

National highway in India

National Highway 848B
- Map of National Highway 848B in red

Route information
- Auxiliary route of NH 48
- Length: 26 km (16 mi)

Major junctions
- East end: Karembali Phatak
- West end: Udvada

Location
- Country: India
- States: Gujarat, Dadra and Nagar Haveli and Daman and Diu

Highway system
- Roads in India; Expressways; National; State; Asian
← NH 48	→ NH 48

National Highway 848B, commonly called NH 848B is a national highway in India. It is a spur road of National Highway 48. NH-848B traverses the state of Gujarat and the union territory of Dadra and Nagar Haveli and Daman and Diu in India.

== Route ==
Gujarat

Karembali Phatak, Bamanpunja, Dholar Road,

Dadra and Nagar Haveli and Daman and Diu

Ambawadi, Patalia Coastal Highway,

Gujarat

Udvada

== Junctions ==
NH 48 Terminal near Karembali Phatak.
NH 48 Terminal near Udavada.

== See also ==
- List of national highways in India
- List of national highways in India by state
