= Kherki Daula =

- Village
- Location in Haryana, India Kherki Daula (India)
- Country: India
- State: Haryana
- Region: North India
- District: Gurgaon

Languages
  - Official: Hindi
- Time zone: UTC+5:30 (IST)
- PIN: 122004
- ISO 3166 code: IN-HR
- Vehicle registration: HR-26,72
- Website: haryana.gov.in

Kherki Daula is a village in Gurgaon on National Highway 48 (India). Its Pincode is 122004. It is mainly inhabited by Ahirs (Yadav). It is opposite to Haldiram's near to second toll plaza from Delhi to Jaipur national highway and in Sector 84 of Gurgaon. This village has now become a village of rich villagers due to sale of their land in Gurgaon. The costliest real estate project "Vatika" is near to this village.

There are many companies in and around this village. Few includes Carrier Airconditiong & Refrigeration, DC Design Pvt. Ltd., Groz Engineering Tools Private Limited, Metaltech motors pvt ltd, Cosmo Carrying Pvt ltd, Stella Industries limited.

Haldiram factory and outlet is a famous attraction at Kherki Daula and Suzuki Motorcycles plant is at the outskirts of the Kherki Daula village.

This village is well connected to NH 48 and Dwarka Expressway.

== Traffic ==
Kherki Daula suffers a massive traffic jam every day as the toll plaza is located on NH48 and also of the widening of expressway. It is also the main route to connect Manesar the industrial hub of Haryana. Northern Peripheral Road also ends in Kherki Daula.
