= National Highway 244A (India) =

National highway in India

National Highway 244A

Route information
- Length: 57.21 km (35.55 mi)

Location
- Country: India
- States: Jammu and Kashmir

Highway system
- Roads in India; Expressways; National; State; Asian

National Highway 244A, commonly called NH 244A, is a national highway in the union territory of Jammu and Kashmir in India. It is a secondary route of National Highway 44.

== See also ==
- List of national highways in India
