= Golden Line (Delhi Metro) =

Future line of the metro in Delhi, India

Overview
- Other name: Line 10, Line 11
- Status: Under construction
- Owner: Delhi Metro
- Locale: Delhi
- Termini: Line 10 (Main Line): Terminal 1-IGI Airport Kalindi Kunj; Line 11 (Branch): Lajpat Nagar Saket G Block
- Stations: Line 10 (Main Line): 19; Elevated: 7 Underground: 12; Line 11 (Branch): 8 Elevated: 8

Service
- Type: Rapid transit
- System: Delhi Metro
- Operator: Delhi Metro Rail Corporation

History
- Planned opening: Line 10 (Main Line): December 2026; 1 month's time, Line 11 (Branch): Approved

Technical
- Line length: 38.17 km (23.72 mi); Line 10 (Main Line): 29.785 km (18.508 mi), Line 11 (Branch): 8.385 km (5.210 mi)
- Character: Underground and Elevated
- Track gauge: 1,435 mm (4 ft 8 1/2 in) standard gauge
- Electrification: 25 kV 50 Hz AC from overhead catenary

The Golden Line (Line 10 and Line 11) is a rapid transit line of the Delhi Metro currently under construction in South Delhi. It will commence from Delhi Aerocity and terminate at Tughlakabad. Further extensions to Kalindi Kunj and Terminal 1-IGI Airport have also been approved as part of Phase 5A extension, and the works are currently underway. The main line (Line 10) will be 29.785 km (18.508 mi) long with 19 stations, comprising 7 elevated and 12 underground stations. The branch line (Line 11) will be 8.385 km (5.210 mi) long with eight stations, all of which will be elevated.

It will connect southern Delhi directly with Indira Gandhi International Airport to relieve the increasing traffic congestion and pollution prevalent on the streets of Delhi. Construction of the line began in June 2022 as part of the fourth phase of the Delhi Metro's development, and partial operations are expected to start by the end of 2026.

== History ==
The Golden Line, initially named as Silver Line, was conceptualised by the Delhi Metro Rail Corporation (DMRC) under the Phase IV of Delhi Metro's future expansion and development in July 2016. As per the plan, six new lines spanning a length of about 104 km (65 mi) were planned to be added to the metro network, out of which the Golden Line would cover southern Delhi at a length of 20.2 km (12.6 mi). The plans were finalised for implementation by the Government of Delhi in December 2018; per the implementation plan, the length of the Golden Line increased to 23.6 km (14.7 mi). In March 2019, whereafter they were approved by the Government of India. Thereafter, land acquisition for Phase IV and the Golden Line began from April 2019, and was completed in three years. Construction was supposed to begin from 2021, but was delayed due to the restrictions imposed by the government on account of the onset of the COVID-19 pandemic. In June 2022, Afcons Infrastructure and Larsen & Toubro initiated the construction. It was expected to be completed by 2024/25, which was eventually pushed to the end of 2026.

In November 2020, the DMRC changed the alignment of the Golden Line as per the instructions of the Archaeological Survey of India (ASI) to circumvent the Qutb Minar and the Mehrauli Archaeological Park, so to avoid any harm to these critical historical sites during construction and operation. As per the initial plan, the line was proposed to be extended to Terminal 1 of Indira Gandhi International Airport, in order to provide commuters a faster and direct link to the airport's premises. The proposal was approved by the Government of Delhi after the DMRC composed and outlined a Detailed Project Report (DPR) in December 2023, thereby increasing the line's length to 25.82 km (16.04 mi). The name of the line was changed from Silver to Golden in January 2024.

The operational Sarita Vihar Depot serving the Violet Line is being modified to handle trains for the Golden Line too. Trainsets began started arriving at the depot from April 2026.

== Stations ==
The stations being built on the Golden Line are:

=== Main Line (Line 10) ===
Golden Line
#	Station name		Phase	Opening	Interchange connection	Station layout	Platform level type
#	English	Hindi	Phase	Opening	Interchange connection	Station layout	Platform level type
1	Terminal 1 IGI Airport	टर्मिनल 1 आई.जी.आई एयरपोर्ट	V(A)	2028	IGI Airport (T-1); Magenta Line	Underground	Island
2	Delhi Aerocity	दिल्ली एरोसिटी	IV	2027	Airport Express	Underground	Island
3	Mahipal Pur	महिपालपुर	IV	2027	None	Underground	Side
4	Vasant Kunj	वसंत कुंज	IV	2027	None	Underground	Side
5	Kishangarh	किशनगढ़	IV	2027	None	Underground	Side
6	Chhatarpur	छत्तरपुर	IV	2027	Yellow Line	Underground	Island
7	Chhatarpur Mandir	छत्तरपुर मंदिर	IV	2027	None	Underground	Side
8	IGNOU	इग्नू	IV	2027	None	Underground	Island
9	Neb Sarai	नेब सराय	IV	2027	None	Underground	Island
10	Saket G Block	साकेत जी ब्लॉक	IV	2027	Golden Line (Branch Line) (Phase IV - Under Construction)	Elevated	Side
11	Ambedkar Nagar	अम्बेडकर नगर	IV	2027	None	Elevated	Side
12	Khanpur–Vayusenabad	ख़ानपुर–वायुसेनाबाद	IV	2027	None	Elevated	Side
13	Sangam Vihar–Tigri	संगम विहार–तिगड़ी	IV	December 2026	None	Elevated	Side
14	Anandmayee Marg Jn.	आनंदमयी मार्ग जं.	IV	December 2026	None	Underground	Side
15	Tughlakabad Railway Colony	तुग़लक़ाबाद रेलवे कॉलोनी	IV	December 2026	None	Underground	Island
16	Tughlakabad Station	तुग़लक़ाबाद स्टेशन	IV	December 2026	Violet Line Tughlakabad	Underground	Island
17	Sarita Vihar Depot	सरिता विहार डिपो	V(A)	2028	None	Elevated	Side
18	Madanpur Khadar	मदनपुर खादर	V(A)	2028	None	Elevated	Side
19	Kalindi Kunj	कालिंदी कुंज	V(A)	2028	Magenta Line	Elevated	Side

=== Branch Line (Line 11) ===
Golden Line Branch
#	Station Name		Phase	Opening	Interchange Connection	Station Layout	Platform Level Type
#	English	Hindi	Phase	Opening	Interchange Connection	Station Layout	Platform Level Type
1	Lajpat Nagar	लाजपत नगर	IV	Approved	Pink Line; Violet Line	Elevated	Side
2	Andrews Ganj	एंड्रयूज़ गंज	IV	Approved	None	Elevated	Side
3	Greater Kailash-1	ग्रेटर कैलाश-1	IV	Approved	None	Elevated	Side
4	Chirag Delhi	चिराग दिल्ली	IV	Approved	Magenta Line	Elevated	Side
5	Pushpa Bhawan	पुष्पा भवन	IV	Approved	None	Elevated	Side
6	Saket District Centre	साकेत डिस्ट्रिक्ट सेंटर	IV	Approved	None	Elevated	Side
7	Pushp Vihar	पुष्प विहार	IV	Approved	None	Elevated	Side
8	Saket G Block	साकेत जी ब्लॉक	IV	Approved	Golden Line (Phase IV - Under Construction)	Elevated	Side

== Project timeline ==
=== Main route: IGI Aerocity to Tughlakabad ===
- April 2026: 73.33% of the overall project and 78% of the civil works are complete, with 5 tunnel boring machines at work. The entirety of the main route running from Aerocity to Tughlakabad will be complete by the end of 2026.

=== Northwest extension: IGI Aerocity to IGI Airport T1 intersection with Magenta Line ===
- August 2025: For the extension spanning between the Terminal 1 IGI Airport metro station on Magenta Line and the Aerocity station located on the Airport Line, the DPR has been completed and approved. Construction is expected to be completed by 2027-28.

=== Eastwards extension: Tughlakabad to Kalindi Kunj intersection with Magenta Line ===
- February 2026: The extension running from the station currently under-construction at Tughlakabad to the existing Kalindi Kunj metro station at Magenta Line is expected to be completed by 2028.

== Train Info ==
Golden Line
Rakes	Alstom Metropolis
Train Length	3/6 coaches
Train Gauge	1,435 mm (4 ft 8 1/2 in) standard gauge
Electrification	25 kV 50 Hz AC (nominal) from overhead catenary
Train's Maximum Speed	100 km/h
Train Operation	

== See also ==
- List of Delhi Metro stations
- Transport in Delhi
- Delhi Metro Rail Corporation
- Delhi Suburban Railway
- Delhi Transport Corporation
- National Capital Region (India)
