= National Highway 344M (India) =

National highway in India

National Highway 344M

Route information
- Length: 15 km (9.3 mi)

Major junctions
- From: National Highway 44
- To: Dwarka Expressway

Location
- Country: India
- States: Delhi

Highway system
- Roads in India; Expressways; National; State; Asian

National Highway 344M, commonly called NH 344M, is a national highway in the union territory of Delhi in India. It is a secondary route of National Highway 44.

== See also ==
- List of national highways in India
