= Airport Express Line (Delhi Metro) =

Line on the Delhi Metro system

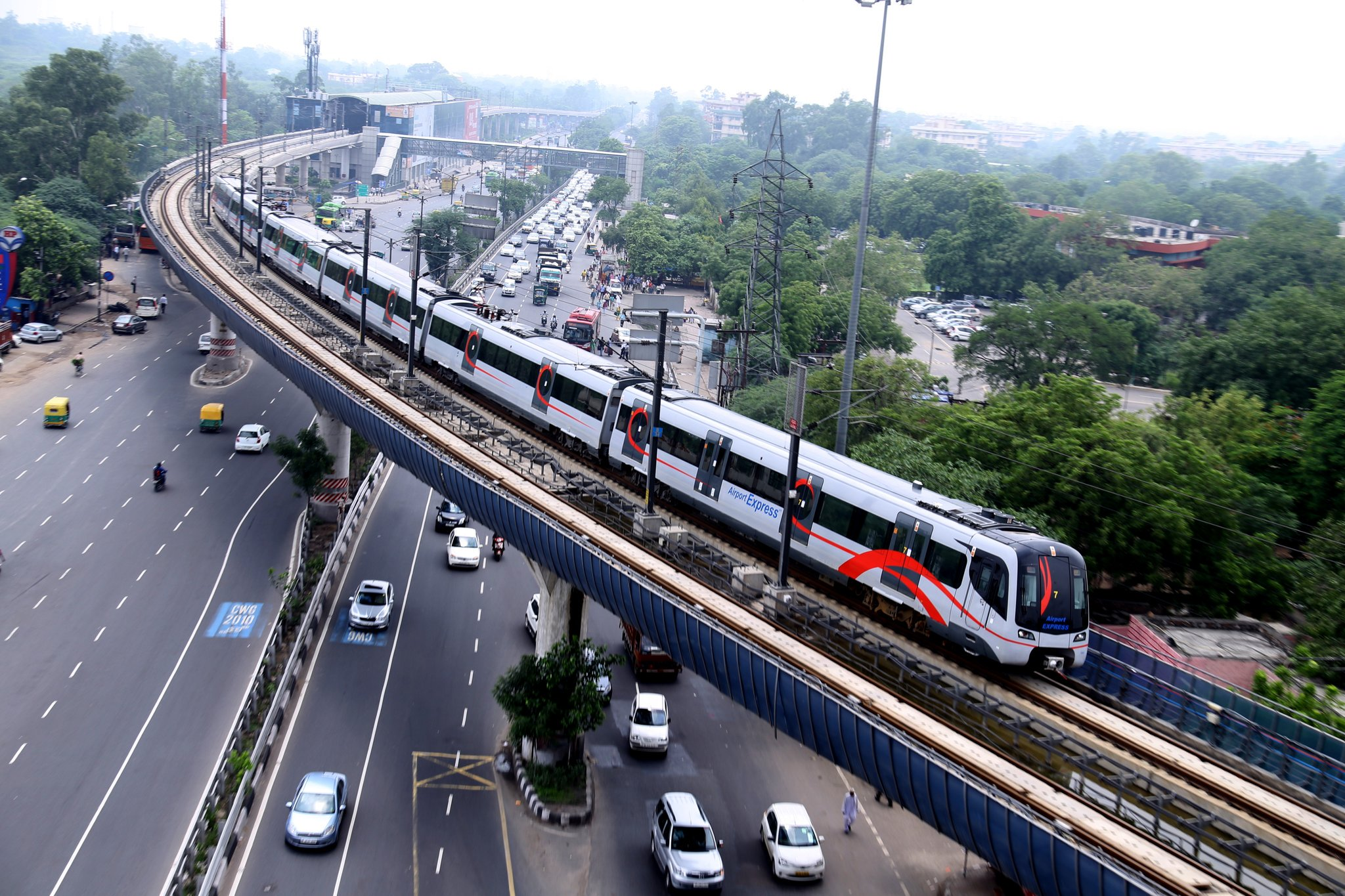
- An elevated stretch of the Airport line

Overview
- Other name: Orange Line
- Status: Operational
- Owner: Delhi Metro
- Locale: New Delhi, India
- Termini: New Delhi; Yashobhoomi Dwarka Sector - 25
- Stations: 7

Service
- Type: Airport Express Train
- System: Rapid Transit
- Operator: Delhi Metro Rail Corporation
- Rolling stock: CAF
- Daily ridership: 82,000 (Jan 2019)

History
- Opened: 23 February 2011
- Closed: 7 July 2012
- Reopened: 22 January 2013

Technical
- Line length: 22.7 km (14.1 mi)
- Character: At-grade, Underground, and Elevated
- Track gauge: 1,435 mm (4 ft 8 1/2 in) standard gauge
- Electrification: 25 kV 50 Hz AC from overhead catenary
- Operating speed: 120 km/h (75 mph)

The Airport Express Line or Orange Line is a line of the Delhi Metro that runs from New Delhi to Yashobhoomi Dwarka Sector-25, linking Indira Gandhi International Airport to the commuter network. The total length of the line is 22.7 km (14.1 mi), of which 15.7 km (9.8 mi) is underground and 7.0 km (4.3 mi) is elevated, spanning from Buddha Jayanti Park to Mahipalpur.

The line runs at a speed of 120 km/h (75 mph) providing for a 15-minute journey from New Delhi to IGI Airport. In 2023, the operational speed of the Airport Express Line was increased to 120 km/h (75 mph) from 110 km/h (68 mph), making it the fastest metro line in the country.

Previously operated by its concessionaire Reliance Infrastructure Ltd, who built the line and invested half of the capital expenditure (the other half was borne by DMRC), it notified DMRC on 27 June 2013 of its inability to operate the line beyond 30 June 2013. Following this, DMRC took over operations of Airport Express line from 1 July 2013, with an operations and maintenance team comprising 100 officials designated to handle the line.

== History ==
The first tenders for line construction were awarded in September 2007. On 23 January 2008, the DMRC awarded a 30-year build-operate-transfer PPP contract to the Reliance Energy-CAF consortium. However, DMRC paid for half of the construction cost and executed tunneling and civil works.

It was built at a cost of ₹57 billion (US$610 million), of which Reliance Infra paid ₹28.85 billion (US$310 million), Reliance Infra will also pay fees on a revenue-share model

The elevated section of the Airport Express Line was built over eight busy roads that sustain heavy volume of traffic, including the Ring Road, National Highway 48, Ridge Road and Sardar Patel Marg.

Originally scheduled to open by 31 August 2010, well in time for the 2010 Commonwealth Games, the line finally opened on 23 February 2011 at 2 PM after missing four previously set deadlines. The DMRC fined Reliance Infra ₹37.5 lakh (US$40,000) every day from 30 September, and ₹75 lakh (US$80,000) every day from 31 October for repeatedly missing the deadlines. The Aerocity and Dhaula Kuan stations opened on 15 August 2011.

Services were suspended on 8 July 2012 due to a series of technical and infrastructural problems, including cracks in the girders, the iron beams that support the tracks; dislocated bearings that support the train; defective tracks and water seepage in tunnels. The Urban Development Ministry subsequently disclosed that several clips in the underground section were seriously damaged and it would take at least 5 months to rectify the problem. A joint inspection conducted by a Delhi Metro and Reliance Infrastructure team revealed that 540 bearings warranted rectification and that some girders which cracked also required to be recast.

The line reopened on 23 January 2013, operating at a reduced speed of 50 km/h (31 mph). At the reduced speed, the time travel from New Delhi station to Terminal 3 of the Delhi Airport was around 40–50 minutes. Following inspection by the DMRC and various other experts, DMRC reinstated 100 km/h (62 mph) speeds on the line in mid-2014.

At the original speed of 100 km/h (62 mph), the journey from New Delhi metro station to Airport takes just 20 minutes.

In 2022, the DMRC decided to increase the operating speed from 100 km/h (62 mph) to 110 km/h (68 mph) by 2023, reducing travel time from the current 20 minutes to less than 15 minutes.

On 17 September 2023, the Dwarka Sector 25 metro station opened to the public, extending the Airport Express Line 2 km (1.2 mi) westwards towards the India International Convention and Expo Centre, which was inaugurated the same day. The station is located underneath the new convention center, with entrances providing a quick connection to exhibition halls as well as an indoor arena, among other attractions at the new convention center.

== Map ==
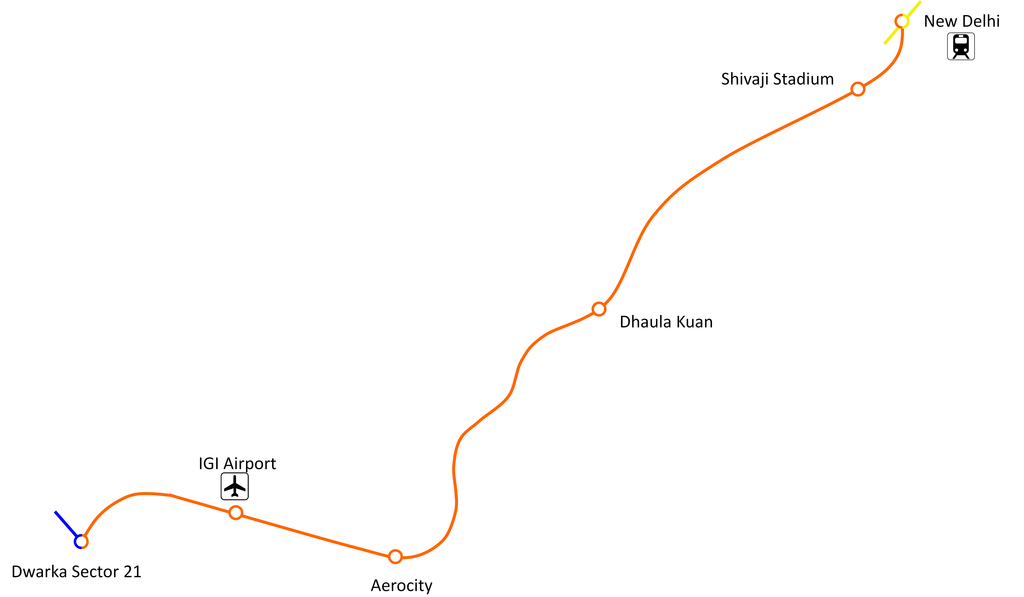
Airport Express Line (Delhi Metro)

== Stations ==
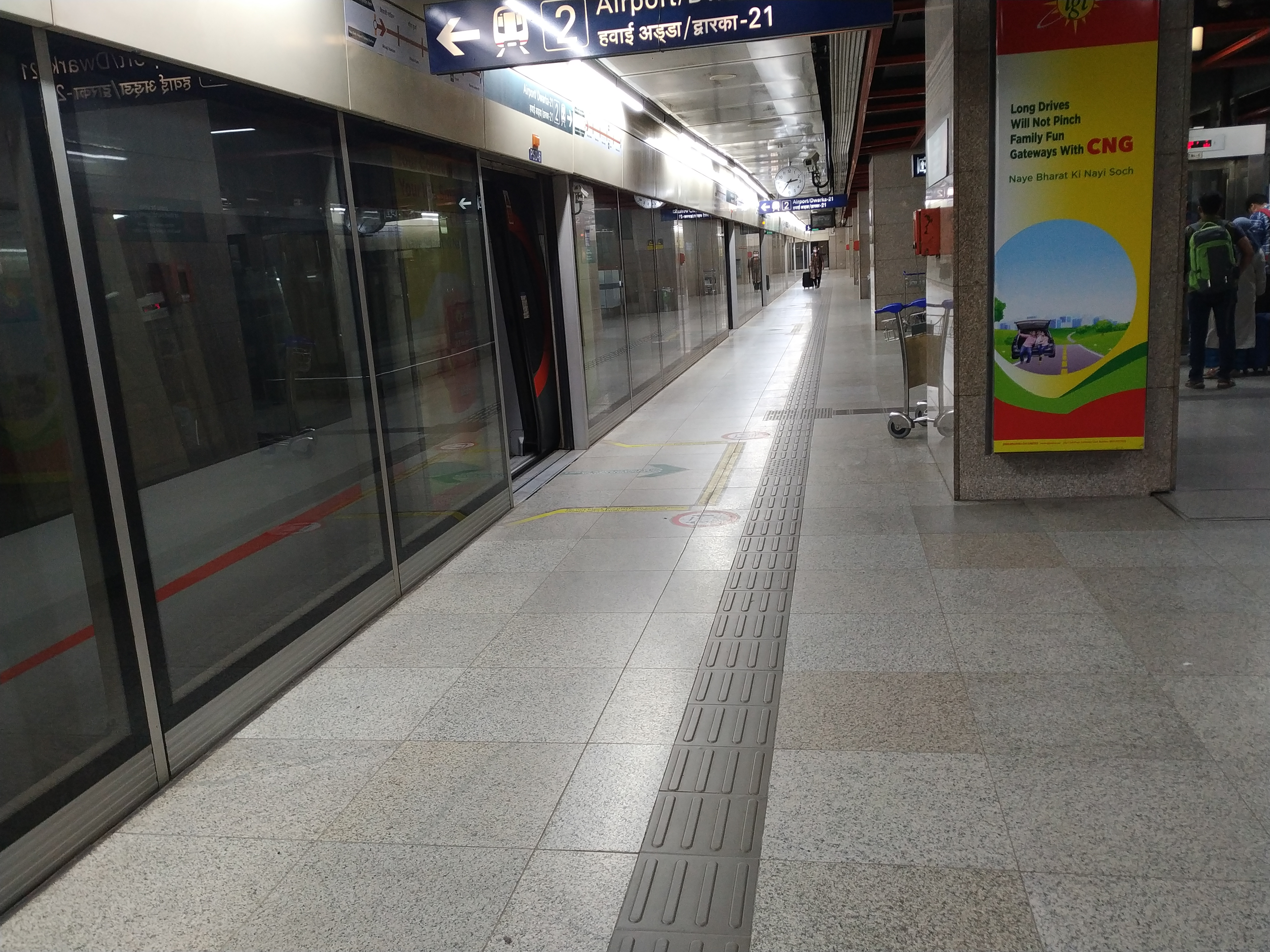
New Delhi metro station

Delhi Airport Express
#	Station Name		Phase	Opening	Interchange Connection	Station Layout	Platform Level Type
#	English	Hindi	Phase	Opening	Interchange Connection	Station Layout	Platform Level Type
1	New Delhi	नई दिल्ली	II	23 February 2011	Yellow Line Magenta Line (Phase IV - Under Construction); New Delhi	Underground	Island
2	Shivaji Stadium	शिवाजी स्टेडियम	II	23 February 2011	Magenta Line (Phase V(A) - Approved)	Underground	Island
3	Dhaula Kuan	धौला कुआँ	II	15 August 2011	Pink Line (Via Skywalk)	Elevated	Side
4	Delhi Aerocity	दिल्ली एरोसिटी	II	15 August 2011	Golden Line (Phase IV - Under Construction)	Underground	Island
5	IGI Airport	आईजीआई एअरपोर्ट	II	23 February 2011	IGI Airport (T3)	Underground	Island
6	Dwarka Sector 21	द्वारका सेक्टर 21	II	23 February 2011	Blue Line	Underground	Side
7	Yashobhoomi Dwarka Sector - 25	यशोभूमि द्वारका सेक्टर - 25	III	17 September 2023	None	Underground	Island

All the six metro stations on the line are known as City Airport Terminals (CATs). They are installed with explosive detectors, large x-ray baggage scanners, under-vehicle scanners, quick reaction teams, and dog squads. The stations feature full-height platform screen doors. All the stations are secured with a network of CCTV cameras that relays live images to the station control room, security control room, and operations control centre. The security of this line is handled by Central Industrial Security Force, which also handles the safety of all the stations of DMRC.

All the stations are disabled friendly so that people on wheelchairs can access them with facilities such as stations with ramps having a mild slope leading to elevators, the elevators are specially designed for the convenience of physically challenged people and capable of carrying stretchers, help call points are located at various points of stations and trains so that in case of any emergency, a disabled person can seek help by just pressing the call buttons. The elevators can be used by visually impaired persons with the elevator buttons having Braille letters.

== Operations ==
While it was initially planned to run trains 24 hours a day with a frequency of 10 minutes, train services, as of 2024, operate from 5:00 am to 11:40 pm (from New Delhi), with a peak 10-minute frequency, and a non-peak 15-minute frequency.

While originally expected to carry 42,000 people daily by 2011 as per detailed project report prepared by DMRC, actual ridership has hovered around 20,000. Within a few years, due to several initiative and fare reduction by the DMRC, ridership crossed 50,000 per day. As of May 2026, the line carries approximately 63,000 passengers every day.

== Fare ==
The fare for commuting has been fixed at ₹60 (64¢ US) for travel from New Delhi metro station to IGI Airport / Dwarka Sector 21. There are also passes available for 30 and 45 trips costing ₹1,600 (US$17) and ₹2,000 (US$21) respectively for travelling from New Delhi to IGI Airport. This keeps the per trip cost at ₹53.33 (57¢ US) and ₹44.44 (47¢ US) respectively and are valid for one calendar month. There are other such passes available for different origin destination combinations. Stored Value cards are also on offer which will give 10% discount on all the trips. These airport express fares are cheaper than any other modes of transport to reach airport.

== Infrastructure ==
Siemens Mobility is providing signalling, power transmission, and baggage handling system enabling passengers to check in with baggage at the New Delhi metro station and Shivaji Stadium, with 1200 passengers per hour capacity. The €34 million project was expected to be completed by 2010 in time for the Commonwealth Games but it did not manage to meet the deadline. Alcatel is supplying the communications systems. Indra Sistemas is providing the ticket machines. Faiveley is providing the platform screen doors. Bluestar and Honeywell is the control and automation provider for Station Management System (SMS). Bluestar is the main BEMS system provider.

The line will be the first line in the country to be mapped on Geographic Information System to enhance safety, maintenance and traffic regulation and will help in mobilising emergency services in case of an accident. In April 2020, DMRC published a notice for procuring a SCADA System at the line's Operational Control Centre (OCC).

=== Rolling stock ===
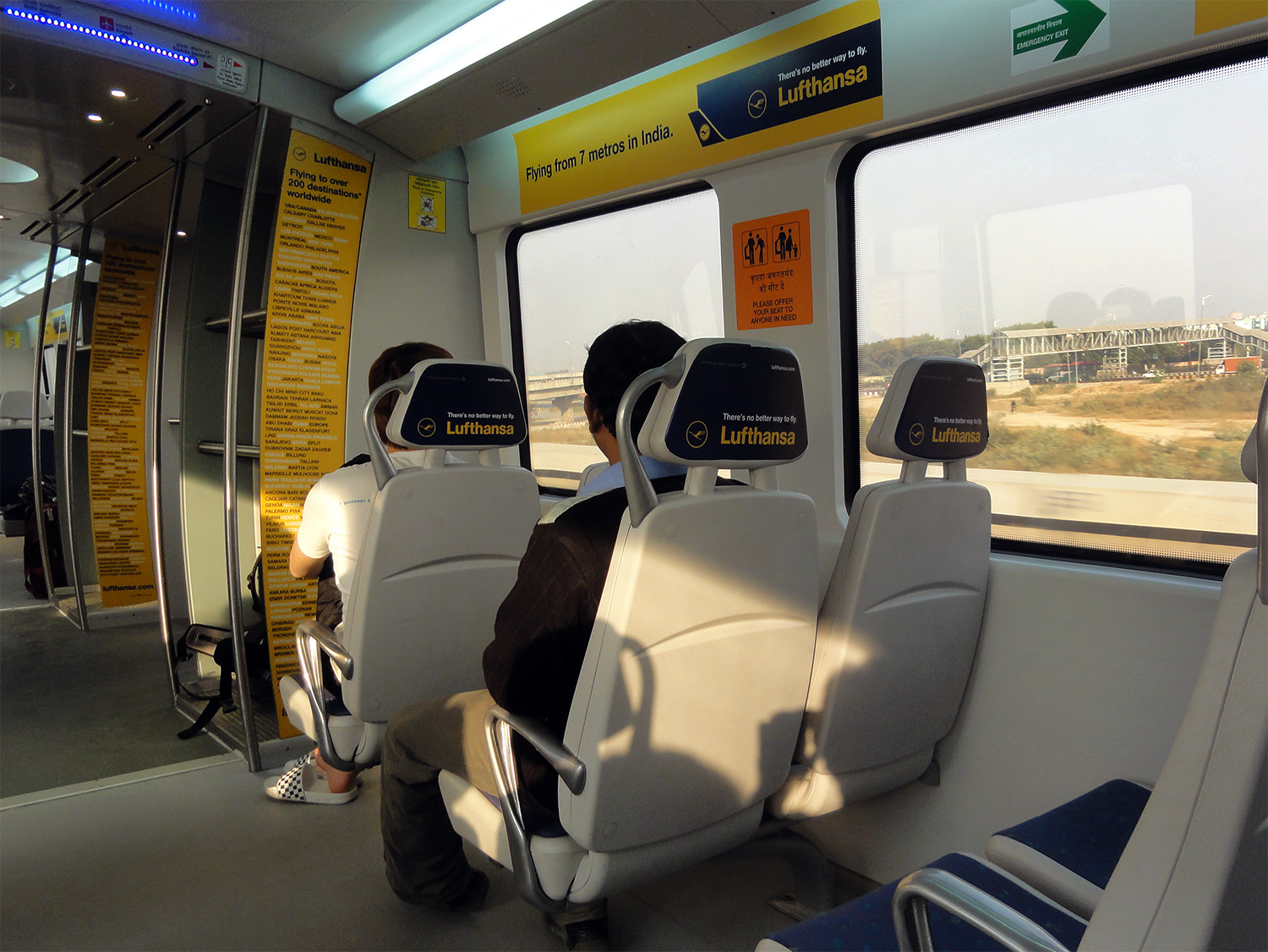
Inside an Airport Express train

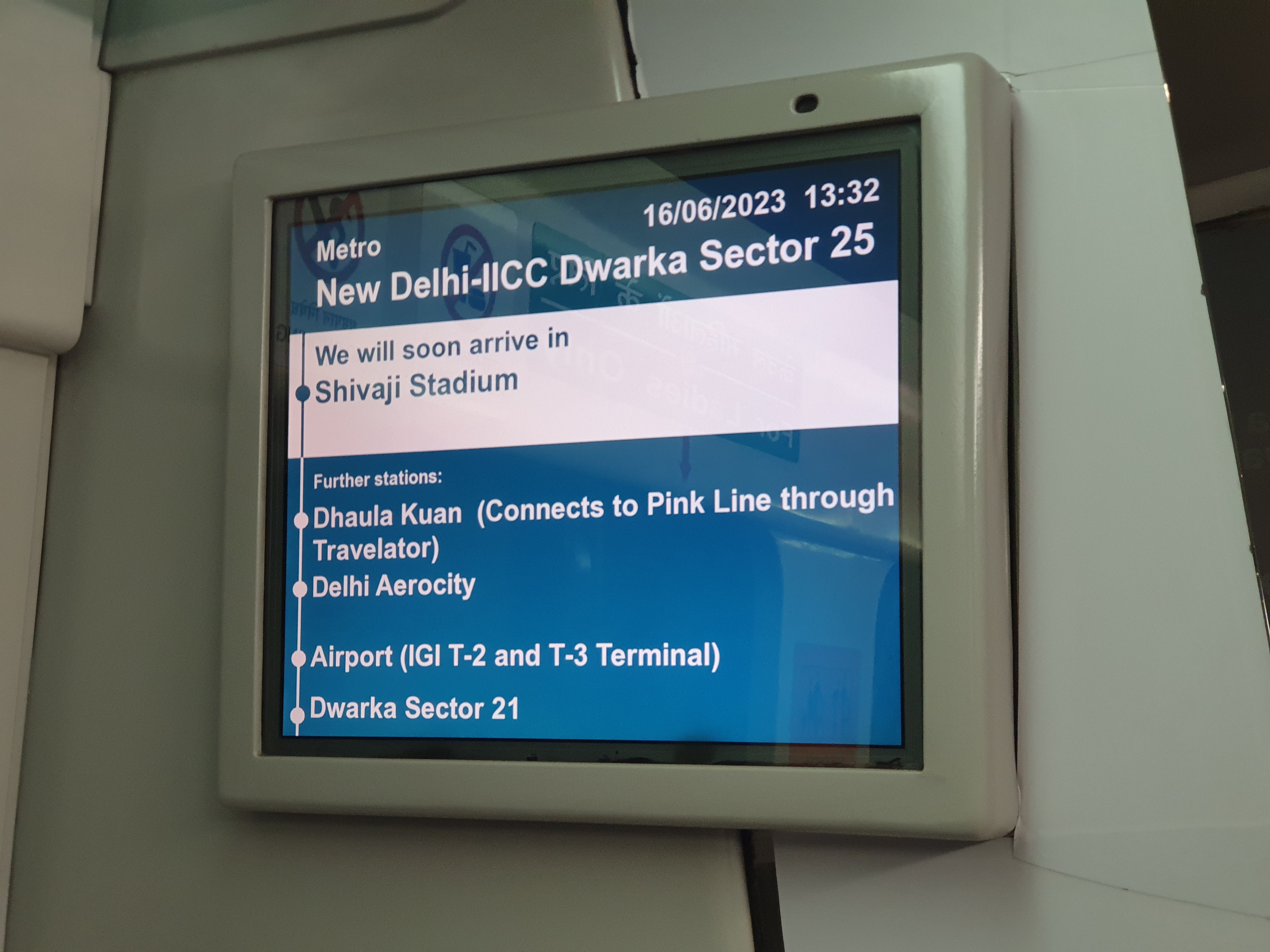
Board showing next station in Delhi Airport Metro Express

Eight six-car trains supplied by CAF were imported from Spain. CAF holds 5% equity in DAMEPL, a holding company Spice Commerce and Trade Pvt. Ltd. holds 65% equity and Reliance Infrastructure holds the remaining 30%. The trains on this line are of a premium standard and have in-built noise reduction features for a noise-free ride with padded fabric seats. The trains are fitted with an event recorder which can withstand high levels of temperature and impact and the wheels have flange lubrication system for less noise and better riding comfort.

Based on the consultancy by MTR, the interior design of the rolling stock is highly similar to that of Hong Kong's Airport Express line, which uses very similar trains.

=== Tracks ===
To ensure safety, the tracks are fitted with RHEDA-2000 signalling technology, which theoretically allows trains to travel at up to 350 km/h (220 mph) (nearly three times the actual maximum speed of current trains). The entire 22.7 km (14.1 mi) route is ballast-less track, which costs 40–50% more than normal train tracks, but does not take longer to lay than traditional tracks. The rails rest on rubber pads on the concrete sleepers for less noise.

The 7.0 km (4.3 mi) elevated section from Buddha Jayanti Park to Mahipalpur has been built with 25 m long girders for the first time in India. The 504 girders weigh 120 tons each and were cast in Mahipalpur and transported on 35 m long trailers with 64 tyres.

== Check-in and cloak room facility ==
The line has the first check in facility outside an airport in South Asia.

Passengers flying with Air India and Vistara which use T3 terminal as base of operations can check in at the New Delhi Metro Station. The check-in can be done anytime before 6 hours to 2 and half hours before departure time. Passengers flying for international flights also started checking in at this facility from 22 February 2012, however that has been stopped since COVID.

Cloak room facilities are available as well, with rates beginning at Rs 50 for the first 4 hours for luggage weighing less than 20 kilograms, to Rs 350 for 24 hours for luggage weighing more than 30 kilograms.

== Smartphone as ticket ==
Delhi Metro Rail Corporation has introduced QR code-based ticketing facility for travel on Airport Express Line from September 2018. The system will enable passengers to purchase tickets using 'Ridlr mobile App' without physically coming to the metro station. Airport Line stations even have QR-enabled entry and exit gates for commuters.

== WiFi service ==
The Airport Express line introduced WiFi services at all six stations along the route on 13 January 2012. It was the first line of the Delhi Metro to provide WiFi services. Connectivity inside metro trains travelling on the route is expected in the future. The WiFi service is provided by YOU Broadband India Limited.

== Post office ==
The post office will have all basic postal services like speed post, e-post, express parcel, registered post, postal stamps and revenue stamps on all working days from 10 am to 4 pm.

Postal services can be availed by both commuters and non-commuters as the counter is located at the non-paid area of New Delhi metro station's concourse level.

== In popular media ==
In October 2011, the Airport Express Line was used by Shah Rukh Khan to promote his movie Ra.One. In December 2011, Abhishek Bachchan, Sonam Kapoor and Neil Nitin Mukesh headed to the Airport line for promoting their movie Players, and also attempted to break a safe while travelling from one station to another.

- Promotions
1. Shah Rukh Khan for Ra.One: Airport Express Line
2. Shah Rukh Khan, Priyanka Chopra, Farhan Akhtar, Ritesh Sidhwani for Don 2: Airport Express New Delhi Station
3. Manoj Bajpayee, Tia Bajpai and Maqbool Khan for Lanka: Airport Express Line
4. Star cast of Players - Airport Express Line
- Movies shot at the Airport Express Line
1. Jannat 2 - Shivaji Stadium metro station
2. Kismat Love Paisa Dilli- Shivaji Stadium metro station
3. Tamil Film 'Thaandavam - Shivaji Stadium metro station

== See also ==
- Transport in Delhi
- Delhi Suburban Railway
- Hyderabad Airport Express Metro
- Namma Metro ORR-Airport Metro Line
- Airport Express (MTR)
