= National Highway 148A (India) =

National Highway of India

National Highway 148A

Route information
- Maintained by National Highways Authority of India
- Length: 15.5 km (9.6 mi)

Major junctions
- North end: Mehrauli
- South end: Gurgaon

Location
- Country: India
- States: Delhi, Haryana

Highway system
- Roads in India; Expressways; National; State; Asian

National Highway 148A (NH 148A) also known as MG Road is a National Highway of India that starts at Delhi and terminates at Gurgaon connecting through states of India. It has a total length of 15.5 kilometres (9.6 mi). NH 148A passes through the states of Delhi and Haryana.

Its stretch from Delhi to Mumbai was earlier designated NH 8 and the stretch between Mumbai and Gurgaon was designated NH 4 before all the national highways were renumbered in the year 2010.

== Route ==
The NH 148A passes through these important cities and towns that are given below:

- Delhi
- Gurgaon

== See also ==
- List of national highways in India
- List of national highways in India by state
- National Highways Development Project
- National Highway 169 (India)
- National Highway 66 (India)
