= Yashobhoomi =

Convention centre in Dwarka, Delhi

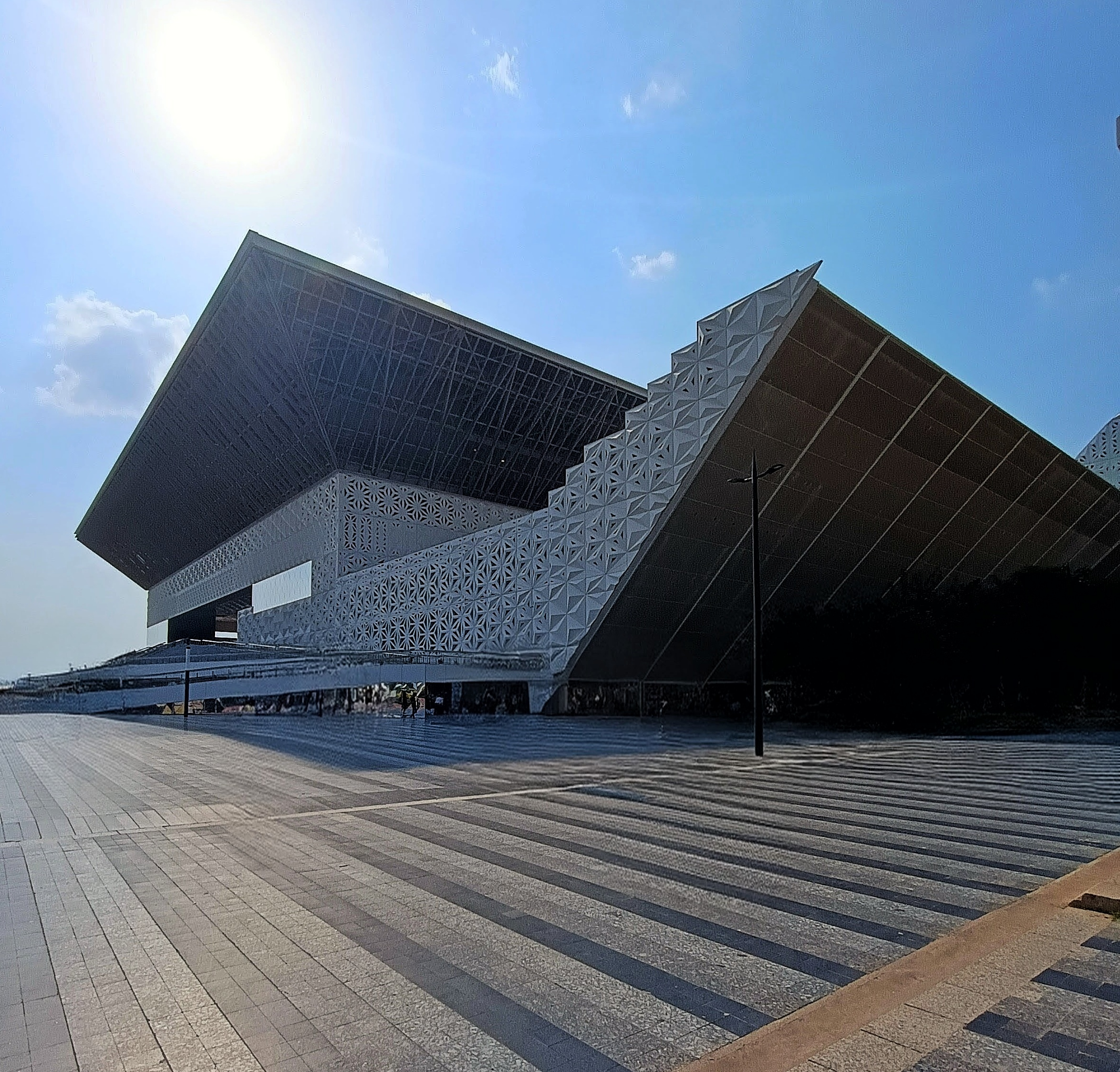
- Exterior view of Yashobhoomi International Convention Centre
- Alternative names: India International Convention and Exhibition Centre

General information
- Type: Convention center
- Architectural style: Contemporary architecture
- Location: Sector 25, Dwarka, Delhi, India
- Coordinates: 28.554862°N 77.044636°E
- Groundbreaking: 20 September 2018
- Completed: 15 September 2023
- Opened: 17 September 2023; 3 years ago
- Cost: ₹25,700 crore (US$2.7 billion)
- Client: India International Convention and Exhibition Center Limited

Technical details
- Floor area: 73,000 sq.m. (Phase-I); 890,000 sq.m. (entire project)

Design and construction
- Architecture firm: C P Kukreja Architects; IDOM; ARCOP Associates
- Main contractor: Larsen & Toubro

Other information
- Seating capacity: 11,000 (Phase-I)
- Public transit: Yashobhoomi Dwarka Sector - 25

Website
- Official website

Yashobhoomi is a convention center located in Sector 25, Dwarka, Delhi, India. It is the largest convention center in India and Asia by area, and one of the biggest MICE facilities in the world. Yashobhoomi's foundation stone was laid on 20 September 2018. Construction began the following day and the first phase was expected to be completed by September 2022 in time to host the G20 Summit in 2023.

However, labour shortages and slowdowns in work caused by the COVID-19 pandemic delayed completion to 15 September 2023. The first phase of Yashobhoomi was inaugurated on 17 September 2023.

Its development cost are projected to be around ₹25,700 crore (US$2.7 billion), out of which its first phase cost ₹5,400 crore (US$560 million). The total area of the entire convention center is 890,000 m^{2}, with built-up areas of over 100,000 m^{2} and 300,000 m^{2}, while its first phase covers 73,000 m^{2}.

== Structure ==
The complex's first phase covers a total area of 1.07 lakh sq.m. out of the planned 8.90 lakh sq.m., making it not only the largest convention centre in India and Asia, but also among the world's largest convention and MICE centres. It is larger than Bharat Mandapam, where the 2023 G20 New Delhi summit was held. It has 15 convention centres, which include the main auditorium, the Grand Ballroom and 13 meeting centres, having a total capacity of holding 11,000 people. The meeting rooms span across eight floors in the main auditorium. Upon completion of the second phase, which shall conclude construction, Yashobhoomi will have five large exhibition centres, including a multi-purpose arena with a retractable roof and a seating capacity for 20,000 people. Each centre will cover a floor area of over 10 lakh sq.ft., equalling the size of four football grounds. The complex will be able to host aircraft expositions as well because of their abundant space.

== Main auditorium ==
=== Grand Ballroom ===
It is a large ballroom that can handle around 2,500 people. It also has an extended open area outside it that can handle another 500 people, thus taking its capacity up to 3,000 people.

== Features ==
The main auditorium has many features for decoration inspired from Indian culture, such as terrazzo floors with brass inlays representing rangoli patterns, suspended sound absorbent metal cylinders and lit-up patterned walls. The auditorium has many innovative automated seating systems, one of which allows the floor to be a flat floor or an auditorium style tiered seating for different seating configurations. The Grand Ballroom has a petal-themed design on the ceiling and has interior as well as exterior seating areas. It has VIP lounges, meeting rooms, a sky lobby and co-working spaces.

The complex has an underground car parking facility for over 3,000 cars and is equipped with more than 100 electric charging points, cafes, restrooms, multiple entry and exit points and a 1 km-long foyer to link spaces and amenities. The complex is equipped with an advanced wastewater treatment plant with 100 percent wastewater reusing and rainwater harvesting systems for water construction and rooftop solar panels on all structures for clean and sustainable energy and electricity generation. Because of these eco-friendly measures, the complex has received "Green Cities Platinum" certification from Indian Green Building Council (IGBC).

== Connectivity ==
=== Roadways ===
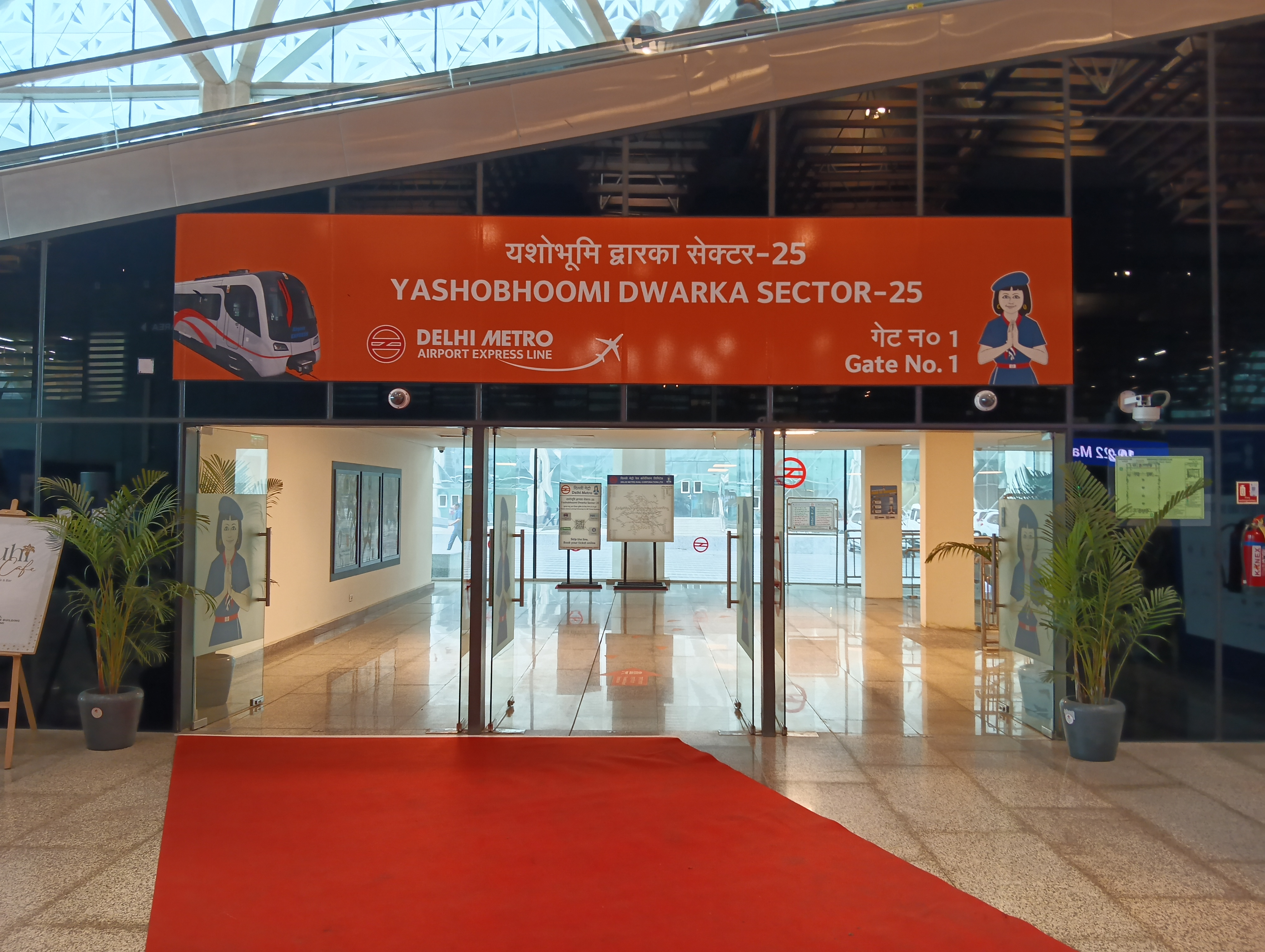
Yashobhoomi Dwarka Sec-25 Metro station (Gate no. 1).

IICC can be reached by road at present through the Sector 22 Road from Dwarka. By March 2024, it could be reached directly from farther places, like from Indira Gandhi International Airport and Narela at the periphery of Delhi through Urban Extension Road-II (UER-II), ending as terminating point just north-east of the complex, next to Dwarka Sector 21 metro station, and from Gurugram through the Dwarka Expressway or the Delhi–Gurgaon Expressway (part of Golden Quadrilateral), before accessing UER-II, both passing towards east of the complex.

=== Railways ===
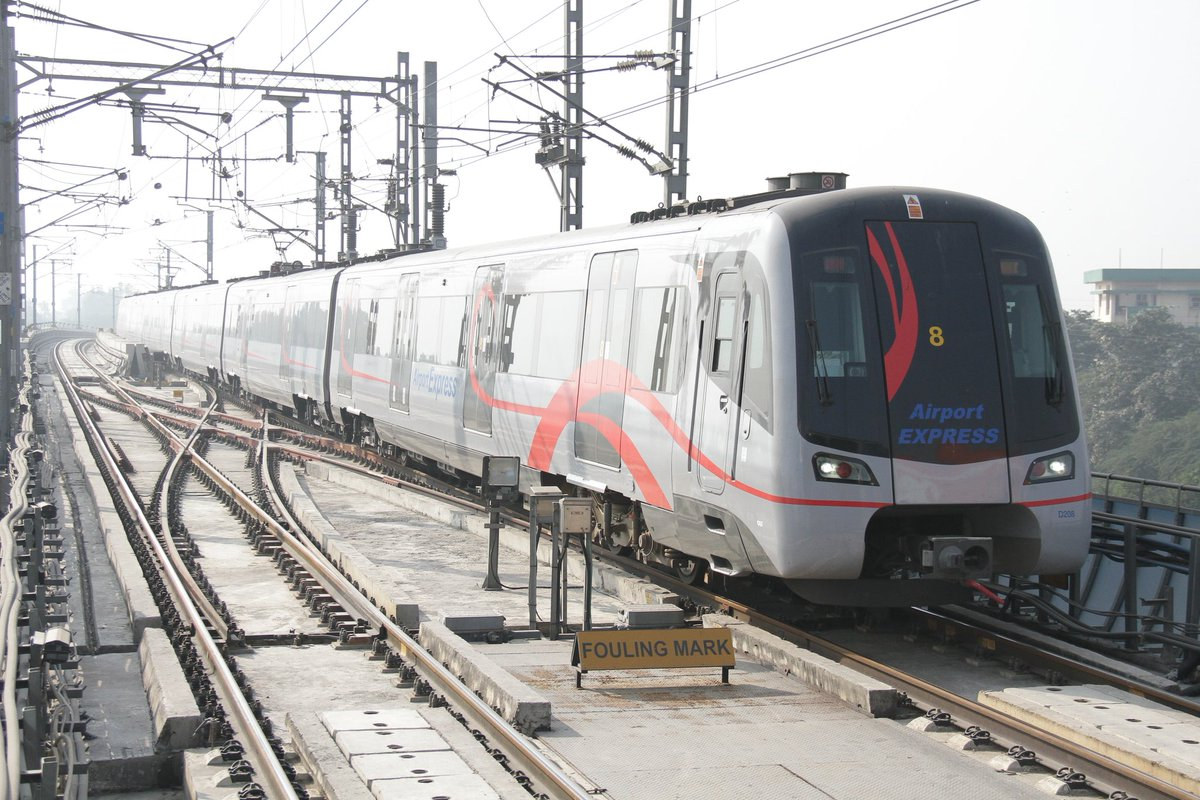
Airport Express Line (Orange Line) of Delhi Metro

The nearest railway station is Bijwasan railway station situated 5 km (3.1 mi) south-east from the complex. The nearest metro station is Yashobhoomi Dwarka Sector - 25 metro station, the western terminus of Orange Line or Airport Express Line of Delhi Metro. It is situated within the complex zone.

=== Airways ===
Indira Gandhi International Airport's terminals can be accessed from the complex by travelling 12 km (7.5 mi) east through the UER-II before taking the airport approach roads.

== See also ==
- List of convention and exhibition centres in India
- Bharat Mandapam
- List of highways and expressways in Delhi
- Delhi Metro
