= Terminal 1 IGI Airport metro station =

Metro station in Delhi, India

IGI Airport Terminal 1

General information
- Location: IGL Airport Terminal 1, New Delhi, Delhi 110037
- Coordinates: 28.5648°N 77.1227°E
- System: Delhi Metro station
- Owner: Delhi Metro
- Operator: Delhi Metro Rail Corporation (DMRC)
- Line: Magenta Line Golden Line
- Platforms: Island Platform; Platform-1 → Botanical Garden; Platform-2 → Inderlok
- Tracks: 2

Construction
- Structure type: Underground, Double-track
- Platform levels: 2
- Accessible: Yes

Other information
- Status: Staffed, Operational
- Station code: IGDA

History
- Opened: 29 May 2018; 8 years ago
- Electrified: 25 kV 50 Hz AC through overhead catenary

Services
Preceding station	Delhi Metro	Following station
Sadar Bazar Cantonment towards Inderlok	Magenta Line	Shankar Vihar towards Botanical Garden
Future Service
Terminus	Golden Line	Delhi Aerocity towards Kalindi Kunj
Route map
Location

The IGI Airport Terminal 1 Metro Station is located on the Magenta Line of the Delhi Metro. It was part of Phase III of Delhi Metro. It was opened to public on 29 May 2018.

== The station ==
=== Station layout ===
G	Street Level	Exit/ Entrance
C	Concourse	Fare control, station agent, Ticket/token, shops
P	Platform 1 Eastbound	Towards → Botanical Garden; Next Station: Shankar Vihar
P	Island platform | Doors will open on the right
P	Platform 2 Westbound	Towards ← Inderlok; Next Station: Sadar Bazar Cantonment

== Entry/Exit ==
Terminal 1 IGI Airport metro station Entry/Exit
Gate No-1	Gate No-2	Gate No-3	Gate No-4	Gate No-5
Mehram Nagar West; Dhaula Kuan	Domestic Departure; T-1 Parking	Domestic Arrival G5 Building	Departures	Arrivals

== Connections ==
Links to Indira Gandhi International Airport Terminal 1-D.

== See also ==
- IGI Airport metro station
- List of Delhi Metro stations
- Transport in Delhi
- Delhi Metro Rail Corporation
- Delhi Suburban Railway
- Delhi Monorail
- Indira Gandhi International Airport
- Delhi Transport Corporation
- South West Delhi
- National Capital Region (India)
- List of rapid transit systems
- List of metro systems
