= Vasant Kunj =

- Neighborhood of Delhi
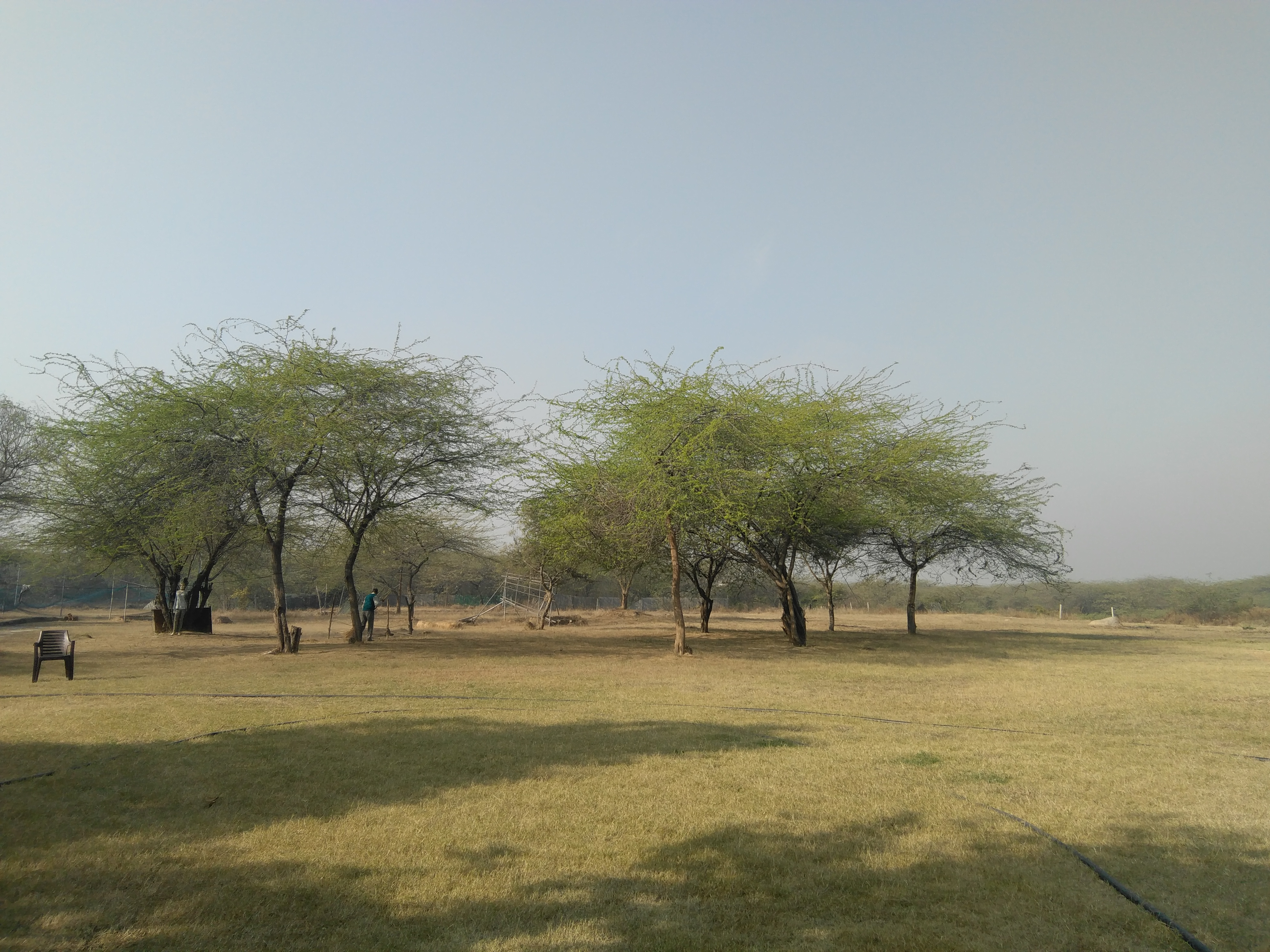

- Location in Delhi, India
- Coordinates: 28.5273352°N 77.15154529999995°E
- Country: India
- Union Territory: Delhi
- District: New Delhi
- Metro: Vasant Vihar metro station

Languages
  - Official: Hindi, English
- Time zone: UTC+5:30 (IST)
- Planning agency: MCD

Vasant Kunj is a neighbourhood located in New Delhi in the New Delhi district of Indian union territory of Delhi. The area is home to several businessmen, actors, cricketers and the former prime minister of India, Manmohan Singh. It is located close to Indira Gandhi International Airport and the commercial hub of Gurgaon. In the early '90s, Vasant Kunj was the agriculture-based land of Kishangarh Village. It has many residential areas under military as Ruchi Vihar and Tarapore Enclave.

== Locality ==
Vasant Kunj was once farmland and was acquired by the government in the 1960s. The areas surrounding Vasant Kunj consist of farmland and the area is famous for palatial farmhouses. The locality is surrounded by greenery, with the South-Central Ridge of the Delhi Ridge encompassing the area and this forest is called Sanjay Van. The other residential areas in proximity are Chattarpur, Saket, Malviya Nagar, Mahipalpur, Lado Sarai, Ber Sarai, and Neb Sarai. The residential part of Vasant Kunj is divided into 5 Sectors – A, B, C, D and E. Each Sector is further divided into Pockets, for example, C1, C2, C3 up to C9. These pockets are further divided into blocks A, B, C, D, E, F, G, and H until required

== In history ==
Sultan Ghari tomb in Vasant Kunj is considered as the first Islamic mausoleum in Delhi. The historic Qutb Minar complex is located close to Vasant Kunj.

== Economy ==
Bloomsbury India has its head office in the Vishrut Building (Building No. 3) in the DDA Complex in Vasant Kunj. Also the corporate offices of the Bharti Enterprises, Maruti Suzuki India Ltd. and Oil and Natural Gas Corporation are located in the area near Ambience mall. Research Center of American multi-national IBM is located at ISID Campus in Vasant Kunj.

DLF's Ambience, Promenade and Emporio located in Vasant Kunj have been touted as luxury fashion destinations that are built on one of the largest value land auctioned by DDA. The Malls include DLF Emporio, DLF Promenade, Ambience Mall. Another Mall that stands alone is the Vasant Square Mall.

Vasant Kunj has two Police Stations, divided into North and South.

Vasant Kunj also has two forests with access to the public. The Sanjay Van on JNU Road and the forest behind the Grand Hotel. There are also two big natural water bodies in Vasant Kunj, one behind Sector A, Pocket B & C and the second on the JNU road.

The Grand, a five-star luxury hotel, is located on Nelson Mandela Marg, Vasant Kunj. Export Promotion Council for Handicrafts (E.P.C.H.) is located at Sector C in Vasant Kunj.

== Education ==
TERI University is located in Vasant Kunj. The School of Planning and Architecture had proposed to build its new campus off Nelson Mandela Marg; however, as of August 2023, the project is stuck due to lack of approvals from Delhi's forest department. Jawaharlal Nehru University (J.N.U.), including the Indian Institute of Mass Communication, is surrounded by Vasant Kunj on its west and south.

Some of the prominent schools in the area include Delhi Public School, Vasant Valley School, D.A.V. Public School, , Bhatnagar International School and Ryan International School, while some of the play schools and nursery schools are Tender Feet Nursery School, Aadyant Global School, and Steady Steps International Preschool.

== Sports ==
Vasant Kunj Sports Complex is one of the most prominent sports complexes set up by DDA. Beeya's Riding Facility in Vasant Kunj is a nationally recognized horse riding club.

== Health care ==
The Indian Spinal Injuries Centre, Institute of Liver and Biliary Sciences, Fortis Flt. Lt. Rajan Dhall Hospital, and New Delhi Children's Hospital & Research Centre (NDCHRC) are some of the prominent hospitals located in Vasant Kunj.

== Government offices ==
The Shaurya CRPF Officers Training Institute, International Centre for Alternate Dispute Resolution, and the Indian Aviation Academy, along with offices of Pension Fund Regulatory and Development Authority and National Book Trust, are located in the Vasant Kunj Institutional Area.

== See also ==
- Defence Colony
- Greater Kailash
- South West Delhi
- South Delhi
