= Mahipalpur =

- Village/Town
- Interactive map of Mahipalpur
- Coordinates: 28.5449°N 77.1281°E
- Country: India
- State: Delhi
- District: South West Delhi district

Languages
  - Native: Hindi
- Time zone: UTC+5:30 (IST)
- PIN: 110037
- Planning agency: Municipal Corporation of Delhi

Mahipalpur on National Highway - 8, leading to Gurugram and Jaipur has ancient roots and it is amongst the oldest villages of India. It is located at the edge of south central ridge of 1500 million year old Aravali Hills; It is bound by the South Central Ridge in the North East, Vasant Kunj towards East, Shankar Vihar (Military Cantonment) towards North, National Highway -8 towards North West and Rangpuri village toward South West. Currently the most popular hotel and guest house destination in Delhi. In revenue department record it is an urban village, located in New Delhi district of Delhi, India. It is located near the Indira Gandhi International Airport. Delhi Aerocity metro station is the nearest metro station.

== History ==
Mahipalpur has derived its name from Raja Mahipal Singh Tanwar, a Tomar Rajput ruler associated with the Tomara dynasty of Delhi. According to traditional Tomar genealogies, Raja Mahipal Singh is described as the 18th ruler of Delhi and 19th descendant of Anangpal Tomar. The Tomara dynasty, also referred to as Tomar or Tanwar, ruled parts of Delhi and present-day Haryana during the early medieval period. Historians associate the foundation of nearby Naraina village with Raja Narain Pal Singh Tanwar, grandson of Raja Mahipal Singh Tomar, and belonging to the same Tanwar Rajput lineage. It is a Tanwar/Tomar Rajput village.

The Sultan Ghari monument was built in around 10th century by the Pratihara dynasty. Mahipalpur has an ancient Hauz and Mahal, two historical monuments which reveal the habitation of this area during the seven capitals that existed in Delhi in historic times.

== Significance of the village ==
Mahipalpur is a historically significant urban village which is situated near National Highway 48 (NH48). In the first legislative assembly of Delhi in 1952, public representative for Najafgarh Constituency, Shri Ajit Singh, MLA hailed from Mahipalpur village.

In the 8th Legislative assembly of Delhi Colonel Devinder Sehrawat, who was elected as public representative i.e. MLA of Bijwasan Constituency also hails from this village.

Mahipalpur is one of the villages affected by land acquisition. Individual agriculture land was acquired for construction of the Indira Gandhi International Airport and National Highway 8. The village was given very less compensation for their individual private agriculture land. The Gram Sabha Land of the village was acquired and in most of the former gram sabha land of Mahipalpur, the Aravali Bio Diversity park is set up. The villagers however have no access to the Aravali Bio Diversity park as the passage from village is blocked by Shankar vihar Cantt.

Like all rural villages Mahipalpur also has a rich heritage of celebration of festivals and seasonal and celestial occurrences. The Nangara of Village Mahipalpur is visible at most political events in the capital. the inhabitants of the urban village often celebrate Holi and other hindu festivals.

Mahipalpur has hosted two Mahapanchayats.

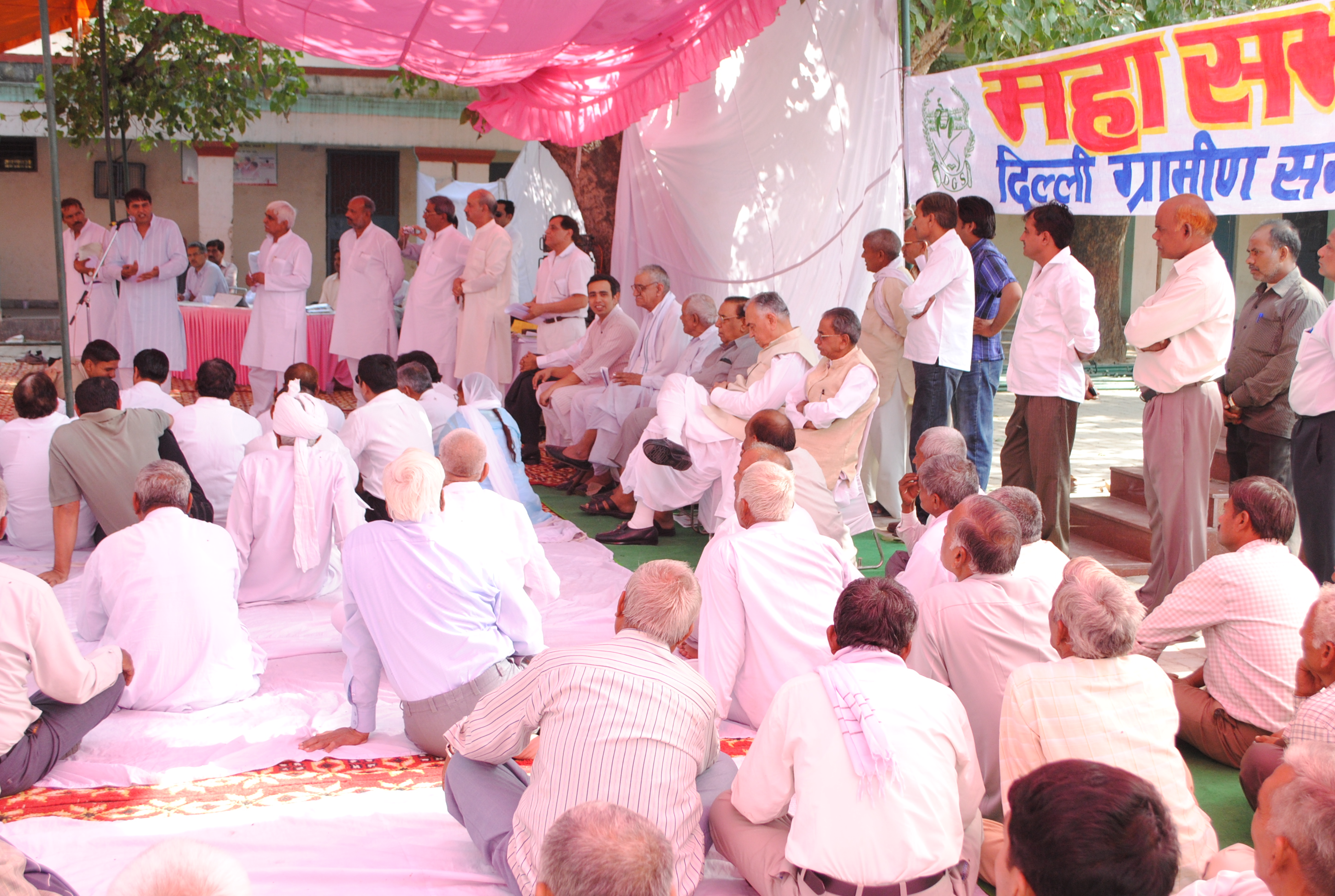
Mahipalpur Maha-Panchayat on 24 Oct 2010

=== Maha- Panchayat at Mahipalpur On 25 October 2010 ===
It was organised by Colonel Devinder Sehrawat, the then Secretary of Delhi Gramin Samaj.Shri Balram Jakhar, former speaker of Lok Sabha of India presided over the meeting and Shri Jayant Chaudhary, MP of RLD party was special guest. The mah-Panchayat was conducted with the aim of protect & safeguard the interest of villagers.

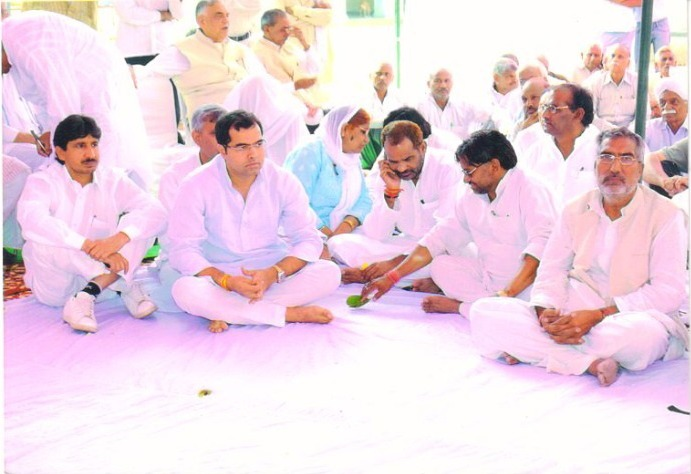
Rural Leaders present at the Maha-Panchayat at Mahipalpur on 24 Oct 2010

The Maha-Panchayat was very well attended and several rural leaders were present in this meeting.

The agenda points included:-

- Regularisation of extended Lal Dora existing Abadi
- Construction should be permitted in Extended Lal Dora and Existing Abadi and the order on getting the building plan sanctioned should be withdrawn being impractical.
- Acquisition of Land be carried out only after negotiation with the landowners. No force able acquisition of land. First right of utilising land for commercial activity be given to the land owners, role of DDA as middle man should be minimised.
- The land of villages of South Delhi acquired in 1980 be denotified as most of the area has come under construction and occupation and the sword of land acquisition should be removed from their head.
- Delhi Land Reform Act 1954 should be abolished immediately and section 81 be withdrawn to protect the interest of villagers
- Villagers should be involved and have the right in Management of Gram Sabha Land.
- Prepare a comprehensive Development plan for Villages of Delhi. Provide basic amenities like Sewage system, Parks, Mother Dairy and Safal outlets, sport facilities e.g. playground &stadiums, colleges for boys & girls and dispensaries in villages. The villages should be developed before acquisition of the land by DDA.
- No Conversion charge be levied on properties located on roads of rural as well as urbanised villages where land has been acquired by the govt as the rent is the only source of income for farmers rendered jobless due to land acquisition.
- Restore representation rights to villages of Delhi and rectify the folly of abolition of erstwhile Panchayats.
- Review the decision to impose House Tax in Villages without providing any facilities.
- Issue the gazette notification and Implementation of rent control Act which has not been implemented even after having been passed by both the houses of the parliament and signed by the president.
- Provide reservation to children of farmers whose land has been acquired in schools built on the allotted land.
- Institutions of higher education located in Delhi should recognize the OBC status of farmers of Delhi who have been declared backward as a result of the land acquisition by the State commission.
- Safeguard the old customs and traditions of the villages.
- DTC shelters are not provided in rural areas, these should be provided being essential for the commuters.
- Public utilities and urinals are totally absent in rural areas these should be developed in rural belt to provide basic civic facilities to the rural population.

== See also ==
- Vasant Kunj
- Delhi Aerocity metro station
