= New Delhi metro station =

Metro station in Delhi, India

New Delhi नई दिल्ली

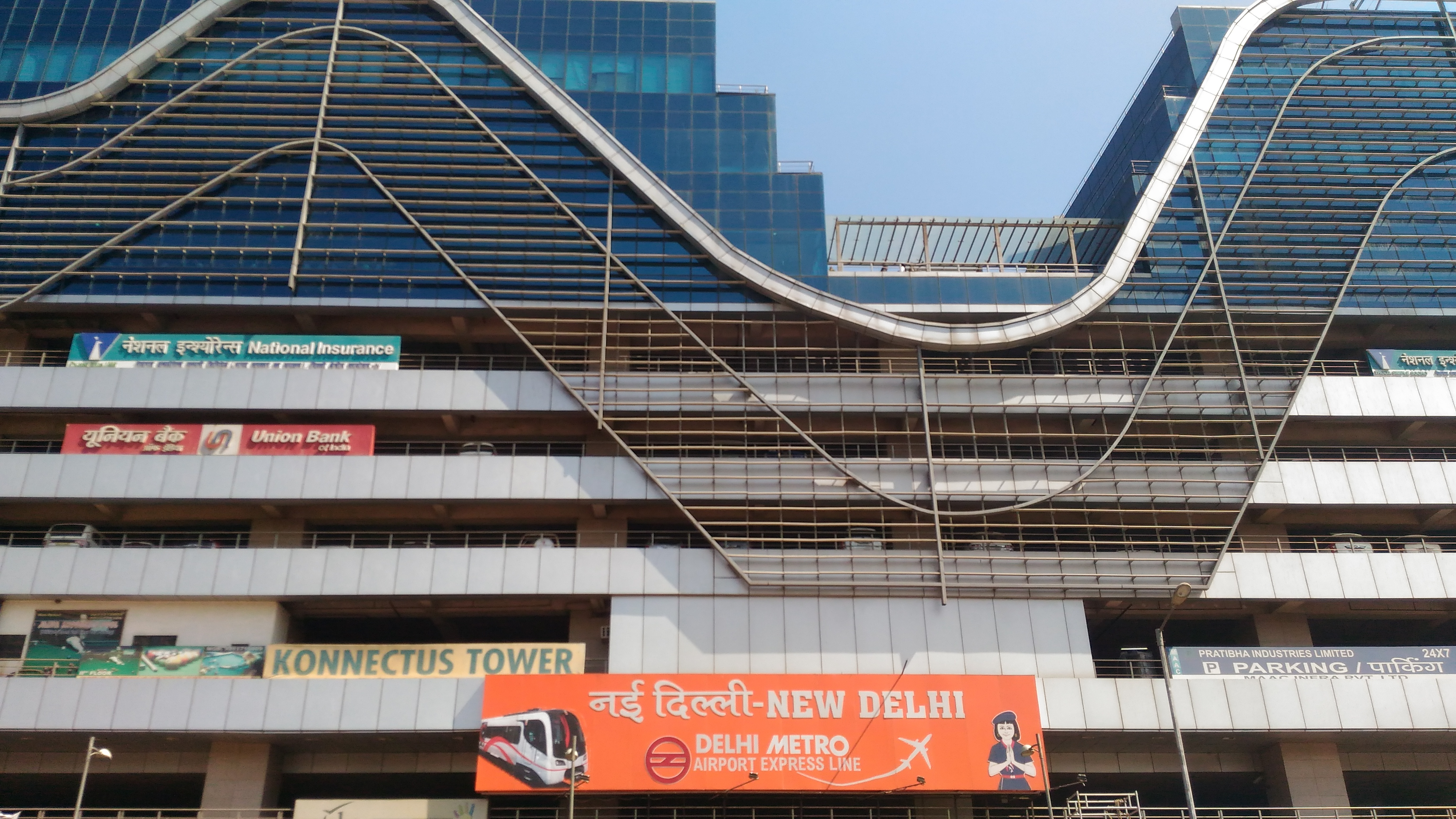

General information
- Location: Ajmeri Gate Road, New Delhi, Delhi, 110002; India
- Coordinates: 28°38′32″N 77°13′17″E
- System: Delhi Metro station
- Owner: Delhi Metro
- Line: Yellow Line Airport Express Magenta Line (upcoming)
- Platforms: Yellow Line Island platform Airport Express Side platform Magenta Line TBC
- Tracks: 4
- Connections: New Delhi

Construction
- Structure type: Underground
- Platform levels: 2
- Parking: Available
- Accessible: Yes

Other information
- Station code: NDI

History
- Opened: Yellow Line: 3 July 2005; 21 years ago; Airport Express 23 February 2011; 15 years ago; Magenta Line; Yet to be operational
- Electrified: 25 kV 50 Hz AC through overhead catenary

Passengers
- January 2015: 1,616,021; 52,130 (daily average)

Services
Preceding station	Delhi Metro	Following station
Chawri Bazar towards Samaypur Badli	Yellow Line	Rajiv Chowk towards Millennium City Centre Gurugram
Shivaji Stadium towards Yashobhoomi Dwarka Sector - 25	Airport Express	Terminus
Future service
Nabi Karim towards Inderlok	Magenta Line	Delhi Gate towards Botanical Garden
Route map
Location

New Delhi is an underground interchange station on the Yellow Line and Airport Express Line of the Delhi Metro. Located adjacent to the Ajmeri Gate entrance of New Delhi railway station, it provides direct access to the railway station through a dedicated skywalk.

The Airport Express Line terminates at New Delhi metro station, providing a direct connection to Indira Gandhi International Airport. The station also offers city check-in and baggage-drop facilities for airline passengers. As of 2024, these services were available to passengers flying with Air India.

A 242 metres (794 ft) long skywalk connecting the metro station with the Ajmeri Gate side of New Delhi railway station was opened to the public on 5 March 2022. The skywalk also connects to the railway station's foot overbridge and a multi-level parking facility across Bhavbhuti Marg.

== Station layout ==
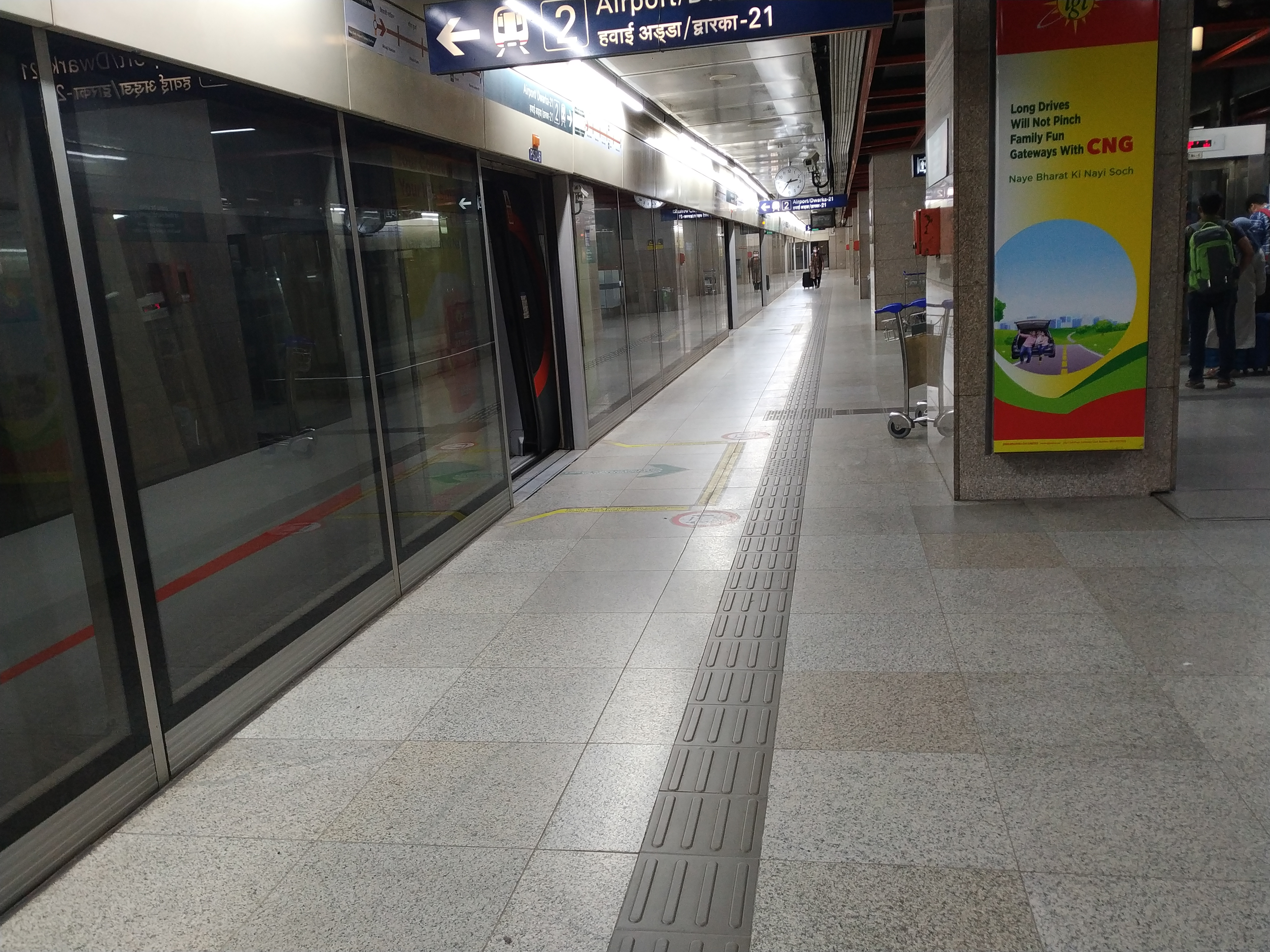
Platform of the Airport Express Line of the station

G	Street Level	Exit/ Entrance
C	Concourse	Fare control, station agent, Ticket/token, shops
P	Platform 1 Southbound	Towards → Millennium City Centre Gurugram; Next Station: Rajiv Chowk Change at the next station for Blue Line
P	Island platform | Doors will open on the right
P	Platform 2 Northbound	Towards ← Samaypur Badli; Next Station: Chawri Bazar

Airport Express Station Layout

G	Street level	Exit/Entrance
C	Concourse	Fare control, station agent, Ticket/token, shops
P	Platform 1 Northbound	Towards → Train Terminates Here
P	Island platform | Doors will open on the right
P	Platform 1 South West bound	Towards ← Yashobhoomi Dwarka Sector - 25; Next Station: Shivaji Stadium

== See also ==
- List of Delhi Metro stations
- Transport in Delhi
- Delhi Metro Rail Corporation
- Delhi Suburban Railway
- Delhi Transport Corporation
- North Delhi
- National Capital Region (India)
- List of rapid transit systems
- List of metro systems
