= Yashobhoomi Dwarka Sector - 25 metro station =

Metro station in Delhi, India

Yashobhoomi Dwarka Sector - 25

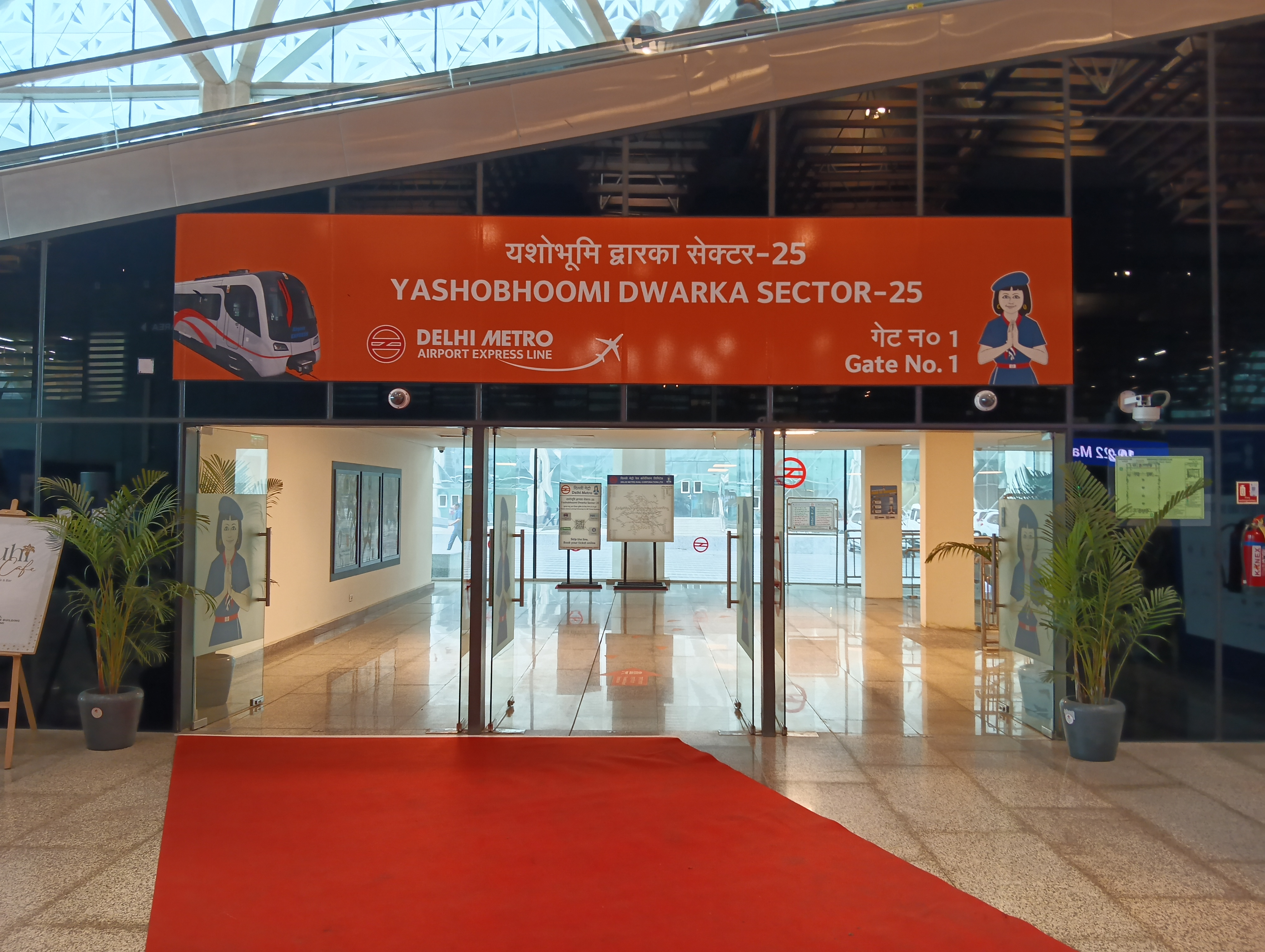

General information
- Coordinates: 28°33′08″N 77°02′36″E
- System: Delhi Metro station
- Line: Airport Express
- Tracks: 2

Construction
- Structure type: Underground
- Depth: 17 m (56 ft)
- Accessible: Yes

History
- Opened: 17 September 2023

Services
Preceding station	Delhi Metro	Following station
Terminus	Airport Express	Dwarka Sector 21 towards New Delhi
Route map
Location

Yashobhoomi Dwarka Sector 25 is an underground terminal station on the Airport Express Line of the Delhi Metro, serving the Yashobhoomi (India International Convention and Expo Centre) complex in Dwarka, New Delhi. Trial runs on the 2 km (1.2 mi) extension of the Airport Express Line between Dwarka Sector 21 and Dwarka Sector 25 began on 26 June 2022. The extension and the new station were inaugurated on 17 September 2023, along with the first phase of the Yashobhoomi convention and exhibition centre.

The station has seven entry and exit gates providing access to the Yashobhoomi complex. Gate 1 is located within the IICC complex and connects to the exhibition halls through a 735 metres (2,411 ft) long underground corridor, which also provides access to the convention centre and central arena. Gate 6 provides another access point to the complex from the station's unpaid concourse. The corridor is equipped with escalators and lifts.

== Station layout ==
L2	Side platform | Doors will open on the left
L2	Platform 2 Northbound	Towards → New Delhi; Next Station: Dwarka Sector 21
L2	Platform 1 South West bound	Towards ← Train Terminates Here
L2	Side platform | Doors will open on the left
L1	Concourse	Fare control, station agent, Metro Card vending machines, crossover
G	Street Level	Exit/Entrance
