= Jharoda Majra metro station =

Train station of the Delhi Metro

Jharoda Majra

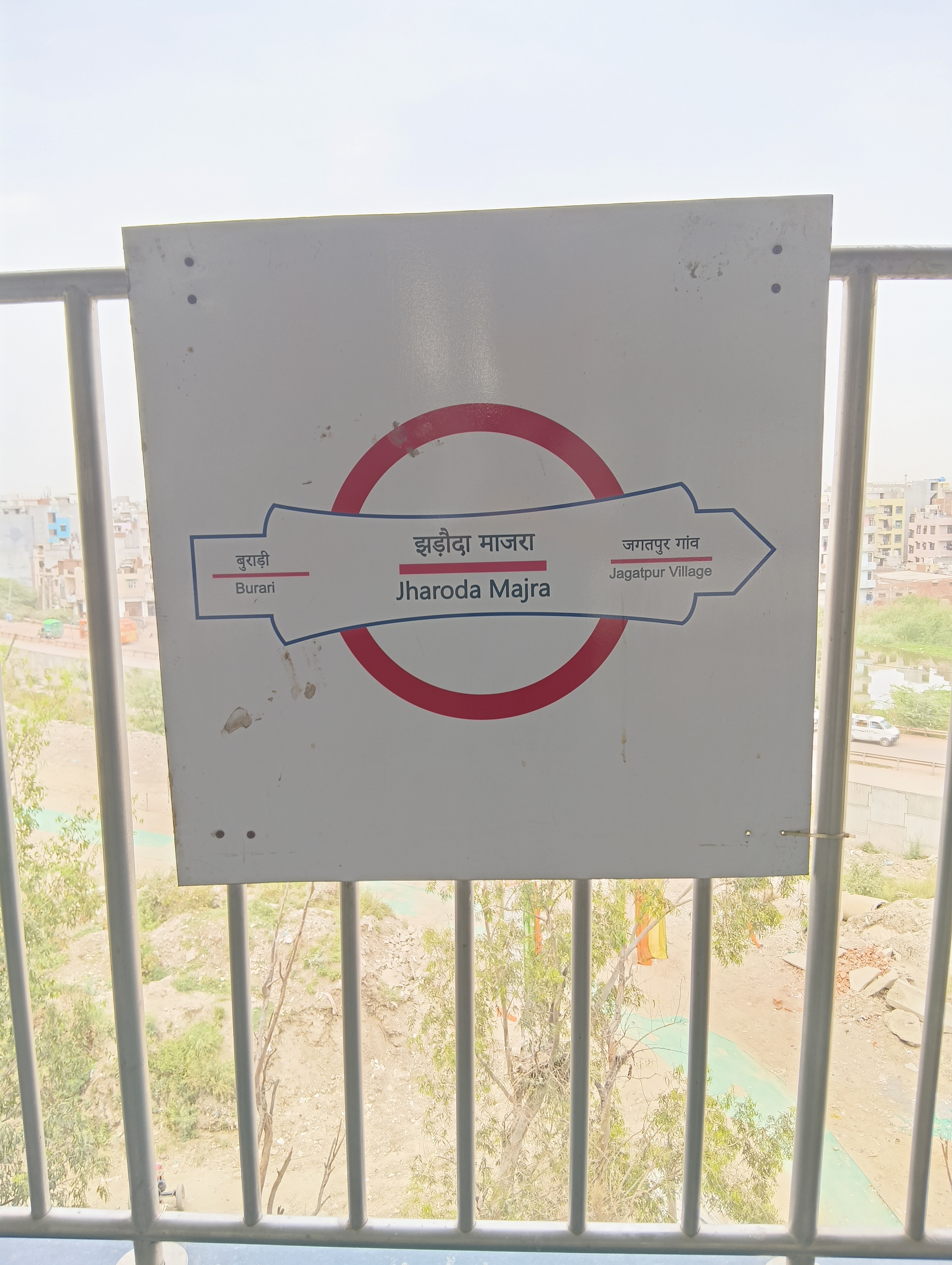

General information
- System: Delhi Metro station
- Owner: Delhi Metro
- Operator: Delhi Metro Rail Corporation (DMRC)
- Line: Pink Line
- Platforms: Side Platform; Platform 1 → "-" Circular Line; Platform 2 → "+" Circular Line
- Tracks: 2

Construction
- Structure type: Elevated, Double-track
- Platform levels: 2
- Accessible: Yes

Other information
- Status: Staffed, Operational

History
- Opened: 8 March 2026; 5 months ago
- Electrified: 25 kV 50 Hz AC through overhead catenary

Services
Preceding station	Delhi Metro	Following station
Jagatpur - Wazirabad towards Maujpur - Babarpur	Pink Line	Burari towards Maujpur - Babarpur
Route map
Location

The Jharoda Majra metro station is located on the Pink Line of the Delhi Metro. It is one of the ring completion network station of Pink Line, and is the part of Delhi Metro's Phase IV.

== Station layout ==
L2	Side platform | Doors will open on the left
L2	Platform 1 Anticlockwise	"-" Circular Line (Anticlockwise); Via: Burari, Majlis Park, Azadpur, Shalimar Bagh, Netaji Subhash Place, Punjabi Bagh West, Rajouri Garden, Mayapuri, Naraina Vihar, Delhi Cantt., Durgabai Deshmukh South Campus, Sir M. Vishweshwaraiah Moti Bagh, Sarojini Nagar, Dilli Haat - INA, South Extension, Lajpat Nagar; Next Station: Burari
L2	Platform 2 Clockwise	"+" Circular Line (Clockwise); Via: Jagatpur - Wazirabad, Nanaksar - Sonia Vihar, Bhajanpura, Yamuna Vihar, Maujpur - Babarpur, Welcome, Karkarduma, Anand Vihar, IP Extension, Trilokpuri - Sanjay Lake, Shree Ram Mandir Mayur Vihar, Mayur Vihar-I, Sarai Kale Khan - Nizamuddin; Next Station: Jagatpur - Wazirabad
L2	Side platform | Doors will open on the left
L1	Concourse	Fare control, station agent, Metro Card vending machines, crossover
G	Street level	Exit/Entrance

== See also ==
- Delhi Transport Corporation
- List of Delhi Metro stations
- List of railway lines in India
- Transport in Delhi
