= Shakurpur metro station =

Metro station in Delhi, India

Shakurpur

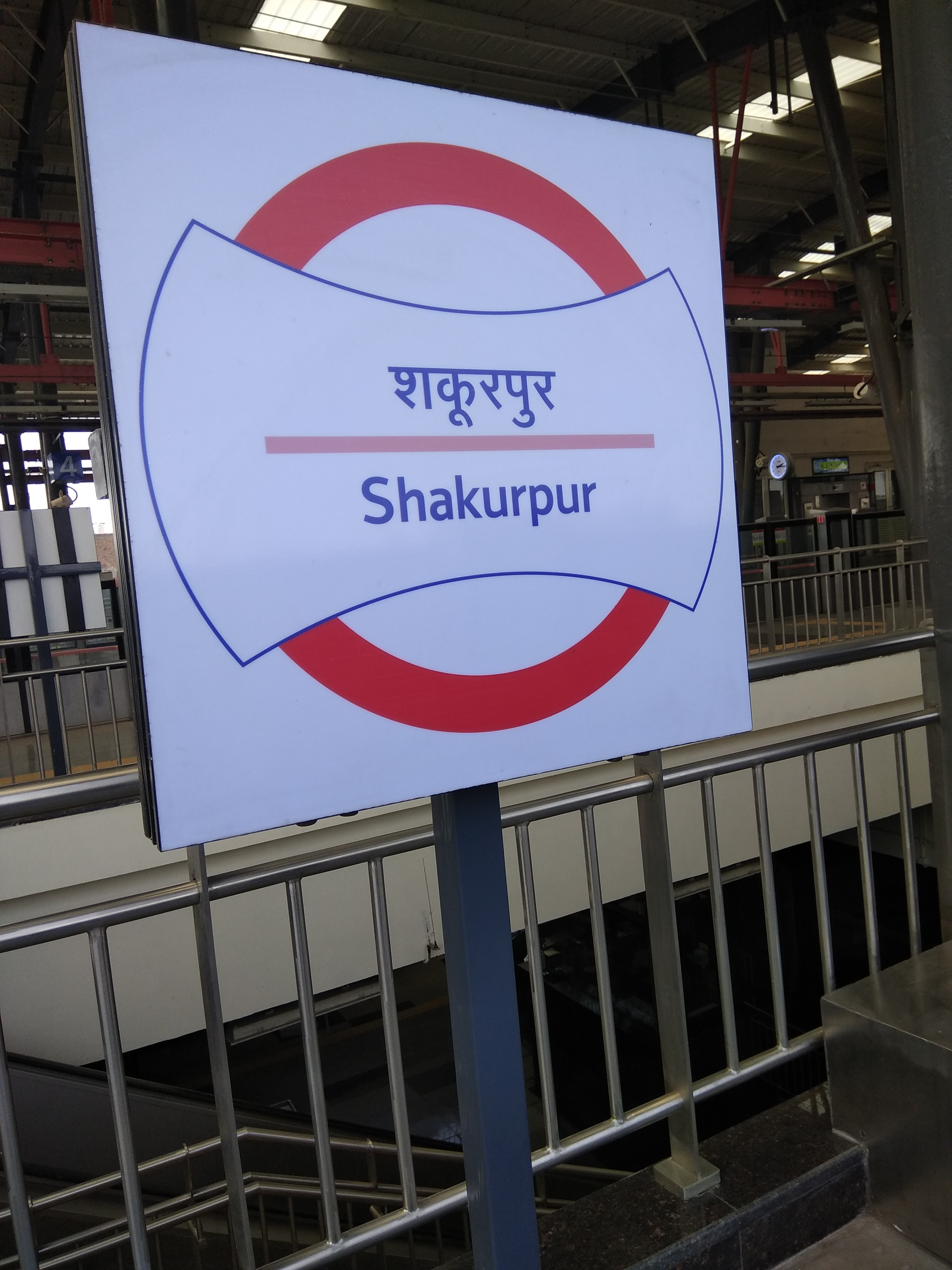

General information
- Location: JJ Colony, Shakurpur Colony, Shakurpur, Delhi, 110034
- Coordinates: 28°41′09″N 77°08′59″E
- System: Delhi Metro station
- Owner: Delhi Metro
- Operator: Delhi Metro Rail Corporation (DMRC)
- Line: Pink Line
- Platforms: Island platform Platform 1 → "-" Circular Line; Platform 2 → "+" Circular Line
- Tracks: 3

Construction
- Structure type: Elevated, quadruple track
- Platform levels: 2
- Parking: no
- Accessible: Yes

Other information
- Status: Staffed, Operational
- Station code: SAKP

History
- Opened: 14 March 2018; 8 years ago
- Electrified: 25 kV 50 Hz AC through overhead catenary

Services
Preceding station	Delhi Metro	Following station
Netaji Subhash Place towards Maujpur - Babarpur	Pink Line	Punjabi Bagh West towards Shiv Vihar
Route map
Location

Shakurpur is a metro station located on the Pink Line of the Delhi Metro.

== Station layout ==
L2	Platform 1 Anticlockwise	"-" Circular Line (Anticlockwise); Via: Punjabi Bagh West, ESI - Basaidarapur, Rajouri Garden, Mayapuri, Naraina Vihar, Delhi Cantonment, Durgabai Deshmukh South Campus, Sir M. Vishweshwaraiah Moti Bagh, Sarojini Nagar, Dilli Haat - INA, South Extension, Lajpat Nagar, Sarai Kale Khan - Nizamuddin, Mayur Vihar-I, Shree Ram Mandir Mayur Vihar, Trilokpuri - Sanjay Lake, IP Extension, Anand Vihar; Next Station: Punjabi Bagh West; Change at the next station for Green Line
L2	Island platform | Doors will open on the right
L2	Platform 2 Clockwise	"+" Circular Line (Clockwise); Via: Netaji Subhash Place, Shalimar Bagh, Azadpur, Majlis Park, Burari, Jagatpur - Wazirabad, Nanaksar - Sonia Vihar, Bhajanpura, Yamuna Vihar, Maujpur - Babarpur, Welcome, Karkarduma; Next Station: Netaji Subhash Place; Change at the next station for Red Line
L1	Concourse	Fare control, station agent
G	Street Level	Exit/Entrance

== Entry/Exit ==
Shakurpur metro station Entry/exits
Gate No-1	Gate No-2
Indira Gandhi Polyclinic, Wazirpur, Prachin Shiv Mandir, Gurudwara Guru Singh Sabha	Shakurpur JJ Colony, Shakurpur Village, Shakurpur Crossing, Brittania Chowk

== See also ==
- Delhi
- List of Delhi Metro stations
- Transport in Delhi
- Delhi Metro Rail Corporation
- Delhi Suburban Railway
- Inner Ring Road, Delhi
- Delhi Monorail
- Delhi Transport Corporation
- North Delhi
- New Delhi
- National Capital Region (India)
- List of rapid transit systems
- List of metro systems
