= ESI - Basaidarapur metro station =

Metro station in Delhi, India

ESI - Basaidarapur

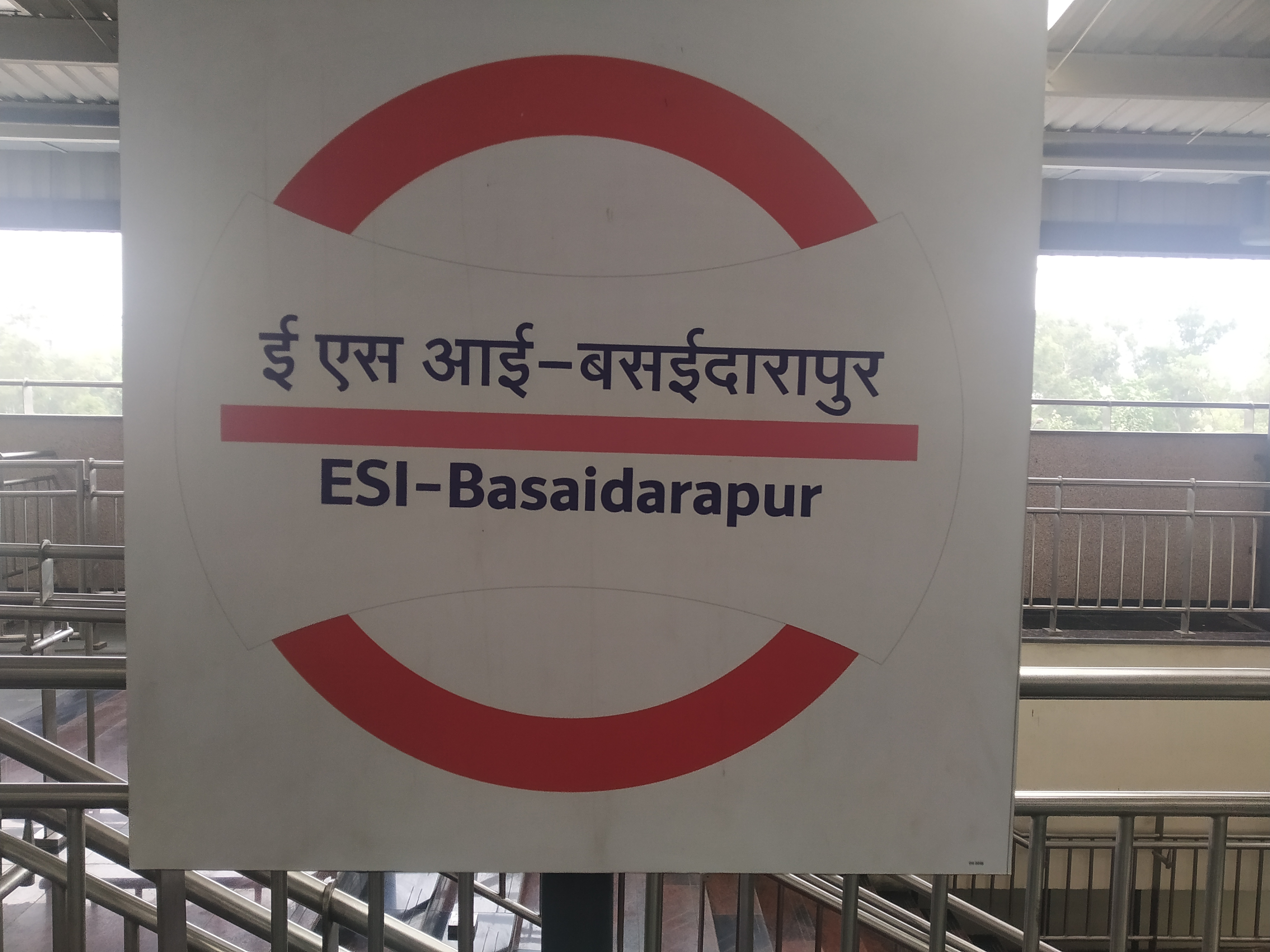

General information
- Location: Shivaji Park (opp. ESI Hospital), near Basai Dara Pur Village, New Delhi, Delhi - 110015, India
- Coordinates: 28°39′30″N 77°07′39″E
- System: Delhi Metro station
- Owner: Delhi Metro
- Operator: Delhi Metro Rail Corporation (DMRC)
- Line: Pink Line
- Platforms: Side platform Platform 1 → "-" Circular Line; Platform 2 → "+" Circular Line
- Tracks: 2

Construction
- Structure type: Elevated, double-track
- Platform levels: 2
- Parking: Yes
- Accessible: Yes

Other information
- Status: Staffed, Operational
- Station code: ESIH

History
- Opened: 14 March 2018; 8 years ago
- Electrified: 25 kV 50 Hz AC through overhead catenary

Services
Preceding station	Delhi Metro	Following station
Punjabi Bagh West towards Maujpur - Babarpur	Pink Line	Rajouri Garden towards Shiv Vihar
Route map
Location

ESI - Basaidarapur is a metro station located on the Pink Line of the Delhi Metro. As a part of Delhi Metro's Phase III, the station was opened on 14 March 2018, as ESI Hospital, but it was later changed to its current name in the same year.

== Station layout ==
L2	Side platform | Doors will open on the left
L2	Platform 1 Anticlockwise	"-" Circular Line (Anticlockwise); Via: Rajouri Garden, Mayapuri, Naraina Vihar, Delhi Cantonment, Durgabai Deshmukh South Campus, Sir M. Vishweshwaraiah Moti Bagh, Sarojini Nagar, Dilli Haat - INA, South Extension, Lajpat Nagar, Sarai Kale Khan - Nizamuddin, Mayur Vihar-I, Shree Ram Mandir Mayur Vihar, Trilokpuri - Sanjay Lake, IP Extension, Anand Vihar, Karkarduma, Welcome; Next Station: Rajouri Garden; Change at the next station for Blue Line
L2	Platform 2 Clockwise	"+" Circular Line (Clockwise); Via: Punjabi Bagh West, Shakurpur, Netaji Subhash Place, Shalimar Bagh, Azadpur, Majlis Park, Burari, Jagatpur - Wazirabad, Nanaksar - Sonia Vihar, Bhajanpura, Yamuna Vihar, Maujpur - Babarpur; Next Station: Punjabi Bagh West; Change at the next station for Green Line
L2	Side platform | Doors will open on the left
L1	Concourse	Fare control, station agent, Metro Card vending machines, crossover
G	Street Level	Exit/Entrance

== Entry/Exit ==
ESI - Basaidarpur metro station Entry/exits
Gate No. 1	Gate No. 2
Rajdhani College	ESI Hospital (adjacent Rajdhani College)
Shivaji College	Punjabi Bagh Club
DM Office, West Delhi	Punjabi Bagh Bus Terminal
Directorate General of Home Guards	Bharat Darshan Park
Chatrapati Shivaji Park	Basaidarapur

== See also ==
- Delhi
- List of Delhi Metro stations
- Transport in Delhi
- Delhi Metro Rail Corporation
- Inner Ring Road, Delhi
- Delhi Monorail
- New Delhi
- National Capital Region (India)
- List of rapid transit systems
- List of metro systems
