= Karkardooma, Delhi =

Karkardooma
- Locality
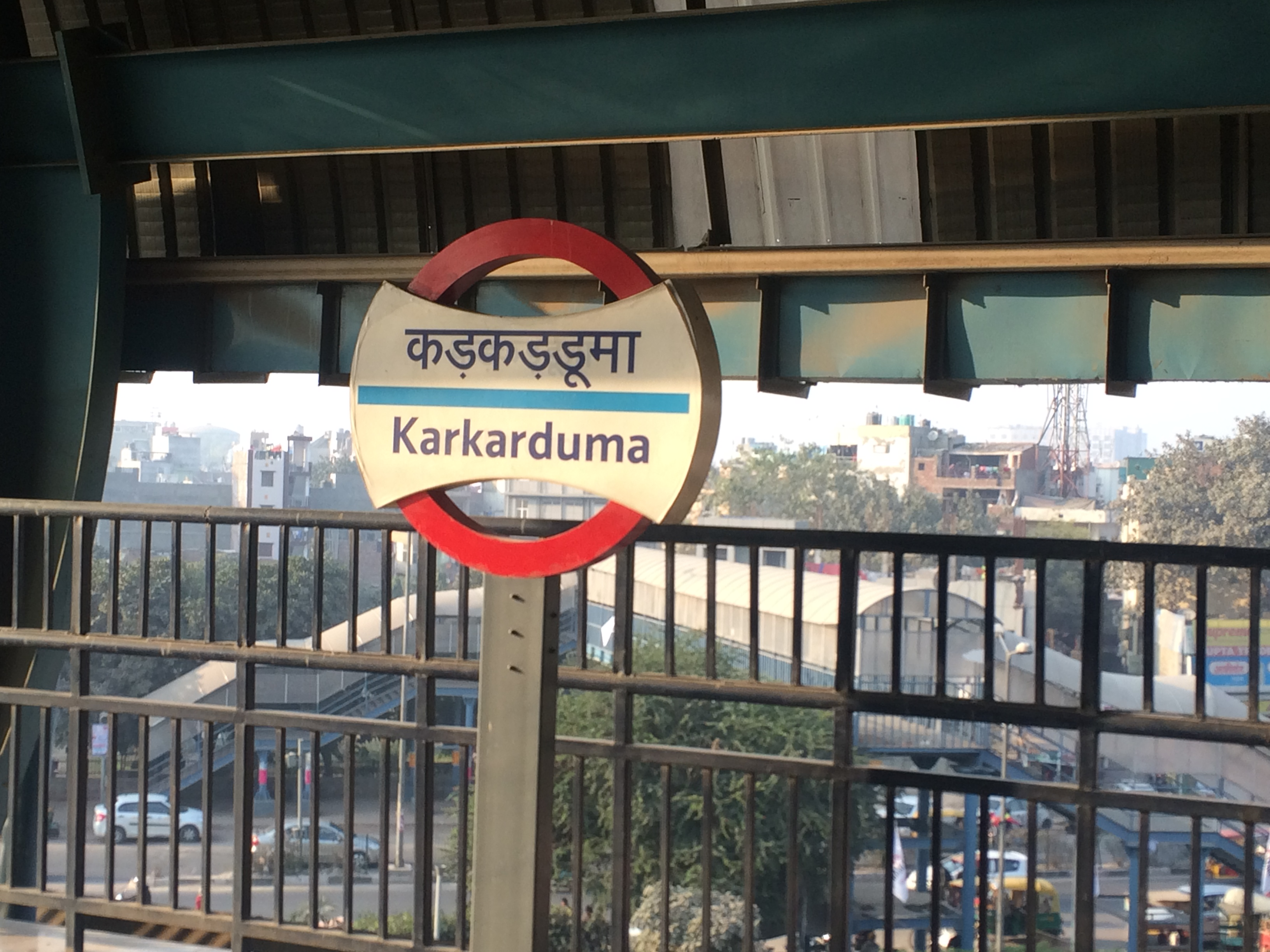

- Location within Delhi
- Coordinates: 28.6529151°N 77.3021027°E
- Country: India
- District: Shahdara
- City: Delhi
- Part of: Anand Vihar

Area
  - Total: 0.76 km^{2} (0.29 sq mi)
- Elevation: 207.0 m (679.1 ft)

Population
  - Total: 21,300
  - Density: 28,086/km^{2} (72,740/sq mi)
  - Small Locality (Karkar Duma): 8,314 (Area: 0.24 square kilometres [0.093 sq mi])
  - Small Locality (Karkar Duma) density: 35,204/km^{2} (91,180/sq mi)

Languages
  - Official: Hindi • English
- Time zone: UTC+5:30 (IST)
- PIN: 110092
- Telephone code: 011
- Vehicle registration: DL-05

Kakardooma /Καρκαρδυμα/ is a locality in Anand Vihar Neighbourhood, Shahdara District, Delhi. The locality has an area of 0.76 square kilometres (0.29 sq mi; 76 ha). It is known for Karkardooma Court.

== Administration ==
- Karkardooma Court

== Transport ==
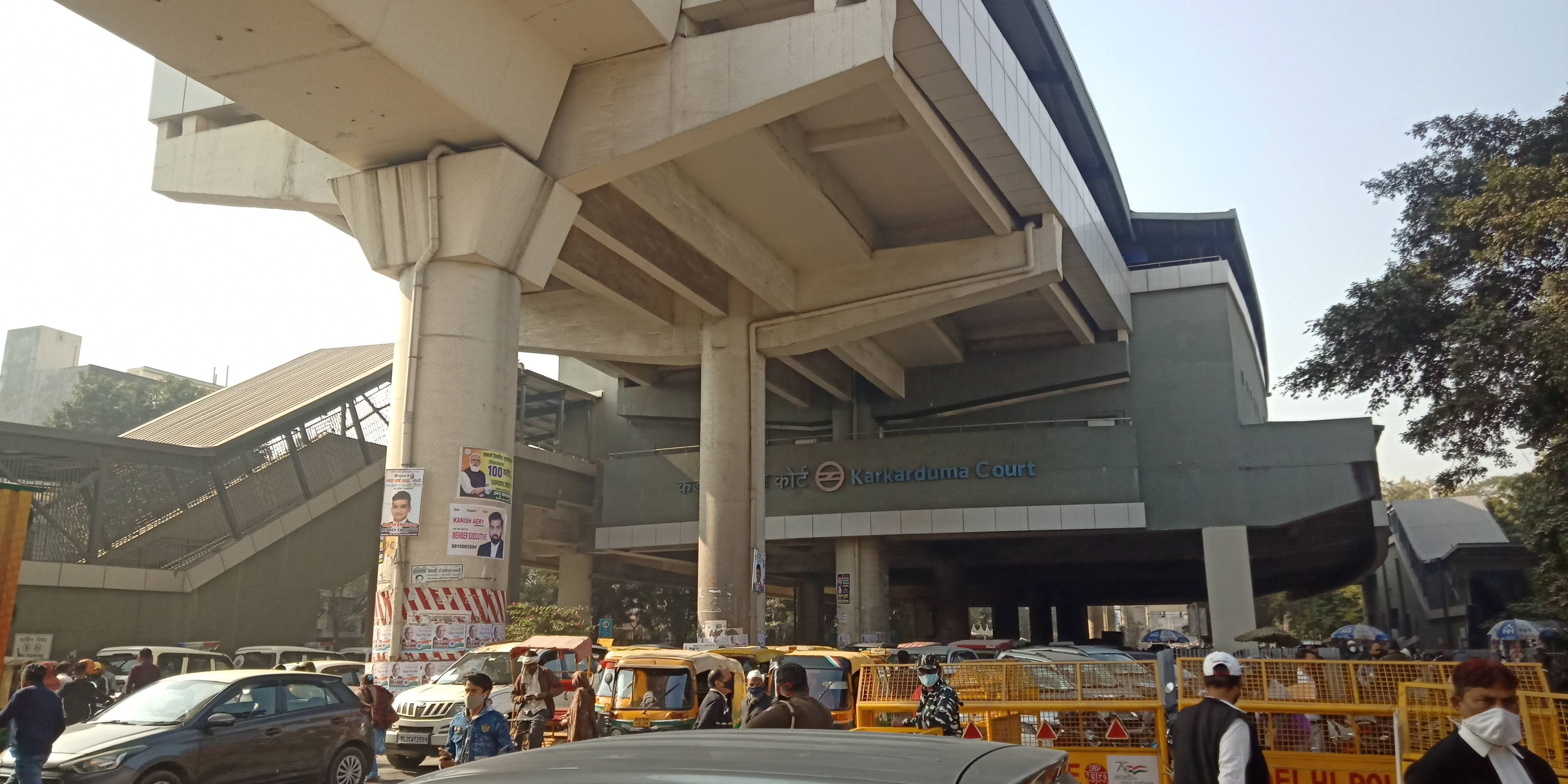
Karkardooma Court Metro Station

Karkardooma Metro Station

Karkardooma Metro Station has 4 platforms; 2 for Pink Line and 2 for Blue Line. This provides connectivity and is convenient for people.

Karkardooma Court Metro Station has 2 platforms. It runs on Pink Line. This provides connectivity for advocates.

=== Bus ===
Nearst Bus terminal is Anand Vihar ISBT. It is 1.0 kilometre (0.62 mi) away. It is well connected by metro.

=== Railway ===
Nearest Railway Station is Anand Vihar Terminal at 0.95 kilometres (0.59 mi) away (aerial). It has 9 platforms. There are 93 originating and 94 terminating.

== Demographics ==
Karkardooma has a population of 21,300 people with 11,238 being males and 10,062 being females. The population density is 28,086 inhabitants per square kilometre (72,740/sq mi).
