= Mayapuri metro station =

Metro station in Delhi, India

Mayapuri

General information
- Location: Satguru Ram Singh Rd, Mayapuri, New Delhi, 110027
- Coordinates: 28°38′14″N 77°07′47″E
- System: Delhi Metro station
- Owner: Delhi Metro
- Operator: Delhi Metro Rail Corporation (DMRC)
- Line: Pink Line
- Platforms: Side platform Platform 1 → "-" Circular Line; Platform 2 → "+" Circular Line
- Tracks: 2

Construction
- Structure type: Elevated, double-track
- Platform levels: 2
- Parking: Available
- Accessible: Yes

Other information
- Status: Staffed, Operational
- Station code: MYPI

History
- Opened: 14 March 2018; 8 years ago
- Electrified: 25 kV 50 Hz AC through overhead catenary

Services
Preceding station	Delhi Metro	Following station
Rajouri Garden towards Maujpur - Babarpur	Pink Line	Naraina Vihar towards Shiv Vihar
Route map
Location

Mayapuri is a metro station located on the Pink Line of the Delhi Metro. As a part of Phase III of Delhi Metro, the station was opened on 14 March 2018.

== Station layout ==
L2	Side platform | Doors will open on the left
L2	Platform 1 Anticlockwise	"-" Circular Line (Anticlockwise); Via: Naraina Vihar, Delhi Cantonment, Durgabai Deshmukh South Campus, Sir M. Vishweshwaraiah Moti Bagh, Bhikaji Cama Place, Sarojini Nagar, Dilli Haat - INA, South Extension, Lajpat Nagar, Sarai Kale Khan - Nizamuddin, Mayur Vihar-I, Shree Ram Mandir Mayur Vihar, Trilokpuri - Sanjay Lake, IP Extension, Anand Vihar, Karkarduma, Welcome, Maujpur - Babarpur, Yamuna Vihar; Next Station: Naraina Vihar
L2	Platform 2 Clockwise	"+" Circular Line (Clockwise); Via: Rajouri Garden, ESI - Basaidarapur, Punjabi Bagh West, Shakurpur, Netaji Subhash Place, Shalimar Bagh, Azadpur, Majlis Park, Burari, Jagatpur - Wazirabad, Nanaksar - Sonia Vihar, Bhajanpura; Next Station: Rajouri Garden; Change at the next station for Blue Line
L2	Side platform | Doors will open on the left
L1	Concourse	Fare control, station agent, Metro Card vending machines, crossover
G	Street Level	Exit/Entrance

== Entry/Exit ==
Mayapuri metro station Entry/exits
Gate No-1	Gate No-2
Braham Kumari Ashram	Government of India Press
Marble Market	Mayapuri DTC Bus Depot
Priyadarshini Park

== See also ==
- Delhi
- List of Delhi Metro stations
- Transport in Delhi
- Delhi Metro Rail Corporation
- Delhi Suburban Railway
- Inner Ring Road, Delhi
- Delhi Monorail
- Mayapuri
- Delhi Transport Corporation
- South Delhi
- New Delhi
- National Capital Region (India)
- List of rapid transit systems
- List of metro systems
