= Punjabi Bagh West metro station =

Metro station in Delhi, India

Punjabi Bagh West

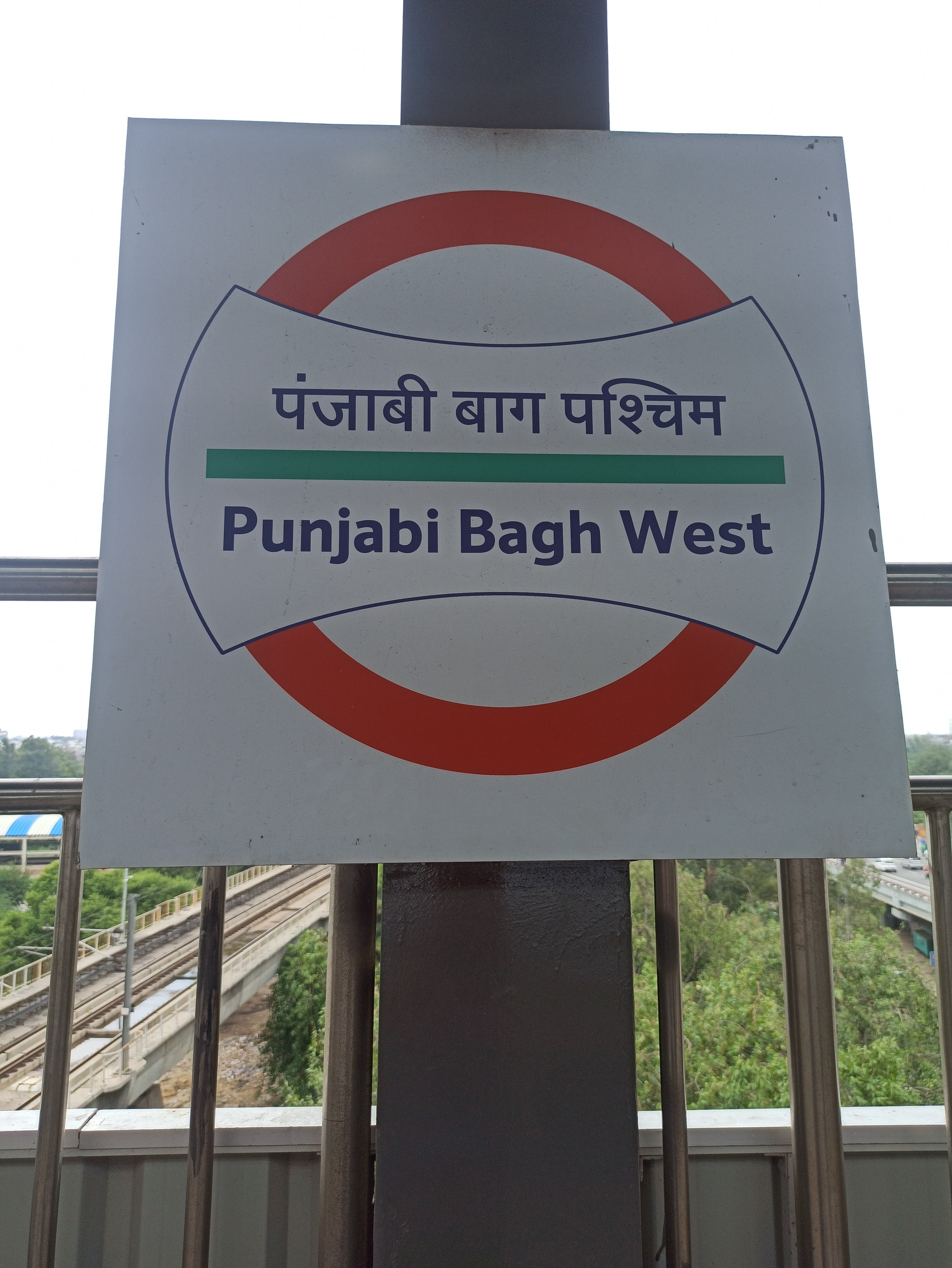

General information
- Location: West Punjabi Bagh, Punjabi Bagh, Delhi, 110026
- Coordinates: 28°40′22″N 77°08′21″E
- System: Delhi Metro station
- Owner: Delhi Metro
- Operator: Delhi Metro Rail Corporation (DMRC)
- Line: Pink Line Green Line
- Platforms: Side platform; Platform 1 → "-" Circular Line; Platform 2 → "+" Circular Line; Platform 3 → Brigadier Hoshiyar Singh; Platform 4 → Inderlok / Kirti Nagar
- Tracks: 4

Construction
- Structure type: Elevated, double-track
- Platform levels: 3
- Accessible: Yes

Other information
- Status: Staffed, Operational
- Station code: PBGW

History
- Opened: 14 March 2018; 8 years ago Pink Line 29 March 2022; 4 years ago Green Line
- Electrified: 25 kV 50 Hz AC through overhead catenary

Services
| Preceding station | Delhi Metro | Following station |
|---|---|---|
| Shakurpur towards Maujpur - Babarpur | Pink Line | ESI - Basaidarapur towards Shiv Vihar |
| Shivaji Park towards Brigadier Hoshiyar Singh | Green Line | Punjabi Bagh East towards Inderlok or Kirti Nagar |
Route map
Location

Punjabi Bagh West is an elevated interchange station on the Pink Line and Green Line of the Delhi Metro. The Pink Line station commenced operations on 14 March 2018, as part of the Majlis Park–Durgabai Deshmukh South Campus section. The Green Line interchange facility became operational on 29 March 2022, when DMRC opened a new halt station on the Green Line to connect the two corridors.

== Construction ==
To provide an interchange between the Green Line and Pink Line, the Delhi Metro Rail Corporation (DMRC) decided to construct steel platforms on the Green Line viaduct between Punjabi Bagh and Shivaji Park stations. The platforms were designed to allow Green Line trains to stop between the two existing stations, enabling passengers to transfer to the Pink Line at Punjabi Bagh West. Construction began after the necessary approvals were obtained from Indian Railways in early 2020. The new Green Line halt station was opened to the public on 29 March 2022, following delays in its construction.

The Green Line halt platforms are connected to Punjabi Bagh West station on the Pink Line through a 212 metres (696 ft) long foot overbridge (FOB). The new platforms are 155 metres (509 ft) long and are equipped with staircases and two extra-large lifts on each platform, each with a capacity of 26 passengers. The FOB provides the interchange connection between the two metro lines.

== Station layout ==
Station layout Pink Line

| L2 | Side platform | Doors will open on the left |
| L2 | Platform 1 Anticlockwise | "-" Circular Line (Anticlockwise); Via: ESI - Basaidarapur, Rajouri Garden, Mayapuri, Naraina Vihar, Delhi Cantonment, Durgabai Deshmukh South Campus, Sir M. Vishweshwaraiah Moti Bagh, Sarojini Nagar, Dilli Haat - INA, South Extension, Lajpat Nagar, Sarai Kale Khan - Nizamuddin, Mayur Vihar-I, Shree Ram Mandir Mayur Vihar, Trilokpuri - Sanjay Lake, IP Extension, Anand Vihar, Karkarduma, Welcome; Next Station: ESI - Basaidarapur |
| L2 | Platform 2 Clockwise | "+" Circular Line (Clockwise); Via: Shakurpur, Netaji Subhash Place, Shalimar Bagh, Azadpur, Majlis Park, Burari, Jagatpur - Wazirabad, Nanaksar - Sonia Vihar, Bhajanpura, Yamuna Vihar, Maujpur - Babarpur; Next Station: Shakurpur |
| L2 | Side platform | Doors will open on the left |
| L1 | Concourse | Fare control, station agent, Metro Card vending machines, crossover |
| G | Street Level | Exit/Entrance |

Station layout Green Line

| L2 | Side platform | Doors will open on the left |
| L2 | Platform 4 Eastbound | Towards → Inderlok / Kirti Nagar; Next Station: Punjabi Bagh |
| L2 | Platform 3 Westbound | Towards ← Brigadier Hoshiyar Singh; Next Station: Shivaji Park |
| L2 | Side platform | Doors will open on the left |
| L1 | Concourse | Fare control, station agent, Metro Card vending machines, crossover |
| G | Street Level | Exit/Entrance |

== Entry/Exit ==
Punjabi Bagh West metro station Entry/exits
| Gate No-1 | Gate No-2 |
|---|---|
| Punjabi Bagh Club; Traffic Training Park; Karampura; ISKCON Punjabi Bagh; Gurudwara Tikana Sahib | Rohtak Road; Punjabi Bagh Chowk; Maharaja Agarsen Hospital; Shri Hans Satsang Bhawan |

== See also ==
- Delhi
- List of Delhi Metro stations
- Transport in Delhi
- Delhi Metro Rail Corporation
- Delhi Suburban Railway
- Inner Ring Road, Delhi
- Delhi Monorail
- Punjabi Bagh
- Delhi Transport Corporation
- West Delhi
- New Delhi
- National Capital Region (India)
- List of rapid transit systems
- List of metro systems
