= Delhi Cantonment metro station =

Metro station in Delhi, India

Delhi Cantonment

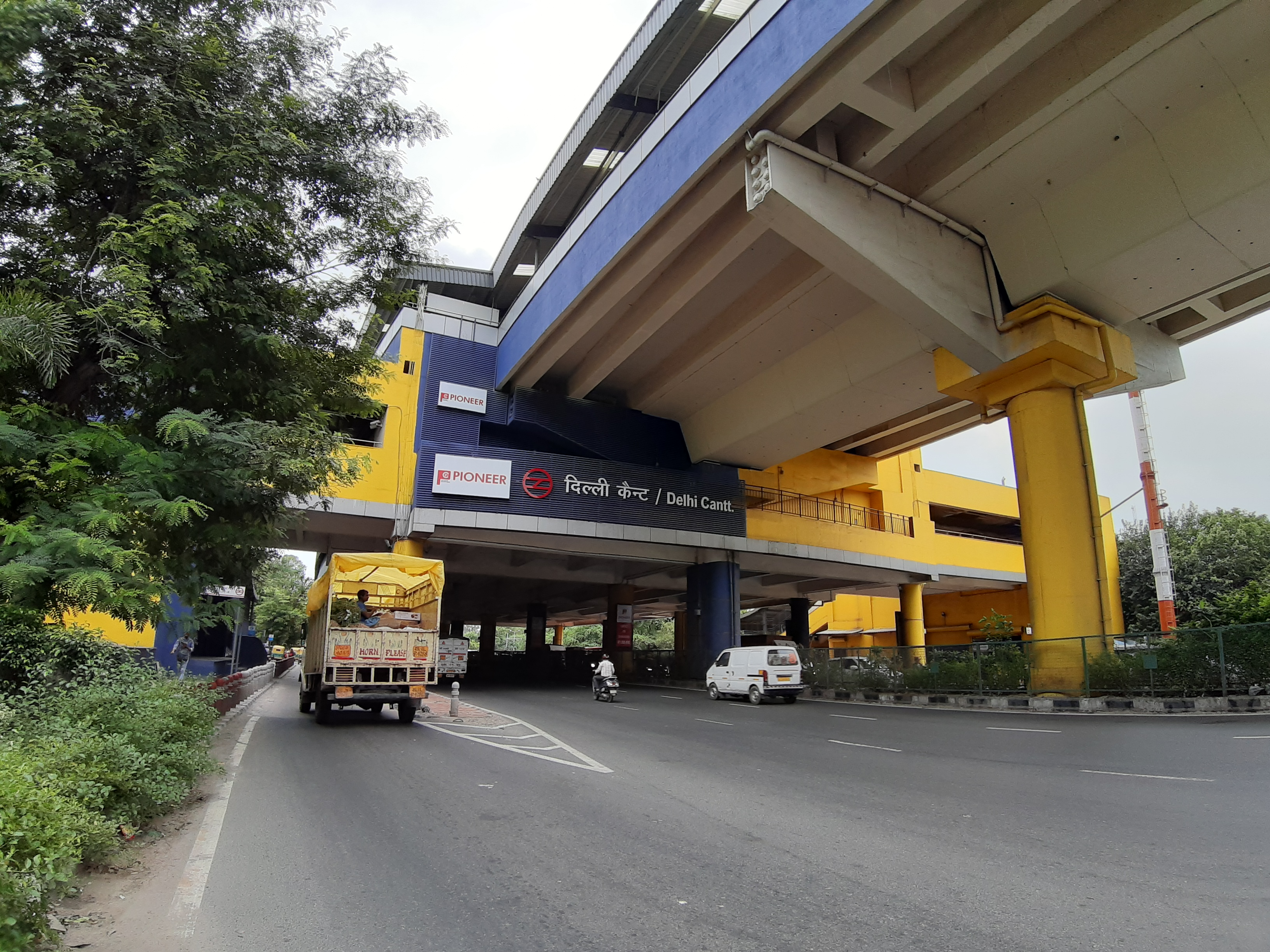

General information
- Location: Hospital Rd, Brar Square, Delhi Cantonment, New Delhi, 110010
- Coordinates: 28°36′31″N 77°08′26″E
- System: Delhi Metro station
- Owner: Delhi Metro
- Operator: Delhi Metro Rail Corporation (DMRC)
- Line: Pink Line
- Platforms: Side platform Platform 1 → "-" Circular Line; Platform 2 → "+" Circular Line
- Tracks: 2

Construction
- Structure type: Elevated, double-track
- Platform levels: 2
- Accessible: Yes

Other information
- Status: Staffed, Operational
- Station code: DLIC

History
- Opened: 14 March 2018; 8 years ago
- Electrified: 25 kV 50 Hz AC through overhead catenary

Services
| Preceding station | Delhi Metro | Following station |
|---|---|---|
| Naraina Vihar towards Maujpur - Babarpur | Pink Line | Durgabai Deshmukh South Campus towards Shiv Vihar |
Route map
Location

Delhi Cantonment is a metro station located on the Pink Line of the Delhi Metro. It has been built as a part of Delhi Metro's Phase III.

== Station layout ==
| L2 | Side platform | Doors will open on the left |
| L2 | Platform 1 Anticlockwise | "-" Circular Line (Anticlockwise); Via: Durgabai Deshmukh South Campus, Sir M. Vishweshwaraiah Moti Bagh, Bhikaji Cama Place, Sarojini Nagar, Dilli Haat - INA, South Extension, Lajpat Nagar, Sarai Kale Khan - Nizamuddin, Mayur Vihar-I, Shree Ram Mandir Mayur Vihar, Trilokpuri - Sanjay Lake, IP Extension, Anand Vihar, Karkarduma, Welcome, Maujpur - Babarpur, Yamuna Vihar, Bhajanpura, Nanaksar - Sonia Vihar; Next Station: Durgabai Deshmukh South Campus; Change at the next station for connecting to Dhaula Kuan under Airport Express |
| L2 | Platform 2 Clockwise | "+" Circular Line (Clockwise); Via: Naraina Vihar, Mayapuri, Rajouri Garden, ESI - Basaidarapur, Punjabi Bagh West, Shakurpur, Netaji Subhash Place, Shalimar Bagh, Azadpur, Majlis Park, Burari, Jagatpur - Wazirabad; Next Station: Naraina Vihar |
| L2 | Side platform | Doors will open on the left |
| L1 | Concourse | Fare control, station agent, Metro Card vending machines, crossover |
| G | Street level | Exit/Entrance |

== Entry/Exit ==
Delhi Cantonment metro station Entry/exits
| Gate No-1 | Gate No-2 |
|---|---|
| Army College of Medical Sciences | Brar Square |
| Base Hospital | Air Force Station |
| | Naraina |

== See also ==
- Delhi
- List of Delhi Metro stations
- Transport in Delhi
- Delhi Metro Rail Corporation
- Delhi Suburban Railway
- Inner Ring Road, Delhi
- Delhi Monorail
- Delhi Transport Corporation
- South Delhi
- New Delhi
- National Capital Region (India)
- List of rapid transit systems
- List of metro systems
