= Naraina Vihar metro station =

Metro station in Delhi, India

Naraina Vihar

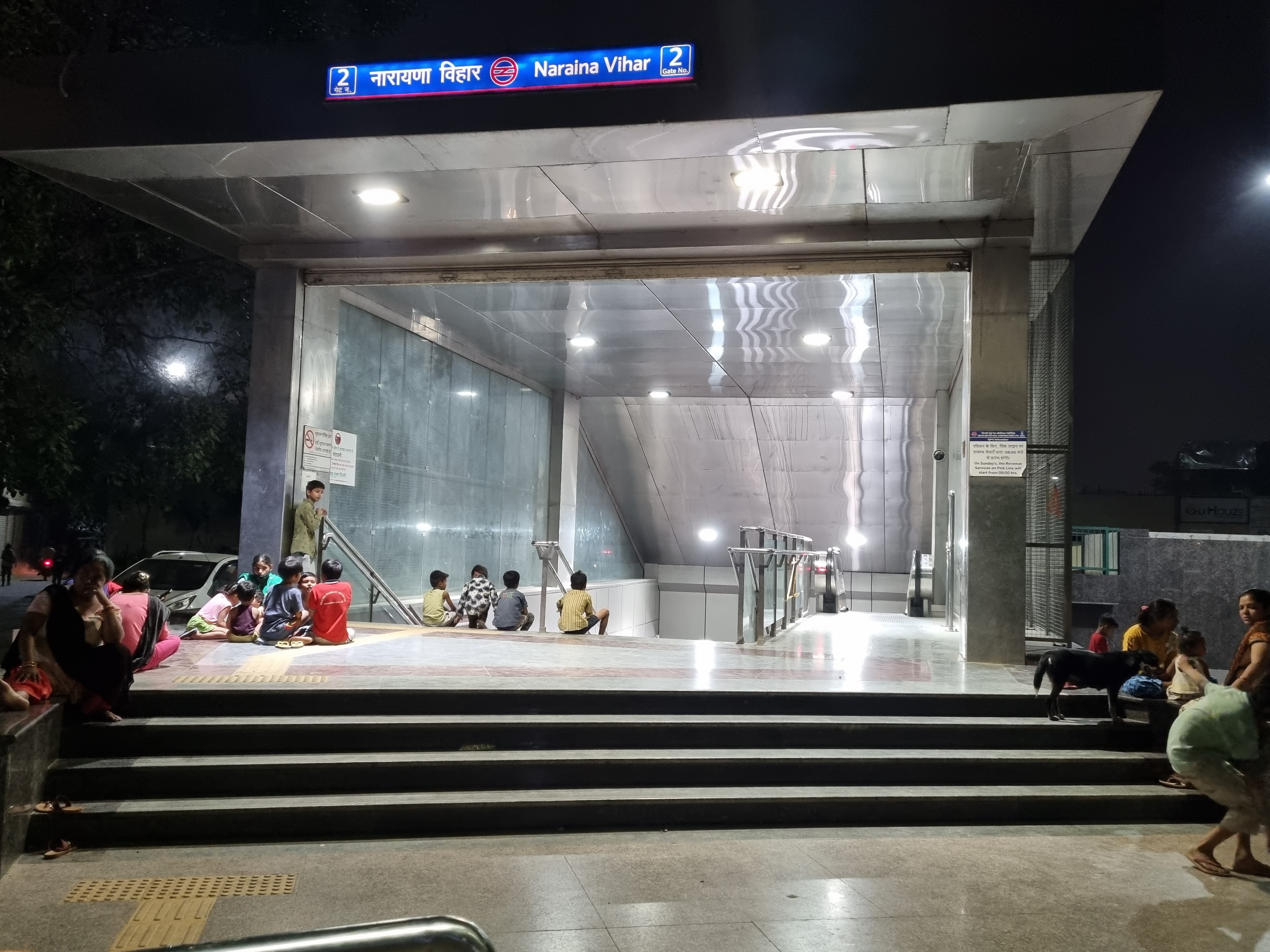

General information
- Location: Shindi Colony, Naraina Village, Naraina, New Delhi - 110028
- Coordinates: 28°37′27″N 77°08′11″E
- System: Delhi Metro station
- Owner: Delhi Metro
- Operator: Delhi Metro Rail Corporation (DMRC)
- Line: Pink Line
- Platforms: Island platform Platform 1 → "-" Circular Line; Platform 2 → "+" Circular Line
- Tracks: 2

Construction
- Structure type: Underground, double-track
- Accessible: Yes

Other information
- Status: Staffed, Operational
- Station code: NAVR

History
- Opened: 14 March 2018; 8 years ago
- Electrified: 25 kV 50 Hz AC through overhead catenary

Services
Preceding station	Delhi Metro	Following station
Mayapuri towards Maujpur - Babarpur	Pink Line	Delhi Cantonment towards Shiv Vihar
Route map
Location

Naraina Vihar is a metro station located on the Pink Line of Delhi Metro. A part of Phase 3, it serves the areas of Naraina Vihar and Naraina Village, and was opened to the public on 14 March 2018.

== History ==
As per the detailed project report of Phase 3, DMRC initially planned to build two elevated metro stations – Naraina 1 and Naraina 2 – on the ring road as part of the Pink Line. However, it later changed this plan and decided to build only one underground station passing directly below the residential colony of Naraina Vihar. This change was strongly opposed by the area's residents, who had petitioned to Delhi's chief minister and other senior officials opposing this move.

Following this, they went to the High Court of Delhi, which in Federation of Naraina Vihar Resident's Welfare Associations vs Union of India & Ors., ruled that the decision taken by DMRC was an executive one and should not be judicially interfered with, particularly since it did not suffer from "any perversity capable of correction without affecting the vital assumptions on which it is based." Accordingly, the petition was dismissed.

== Construction ==
The station is located 18 meters below the ground, and was the first one where both the station box and tunnel had to be constructed by utilizing the same space. This is because DMRC could not acquire enough land to build shafts for lowering the tunnel boring machines. Due to this, it took them 30 days to drag the TBMs over 210 meters, while ensuring that the platform was not damaged.

== Station layout ==
G	Street level	Exit/Entrance
C	Concourse	Fare control, station agent, Ticket/token, shops
P	Platform 1 Anticlockwise	"-" Circular Line (Anticlockwise); Via: Delhi Cantonment, Durgabai Deshmukh South Campus, Sir M. Vishweshwaraiah Moti Bagh, Bhikaji Cama Place, Sarojini Nagar, Dilli Haat - INA, South Extension, Lajpat Nagar, Sarai Kale Khan - Nizamuddin, Mayur Vihar-I, Shree Ram Mandir Mayur Vihar, Trilokpuri - Sanjay Lake, IP Extension, Anand Vihar, Karkarduma, Welcome, Maujpur - Babarpur, Yamuna Vihar, Bhajanpura; Next Station: Delhi Cantonment
P	Island platform | Doors will open on the right
P	Platform 2 Clockwise	"+" Circular Line (Clockwise); Via: Mayapuri, Rajouri Garden, ESI - Basaidarapur, Punjabi Bagh West, Shakurpur, Netaji Subhash Place, Shalimar Bagh, Azadpur, Majlis Park, Burari, Jagatpur - Wazirabad, Nanaksar - Sonia Vihar; Next Station: Mayapuri

== Facilities ==
The station has the following facilities:

- Token vending and automatic vending machines: Multiple machines on the unpaid concourse
- Toilet: A Sulabh toilet on the unpaid concourse

== Entry/Exit ==
Naraina Vihar metro station Entry/exits
Gate No-1	Gate No-2
Behl Hospital	Post Office
Block-B Central Park	Naraina Vihar Village
Naraina Vihar Ring Road	Village Park

== See also ==
- Delhi
- List of Delhi Metro stations
- Transport in Delhi
- Delhi Metro Rail Corporation
- Delhi Suburban Railway
- Inner Ring Road, Delhi
- Naraina Area
- Delhi Monorail
- Delhi Transport Corporation
- South Delhi
- New Delhi
- National Capital Region (India)
- List of rapid transit systems
- List of metro systems
