= Dilli Haat – INA metro station =

Metro station in Delhi, India

Dilli Haat - INA

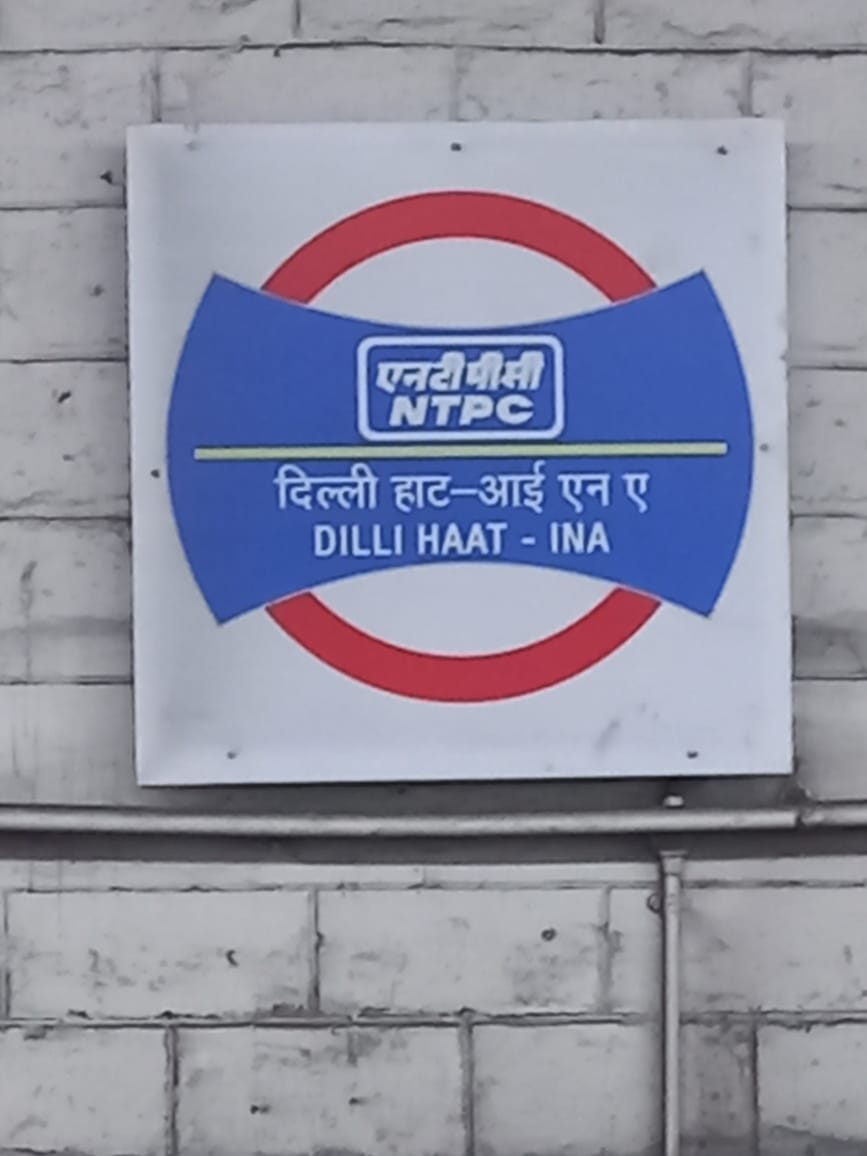

General information
- Location: Sri Aurobindo Marg, INA Colony, New Delhi, Delhi 110023; India
- Coordinates: 28°34′31″N 77°12′26″E
- System: Delhi Metro station
- Owner: Delhi Metro
- Operator: Delhi Metro Rail Corporation (DMRC)
- Line: Yellow Line Pink Line
- Platforms: Island platform; Platform 1 → Millennium City Centre Gurugram; Platform 2 → Samaypur Badli; Platform 3 → "-" Circular Line; Platform 4 → "+" Circular Line
- Tracks: 4

Construction
- Structure type: Underground
- Platform levels: 3
- Accessible: Yes

Other information
- Status: Staffed, Operational
- Station code: INA

History
- Opened: 3 September 2010; 16 years ago Yellow Line; 6 August 2018; 8 years ago Pink Line
- Rebuilt: 2014 – 2018 (Phase III)
- Electrified: 25 kV 50 Hz AC through overhead catenary

Passengers
- October 2016: 40,000

Services
Preceding station	Delhi Metro	Following station
Jor Bagh towards Samaypur Badli	Yellow Line	AIIMS towards Millennium City Centre Gurugram
Sarojini Nagar towards Maujpur - Babarpur	Pink Line	South Extension towards Shiv Vihar
Route map
Location

The Dilli Haat – INA metro station is an interchange station between the Yellow Line and Pink Line of Delhi Metro. Located on the Sri Aurobindo Marg, it serves the areas of INA Colony, Dilli Haat, INA Market, and Kidwai Nagar in southern Delhi.

The station was initially opened to the public on 3 September 2010 as part of the Yellow Line. It became an interchange station with the commencement of Pink Line services on 6 August 2018.

== Station layout ==
G	Street level	Exit/Entrance
L1	Concourse	Fare control, station agent, Ticket/token, shops
L3	Platform 1 Southbound	Towards → Millennium City Centre Gurugram; Next Station: AIIMS
L3	Island platform | Doors will open on the right
L3	Platform 2 Northbound	Towards ← Samaypur Badli; Next Station: Jor Bagh
L2	Platform 3 Anticlockwise	"-" Circular Line (Anticlockwise); Via: South Extension, Lajpat Nagar, Vinobapuri, Ashram, Sarai Kale Khan - Nizamuddin, Mayur Vihar-I, Shree Ram Mandir Mayur Vihar, Trilokpuri - Sanjay Lake, IP Extension, Anand Vihar, Karkarduma, Welcome, Maujpur - Babarpur, Yamuna Vihar, Bhajanpura, Nanaksar - Sonia Vihar, Jagatpur - Wazirabad, Burari, Majlis Park, Azadpur, Shalimar Bagh; Next Station: South Extension
L2	Island platform | Doors will open on the right
L2	Platform 4 Clockwise	"+" Circular Line (Clockwise); Via: Sarojini Nagar, Bhikaji Cama Place, Sir M. Vishweshwaraiah Moti Bagh, Durgabai Deshmukh South Campus, Delhi Cantt., Naraina Vihar, Mayapuri, Rajouri Garden, ESI - Basaidarapur, Punjabi Bagh West, Shakurpur, Netaji Subhash Place; Next Station: Sarojini Nagar

== Entry/Exit ==
Dilli Haat – INA metro station Entry/exits
Gate No-1	Gate No-2	Gate No-3	Gate No-4	Gate No-5	Gate No-6
Dilli Haat / Sri Aurobindo Marg	INA Market	Kidwai Nagar West / Maharaja Agrasen Road	Laxmi Bai Nagar / Sanjay Lake	Dilli Haat	Kidwai Nagar East / INA Market

== See also ==
- Delhi
- List of Delhi Metro stations
- Transport in Delhi
- Delhi Metro Rail Corporation
- Delhi Suburban Railway
- Inner Ring Road, Delhi
- South Extension
- Delhi Monorail
- Delhi Transport Corporation
- South Delhi
- New Delhi
- National Capital Region (India)
- List of rapid transit systems
- List of metro systems
