= Lajpat Nagar metro station =

Metro station in Delhi, India

Lajpat Nagar

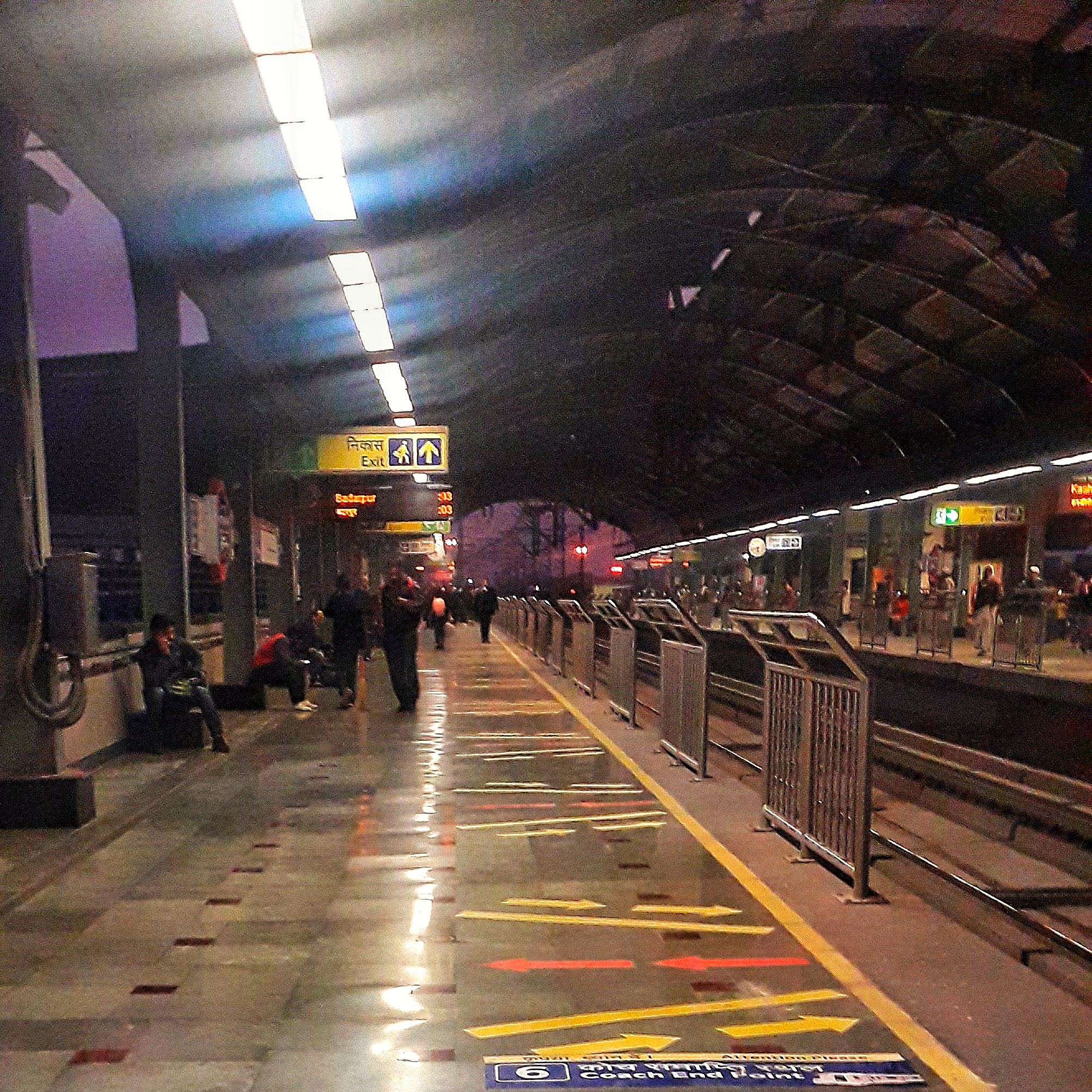
- Lajpat Nagar metro station Platform

General information
- Location: Lala Lajpat Rai Marg, New Delhi 110024, India
- Coordinates: 28°34′14″N 77°14′11″E
- System: Delhi Metro station
- Owner: Delhi Metro
- Operator: Delhi Metro Rail Corporation (DMRC)
- Line: Violet Line Pink Line Golden Line
- Platforms: Side platform Violet Line; Platform 1 → Raja Nahar Singh (Ballabhgarh); Platform 2 → Kashmere Gate; Island Platform Pink Line; Platform 3 → "-" Circular Line; Platform 4 → "+" Circular Line
- Tracks: 4

Construction
- Structure type: Violet Line - Elevated; Pink Line - Underground
- Platform levels: 2
- Parking: Available
- Accessible: Yes

Other information
- Station code: LJPN

History
- Opened: 3 October 2010; 16 years ago Violet Line; 6 August 2018; 8 years ago Pink Line
- Electrified: 25 kV 50 Hz AC through overhead catenary

Passengers
- October 2019: 65,330
- October 2023: 78,218 ▲19.73%

Services
Preceding station	Delhi Metro	Following station
Jangpura towards Kashmere Gate	Violet Line	Moolchand towards Raja Nahar Singh (Ballabhgarh)
South Extension towards Maujpur - Babarpur	Pink Line	Vinobapuri towards Shiv Vihar
Future service
Terminus	Golden Line	Andrews Ganj towards Kalindi Kunj via Saket G Block
Route map
Location

Lajpat Nagar is an interchange station between the Violet Line and Pink Line of the Delhi Metro, located in the Lajpat Nagar neighbourhood of Delhi. On the Violet Line, it lies between Jangpura and Moolchand. The station opened on 3 October 2010 as part of the Central Secretariat–Sarita Vihar section of the Violet Line, on the day of the opening ceremony of the 2010 Commonwealth Games.

It became an interchange station with the opening of the Pink Line on 6 August 2018. The Pink Line station is underground, while the Violet Line station is elevated. The two stations are connected by a foot-overbridge within the paid area, allowing passengers to interchange without exiting the ticketed area.

Lajpat Nagar Central Market, one of Delhi's popular shopping destinations, is located within walking distance of the metro station. The market is known for its clothing, footwear, artificial jewellery, furnishing materials, household goods and home décor shops. Cycle rickshaws and e-rickshaws are also available near the station for local transportation.

== Facilities ==
HDFC Bank, SBI, RBL Bank ATMs, food court are available at Lajpat Nagar metro station.

== Station layout ==
L2	Side platform | Doors will open on the left
L2	Platform 1 Southbound	Towards → Raja Nahar Singh (Ballabhgarh); Next Station: Moolchand
L2	Platform 2 Northbound	Towards ← Kashmere Gate; Next Station: Jangpura
L2	Side platform | Doors will open on the left
L1	Concourse	Fare control, station agent, Metro Card vending machines, crossover
G	Street level	Exit/Entrance
UG Level-1	Concourse	Fare control, station agent, Metro Card vending machines, crossover
UG Level-2	Platform 3 Anticlockwise	"-" Circular Line (Anticlockwise); Via: Vinobapuri, Ashram, Sarai Kale Khan - Nizamuddin, Mayur Vihar-I, Shree Ram Mandir Mayur Vihar, Trilokpuri - Sanjay Lake, IP Extension, Anand Vihar, Karkarduma, Welcome, Maujpur - Babarpur, Yamuna Vihar, Bhajanpura, Nanaksar - Sonia Vihar, Jagatpur - Wazirabad, Burari, Majlis Park, Azadpur, Shalimar Bagh, Netaji Subhash Place; Next Station: Vinobapuri
UG Level-2	Island platform | Doors will open on the left
UG Level-2	Platform 4 Clockwise	"+" Circular Line (Clockwise); Via: South Extension, Dilli Haat - INA, Sarojini Nagar, Bhikaji Cama Place, Sir M. Vishweshwaraiah Moti Bagh, Durgabai Deshmukh South Campus, Delhi Cantt., Naraina Vihar, Mayapuri, Rajouri Garden, ESI - Basaidarapur, Punjabi Bagh West; Next Station: South Extension

== Nearby ==
Notable places in the vicinity of the station include Lajpat Nagar Central Market, Amar Colony, Defence Colony and Guru Nanak Market. The area also has several educational institutions, including Rajkumari Amrit Kaur College of Nursing and government schools in Lajpat Nagar.

== See also ==
- Delhi
- List of Delhi Metro stations
- Transport in Delhi
- Delhi Monorail
- South Delhi
- New Delhi
- National Capital Region (India)
- List of rapid transit systems
- List of metro systems
