= Karkarduma metro station =

Metro station in Delhi, India

Karkarduma

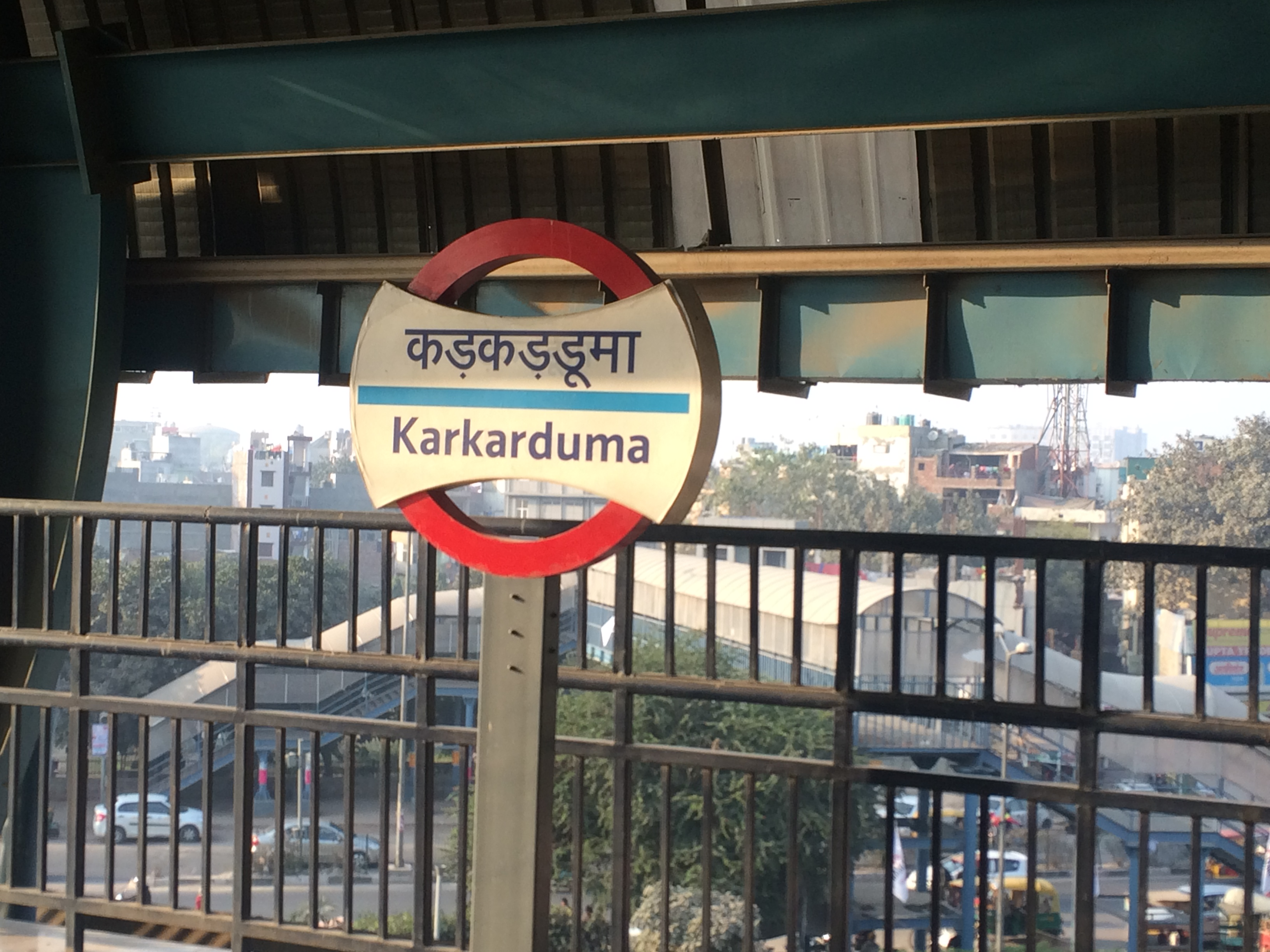

General information
- Location: Bhartendu Harish Chandra Marg, Arya Nagar, Karkardooma, Delhi
- Coordinates: 28°38′55″N 77°18′20″E
- System: Delhi Metro station
- Owner: Delhi Metro
- Operator: Delhi Metro Rail Corporation
- Line: Blue Line Pink Line
- Platforms: Side Platform; Platform 1 → Vaishali; Platform 2 → Dwarka Sector 21; Platform 3 → "-" Circular Line; Platform 4 → "+" Circular Line
- Tracks: 4

Construction
- Structure type: Elevated, Double-track
- Platform levels: 2
- Parking: Available
- Accessible: Yes

Other information
- Status: Staffed, Operational
- Station code: KKDA

History
- Opened: 6 January 2010; 16 years ago Blue Line; 31 October 2018; 8 years ago Pink Line
- Electrified: 25 kV 50 Hz AC through overhead catenary

Services
Preceding station	Delhi Metro	Following station
Preet Vihar towards Dwarka Sector 21	Blue Line	Anand Vihar towards Vaishali
Anand Vihar towards Maujpur - Babarpur	Pink Line	Karkarduma Court towards Maujpur - Babarpur
Route map
Location

Karkarduma is an interchange station on the Blue Line and Pink Line of the Delhi Metro. The Blue Line station opened on 6 January 2010, while the Pink Line station commenced passenger operations on 31 October 2018. The Blue Line station is situated 14.5 metres (48 ft) above ground level. The Pink Line station, constructed as part of the Majlis Park–Shiv Vihar corridor under Phase III, stands approximately 21 metres (69 ft) above ground level. It was the second-highest station in the Delhi Metro network when it opened, after Dhaula Kuan.

The station is named after the Karkardooma locality in East Delhi. According to a local account reported by Hindustan Times, the name originated from a twin village called Karkari, which existed across the border in present-day Uttar Pradesh and was inhabited by members of the Dom or Dum community. The locality is also home to the Karkardooma Courts Complex, whose building was completed in 1997–98. The complex had begun functioning on 15 May 1993.

== Station layout ==
Station layout Blue Line

L2	Side platform | Doors will open on the left
L2	Platform 1 Eastbound	Towards → Vaishali; Next Station: Anand Vihar; Change at the next station for Pink Line
L2	Platform 2 Westbound	Towards ← Dwarka Sector 21; Next Station: Preet Vihar
L2	Side platform | Doors will open on the left
L1	Concourse	Fare control, station agent, Metro Card vending machines, crossover
G	Street level	Exit/Entrance

Station layout Pink Line

L2	Side platform | Doors will open on the left
L2	Platform 3 Anticlockwise	"-" Circular Line (Anticlockwise); Via: Karkarduma Court, Krishna Nagar, East Azad Nagar, Welcome, Jaffrabad, Maujpur - Babarpur, Yamuna Vihar, Bhajanpura, Khajuri Khas, Nanaksar - Sonia Vihar, Jagatpur - Wazirabad, Burari, Majlis Park, Azadpur, Shalimar Bagh, Netaji Subhash Place, Punjabi Bagh West, Rajouri Garden, Mayapuri, Naraina Vihar; Next Station: Karkarduma Court
L2	Platform 4 Clockwise	"+" Circular Line (Clockwise); Via: Anand Vihar, IP Extension, Trilokpuri - Sanjay Lake, Shree Ram Mandir Mayur Vihar, Mayur Vihar-I, Sarai Kale Khan - Nizamuddin, Lajpat Nagar, South Extension, Dilli Haat - INA, Sarojini Nagar, Sir M. Vishweshwaraiah Moti Bagh, Durgabai Deshmukh South Campus, Delhi Cantt. Next Station: Anand Vihar; Change at the next station for Blue Line
L2	Side platform | Doors will open on the left
L1	Concourse	Fare control, station agent, Metro Card vending machines, crossover
G	Street level	Exit/Entrance

== See also ==
- Delhi
- List of Delhi Metro stations
- Transport in Delhi
- Delhi Metro Rail Corporation
- Delhi Suburban Railway
- Delhi Monorail
- Anand Vihar Terminal railway station
- Delhi Transport Corporation
- East Delhi
- New Delhi
- National Capital Region (India)
- List of rapid transit systems
- List of metro systems
