= Rajouri Garden metro station =

Metro station in Delhi, India

Rajouri Garden राजौरी गार्डन

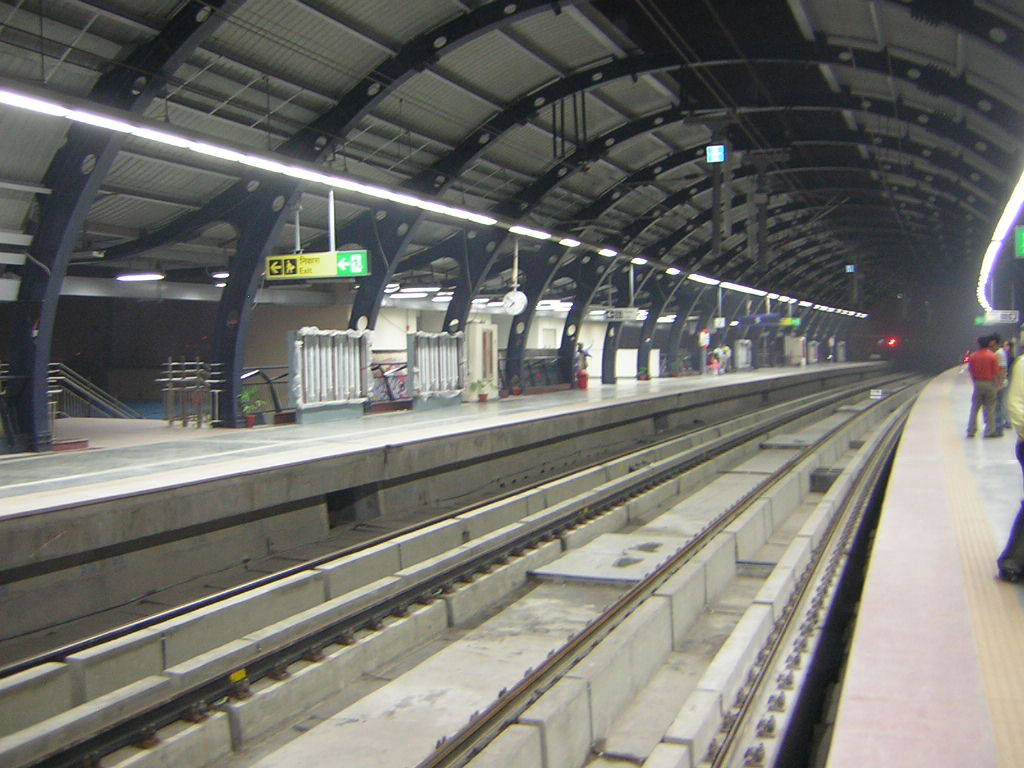

General information
- Location: Najafgarh Road, Shivaji Place/Vishal Enclave, Rajouri Garden, New Delhi, Delhi, 110027
- Coordinates: 28°38′56″N 77°07′21″E
- System: Delhi Metro station
- Owner: Delhi Metro
- Line: Blue Line Pink Line
- Platforms: Side platform; Platform 1 → Noida Electronic City / Vaishali; Platform 2 → Dwarka Sector 21; Platform 3 → "-" Circular Line; Platform 4 → "+" Circular Line
- Tracks: 4

Construction
- Structure type: Elevated
- Platform levels: 2
- Parking: Available
- Accessible: Yes

Other information
- Station code: RG

History
- Opened: 31 December 2005; 20 years ago Blue Line 14 March 2018; 8 years ago Pink Line
- Electrified: 25 kV 50 Hz AC through overhead catenary

Services
Preceding station	Delhi Metro	Following station
Tagore Garden towards Dwarka Sector 21	Blue Line	Ramesh Nagar towards Noida Electronic City or Vaishali
ESI - Basaidarapur towards Maujpur - Babarpur	Pink Line	Mayapuri towards Shiv Vihar
Route map
Location

Rajouri Garden is an interchange metro station between the Blue Line and the Pink Line of the Delhi Metro.

== History ==
The Rajouri Garden metro station was originally opened on 31 December 2005 as part of the Blue Line (then Line 3) of the Delhi Metro. A second station serving the Pink Line was constructed as part of Phase III of the network. During its construction, DMRC installed a 60-metre-long prefabricated steel bridge beneath the existing Blue Line viaduct in August 2015 to connect the two stations. The Pink Line station became operational on 14 March 2018, providing an interchange between the two lines. The stations are connected by a 300-metre-long foot overbridge equipped with moving walkways.

== Station layout ==
Station layout Blue Line

L2	Side platform | Doors will open on the left
L2	Platform 1 Eastbound	Towards → Noida Electronic City / Vaishali; Next Station: Ramesh Nagar
L2	Platform 2 Westbound	Towards ← Dwarka Sector 21; Next Station: Tagore Garden
L2	Side platform | Doors will open on the left
L1	Concourse	Fare control, station agent, Metro Card vending machines, crossover
G	Street Level	Exit/Entrance

Station layout Pink Line

L2	Side platform | Doors will open on the left
L2	Platform 3 Anticlockwise	"-" Circular Line (Anticlockwise); Via: Mayapuri, Naraina Vihar, Delhi Cantonment, Durgabai Deshmukh South Campus, Sir M. Vishweshwaraiah Moti Bagh, Bhikaji Cama Place, Sarojini Nagar, Dilli Haat - INA, South Extension, Lajpat Nagar, Sarai Kale Khan - Nizamuddin, Mayur Vihar-I, Shree Ram Mandir Mayur Vihar, Trilokpuri - Sanjay Lake, IP Extension, Anand Vihar, Karkarduma, Welcome, Maujpur - Babarpur; Next Station: Mayapuri
L2	Platform 4 Clockwise	"+" Circular Line (Clockwise); Via: ESI - Basaidarapur, Punjabi Bagh West, Shakurpur, Netaji Subhash Place, Shalimar Bagh, Azadpur, Majlis Park, Burari, Jagatpur - Wazirabad, Nanaksar - Sonia Vihar, Bhajanpura, Yamuna Vihar; Next Station: ESI - Basaidarapur
L2	Side platform | Doors will open on the left
L1	Concourse	Fare control, station agent, Metro Card vending machines, crossover
G	Street Level	Exit/Entrance

== See also ==
- List of Delhi Metro stations
- Transport in Delhi
