= Anand Vihar metro station =

Metro station in Delhi, India

Anand Vihar

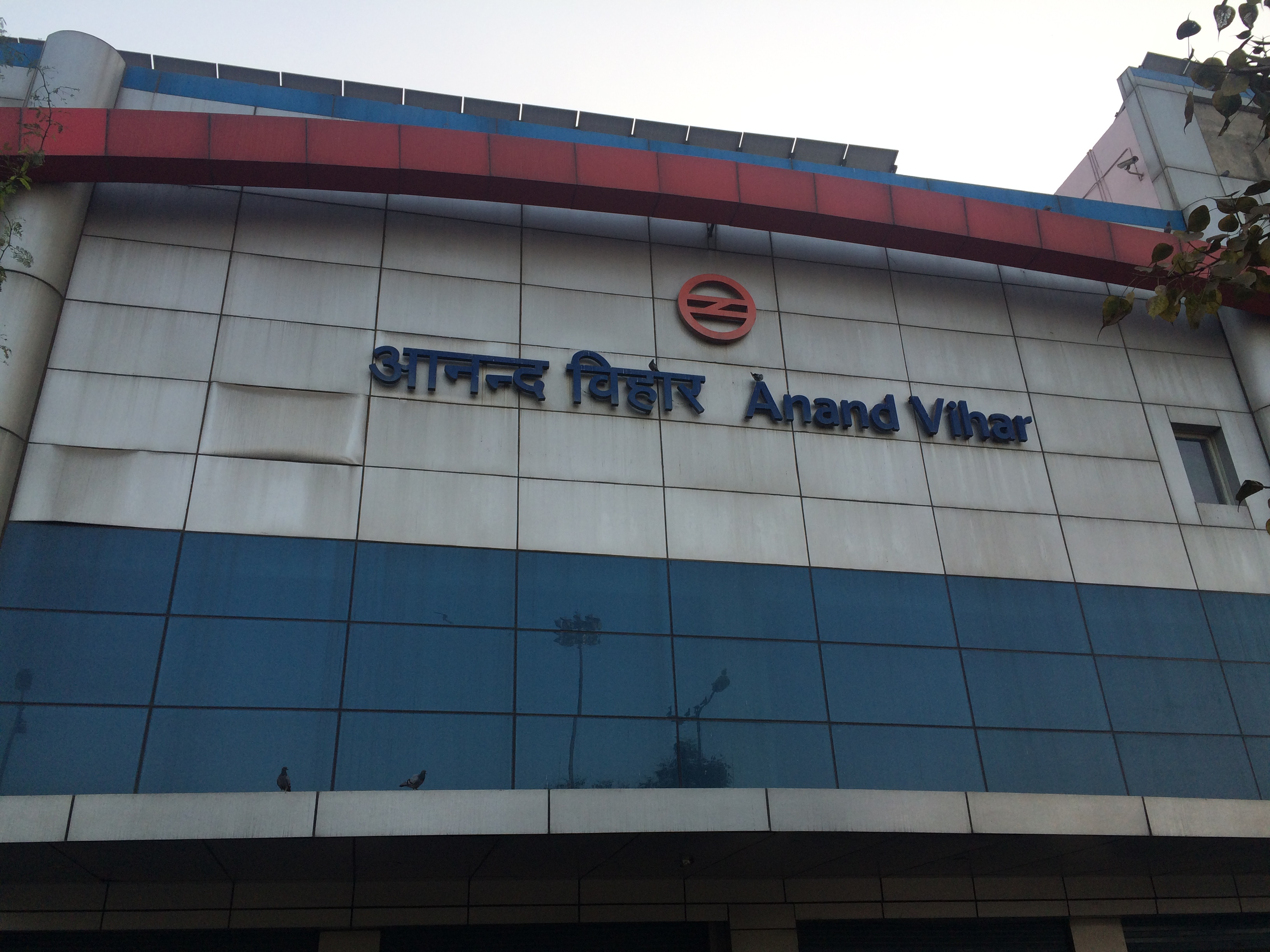
- Main entrance of Anand Vihar metro station

General information
- Location: Isbt Anand Vihar, Anand Vihar, New Delhi, Delhi, 110092
- Coordinates: 28°38′49″N 77°18′57″E
- System: Delhi Metro station
- Owner: Delhi Metro
- Operator: Delhi Metro Rail Corporation (DMRC)
- Line: Blue Line Pink Line
- Platforms: Side Platform; Platform 1 → Vaishali; Platform 2 → Dwarka Sector 21; Platform 3 → "-" Circular Line; Platform 4 → "+" Circular Line
- Tracks: 4
- Connections: Anand Vihar; Anand Vihar Terminal; Anand Vihar ISBT

Construction
- Structure type: Elevated, Double-track
- Accessible: Yes

Other information
- Status: Staffed, Operational
- Station code: AVIT

History
- Opened: 6 January 2010; 16 years ago Blue Line; 31 October 2018; 8 years ago Pink Line
- Electrified: 25 kV 50 Hz AC through overhead catenary

Passengers
- October 2019: 58,518
- October 2023: 73,361 ▲25.37%

Services
Preceding station	Delhi Metro	Following station
Karkarduma towards Dwarka Sector 21	Blue Line	Kaushambi towards Vaishali
IP Extension towards Maujpur - Babarpur	Pink Line	Karkarduma towards Maujpur - Babarpur
Route map
Location

Anand Vihar is an interchange metro station located on the Blue and Pink lines of the Delhi Metro. Anand Vihar served as the eastern terminus of the Blue Line branch (Line 4) until 13 July 2011. The station is situated in the locality of Anand Vihar, near the interstate border between Delhi and Uttar Pradesh, and functions as a major connectivity hub for East Delhi. It is seamlessly integrated with the Anand Vihar ISBT and the Anand Vihar Terminal of Indian Railways. The Anand Vihar Namo Bharat (RapidX) station further enhances connectivity, providing faster transit options to neighbouring cities and strengthening intermodal transportation links in the region.

== Station layout ==
Station layout Blue Line

L2	Side platform | Doors will open on the left
L2	Platform 1 Eastbound	Towards → Vaishali; Next Station: Kaushambi (Delhi-UP border)
L2	Platform 2 Westbound	Towards ← Dwarka Sector 21; Next Station: Karkarduma; Change at the next station for Pink Line
L2	Side platform | Doors will open on the left
L1	Concourse	Fare control, station agent, token vending and automatic vending machines, crossover
G	Street Level	Gates

Station layout Pink Line

L2	Side platform | Doors will open on the left
L2	Platform 3 Anticlockwise	"-" Circular Line (Anticlockwise); Via: Karkarduma, Karkarduma Court, Krishna Nagar, East Azad Nagar, Welcome, Jaffrabad, Maujpur - Babarpur, Yamuna Vihar, Bhajanpura, Khajuri Khas, Nanaksar - Sonia Vihar, Jagatpur - Wazirabad, Burari, Majlis Park, Azadpur, Shalimar Bagh, Netaji Subhash Place, Punjabi Bagh West, Rajouri Garden, Mayapuri, Naraina Vihar; Next Station: Karkarduma; Change at the next station for Blue Line
L2	Platform 4 Clockwise	"+" Circular Line (Clockwise); Via: IP Extension, Mandawali - West Vinod Nagar, East Vinod Nagar - Mayur Vihar-II, Trilokpuri - Sanjay Lake, Shree Ram Mandir Mayur Vihar, Mayur Vihar-I, Sarai Kale Khan - Nizamuddin, Lajpat Nagar, South Extension, Dilli Haat - INA, Sarojini Nagar, Sir M. Vishweshwaraiah Moti Bagh, Durgabai Deshmukh South Campus, Delhi Cantt. Next Station: IP Extension
L2	Side platform | Doors will open on the left
L1	Concourse	Fare control, station agent, token vending and automatic vending machines, crossover
G	Street Level	Gates

== Exits ==
Anand Vihar station entry/exits
Gate No-1	Gate No-2	Gate No-3
Towards Anand Vihar ISBT	In front of Anand Vihar ISBT Near MCD Toll (Delhi-UP)	Between Anand Vihar ISBT and Railway station

== Connections ==
=== Bus ===
- DTC buses:
  - The station is located close to Anand Vihar ISBT, which provides convenient transit to different regions. DTC and cluster buses of Delhi along with buses to Uttar Pradesh and Uttarakhand are available from here.
  - DTC bus routes number 0GL-23, 0OMS(+), 33, 33A, 33EXT, 33C, 33LINKSTL, 33LNKSTL, 33LSTL, 39A, 73, 73LNKSTL, 85, 85AEXT, 85EXT, 88A, 143, 165, 165A, 202, 212, 221, 0236, 236, 236EXT, 243A, 243B, 311A, 333, 341, 357A, 396, 469, 534, 534A, 534C, 542, 543A, 0534A, 543, 543STL, 623A, 623ACL, 624A, 624ACL, 624BLNKSTL, 723, 740, 740A, 740B, 740EXT, 857, 939, 943, 971, 971A, AC-534, AC-971A, AC-Anand Vihar ISBT Terminal - Gurugram Bus Stand, AC-GL-23, Anand Vihar ISBT Terminal - Gurugram Bus Stand, GL-22, GL-23, GL23, OMS(+), OMS(-), OMS(+) AC, YMS(-) and YMS(+) serve the station from nearby Maharajpur Check Post bus stop.

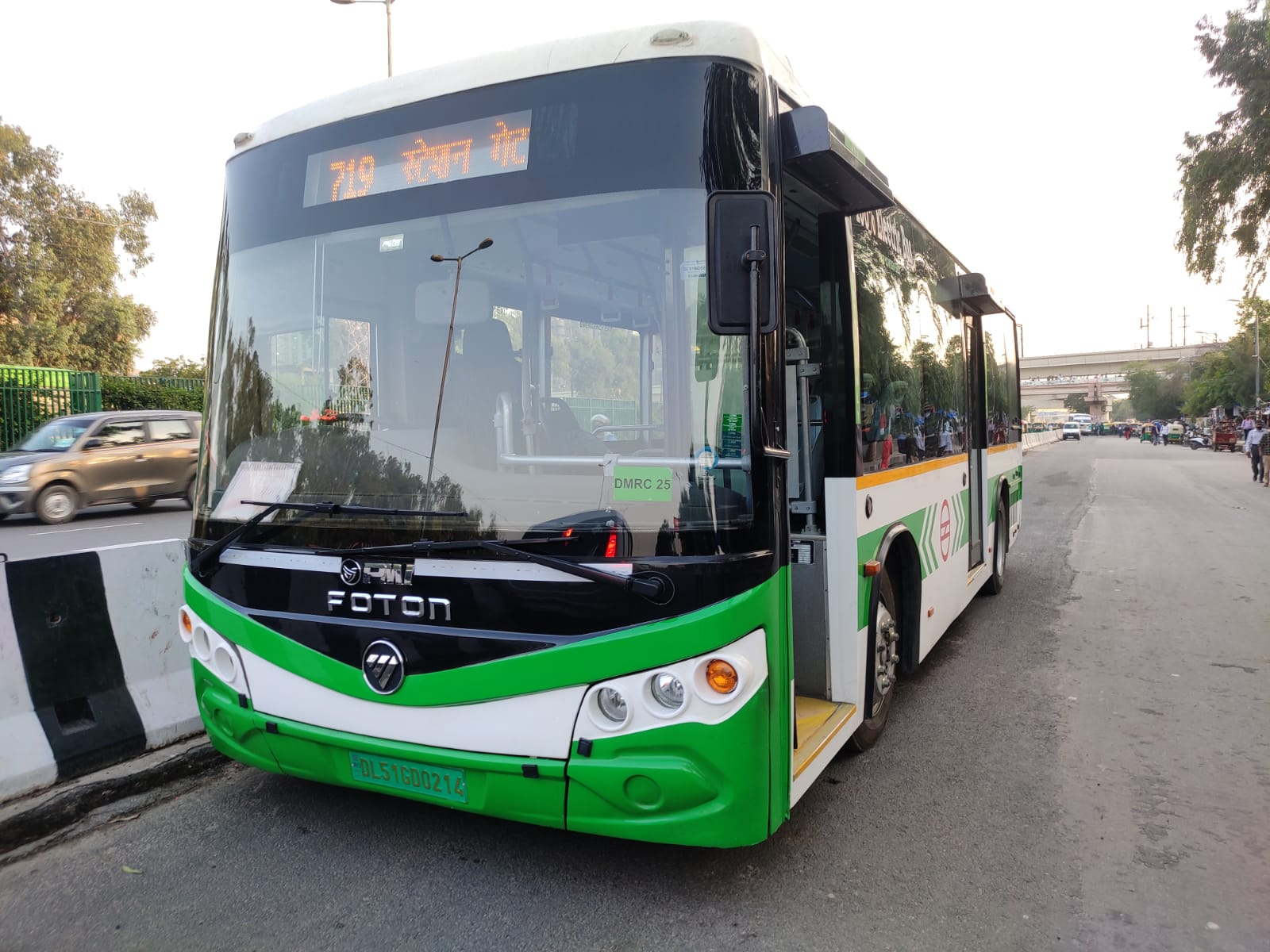
A Delhi Metro electric feeder bus at the Anand Vihar metro station

- Delhi Metro feeder buses:
  - Electric AC Feeder bus service MC-719 starts from Anand Vihar metro station and passes through the following bus stops: Yojana Vihar, Yamuna Krida Sthan, Ram Vihar, Anand Vihar, Delhi Heart Hospital, Jagriti Enclave, Saini Enclave, Karkardooma Metro station, Arya Nagar, Village Dayanand Vihar, DSSSB, Hargobind Enclave, Hasanpur Depot, Hasanpur Village and Gazipur, before coming back to the station. It runs in a loop.
  - Feeder bus service ML-53 starts from Dilshad Garden metro station and ends at Mayur Vihar Ph-III. It passes through the following bus stops: Surya Nagar (Indian Oil Petrol Pump), Ram Prastha Xing, Anand Vihar ISBT, Gazi Pur Depot, Gazi Pur Village, Trilok Puri Mod, Dallu Pura Mod, Mayur Vihar Phase-III Xing, Bharti Public School and CRPF camp.
  - Feeder bus service ML-53A starts from Seemapuri and ends at Mayur Vihar Ph-III. It passes through the following bus stops: Seemapuri Terminal, Dilshad Garden MS, Surya Nagar(Indian Oil Petrol Pump), Ram Prastha Xing, Anand Vihar ISBT, Gazi Pur Depot, Gazi Pur Village, Trilok Puri Mod, Dallu Pura Mod, Mayur Vihar Phase-III Xing, Bharti Public School and CRPF camp.
  - Feeder bus service MC-341 starts from Mayur Vihar Ph-III and ends at Harsh Vihar. It passes through the following bus stops: CRPF Camp, Mayur Vihar III A-1, Bharti Public School, New Kondli A-1, Mayur Vihar Phase-3 Mor, Mayur Vihar Phase-3 X-ing, Ganpati Mandir, Fire Station Dallupura, Dallupura, Kondli, Kalyanpuri Mor, Gazipur Dairy, Gazipur X-ing NH-24, Gazipur Village, Tata Telco, Gazipur Depot, Anand Vihar metro station, Anand Vihar ISBT, Ram Prastha X-ing, Ram Prastha Mandir, Surya Nagar, Dilshad Garden metro station, Shahdara Border, Shahdara Border, Dilshad Garden J&K Block, Old Seemapuri, Seemapuri Depot, Dlf X-ing, Radha Krishna Mandir, Anand Gram, Tahirpur, Mata Mandir and Sunder Nagri/ Gagan Cinema.

=== Rail ===
Anand Vihar Terminal railway station, operated by Indian Railways, is situated in close proximity to the station, providing connectivity between the Delhi Metro and the national railway network.

=== RRTS ===
The station is also connected to the Anand Vihar station of the Delhi–Meerut RRTS, which is one of the four underground stations on the corridor.

== Gallery ==
Anand Vihar metro station - Anand Vihar Railway Terminal entrance

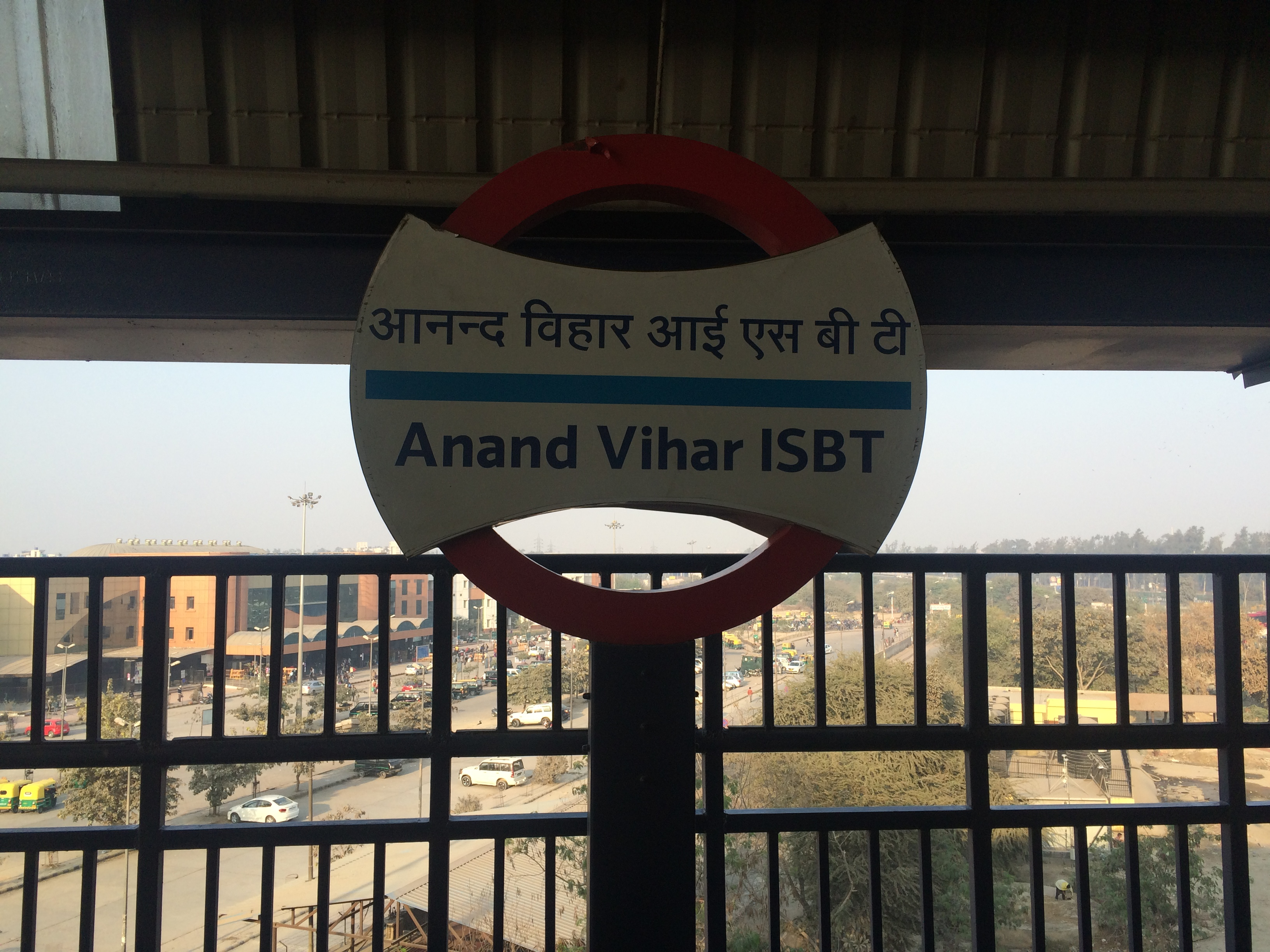
Anand Vihar metro station - platform board

Anand Vihar metro station - board

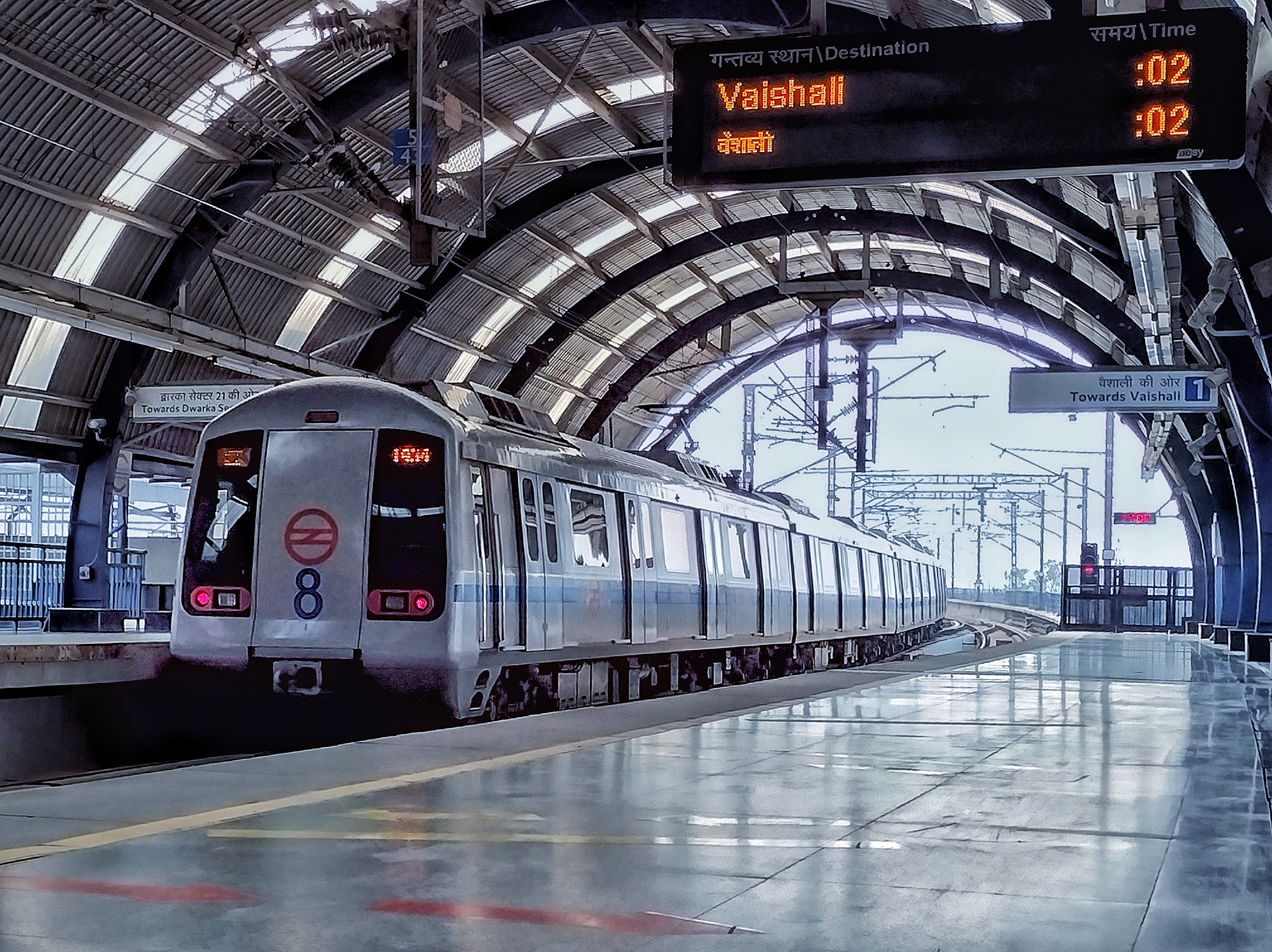
A train leaving the platform

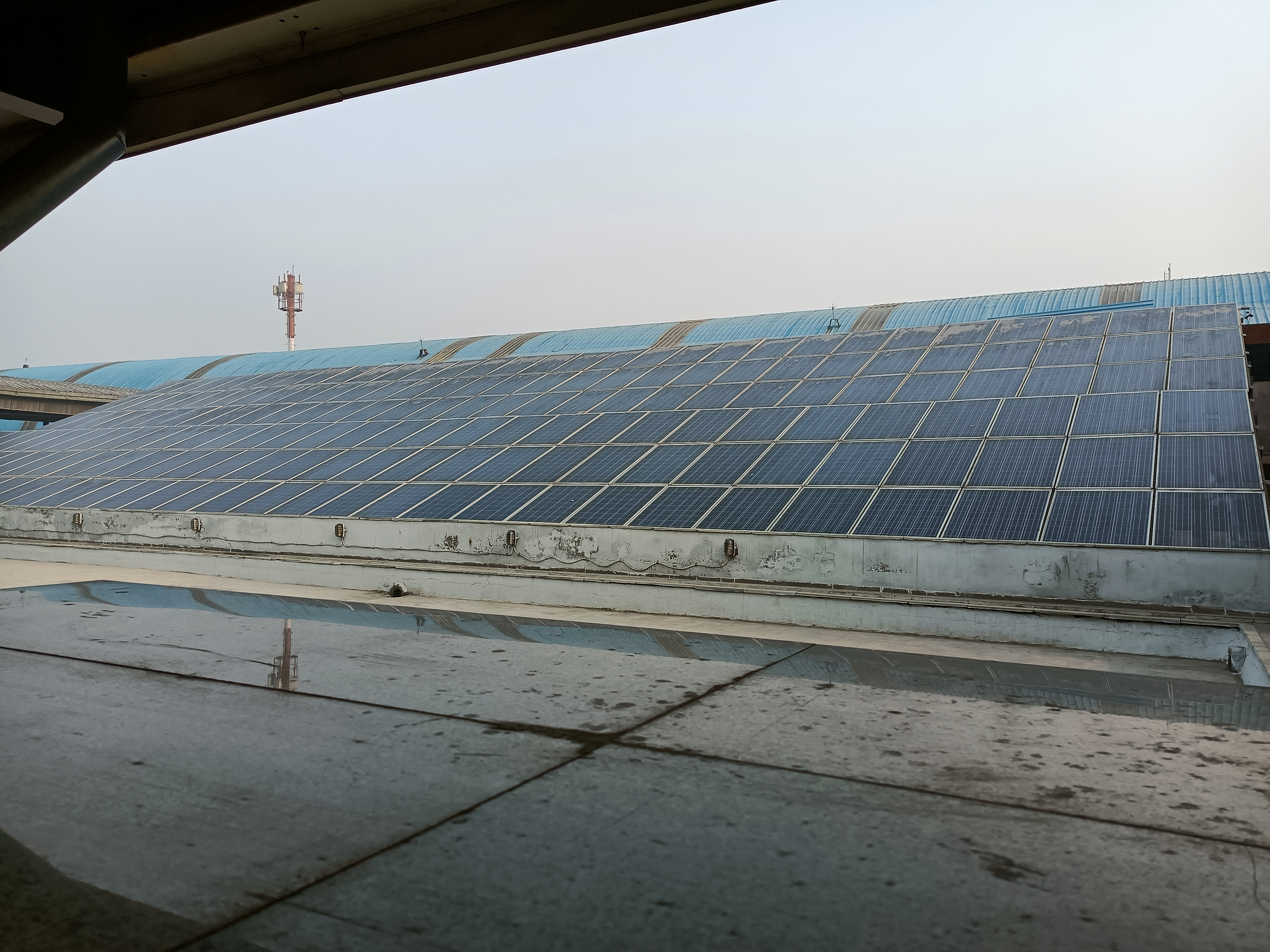
A rooftop solar power system at the station

== See also ==
- Delhi
- List of Delhi Metro stations
- Transport in Delhi
- Delhi Metro Rail Corporation
- Delhi Suburban Railway
- Delhi Monorail
- Anand Vihar Terminal railway station
- Delhi Transport Corporation
- East Delhi
- New Delhi
- National Capital Region (India)
- List of rapid transit systems
- List of metro systems
- Anand Vihar RRTS station
