= Majlis Park metro station =

Metro station in Delhi, India

Majlis Park

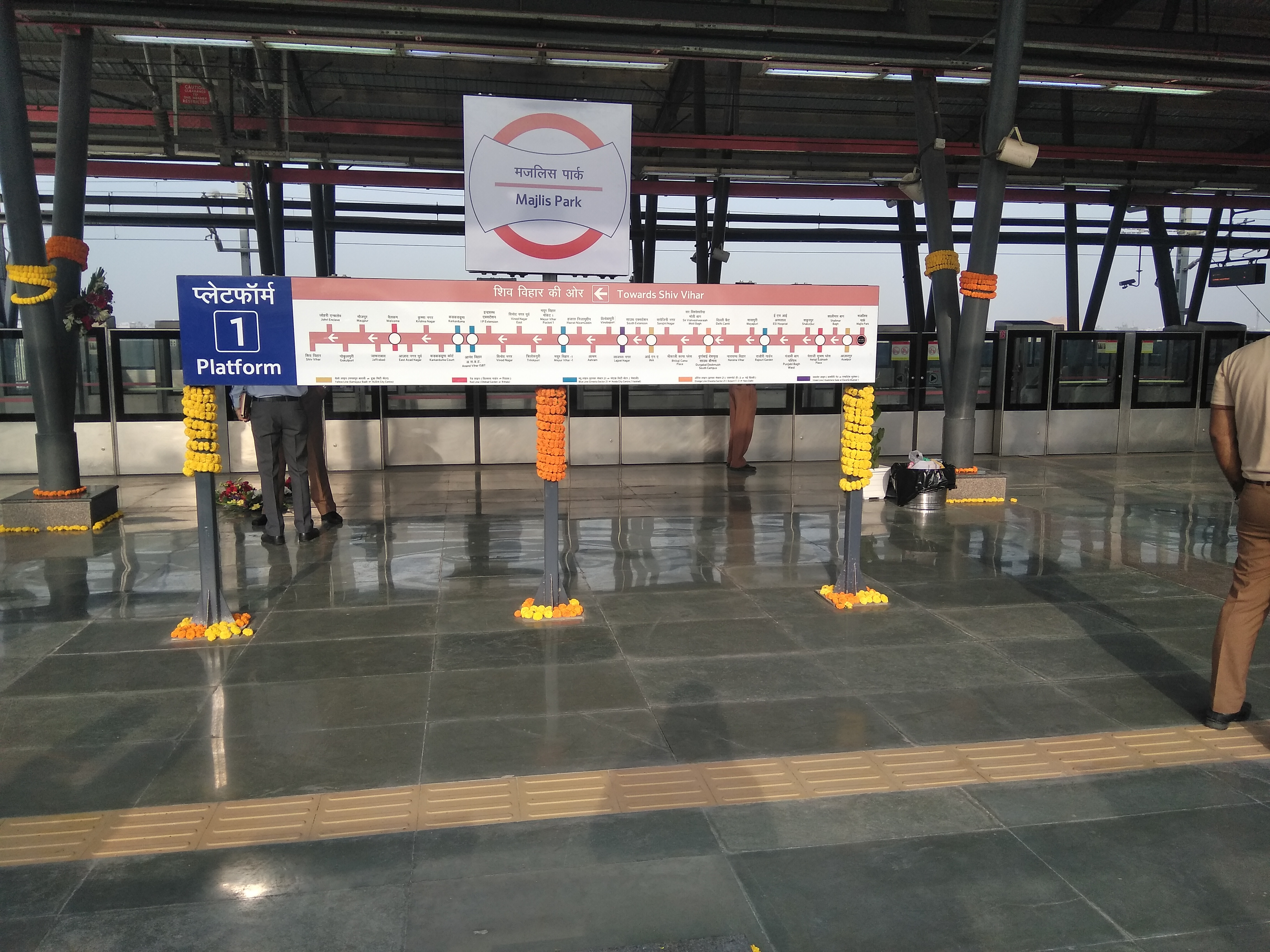

General information
- Location: Arihant Marg, Block EE, Majlis Park, Jahangirpuri, Delhi - 110033
- Coordinates: 28°43′27″N 77°10′55″E
- System: Delhi Metro station
- Owner: Delhi Metro
- Operator: Delhi Metro Rail Corporation (DMRC)
- Line: Pink Line Magenta Line
- Platforms: Island platform Platforms 1, 3 → "-" Circular Line; Platforms 2, 4 → "+" Circular Line; Platform 5 → Deepali Chowk; Platform 6 → Train terminates
- Tracks: 4

Construction
- Structure type: Elevated
- Platform levels: 2
- Accessible: Yes

Other information
- Status: Staffed, Operational
- Station code: MKPR
- Fare zone: Phase III & IV

History
- Opened: 14 March 2018; 8 years ago Pink Line; 8 March 2026; 8 months ago Magenta Line
- Electrified: 25 kV 50 Hz AC through overhead catenary

Services
Preceding station	Delhi Metro	Following station
Burari towards Maujpur - Babarpur	Pink Line	Azadpur towards Maujpur - Babarpur
Terminus	Magenta Line	Bhalaswa towards Deepali Chowk
Future service
Azadpur towards Ramakrishna Ashram Marg	Magenta Line	Bhalaswa towards Botanical Garden
Route map
Location

Majlis Park is an elevated interchange metro station located on the Pink and the Magenta lines of the Delhi Metro. It currently serves as the terminus of the Deepali Chowk - Majlis Park stretch of the Magenta Line, and previously served as the terminus of the Pink Line until 8 March 2026, when the stretch between Majlis Park and Maujpur–Babarpur was inaugurated as part of the Pink Line's circular route under Phase IV of the Delhi Metro.

== History ==
As per the Detailed Project Report (DPR) of Phase III, Majlis Park (then known as Mukundpur) was initially planned as an at-grade station on land belonging to the Delhi Police and the Public Works Department (PWD). However, the Delhi Metro Rail Corporation (DMRC) had to revise the alignment on 21 March 2012 due to the non-availability of Delhi Police land. Consequently, the station was shifted to the other side of PWD Road No. 51 and constructed as an elevated station. The estimated cost for its construction, including the depot entry, was ₹137.86 crore (US$15 million), against the original DPR provision of ₹62.15 crore (US$6.6 million). The station was eventually completed at a cost of ₹134.88 crore (US$14 million), resulting in an additional expenditure of ₹72.73 crore (US$7.8 million) over the original provision.

== Station layout ==
Station layout Pink Line

L2	Platforms 1 & 3 Anticlockwise	"-" Circular Line (Anticlockwise); Via: Azadpur, Shalimar Bagh, Netaji Subhash Place, Punjabi Bagh West, Rajouri Garden, Mayapuri, Naraina Vihar, Delhi Cantt., Durgabai Deshmukh South Campus, Sir M. Vishweshwaraiah Moti Bagh, Sarojini Nagar, Dilli Haat - INA, South Extension, Lajpat Nagar, Sarai Kale Khan - Nizamuddin; Next Station: Azadpur; Change at the next station for Yellow Line
L2	Island platform | Doors will open on the right
L2	Platforms 2 & 4 Clockwise	"+" Circular Line (Clockwise); Via: Burari, Jagatpur - Wazirabad, Nanaksar - Sonia Vihar, Bhajanpura, Yamuna Vihar, Maujpur - Babarpur, Welcome, Karkarduma, Anand Vihar, IP Extension, Trilokpuri - Sanjay Lake, Shree Ram Mandir Mayur Vihar, Mayur Vihar-I; Next Station: Burari
L1	Concourse	Fare control, station agent
G	Street Level	Exit/Entrance

Station layout Magenta Line

P	Platform 5 Southbound	Towards → Deepali Chowk; Next Station: Bhalaswa
P	Island platform | Doors will open on the right
P	Platform 6 Northbound	Towards ← Train terminates here
C	Concourse	Fare control, station agent, metro card vending machines, crossover
G	Street Level	Gates

== Entry/Exit ==
Majlis Park metro station: Gates
Gate No-1	Gate No-2
Entry from Arihant Marg	Exit from Arihant Marg

== See also ==
- Delhi
- List of Delhi Metro stations
- Transport in Delhi
- Delhi Metro Rail Corporation
- Delhi Suburban Railway
- Delhi Monorail
- Delhi Transport Corporation
- North Delhi
- New Delhi
- National Capital Region (India)
- List of rapid transit systems
- List of metro systems
