= Sarai Kale Khan – Nizamuddin metro station =

Metro station in Delhi, India

Sarai Kale Khan – Nizamuddin

General information
- Coordinates: 28°35′22″N 77°15′26″E
- System: Delhi Metro station
- Owner: Delhi Metro
- Operator: Delhi Metro Rail Corporation
- Line: Pink Line
- Platforms: Island platform Platform 1 → "-" Circular Line; Platform 2 → "+" Circular Line
- Tracks: 2
- Connections: Sarai Kale Khan; Hazrat Nizamuddin; Sarai Kale Khan ISBT

Construction
- Structure type: Underground, Double-track
- Platform levels: 2
- Accessible: Yes

Other information
- Status: Staffed, Operational
- Station code: NIZM

History
- Opened: 31 December 2018; 7 years ago
- Electrified: 25 kV 50 Hz AC through overhead catenary

Services
Preceding station	Delhi Metro	Following station
Ashram towards Maujpur - Babarpur	Pink Line	Mayur Vihar-I towards Shiv Vihar
Route map
Location

Sarai Kale Khan–Nizamuddin is an underground metro station on the Pink Line of the Delhi Metro, located in South-East Delhi. It commenced operations on 31 December 2018 as part of Phase III of the network's expansion, initially under the name Hazrat Nizamuddin. It was subsequently renamed Sarai Kale Khan–Nizamuddin in 2019.

The station forms part of the Sarai Kale Khan multimodal transport hub, which brings together the Delhi Metro, the Delhi–Meerut Namo Bharat Regional Rapid Transit System (RRTS), Hazrat Nizamuddin railway station and the Veer Haqeeqat Rai Inter-State Bus Terminal (ISBT). The Sarai Kale Khan RRTS station commenced operations on 22 February 2026. A 280 metres (920 ft) long foot overbridge equipped with six travelators connects the RRTS station with Hazrat Nizamuddin railway station. A dedicated pedestrian connection between the RRTS footbridge and the underground metro station is also being developed.

== Station layout ==
G	Street level	Exit/Entrance
C	Concourse	Fare control, station agent, Ticket/token, shops
P	Platform 1 Anticlockwise	"-" Circular Line (Anticlockwise); Via: Mayur Vihar-I, Shree Ram Mandir Mayur Vihar, Trilokpuri - Sanjay Lake, IP Extension, Anand Vihar, Karkarduma, Welcome, Maujpur - Babarpur, Yamuna Vihar, Bhajanpura, Nanaksar - Sonia Vihar, Jagatpur - Wazirabad, Burari, Majlis Park, Azadpur, Shalimar Bagh, Netaji Subhash Place, Punjabi Bagh West; Next Station: Mayur Vihar-I; Change at the next station for Blue Line
P	Island platform | Doors will open on the left
P	Platform 2 Clockwise	"+" Circular Line (Clockwise); Via: Ashram, Vinobapuri, Lajpat Nagar, South Extension, Dilli Haat - INA, Sarojini Nagar, Bhikaji Cama Place, Sir M. Vishweshwaraiah Moti Bagh, Durgabai Deshmukh South Campus, Delhi Cantt., Naraina Vihar, Mayapuri, Rajouri Garden; Next Station: Ashram

== See also ==
- Delhi
- List of Delhi Metro stations
- Transport in Delhi
- Delhi Metro Rail Corporation
- Delhi Suburban Railway
- Inner Ring Road, Delhi
- Delhi Monorail
- Delhi Transport Corporation
- South Delhi
- Sarai Kale Khan
- New Delhi
- National Capital Region (India)
- List of rapid transit systems
- List of metro systems
