= Mayur Vihar-I metro station =

Metro station in Delhi, India

Mayur Vihar - 1

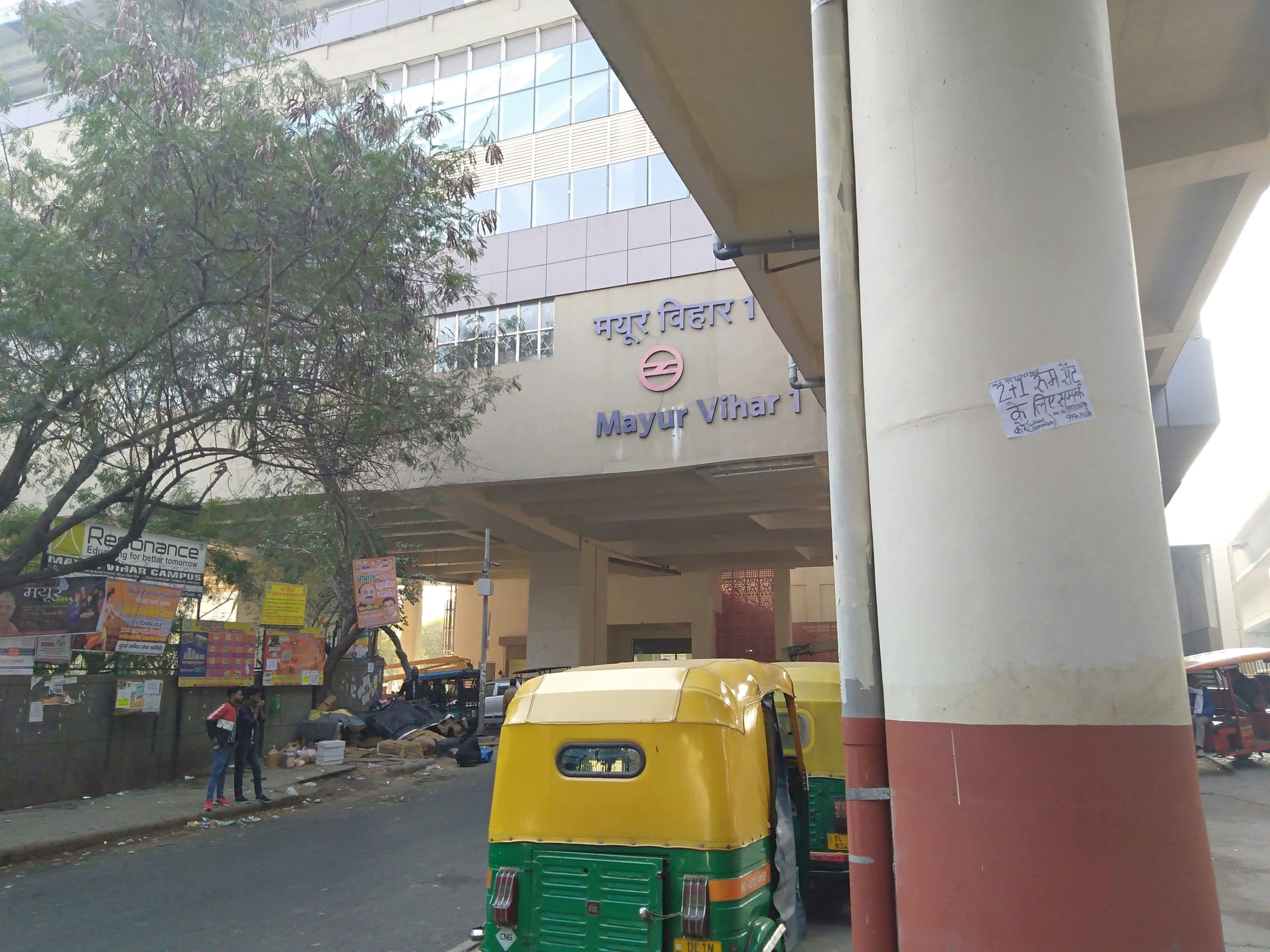

General information
- Location: Mayur Vihar Phase 1, East Delhi
- Coordinates: 28°36′15″N 77°17′22″E
- System: Delhi Metro station
- Owner: Delhi Metro Rail Corporation
- Line: Blue Line Pink Line
- Platforms: Island platform Blue Line; Platform 1 → Noida Electronic City; Platform 2 → Dwarka Sector 21; Side Platform Pink Line; Platform 3 → "-" Circular Line; Platform 4 → "+" Circular Line
- Tracks: 4

Construction
- Structure type: Elevated
- Platform levels: 2
- Parking: Available
- Accessible: Yes

Other information
- Station code: MVP1

History
- Opened: 12 November 2009; 17 years ago Blue Line; 31 December 2018; 7 years ago Pink Line
- Electrified: 25 kV 50 Hz AC through overhead catenary

Passengers
- October 2019: 36,245
- October 2023: 95,492 ▲163.46%

Services
| Preceding station | Delhi Metro | Following station |
|---|---|---|
| Akshardham towards Dwarka Sector 21 | Blue Line | Mayur Vihar Extension towards Noida Electronic City |
| Sarai Kale Khan - Nizamuddin towards Maujpur - Babarpur | Pink Line | Shree Ram Mandir Mayur Vihar towards Shiv Vihar |
Route map
Location

Mayur Vihar-I metro station is an interchange station between the Blue Line and Pink Line of the Delhi Metro. Located in East Delhi, it serves the Mayur Vihar Phase-I residential area and provides access to nearby residential pockets, including Pocket-I and Pocket-IV.

The Pink Line section of Mayur Vihar-I station has platforms at a height of 22 metres (72 ft) above ground level. It was the tallest station in the Delhi Metro network at the time. In October 2023, it recorded a daily footfall of 95,492 passengers, a 163.5% increase compared to October 2019, making it the fastest-growing interchange station in the network by ridership growth.

The Pink Line station is approximately 140 m (460 ft) long and was constructed along Khudi Ram Bose Marg, which is 13 m (43 ft) wide. Due to the limited space, a unique chandelier-style design was adopted, featuring a single pier that branches into two columns. This was the first time such a design was used on the Delhi Metro network. The Pink Line and Blue Line stations are connected by an 83 m (272 ft) long footbridge. The Pink Line viaduct passes above the Blue Line tracks and two road flyovers at a height of 23 m (75 ft), making it the second-highest alignment on the Delhi Metro network at the time of its construction.

== Station layout ==
Station layout Blue Line

| P | Platform 1 Eastbound | Towards → Noida Electronic City or Vaishali; Next Station: Mayur Vihar Extension |
| P | Island platform | Doors will open on the right |
| P | Platform 2 Westbound | Towards ← Dwarka Sector 21; Next Station: Akshardham |
| C | Concourse | Fare control, station agent, metro card vending machines, crossover |
| G | Street Level | Gates |

Station layout Pink Line

| P | Side platform | Doors will open on the left |
| P | Platform 3 Anticlockwise | "-" Circular Line (Anticlockwise); Via: Shree Ram Mandir Mayur Vihar, Trilokpuri - Sanjay Lake, East Vinod Nagar - Mayur Vihar-II, Mandawali - West Vinod Nagar, IP Extension, Anand Vihar, Karkarduma, Krishna Nagar, Welcome, Maujpur - Babarpur, Yamuna Vihar, Bhajanpura, Nanaksar - Sonia Vihar, Jagatpur - Wazirabad, Burari, Majlis Park, Azadpur, Shalimar Bagh, Netaji Subhash Place, Punjabi Bagh West; Next Station: Shree Ram Mandir Mayur Vihar |
| P | Platform 4 Clockwise | "+" Circular Line (Clockwise); Via: Sarai Kale Khan - Nizamuddin, Ashram, Vinobapuri, Lajpat Nagar, South Extension, Dilli Haat - INA, Sarojini Nagar, Sir M. Vishweshwaraiah Moti Bagh, Durgabai Deshmukh South Campus, Delhi Cantt., Naraina Vihar, Mayapuri, Rajouri Garden; Next Station: Sarai Kale Khan - Nizamuddin |
| P | Side platform | Doors will open on the left |
| C | Concourse | Fare control, station agent, metro card vending machines, crossover |
| G | Street Level | Gates |

== Facilities ==
There are ATMs from Punjab National Bank and HDFC.

== Entry/Exits ==
Mayur Vihar Phase-1 metro station: Entry/Exits
| Gate No-1 | Gate No-2 | Gate No-3 | Gate No-4 |
|---|---|---|---|
| IFS Apartments | Noida Link Road | Mayur Vihar Phase 1 | RTO Office, Mayur Vihar (DL-07) |

== Connections ==
=== Bus ===
- DTC buses: DTC bus routes 347, 347A, 355, 443, 492, and 611A serve the station from the nearby Mayur Vihar Phase 1 X-ing bus stop.

== Gallery ==
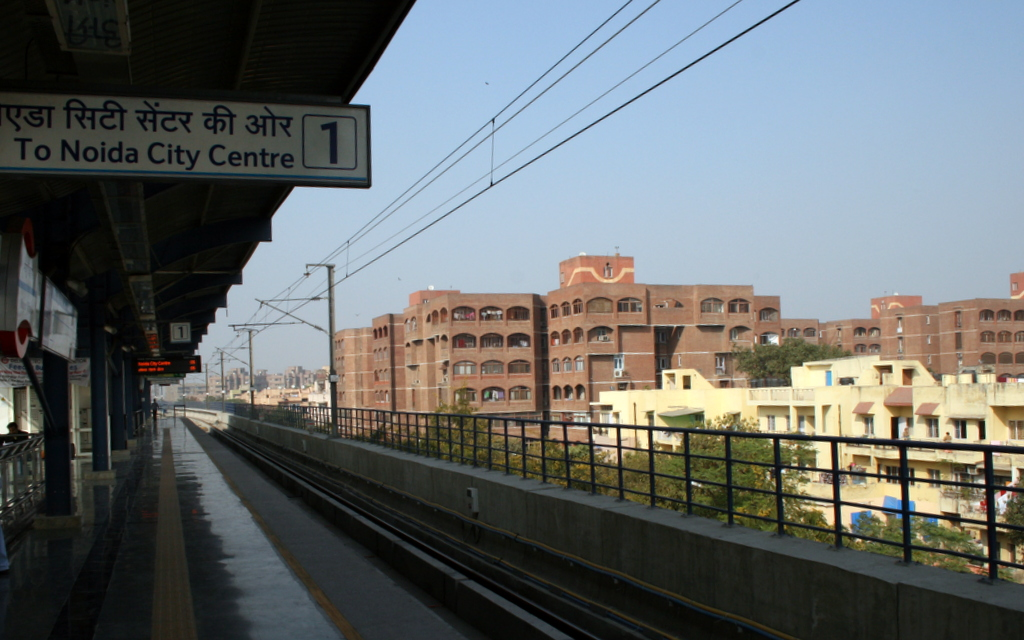
View of Mayur Vihar from the metro station

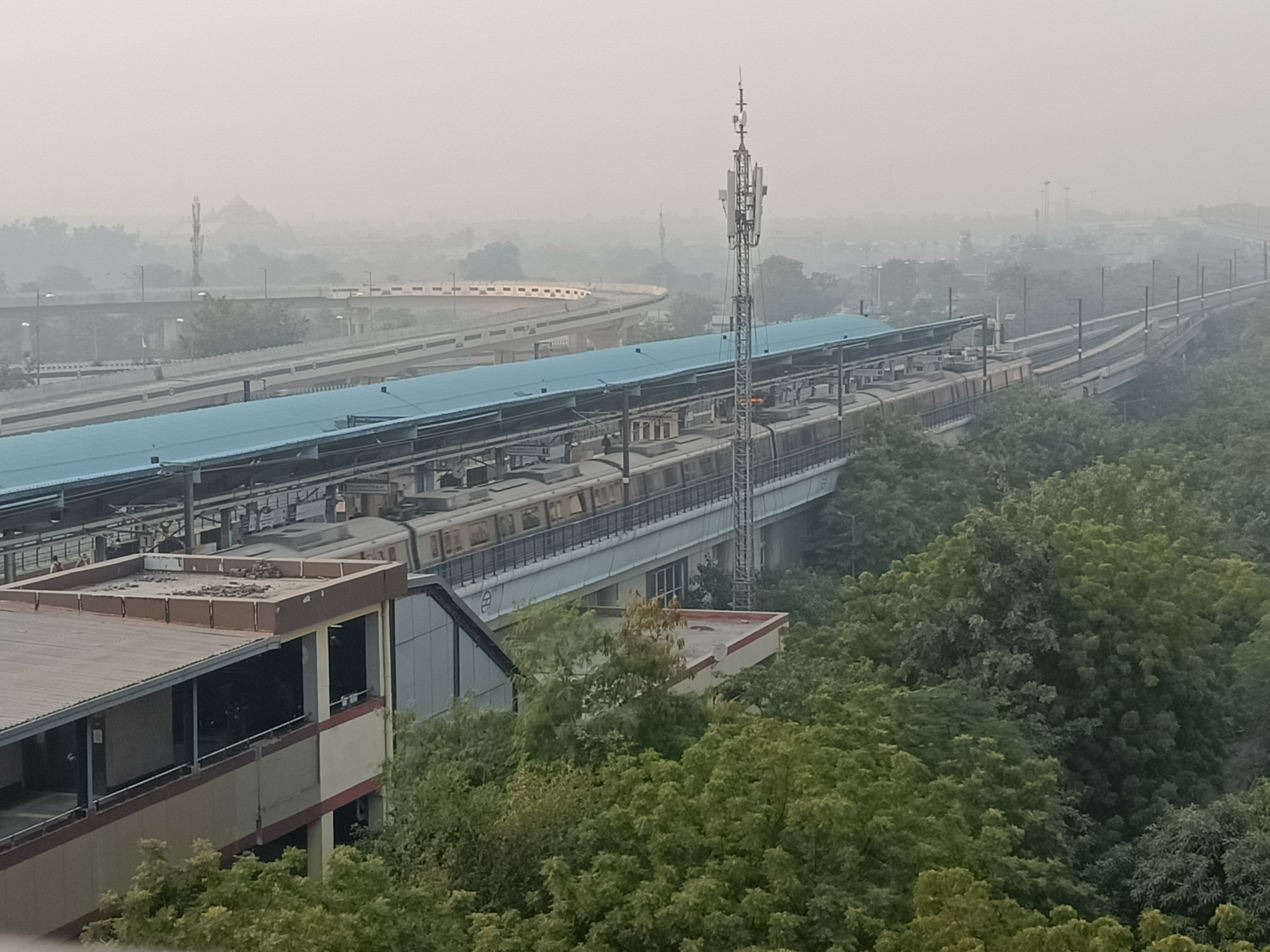
The Blue Line station of Delhi Metro's Mayur Vihar Phase 1 station

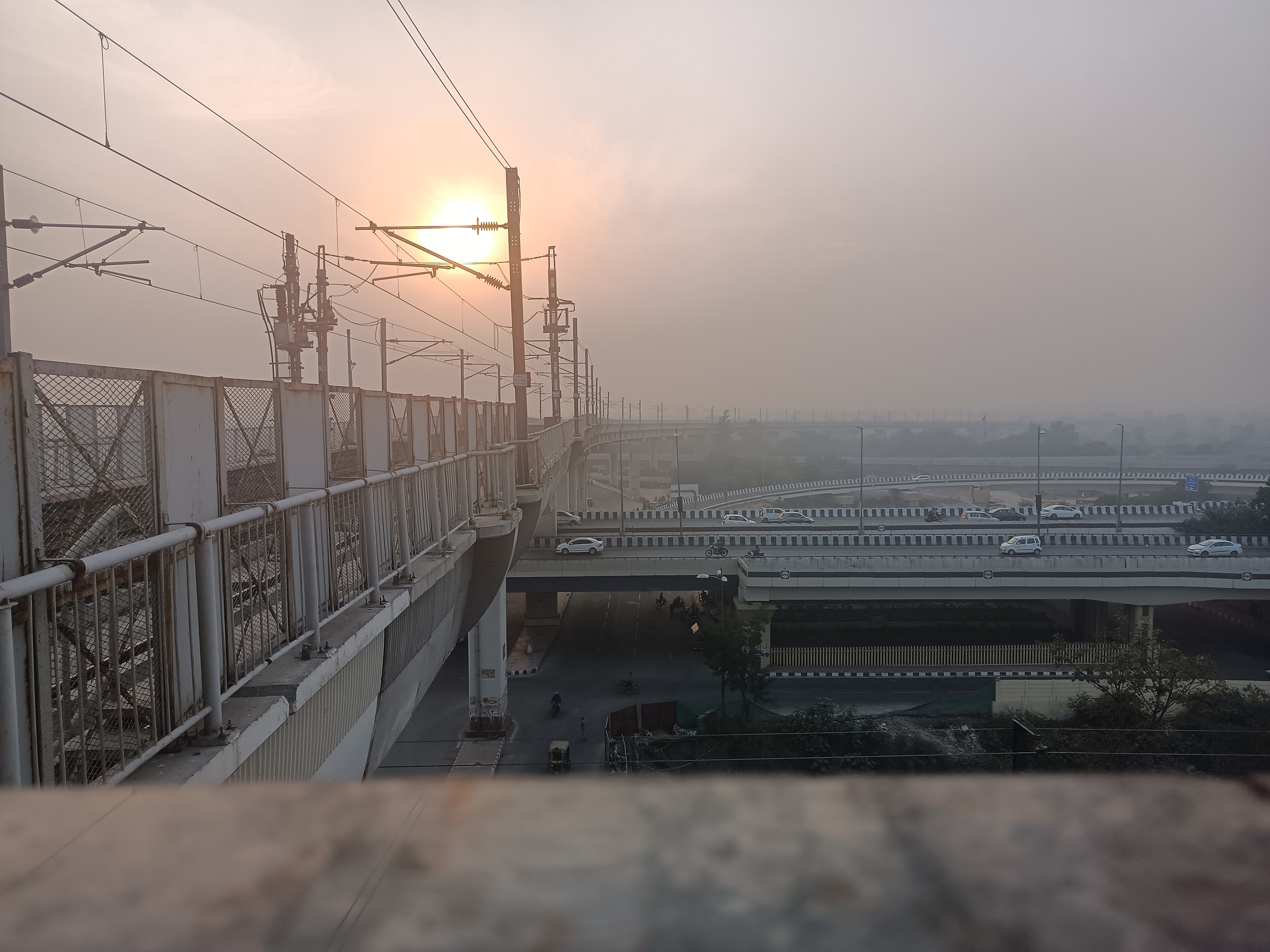
Viaduct - Pink Line of the Mayur Vihar metro station of Delhi Metro

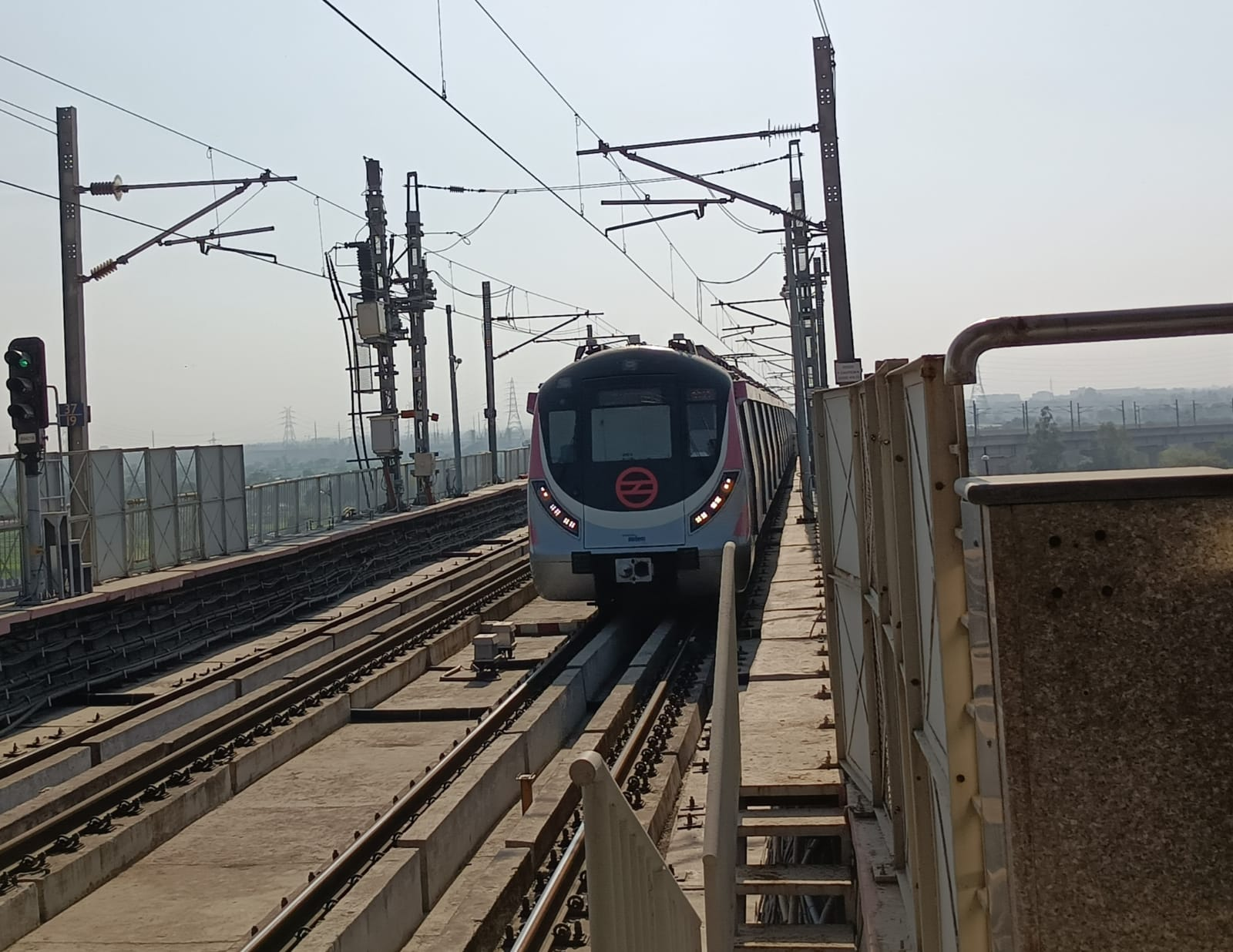
A Hyundai-Rotem train of the Pink Line at the Mayur Vihar-I metro station

== See also ==
- List of Delhi Metro stations
- Transport in Delhi
- Delhi Metro Rail Corporation
- Delhi Suburban Railway
