= Lists of urban rail transit systems =

These lists of urban rail transit systems are sorted by the type of system:

- List of tram and light rail transit systems
- List of town tramway systems
- Tram-train#List of tram-train systems
- Light metro#List of light metro systems
- List of premetro systems
- List of metro systems
- List of monorail systems
- List of suburban and commuter rail systems
- List of funicular railways
- List of urban rail systems in Japan

== See also ==
- List of bus rapid transit systems
- List of trolleybus systems
- List of airport people mover systems
