= Laxmi Nagar (Delhi) =

- Neighbourhood of Delhi
- Location in Delhi, India
- Coordinates: 28°37′57″N 77°16′38″E
- Country: India
- State: Delhi
- District: East Delhi

Government
  - Type: Democratic
  - Body: Municipal Corporation of Delhi

Languages
  - Official: Hindi, English
- Time zone: UTC+5:30 (IST)
- PIN: 110092
- Nearest city: Ghaziabad
- Lok Sabha constituency: East Delhi
- Vidhan Sabha constituency: Laxmi Nagar
- Civic agency: MCD

Laxmi Nagar, is the central location and focal point for east Delhi area. Earlier, it was one of the most inhabited cities, known as Trans Yammuna (Laksmi Nagar). It has become a popular shopping area for garments, and day to day staple items.

Akshardham temple is around 3 km from Laxmi Nagar.

Laxmi Nagar is popularly known for being the central location for the majority of Coaching centers associated with the Chartered Accountancy Course offered by Institute of Chartered Accountants of India, Cost and Management Accountancy offered by Institute of Cost Accountants of India . and also for the Company Secretary course offered by Institute of Company Secretaries of India.

Abhay Verma from BJP is the current MLA (Member Of Legislative Assembly) from Laxmi Nagar.

== Major Schools ==
- Government Sarvodaya Bal / Kanya Vidyalaya, Laxmi Nagar
- Bharti Public School, Swasthya Vihar
- Vidya Bal Bhawan Public School
- Sneh International School
- Jagdish Bal Mandir Public School
- Lovely Public School
- Bal Bhavan Public School
- SLS DAV Public School
- Amar Jeevan Public School
- First Step Learning School
- AVB Public school
- Vardhman Shiksha Niketan
- Andhra Education Society School
- Ryan International School
- GGSSS
- RSKV ( Rashtriya Sarvodya Kanya Vidyalaya)

== Malls ==
- V3S Mall
- Cinepolis (Fun Cinemas is replaced by Cinepolis)
- Shagun Sweets (Chappan Bhog Prasad And Thal) Best Sweets Shop
- Radhu Palace (only for wine and chicken shop)

== Parks ==
- Vishwakarma Park
- Lalita Park
- Tikona Park
- Ramesh Park
- Jagat Ram Park
- Sanjay Park
- Gyan Kunj Park
- DDA sports Ground Bank Enclave

== Nearby Metro Station ==
- Akshardhaam Metro
- Laxmi Nagar Metro Station
- Nirman Vihar Metro Station
- Yamuna Bank Metro Station
- Preet Vihar Metro Station
- Indraprasth Metro Station

== Nearby Colonies ==
- Preet Vihar
- Nirman Vihar
- Pandav Nagar
- Patparganj
- Mayur Vihar
- Shakarpur
- Khureji khas
- Mandawali
- Ganesh nagar
- Geeta colony
- Gandhi Nagar
- Kundan Nagar
- Bank Enclave
- Sukh Vihar
