= New Kondli =

New Kondli is a resettlement colony that came into existence after 1990. It lies in the Kondli constituency in East Delhi and is adjacent to Mayur Vihar Phase - 3, Noida sector-11 and Vasundhra Enclave. The area comes under 07- Kondli ward of East Delhi Municipal Corporation. Major development to this area began after 2001. It is divided into four blocks - A, B, C, and D. It acts as a frequently used entrance to Mayur Vihar Phase-3. This entrance is situated along Pragati Marg. The area also houses Kondli STP of Capacity 90 MGD(2nd largest in Delhi) which is spread between Kondli Village and the New Kondli Area.

== Demographics ==
Most people living in this area are from Uttrakhand, Uttar Pradesh, Bihar and Rajasthan. The people speak a variety of languages, unlike mostly monolingual Delhi.

== Blocks ==
Block A mainly comprises wholesale markets that supply rations to Noida ration shopkeepers. Shopkeepers formed a general regulatory association called the New Kondli Shopkeepers Association. This area generally comes under the District of Preet Vihar.

Block B, C and D generally comprise residential areas. A commercial belt and shops lie along the Pragati Marg. They are in general wholesale shops for rations, stationary, power inverters and batteries.

A Janta Housing Scheme was constructed besides the Block - B.

== Infrastructure ==
A subsidiary pumping station is there. Chief Minister Sheila Dikshit inaugurated a 51st electric station of BSES in Block A in 2012. Two large public parks are named Smriti Vana and Kondli-Gharoli.

A Petrol pump named Ruchika petrol pump is there at border with Noida.

The area houses Kondli STP (owned by Delhi Jal board) of 90 MGD capacity which treats the wastewater of the neighbouring area and by installed capacity it is the second largest sewage treatment plant in Delhi after Okhla STP.

Red Fox Hotel is also situated near to Bharti public school.

== Schools ==
- Bharti Public School
- Vanasthali Public School
- Govt. boys/girls Senior secondary school
- Bharat bharti public school
