= East Vinod Nagar =

- District Subdivision
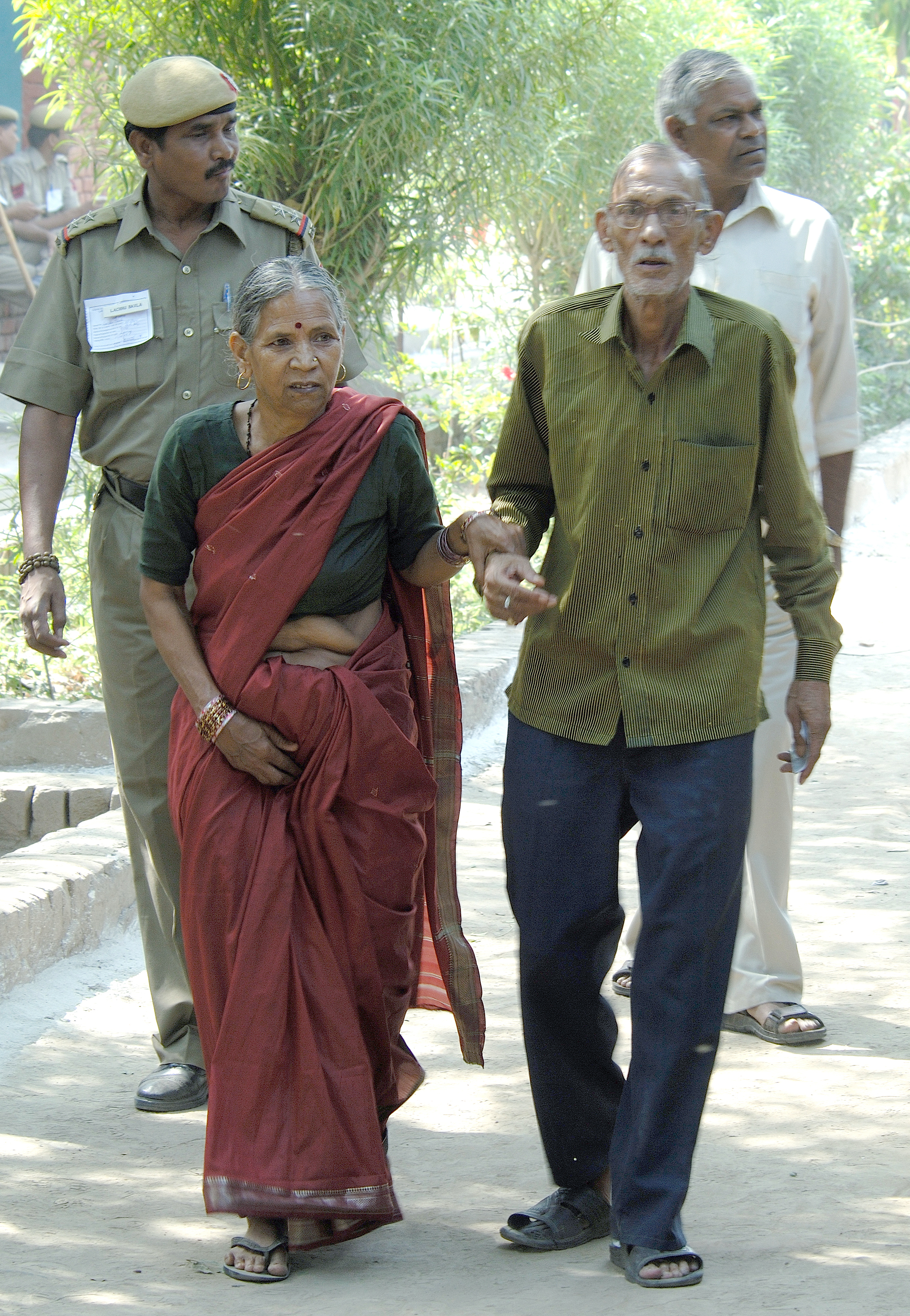
- An elderly couple going to cast their vote at a polling booth in East Vinod Nagar

- Location in Delhi, India
- Coordinates: 28.667508°N 77.121255°E
- Country: India
- State: Delhi
- District: East Delhi

Government
  - Body: Municipal Corporation Of Delhi

Languages
  - Official: Hindi, English
- Time zone: UTC+5:30 (IST)
- PIN: 110091
- Nearest city: Noida
- Lok Sabha constituency: East Delhi
- Vidhan Sabha constituency: Patparganj
- Civic agency: Municipal Corporation Of Delhi

East Vinod Nagar (Hindi: पूर्वी विनोद नगर) is a residential colony situated adjacent to Mayur Vihar Phase-II, Sanjay Lake Park and Kalyan Vas Janta Flats in East Delhi, India.

It is one of the 2 parts of Vinod Nagar, the other being West Vinod Nagar. Both these parts are separated by the Delhi-Meerut Expressway, and both of them have stations of Delhi Metro's Pink Line - East Vinod Nagar - Mayur Vihar-II metro station and Mandawali - West Vinod Nagar metro station.

== Notable people ==
- Yogesh Bhati won the bronze medal at 100 kg (220 lb) weight in Asian Cadet Wrestling Championship at Bangkok, Thailand in 2010.
