= Gandhi Nagar, Delhi =

Gandhi Nagar
- Neighbourhood of Delhi
- Location in Delhi, India
- Coordinates: 28.660504°N 77.256328°E
- Country: India
- State: Delhi
- District: East Delhi

Languages
  - Official: Hindi, English
- Time zone: UTC+5:30 (IST)
- PIN: 110 031
- Nearest city: Ghaziabad
- Lok Sabha constituency: East Delhi
- Vidhan Sabha constituency: Gandhi Nagar Arvinder Singh Lovely
- Civic agency: MCD

Map showing the nine districts of Delhi

Gandhi Nagar is a residential area in the East Delhi district of Delhi in the Trans-Yamuna area. It is most known for Gandhi Nagar Market, which is Asia's biggest readymade garments/textile market. Gandhi Nagar is home to a vast number of shops and factories. It was built on the acquired village lands of Seelampur.

Administratively it is one of the three subdivision of the East Delhi district (the others being Preet Vihar and Vivek Vihar) and one of the ten state legislative assembly constituencies under the East Delhi (Lok Sabha constituency), presently represented by Harsh Malhotra. The area is one of the most congested colonies with a population of around 3.5 lakh. It a high population of Muslims, many of whom are workers in the factory in the East Delhi constituency at 22%.

It was a notorious market between 2016 and 2017 by the USTR for selling counterfeit apparel.

== Residential colonies ==
It is surrounded by other colonies including Geeta Colony, Seelampur and Krishna Nagar. The colonies under this Assembly Constituency are:

- Raghubar Pura Part I and Part II ( Sri Bhawani Devi Mahakali Mandir)

Mahila Colony

- Chand Mohalla
- Shanti Mohalla
- Rajgarh Colony
- Subhash Road
- Ram Nagar
- Amar Mohalla
- Kailash Nagar
- Nanak Basti
- Old Seelampur village
- Ghas Mandi
- Subhash Mohalla
- Ajit Nagar
- Dharampura
- Jain Mohalla
- Shankar Nagar
- Jheel
- Budh Bazar

== Education ==
- Rajkiya Pratibha Vikash Vidyalaya
- Tagore Public School, Subhash Mohalla
- Geeta Bal Bharti, Rajgarh
- R.A. Geeta. Sr. Sec. School, Shankar Nagar
- Gandhi Nagar Girls School
- S.B.V. School, Rajgarh Colony
- Chaudhary Malook Singh School, Jheel
- D.A.V. Govt School
- Sai Memorial Girls Senior Secondary School
- St. Lawrence Public School

== Transportation ==
To make road travel from Mayur Vihar Phase I to Gandhi Nagar traffic-signal-free, four major road infrastructure projects worth Rs.412 crore, including the Geeta Colony bridge were inaugurated in 2009 by Delhi Chief Minister Sheila Dikshit.

Metro stations	Distance
Nirman Vihar	4.7 km
Seelampur	2.7 km
Welcome	3.8 km
Preet Vihar	5.4 km
Akshardham	6.3 km
Shastri Park	1.6 km Source Code : 23623
