= Mandawali - West Vinod Nagar metro station =

Metro station in Delhi, India

Mandawali – West Vinod Nagar

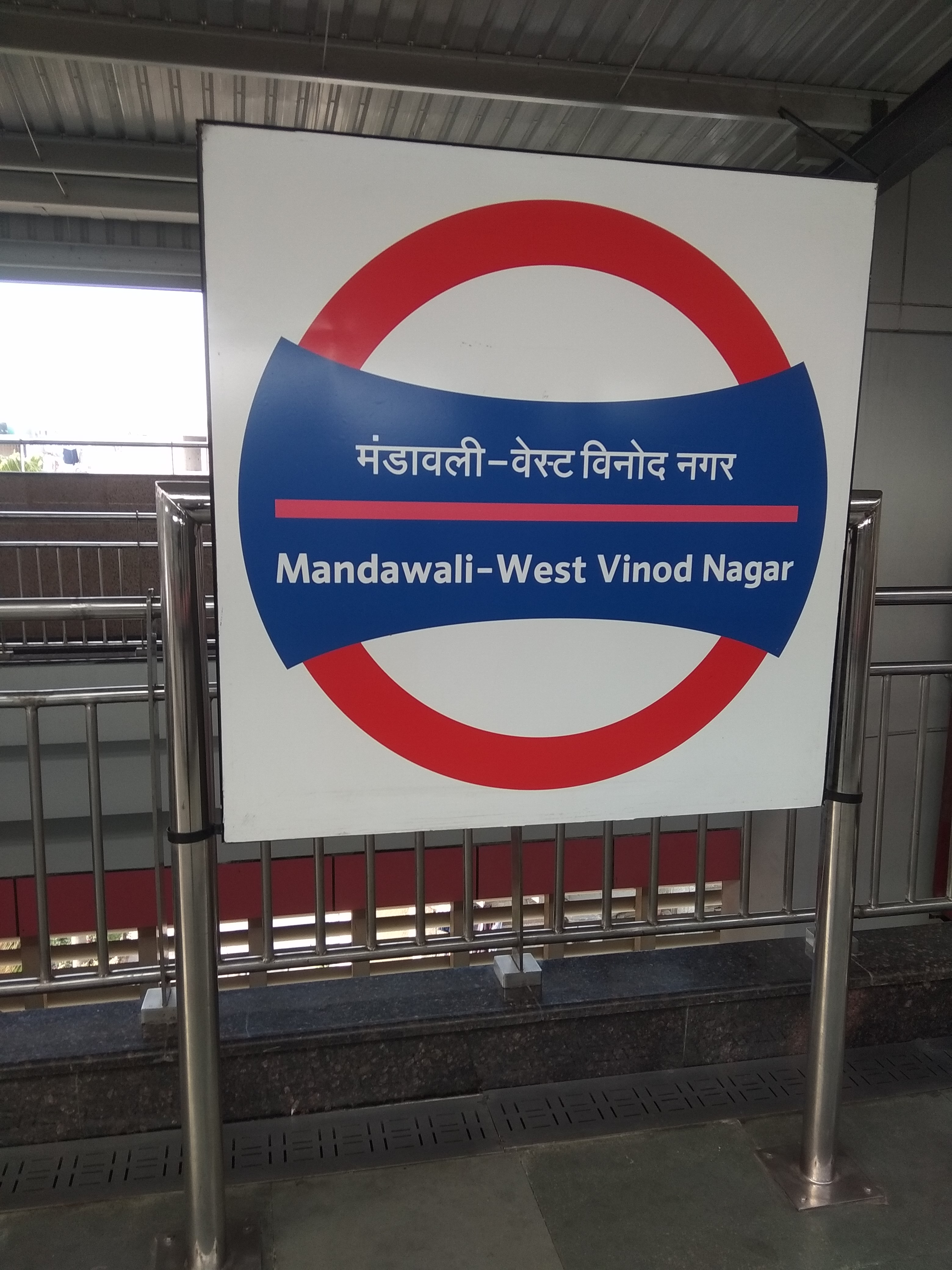

General information
- Location: Narwana Road, Mandawali, West Vinod Nagar, New Delhi, Delhi, 110092
- Coordinates: 28°37′30″N 77°18′16″E
- System: Delhi Metro station
- Owner: Delhi Metro
- Operator: Delhi Metro Rail Corporation (DMRC)
- Line: Pink Line
- Platforms: Side Platform; Platform 1 → "-" Circular Line; Platform 2 → "+" Circular Line
- Tracks: 2

Construction
- Structure type: Elevated, Double-track
- Platform levels: 2
- Accessible: Yes

Other information
- Status: Staffed, Operational
- Station code: VNNR

History
- Opened: 31 October 2018; 7 years ago
- Electrified: 25 kV 50 Hz AC through overhead catenary

Services
Preceding station	Delhi Metro	Following station
East Vinod Nagar - Mayur Vihar-II towards Maujpur - Babarpur	Pink Line	IP Extension towards Shiv Vihar
Route map
Location

Mandawali - West Vinod Nagar is a metro station located on the Pink Line of the Delhi Metro. It was a part of Phase III of the Delhi Metro Network's expansion. The station was opened on 31 October 2018.

== Station layout ==
L2	Side platform | Doors will open on the left
L2	Platform 1 Anticlockwise	"-" Circular Line (Anticlockwise); Via: IP Extension, Anand Vihar, Karkarduma, Krishna Nagar, Welcome, Maujpur - Babarpur, Yamuna Vihar, Bhajanpura, Nanaksar - Sonia Vihar, Jagatpur - Wazirabad, Burari, Majlis Park, Azadpur, Shalimar Bagh, Netaji Subhash Place, Punjabi Bagh West, Rajouri Garden; Next Station: IP Extension
L2	Platform 2 Clockwise	"+" Circular Line (Clockwise); Via: East Vinod Nagar - Mayur Vihar-II, Trilokpuri - Sanjay Lake, Shree Ram Mandir Mayur Vihar, Mayur Vihar-I, Sarai Kale Khan - Nizamuddin, Lajpat Nagar, South Extension, Dilli Haat - INA, Sarojini Nagar, Sir M. Vishweshwaraiah Moti Bagh, Durgabai Deshmukh South Campus, Delhi Cantt., Naraina Vihar, Mayapuri; Next Station: East Vinod Nagar - Mayur Vihar-II
L2	Side platform | Doors will open on the left
L1	Concourse	Fare control, station agent, Metro Card vending machines, crossover
G	Street level	Exit/Entrance

== Exits ==
Mandawali – West Vinod Nagar metro station Entry/exits
Gate No-1	Gate No-2

== Connections ==
=== Bus ===
Delhi Transport Corporation bus routes number 85, 85EXT, 349A, 391, 534, 534A, 534C, 624A, 624ACL, 624BLnkSTL, 740, 740A, 740B, 740EXT, AC-534 serves the station from nearby Ras Vihar bus stop.

== See also ==
- Delhi
- List of Delhi Metro stations
- Transport in Delhi
- Delhi Metro Rail Corporation
- Delhi Suburban Railway
- Delhi Monorail
- Sanjay Lake
- Mayur Vihar
- Delhi Transport Corporation
- East Delhi
- New Delhi
- National Capital Region (India)
- List of rapid transit systems
- List of metro systems
