= Ghazipur, Delhi =

Ghazipur
- Village
- Location in India
- Coordinates: 28.6317311°N 77.318622°E
- Country: India
- State: Delhi
- District: East Delhi

Population (2011)
  - Total: 75,544

Languages
  - Official: Hindi, English
- Time zone: UTC+5:30 (IST)
- PIN: 110096

Ghazipur is a village in East Delhi district of Delhi, India. situated near Delhi-Uttar Pradesh border near Ghaziabad. The border in Ghazipur village is one of the main borders of Delhi and is known as Ghazipur border. It is one of the biggest villages in Delhi. At the time many castes are living in this village with harmony. It is located 8 km towards north from district headquarters Preet Vihar.

The toll plaza of Delhi–Meerut Expressway is known as Ghazipur Border Which connects Delhi to Noida. Ghazipur is a new commercial hub and many new markets for flowers, fruits, clothes have come up. The Ghazipur landfill is one of the largest refuse dumping sites for Delhi. The landfill has grown over the past years that it is now visible from 5 km away.

== Nearby places ==
Hasanpur Village (800 m), Kalyanpuri (2 km), Anand Vihar (2 km), Nirman Vihar (3 km), Surajmal Vihar (4 km), Patparganj (4 km) are the nearby Villages to Ghazipur. Ghazipur is surrounded by Delhi Tehsil towards west, East Delhi Tehsil towards South, Central Delhi Tehsil towards west, North Delhi Tehsil towards North. NOIDA, Delhi, Ghaziabad, Loni are the nearby Cities to Ghazipur. This Place is in the border of the East Delhi District and Gautam Buddha Nagar District. Gautam Buddha Nagar District Bisrakh is East towards this place. It is near to the Uttar Pradesh State Border. Demographics of Ghazipur Hindi is the Local Language here.

== Transportation ==
By road it is connected to Delhi Meerut Expressway. Anand Vihar ISBT is the nearest bus terminus which is 2 km away from Ghazipur. Anand Vihar Railway Station is the nearby railway station to Ghazipur. However Hazrat Nizamuddin Railway Station is the major railway station 9 km from Ghazipur. IP extension is the nearest metro station.

== See also ==
- Ghazipur landfill
