= ASDM =

ASDM or Asdm may refer to:

- Arizona-Sonora Desert Museum
- Akshardham metro station
- Amsterdam Muiderpoort railway station
