= Salwan Public School =

Location
- Pt. Girdhari Lal Salwan Marg; Rajendra Nagar; New Delhi, 110060; India

Information
- School type: Secular, co-educational Primary, Middle and Senior Secondary School
- Motto: Service Before Self
- Founded: 1953
- Founder: Pandit Girdhari Lal Salwan
- Principal: Mrs. Priyanka Barara
- Director and manager: Maj. Gen. Sanjeev Shukla, VSM (Retd.)
- Teaching staff: 137
- Grades: Preschool to 12th grade
- Enrollment: 3,282
- Classrooms: 108
- Campuses: Rajendra Nagar, Mayur Vihar-3, Naraina Vihar, Sector 15-Gurugram, Trans Delhi Signature City.
- Campus size: 10 acres
- Campus type: Urban
- Accreditation: Central Board of Secondary Education
- Affiliation: Salwan Education Trust
- Website: salwanpublicschool.edu.in

Salwan Public School is a public school in New Delhi, India. This school has 10 branches: Salwan Boys Sr. Sec. School, Rajendra Nagar (1949), Salwan Girls Sr. Sec. School, Rajendra Nagar (1950), Salwan Public School, Rajendra Nagar (1953), Salwan Junior School, Naraina (1993), Salwan Public School, Mayur Vihar, Phase III (1996), Salwan Public School, Sector 15(II), Gurugram (1996), Salwan Montessori School, Sector 5, Gurugram (1999) and Salwan Public School, Trans-Delhi Signature City, Ghaziabad (2005). The Old Rajendra Nagar branch was the first branch that was launched, and is an important landmark in the Rajendra Nagar and Karol Bagh localities. The Mayur Vihar branch was listed as second among the top ten schools in East Delhi, in 2012.

The school is registered under Delhi administration. To increase awareness about Delhi Metro, Delhi Metro Rail Corporation dedicated a pillar on Pusa Road to this school and for its children to do decoration work. This school was in news for bad reasons, including a steep hike in school fees. The school was established in 1953 by the late Pt. Girdhari Lal Salwan. The Government of India recognized his services towards society by releasing a postal mark in his honour on 25 December 2011.

The Mayur Vihur campus organized a colorful art parade for Independence Day in 2014, inviting participation from all schools within 20 kilometres (12 mi). The school art presentations started at the gates of the school and proceeded for 10 kilometres (6.2 mi).
