= Gharoli =

Gharoli Ghadoli
- Village
- Location in India
- Coordinates: 28.62089°N 77.33559°E
- Country: India
- State: Delhi
- District: East Delhi

Population (2001)
  - Total: 10,978

Languages
  - Official: Hindi, English
- Time zone: UTC+5:30 (IST)
- Postal code: 110096

Gharoli (also spelt as Ghadoli) is a village and census town in the Mayur Vihar Phase III area of East Delhi District in the National Capital Territory of Delhi, India.

== Demographics ==
As of 2001 India census, Village Gharoli had a population of 10,978. Males constitute 56% of the population and females 44%. Gharoli has an average literacy rate of 70%, higher than the national average of 59.5%: male literacy is 75%, and female literacy is 64%. In Gharoli, 17% of the population is under 6 years of age.
