= Kondli =

- Village
- Location in India
- Coordinates: 28.61464°N 77.32613°E
- Country: India
- State: Delhi
- District: East Delhi

Population (2001)
  - Total: 27,983

Languages
  - Official: Hindi, English
- Time zone: UTC+5:30 (IST)

Kondli is a village, census town and constituency situated of East Delhi district of the National Capital Territory of Delhi, India.

== Demographics ==
Kondli is a village on the outskirts of Trans-Yamuna region of Delhi, India. It is situated near UP border alongside Vasundhra Enclave and kondli. It is very well connected to Noida, Ghaziabad and rest of the Delhi.

It falls under Kondli legislative assembly constituency (Reserved) and East Delhi parliamentary constituency. Former cricketer Gautam Gambhir is Member of parliament from east delhi and MLA of kondli is MR Kuldeep kumar from AAP

As of 2001 India census, Kondli had a population of 27,983. Males constitute 56% of the population and females 44%. Kondli has an average literacy rate of 72%, higher than the national average of 59.5%: male literacy is 78%, and female literacy is 64%. In Kondli, 17% of the population is under 6 years of age. Kondli became an urban village around 1975. Although it is estimated that now the literacy rate is nearly 100%.

Kondli is well known for its wholesale markets.

New Kondli lies in Kondli constituency (East Delhi) and adjacent to Mayur Vihar Phase - 3 on one side and Noida sector-11 on other side and Vasundhra Enclave on another side. It is generally a resettlement colony which came into existence after 1990. Major development in this area came after 2001. It generally comprises block A, B, C, D. It act as a major entrance access to Mayur Vihar Phase- 3 and is situated along the Pragati Marg (Main Road). It lies near to Maharaja Agarsen College and Shaheed Rajguru college of Applied sciences. It is the major developing area of Kondli Constituency.(no- 56) and East Delhi Municipal Corporation ward No. =215.

This area could be easily accessed through Noida Sector -11 and Vasundhra Enclave.

Mostly people living in this area belong to Uttrakhand, Uttar Pradesh, Bihar and Rajasthan, people of all economical strata live here.

Block A mainly comprises wholesale ration markets which supplies ration to the entire ration shopkeepers of noida. People from far off places in Noida generally comes here to purchase monthly ration at cheaper rates. Shopkeepers in this block has formed a general reg. association called New kondli shopkeepers association. This area comes under the (SDM) District of Preet Vihar, and EDMC district of Shahdara south, and Delhi Police governs this area from the Ghazipur Police Station.

Block B, C and D generally comprises residential area . The commercial belt and shops lies along the Pragati Marg which are in general wholesale shops for ration, stationary, inverter and batteries.

A Newly Janta Housing Scheme is constructed besides the Block - B.

Places of religious interests in the area include:

- Shiv Shakti Mandir
- Mosque where especially people from far-off (Noida) on Friday come to offer zuma during day.

Because of the multi-lingual composition of the population, this colony wears, to some extent, a resemblance of metropolitan accommodation of difference of tongues which is uncharacteristic of Delhi, practically a monolingual city.

A subsidiary pumping ground of Delhi Jal board is there with a big ground for water harvesting system. Recentlym the ex-chief minister Sheila Dikshit has inaugurated 51st electric station of BSES in Block -A. There are two large public parks in this area named Smriti Vana and Kondli-Gharoli.

Two major petrol pumps are in the area; the Ruchika Petrol Pump and the Sobhagya Gas Agency which is the distributor of Bharatgas. Kondli area have three nursing homes viz. SANKHWAR HOSPITAL, RAJ RANI NURSING HOME, SAI NURSING HOME.

A monorail station has been proposed for this area.
