= Free School Under the Bridge =

Private school in Delhi, India

Free School Under the Bridge Delhi

Location
- East Delhi, Delhi; India; 28.6229°N 77.2758°E

Information
- Type: Private school
- Established: 2009
- Founder: Laxmi Chandra
- Staff: 6
- Campus type: Urban
- Affiliation: Unrecognised

The Free School Under the Bridge is a private school in Delhi, India. It provides free-of-cost tuition to underprivileged children. Almost all the students come from the slums situated adjacent to the Yamuna river and are enrolled in nearby government-run schools. Started in 2006 by grocery shop owner Rajesh Kumar Sharma with just two children, the school now has a strength of more than 300 students. Seven teachers volunteering in their free time help these students to better understand their school curriculum. The school is run in two shifts with a morning shift for boys and an afternoon shift for girls. It has no permanent building and its makeshift campus is situated under a Delhi Metro bridge with pillars serving as its boundary marker and blackboards painted on a wall of Yamuna Bank Metro Depot. It receives no help from either the government or any non-governmental organisation.

== History ==
The school was founded in 2006 by Rajesh Kumar Sharma, a grocery shop owner, for underprivileged children. Originally from the Hathras district of Uttar Pradesh, Sharma could not complete his Bachelor of Science due to financial reasons. The idea to start a school for children from poor families struck him while he was wandering near the Yamuna River and saw children playing in dust and mud near an under-construction metro bridge. He asked the parents why their children were not attending school, and they expressed their helplessness at being unable to afford their children's education and how there was no school in the neighbourhood. Sharma began the school by teaching two children. He believes that "no one should be deprived of education due to poverty and to fulfil his or her dream" and devotes more than 50 hours in a week to teaching in the school.

== Programme ==
The school provides free tuition to children already enrolled in nearby public schools, helping them better understand their school curriculum. It tutors students in learning subjects like mathematics, English, Hindi, science, history and geography. Students are encouraged to get enrolled in nearby government-run schools as it provides them opportunity to avail benefits like mid-day meals and free textbooks, among others. Many parents express their reluctance to send their children for tuition, as they need them to either work part-time jobs to support their families, or to take care of their younger siblings at home. Only after extensive persuasion do such parents allow their children to attend the school. Almost all the students come from the slums situated close to the Yamuna river.

The school is operated in two separate shifts: the morning batch from 9 a.m. to 11 a.m. is for boys and the afternoon batch from 2 p.m. to 4:30 p.m. is for girls. More than 300 students of the age group four to fourteen attend the school. Seven teachers besides Sharma volunteer to teach in their free time. Students bring their own textbooks and they are taught in groups.

== Campus ==
The school is situated under a Delhi Metro bridge close to Yamuna Bank metro station in East Delhi. It is a makeshift structure with a metro bridge functioning as overhead roof and bridge pillars serving its boundaries. Five blackboards have been painted on a wall of Yamuna Bank Metro Depot. There are separate toilets for boys and girls in the proximity of school. There are no benches and students sit on scraps of carpet or just the dirt. It receives no help or funding from either the government or any non-governmental organisation (NGO). A few NGOs approached Sharma to associate with the school but he rejected their help because of their lack of commitment towards the goal of the school and their questionable interests. Only non-financial contributions such as packaged food, water bottles, chairs and carpets among others are accepted.

== See also ==
- List of schools in Delhi
