= Krishna Nagar, Delhi =

Coordinates: 28.659751°N 77.282553°E

Krishna Nagar
- Neighborhood of Delhi
- Location in Delhi, India
- Country: India
- State: Delhi
- Time zone: UTC+5:30 (IST)

Krishna Nagar, Delhi is an urban ward situated in the East Delhi district of Delhi in the Trans-Yamuna area. It is surrounded by Vishwas Nagar, Gandhi Nagar, Preet Vihar & Geeta Colony areas.

The main areas under this Delhi Assembly constituency include the Ghondli Vill, Lal Quarter Market, Old Anarkali, Jagatpuri, Ram Nagar, Ram Nagar Extension, East Krishna Nagar, Krishna Nagar Blocks A through K, Krishna Nagar Extension, Shivpuri, Shivpuri Extension, Arjun Nagar, Old Arjun Nagar, Kanti Nagar, Radhey Puri, Rashid Market, Chander Nagar, New Layal Pur and New Layal Pur Extn., West Azad Nagar and Khureji Khas.

The Lal Quarter market is the main attraction of Krishna Nagar, featuring Lajpat-style jewelry, kurtis and dupattas, Sarojini-style style daily wear, saris, bags, accessories, and footwear.

== Metro route ==
The Krishna Nagar metro station is located on the Pink Line of the Delhi Metro.

== Notable residents ==
- Dr. Harsh Vardhan (Health Minister)
- Shri Rajendra Kumar Bansal
