= Hasanpur, Delhi =

Coordinates: 28.6330845°N 77.3076918°E

Hasanpur
- Village
- Hasanpur
- Interactive map of Hasanpur
- Country: India
- State: Delhi
- District: East Delhi
- PIN code: 110092

Hasanpur, Nangla is a village in the East Delhi district of Delhi, India. The village has traditionally been associated with Brahmins. Brahmins of the Jamdagni clan and is one of the fifteen historically recognised Gaur Brahmin villages of Delhi. Over time, urban expansion has resulted in significant demographic change, and the village is now inhabited by people from diverse castes, communities, and regions of India.The PIN code of Hasanpur is 110092. The village falls under the Patparganj Lok Sabha constituency.

Hasanpur is situated in eastern Delhi, in proximity to Patparganj and Mayur Vihar. Prominent landmarks in and around the village include Max Balaji Hospital, the Hasanpur Depot, the Patparganj Industrial Area, and National Victor Public School.

The village is largely urbanised, with rental income constituting a primary source of livelihood for many residents. Prior to land acquisition by government authorities, village landholdings extended up to Mandawali Village. Substantial portions of the Hasanpur Depot and the Patparganj Industrial Area were developed on land forming part of the revenue estate of Hasanpur village. The village received public attention when the Delhi Metro Rail Corporation (DMRC) approved compensation of ₹5.91 crore for easement rights over plots measuring approximately 700 m^{2}.Owing to its location and connectivity, the area has attracted offices of advocates practising at the Supreme Court of India.

== Politics ==
With increasing urbanisation, Hasanpur is no longer governed under the traditional village headman system (Pradhan or Sarpanch), unlike some other lal dora villages of Delhi. The village falls under the Public Works Department (PWD) constituency framework. The present municipal councillor is Mrs. Rachna Sethi of the Aam Aadmi Party, and the Member of the Legislative Assembly (MLA) is Pt. Om Prakash Sharma of the Bharatiya Janata Party.

== Notable people ==
- Late Pt. Shamshera Singh Jamdagni (Pradhan)
- Manohar Naagar, Advocate of the Supreme Court of India, former Vice-President of the Delhi University Students’ Union (DUSU), and a prominent NSUI and Congress leader
