= Laxmi Nagar metro station =

Metro station in Delhi, India

Laxmi Nagar

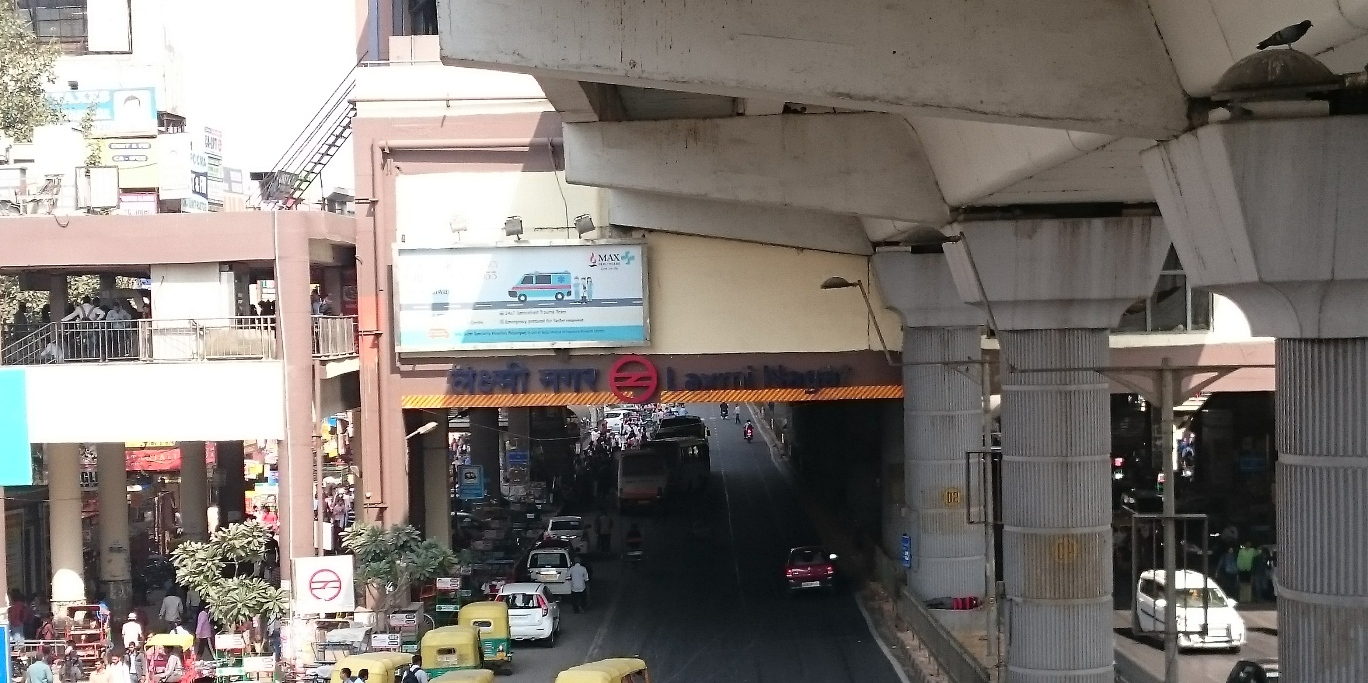

General information
- Location: Vikas Marg, Delhi 110092
- Coordinates: 28°37′50″N 77°16′39″E
- System: Delhi Metro station
- Owner: Delhi Metro
- Line: Blue Line
- Platforms: Side platform; Platform-1 → Vaishali; Platform-2 → Dwarka Sector 21
- Tracks: 2

Construction
- Structure type: Elevated
- Platform levels: 2
- Accessible: Yes

Other information
- Station code: LN

History
- Opened: 6 January 2010; 16 years ago
- Electrified: 25 kV 50 Hz AC through overhead catenary

Passengers
- Jan 2015: 41,262/day 1,279,123/ Month average

Services
Preceding station	Delhi Metro	Following station
Yamuna Bank towards Dwarka Sector 21	Blue Line	Nirman Vihar towards Vaishali
Route map
Location

Laxmi Nagar is a metro station located on the Blue Line of the Delhi Metro. The station opened for public use on 6 January 2010.

It is one of the busiest stations of the metro network as the neighborhood of Laxmi Nagar is home to numerous workers and students.

Public amenities include ATMs, toilets, travel kiosks, and vending machines. The nearby locality of the station has many coaching centres, bookshops, and restaurants. Moreover, there are a few hotels and numerous retailers of electronic appliances and mobile phones are located within the radius of 1 km of the station.

Laxmi Nagar metro st. sign board

== Station layout ==
L2	Side platform | Doors will open on the left
L2	Platform 1 Eastbound	Towards → Vaishali; Next Station: Nirman Vihar
L2	Platform 2 Westbound	Towards ← Dwarka Sector 21; Next Station: Yamuna Bank (Passengers heading towards Noida Electronic City may alight at the next station)
L2	Side platform | Doors will open on the left
L1	Concourse	Fare control, station agent, Metro Card vending machines, crossover
G	Street Level

== Connections ==
A nearby metro feeder bus provides connectivity to passengers of the Red Line of and New Ashok Nagar. The feeder bus begins the journey from the Shastri Park metro station and terminates at New Ashok Nagar. Laxmi Nagar lies in the middle of this route.

== See also ==
- List of Delhi Metro stations
- Transport in Delhi
- Delhi Metro Rail Corporation
- List of rapid transit systems in India
- Delhi Transport Corporation
