= Mayur Vihar Phase III =

Area of East Delhi, India

Coordinates: 28.6096°N 77.3303°E

Mayur Vihar Phase-3 is the third phase of the Mayur Vihar residential area in East Delhi. It lies in Kondli constituency close to the Noida border on one side and New Kondli and Gharoli on the other. It lies adjacent to Vasundhara Enclave, another prominent residential area of East Delhi. It lies on the eastern border of Delhi and shares Border of Uttar Pradesh with Noida as well as Khora Colony, a cluster of urban settlements bordering Ghaziabad. The Pincode of this area is 110096.

Ward : Gharoli Ward

Assembly constituency: Kondli Assembly Constituency

Lok Sabha constituency: East Delhi Parliamentary Constituency

Pin Code: 110096

Post Office Name: Vasundhara Enclave S. O

Mayur Vihar Phase - 3 can be accessed via four main entrances. The main entrance to the area via the NOIDA exit near to Sector 11 Noida, which is also called Noida More. It provides access to both NOIDA as well as South, East and Central Delhi, through Vasundhara Enclave. Likewise, the second route via Kondli-Gharoli dairy farm connects Mayur Vihar Phase-3 towards Kalyan Puri. The third route to the area is via Sector 11, Noida which connects Noida Sector-12/22 with Mayur Vihar Phase-3. It can also be reached via Ghazipur Landfill and the proposed paper market site.

Residential Area

The residential area here mainly consists of DDA Flats categorized as LIG, MIG, SFS and Janta Flats.

The LIG Flats are divided into three pockets, namely A-1, A-2, A-3.

The MIG Flats are also situated towards the outward stretch of the area. They are again divided into 6 pockets namely pocket 1,2,3,4,5& 6.

Also, within the MIG complex is situated the expandable LIG housing (mixed housing) alongside the pockets 2, 3 and 4.

The SFS Flats, which are of the same stature and worth as the HIG flats in other areas are divided into 4 pockets named from A to D. They also happen to be the most expensive and premium flats in the area.

New MIG Flats (also popularly known as Mini MIG) consisting of 480 flats were constructed around 2005 and again is divided into two pockets, Pocket A and Pocket B. They lie just opposite the Pocket D area of SFS Flats and adjacent to the Indane Gas Agency, HDFC Bank and Smriti Vana Park, a huge park that borders with Uttar Pradesh where people often go for morning and evening walks as well as a prominent area for the youngsters for sports and outdoor recreation.

Other than this, Mayur Vihar-3 also consists of Janta Housing Complex. There are three such pockets, namely B, C and D. Pocket B is further subdivided into eight pockets, namely B-1, B-2, B-3, B-4, B-5, B-6, B-7 and B-8. Pocket C is subdivided into pockets C-1 and C2 while pocket D as well into pockets D-1 and D-2 which are located towards the entry of Kalyan Puri through Old Kondli Market (Puraani Kondli).

Besides these, a new set of LIG Flats have been constructed most recently in the area adjacent to Pocket D behind the famous Hanuman Mandir of this area.

It is a good residential area to settle down and is home to a large population of people from southern part of India, particularly people from Kerala. It also boasts of its residential diversity with numerous Bengalis, Punjabis, Garhwalis, and Biharis, settled here.

Major Landmarks

There are three villages near Mayur Vihar Phase-3 namely, Dallupura, Kondli and Gharoli.

Main Market:

The Gharoli Dairy Farm also houses the cluster of market that spreads over a very large area and offers a wide range of needs ranging from garments, stationery, utility and hardware stores, electrical and electronics stores, supplies, a ration store and few eatery joints. There are a few DDA shopping complexes scattered around the area although they are not as active as the main market when it comes to the crowd.

Religious Places:

Places of religious interests in the area include:

Temples:

- Hanuman Mandir in GD Colony
- Shiv Mandir in GD Colony
- Sai Baba Mandir in Pocket A-2
- Sharika Mata Temple (Temple Park Pocket A-2) (For Kashmiri Pandits)
- Ishta Siddhi Vinayaka Temple in Pocket A-2 (for Tamilians and Malayalees)
- Kali Bari temples in Pocket A-1 and A-2 (for Bengalis)
- Sri Dharmashaastha (Ayyappa) temple in Pocket C-2 (for Malayalees)

Churches:

- Assumption Forane church, Syro-Malabar Catholic Church, 154-B Pocket A-2 (for Malayalees)
- Mother of Perpetual Succour Latin Catholic Church, (open for all)
- St. George's Malankara Catholic Church (for Malayalees)
- St. James Malankara Orthodox Syrian Church, Pocket A-1 (for Malayalees)
- St. Mary's Jacobite Syrian Orthodox Church, 76-A, Pocket A-1 (for Malayalees)
- St. Stephen's Marthoma Church, behind Pocket B-7, (for Malayalees)

There is also a Gurudwara named Gurdwara Guru Singh Sabha in Pocket A-2, a Jain Temple in the Janta Flats and a Masjid in GD Colony.

A proposed paper market has been in construction and it is said that Mayur Vihar-3 will be connected in the coming days to Ghaziabad as well. The place is known for its grand celebrations (mostly South Indian in nature) throughout the year.

Connectivity

Mayur Vihar Vihar Phase doesn't have a Metro Connectivity of its own. the nearest metro stations for the residents include Noida Sector-15, New Ashok Nagar Metro station and Mayur Vihar Extension Metro Stations on the Blue Line towards Noida electronic City.

Mayur Vihar phase-3 is well connected with South, Central Delhi and Noida through its bus service. It has its own bus terminal' near the Ghazipur paper market.

Buses terminating here include the ones plying on routes 34A, 34Ext, 118, 206A, 211, 348, 378, 398, 493 and 611.

34A and 34Ext ply between Mayur Vihar Phase-3 and Lado Sarai/Badarpur Border. All DTC buses on this route including AC service.

118, 211 and 348 ply between Mayur Vihar Phase-3 and Mori Gate. 118 is also the only bus from Mayur Vihar Phase-3 with a night service due to it catering to passengers to Old Delhi railway Station. 118 is a pure DTC service with AC Service as well. Buses on routes 211 and 348 are partly DTC run and partly cluster run. No AC service on these two routes.

206A ply between Bhajanpura and Mayur Vihar Phase-3. Cluster Run buses and is also the newest route to this area. No AC buses on this route either.

378 ply between Kendriya Terminal and Mayur Vihar Phase-3. All DTC buses on this route.

398 ply between Dhaula Kuan and Mayur Vihar Phase-3 via Noida DND Highway. Non AC DTC buses.

493 ply between Nehru Place and Mayur Vihar Phase-3 via Noida. AC and non- AC DTC buses.

611 ply between Dhaula Kuan and Mayur Vihar Phase-3 via Sarai Kale Khan and R.K. Puram. AC and Non AC DTC buses as well as Cluster Buses.

Cctv camera installation Service in Mayur vihar-3 Nainotech cctv security system cctv camera installation service provider without hidden charge & best cctv price service aria Mayur vihar phase -3 near by connect link

== Schools ==
Till 12th

- Bharti Public School
- Kerala School
- Ryan International School
- Salwan Public School
- St. Mary's Senior Secondary School
- Vidya Bal Bhawan Senior Secondary School
- Saint raman school

Till 8th

- Bharat bharti public school
- Luv Kush

Till 8th

- The Saviours School

== Banks ==
- Axis Bank
- Bank of Baroda
- Bank of Maharashtra
- HDFC Bank
- Punjab National Bank
- RBL Bank
- South Indian Bank
- State Bank of India
- Union Bank of India

• Indian overseas bank

== Shops ==
- Sweta Stationery Sports and Gifts
