= 2010 Commonwealth Games Village =

Over and out

The 2010 Commonwealth Games Village was the athletes' residence for the 2010 Commonwealth Games in Delhi, India. The village is spread over an area of 63.5 hectares (157 acres).

== Facilities ==
=== Residential zone ===
The Village had 14 apartment blocks, 34 towers and 1,168 air-conditioned apartments built by the Indian arm of the Emaar. The village was divided into four zones:

- Warli (Red)
- Gond (Blue)
- Madhubani (Green)
- Sanjhi (Purple)

It also included the CGA office spaces, the Polyclinic and the Casual Dining Space.

After the games, Emaar had the rights to sell 66% of the luxury apartments, which will be sold for Rs 18–42 million each (U$387,000-U$903,000)

=== International zone ===
The International Zone included the common areas with the Guest Pass Centre, the VIP Waiting Area, the Chefs de Mission Meeting Hall, the Mayor's Office, and the Media Center.

=== Training area ===
Beside the common areas, had training areas for Athletics, Aquatics, Weightlifting/Para-sport Powerlifting and Wrestling. There is an eight-lane 400 m Synthetic athletics track and an Olympic-size swimming pool. It also has gymnasium and fitness centre, steam and sauna facilities, physiotherapy rooms.

=== Dining ===
The Dining area has the capacity to accommodate 2,300 of the total residents. During the Games, the main dining service was opened 24 hours and provided free meal service.

=== Operational zone ===
- Access Control Point
- Vehicles Check Point
- Village Operations Centre
- Security Command Centre
- Workforce Centre
- Waste Management Compound
- Transport Mall
- Village Arrivals and Departures Accreditation Centre (VADAC).

Operational Zone I was located adjacent to the Training Area, while Operational Zone II was adjacent to the Residential Zone.

=== Transportation ===
Two free transport systems in the Games Village were used – the Internal Village Shuttle and the Bus Service. Customised cart and golf carts was also be available for Internal movement.

=== Security ===
- Perimeter security
- CCTV in basement and main entrance lobby for surveillance
- Video door phone at main door in every apartment.

=== Other features ===
- Wi Fi service all around the Games village
- The Village is classified as a non-smoking zone.

== Features ==
Since 2011, the Village is occupied by individual private home-owners. A 47.3 hectares (117 acres) picturesque site has been selected on the banks of river Yamuna for the purpose of construction of the games village. The project site was within the immediate vicinity of monuments and historical landmarks, combined with dense green natural covers on the sides.

=== Site and landscape ===
During the Games near 4000 bedrooms spread across 34 towers varying in heights (such as; 7 to 9 storeys high). The proposed apartment's blocks were arranged in site in a way so as to create visual links with heritage sites in the vicinity. The topsoil of the entire excavated site has been collected and stored separately and special measures have been taken for soil stabilisation, such as- stockpiling, mulching, and so on. Pervious paving has been provided extensively in the site. All the service lines and utility corridors on the site are well aggregated and ensure minimum disruption during future maintenance work.

=== Health and well-being ===
The sanitation/safety facilities for the construction workers are provided as per National Building Code 2005. These include provision of clean and hygienic accommodation, toilet facilities, purified drinking water, general store, a subsidised canteen, medical facilities, day care centre and onsite safety equipment, and so on. Significant measures have been taken to reduce air pollution during construction, such as – site roads are regularly sprayed with water; wheels of all vehicles are washed, and so on.

=== Water ===
Water efficient landscaping is being practised to minimise post construction water usage. This is being done by providing native species, efficient irrigation systems and by limiting lawn areas. The building water consumption also has been reduced by use of high efficiency low-flow fixtures. The construction water management on site is very efficient in terms of reuse of waste water and less utilisation of potable water in construction.

=== Building design and energy ===
The building design has also included the existing site features, such as, the visual linkages with historical monuments, solar geometry, and so on. Due to high density planning requirements, the design did not permit optimum orientation for all apartment blocks. As a result, the apartment blocks have equal exposure towards all cardinal directions. However, the critical facades are shaded and have high performance glazing to negate impact of direct incident radiation. The buildings are fully compliant with the Energy Conservation Building Code 2007. Several energy efficiency measures such as roof insulation, high performance glazing, energy efficient lighting and variable refrigerant volume (VRV) based air conditioning system have been provided to reduce the energy consumption of the apartments significantly.

=== Renewable energy ===
Solar photo voltaic system is proposed to meet the 10% of total energy requirements for internal lighting. 31% of outdoor lighting is provided through solar energy. Solar hot water systems are provided to meet part of water heating needs.

=== Other features ===
Waste water recycling and solid waste management for the entire campus were planned by the Delhi Jal Board at a macro level for the village as well as adjoining.

== Location ==
The games village is located near Akshardham Temple and Pandav Nagar in New Delhi on the banks of the River Yamuna.

== Controversies ==
Weeks before the opening ceremony Sir Michael Fennell, President of the Commonwealth Games Federation, wrote to the Indian cabinet secretary urging action in response to the village being "seriously compromised." He said that though team officials were impressed with the international zone and main dining area, they were "shocked" by the state of the accommodation. "The village is the cornerstone of any Games and the athletes deserve the best possible environment to prepare for their competition."

Four National Associations:New Zealand, Scotland, Canada and Northern Ireland demanded that their teams to stay hotels if their accommodation is not ready. The England and Wales teams arrived to Delhi on 23 September 2010, following satisfactory progress of improvement works at the village. The Scotland Team arrived on 25 September 2010.

== See also ==
- 2010 Commonwealth Games
- Concerns and controversies over the 2010 Commonwealth Games
