= Shreshtha Vihar =

- Residential Colony
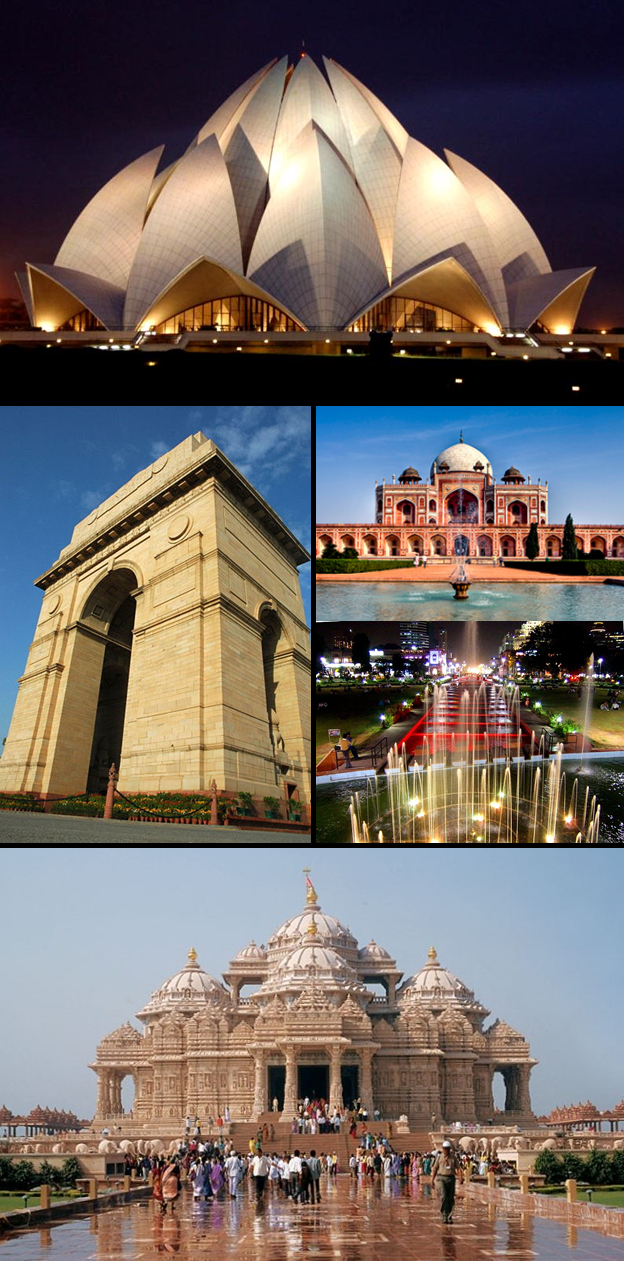

- Location in Delhi, India
- Coordinates: 28°39′33.93″N 77°19′3.37″E
- Country: India
- State: Delhi
- Established: 1956

Government
  - Body: East Delhi Municipal Corporation

Languages
  - Official: Hindi, English
- Time zone: UTC+5:30 (IST)
- Postal code: 110092
- Nearest city: Noida, Ghaziabad
- Lok Sabha constituency: East Delhi
- Civic agency: Municipal Corporation Of Delhi

Shreshtha Vihar is a posh residential colony situated in East Delhi which is adjacent to Uttar Pradesh. It consists mainly of kothis and villas. There are two apartments called Vivek Apartment and Gharonda Apartment. It is an area within Anand Vihar locality in East Delhi. Its PIN code is 110092.

Yamuna Sports Complex serves as the sports hub. Nearby localities are Jagriti Enclave, Surajmal Vihar, Hargovind Enclave and AGCR Enclave. D.A.V Public School Sreshtha Vihar is also closeby. The colony has a Hindu temple and a community center for celebrating small occasions and has a central park. Nearby metro stations are Karkarduma and Anand Vihar on the blue line and Karkarduma court on the newly constructed pink line of Delhi Metro.

The area features a commercial marketplace equipped with essential local amenities, including a branch of the State Bank of India (SBI), a Life Insurance Corporation (LIC) office, stationary stores, department stores and tailoring services.

It also has a garment manufacturing unit, a homeopathy office, barber saloons, eating joints, medical shops and clinics.

In May 2018, the market was renovated and a modern public toilet was added.
