= Uttara Guruvayurappan Temple =

Hindu temple in India

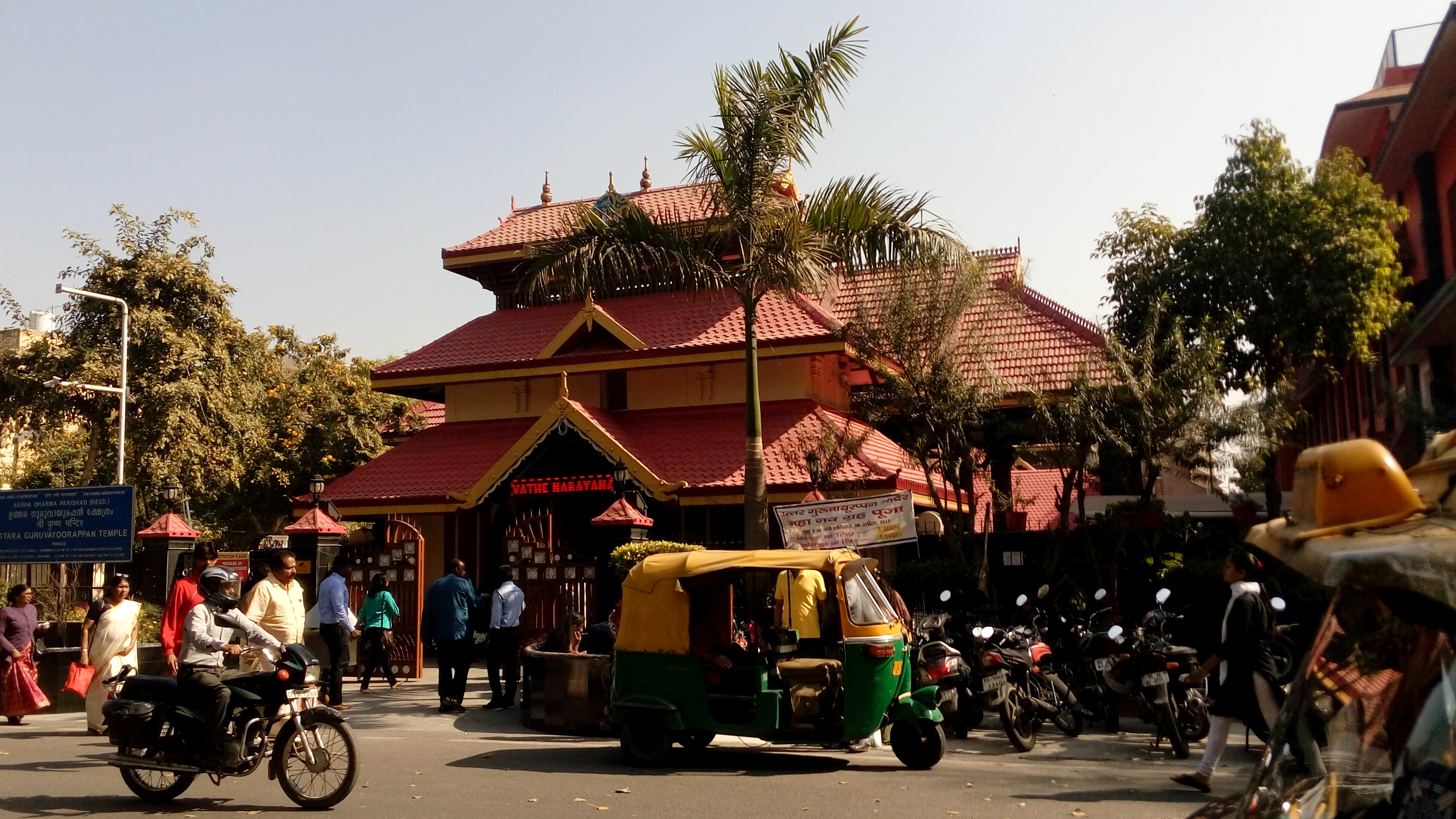
- Main gopuram

- Location in Delhi Uttara Guruvayurappan Temple (India)

Religion
- Affiliation: Hinduism
- Deity: Guruvayurappan (Krishna)

Location
- Location: Mayur Vihar Phase 1, Delhi
- Country: India
- Coordinates: 28°36′13″N 77°17′52″E

Architecture
- Type: Kerala Architecture
- Creator: Arsha Dharma Parishad
- Completed: 17 May 1989

Website
- www.uttaraguruvayurappan.org

Uttara Guruvayurappan Temple is a Hindu Temple located at Mayur Vihar-I in Delhi. The temple is dedicated to Shri Krishna, who is worshiped as Guruvayurappan, the deity of the famous Sri Krishna Temple in Guruvayur town in the state of Kerala. The Temple was founded on 17 May 1983. This temple is most revered by the Malayali and Tamil communities in Delhi.

== Architecture ==
The temple complex was built in the Kerala style of Architecture with two main gopurams at the eastern and western sides. The sanctum sanctorum is separated into two chambers and houses the idols of Krishna and Bhagavati. Besides the main Krishna Temple, the complex contains small temples dedicated to Ganapati, Shiva and Ayyappa and a replica of Sarpa Kavu dedicated to Naga Devatas (snake deities).

== See also ==
- Guruvayur Temple
