= Preet Vihar metro station =

Metro station in Delhi, India

Preet Vihar

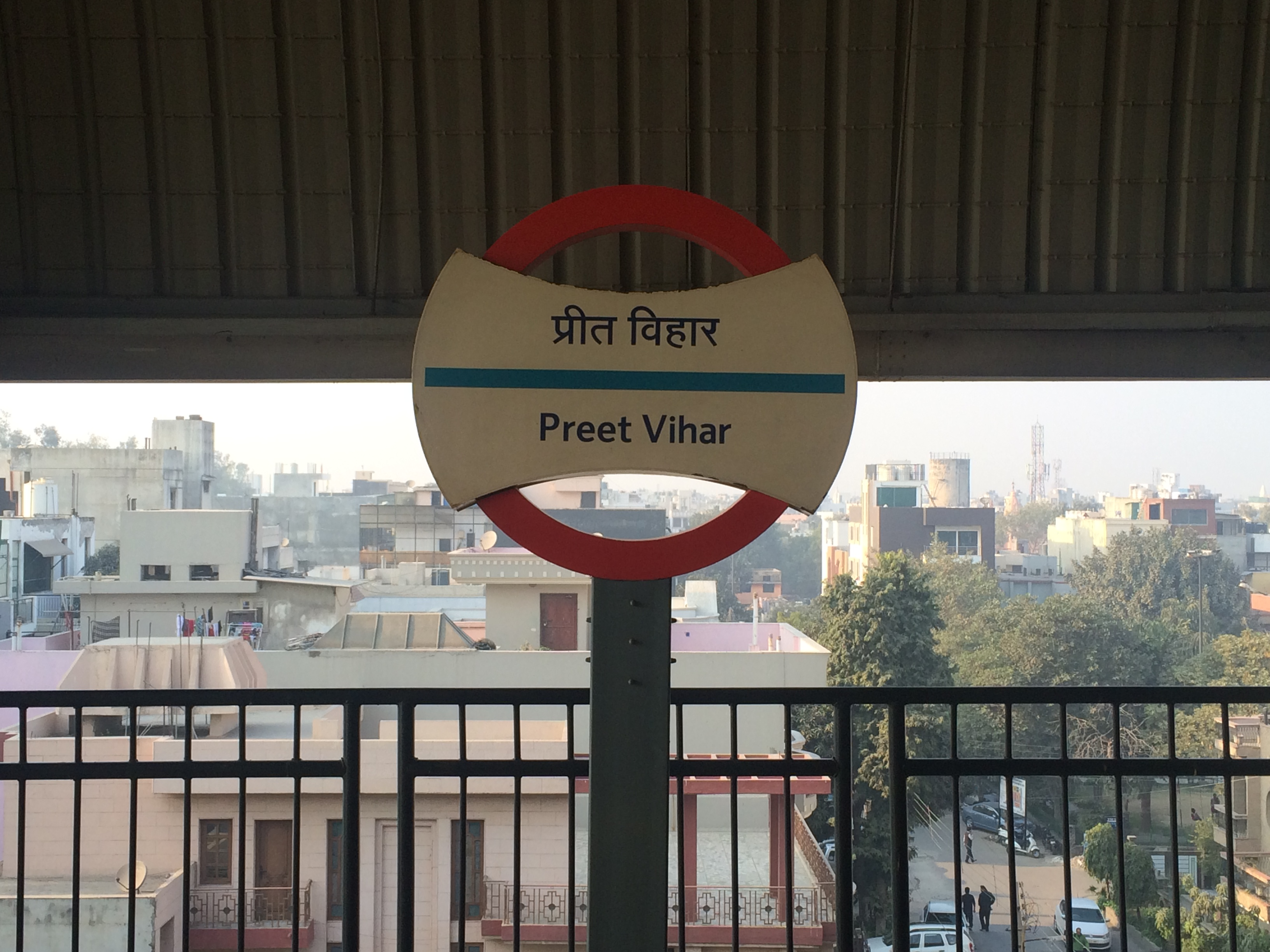

General information
- Location: Vikas Marg, New Rajdhani Enclave, Swasthya Vihar, New Delhi, 110092
- Coordinates: 28°38′29″N 77°17′42″E
- System: Delhi Metro station
- Owner: Delhi Metro
- Line: Blue Line
- Platforms: Side platform; Platform-1 → Vaishali; Platform-2 → Dwarka Sector 21
- Tracks: 2

Construction
- Structure type: Elevated
- Platform levels: 2
- Accessible: Yes

Other information
- Station code: PTVR

History
- Opened: 6 January 2010; 16 years ago
- Electrified: 25 kV 50 Hz AC through overhead catenary

Passengers
- Jan 2015: 13,691/day 424,406/ Month average

Services
Preceding station	Delhi Metro	Following station
Nirman Vihar towards Dwarka Sector 21	Blue Line	Karkarduma towards Vaishali
Route map
Location

The Preet Vihar metro station is located in Preet Vihar on the Blue Line of the Delhi Metro.

== Station layout ==
L2	Side platform | Doors will open on the left
L2	Platform 1 Eastbound	Towards → Vaishali; Next Station: Karkarduma Change at the next station for Pink Line
L2	Platform 2 Westbound	Towards ← Dwarka Sector 21; Next Station: Nirman Vihar
L2	Side platform | Doors will open on the left
L1	Concourse	Fare control, station agent, Metro Card vending machines, crossover
G	Street Level	Exit/Entrance

== Facilities ==
ATMs are available at Preet Vihar metro station.

== See also ==
- List of Delhi Metro stations
- Transport in Delhi
- Delhi Metro Rail Corporation
- Delhi Suburban Railway
- List of rapid transit systems in India
