= Pandav Nagar =

- Neighbourhood of Delhi
- Location within Delhi
- Coordinates: 28.614°N 77.275°E
- Country: India
- Territory: Delhi
- Constituency: East Delhi

Government
  - Type: Elected Representative

Languages
  - Official: Hindi, Punjabi
- Time zone: GMT + 0530
- Distance From Airport =30 KM Distance From Railway = 14 KM

Pandav Nagar is a residential colony in East Delhi, India. The back side of the colony is across the road from the famous Akshardham Temple. The majority of the population are Hindus and Sikhs.

== History ==
Earlier called Neem Ka Bangar (as mentioned in old land records), the colony is now called Pandav Nagar. The name "Pandav Nagar" originates from the term 'Pandavas' which according to Hindu Mythology was used during the Mahabharata Period, where the five Sons of King Pandu and his wife Kunti were together called as Pandavas.

The name "Pandav Nagar" was given by the Promoter and Developer of the Colony as this colony was surrounded by Indraprastha Estate developed by DDA on one side and adjoining the Indraprastha Extension CGHS on the other side. People started living here from 1960 the early settlers here are mainly from east Punjab who had migrated to Delhi are mainly Sikhs and Hindus who had helped in the establishment of the colony. They started buying land for agriculture and other works. Then they select and purchased land for Temples and Gurudwaras. The people had migrated here from last 10 years are mostly from up and Bihar came here very fast and the old peoples of the colony are disappearing.The Bihari and UP Hindus are nearly 40%, The Punjabi Hindu, Sikhs are 30% (mostly Khatri). Rajasthani, Haryanvi 10% and rest 20% are from other states mainly west bengal.

== Composition ==
Pandav Nagar divided into two parts, is a residential area, that is a well-established colony in the eastern part of Delhi, close to the Yamuna river, practically minutes away from Connaught Place, Anand Vihar Terminal railway station, New Delhi and Nizamuddin railway stations. This place is famous for its numerous shops and offices (like AIMIL Ltd.), institutes and hospitals, that it houses. Apart from this, it has residential apartments that offer good accommodation.

== Temples ==
Radha Krishna Temple in C Block is a fine temple complex housing the idols of a large pantheon of Hindu deities. The temples/ Gurudwaras is also the nerve centre of many cultural activities. The other temples/Gurudwaras include Gurudwara Singh Sabha, Shiv Hanuman Mandir, Hanuman Temple, Kali Bari (Ganesh Nagar), Shiv Durga Mandir (Ganesh Nagar), Digambar Jain Mandir, Shiv Shakti Temple and Gurudwara Akal bunga Nihang, Gurudwara Ganesh nagar, Mala Devi temple

== Medicare ==
1. RK Memorial Hospital
2. Shanti Nursing Home
3. Max Balaji Hasanpur Depot is just a 10 minutes drive away
4. Healserv
5. DermaCliniq

== Landmarks ==
There are many popular landmarks in and around Pandav Nagar such as Akshardham Temple, Commonwealth Games Village, Rajendra Ashram, D Park, Mother Dairy Kela Godam Pandav Nagar Ganesh Nagar Complex, Sanjay Lake with Delhi's first Adventure Park.

== Connectivity ==
Pandav Nagar is well connected with other parts of Delhi by roads and metro rail. Buses ply the roads, with other modes of transport supplementing the transport options. Anand Vihar Inter State Bus terminal (ISBT) is quite close, too. The nearest metro station is Akshardham station itself, which makes it well connected to various parts of New Delhi.

== Other colonies near Pandav Nagar ==
- Mayur Vihar Phase1, Patparganj, IP Extension, Ganesh Nagar and South Ganesh Nagar, Shakarpur, Laxmi Nagar.
