= Yamuna Bank metro station =

Metro station in Delhi, India

Yamuna Bank

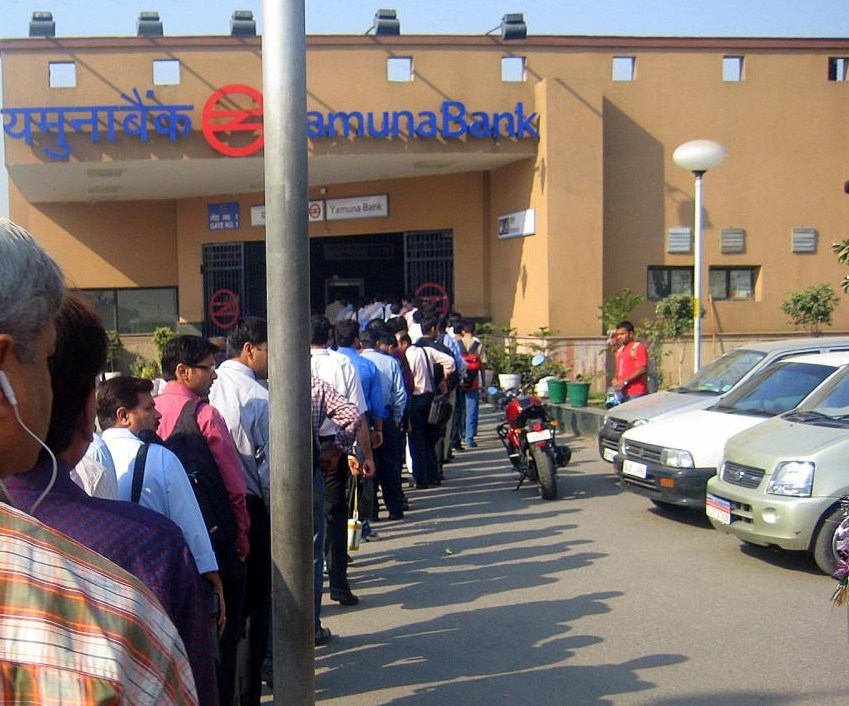

General information
- Location: Yamuna Bank, New Delhi, 110092
- Coordinates: 28°37′24″N 77°16′05″E
- System: Delhi Metro station
- Owner: Delhi Metro
- Line: Blue Line
- Platforms: Island platform; Platform-1 → Noida Electronic City; Platform-2 → Dwarka Sector 21; Platform-3 → Vaishali; Platform-4 → Dwarka Sector 21
- Tracks: 4

Construction
- Structure type: At-grade
- Parking: Available
- Accessible: Yes

Other information
- Station code: YB

History
- Opened: 10 May 2009; 17 years ago
- Electrified: 25 kV 50 Hz AC overhead catenary

Passengers
- Jan 2015: 1,551/day 48,088/ Month average

Services
Preceding station	Delhi Metro	Following station
Indraprastha towards Dwarka Sector 21	Blue Line	Akshardham towards Noida Electronic City
Indraprastha towards Dwarka Sector 21	Blue Line	Laxmi Nagar towards Vaishali
Route map
Location

Yamuna Bank metro station is located on the Blue Line of the Delhi Metro. It serves as a transfer point between the Noida branch (Line 3) and the Vaishali branch (Line 4) of the Blue Line. Cross-platform transfers in the same direction of travel are available through two island platforms.

The Free School Under the Bridge, an informal school for underprivileged children, is situated beneath the Delhi Metro viaduct near Yamuna Bank station.

The Yamuna Bank depot is situated adjacent to the at-grade station. It serves as a maintenance and stabling facility for Delhi Metro trains, with facilities for train washing, technical repairs and stabling of nearly 40 trains.

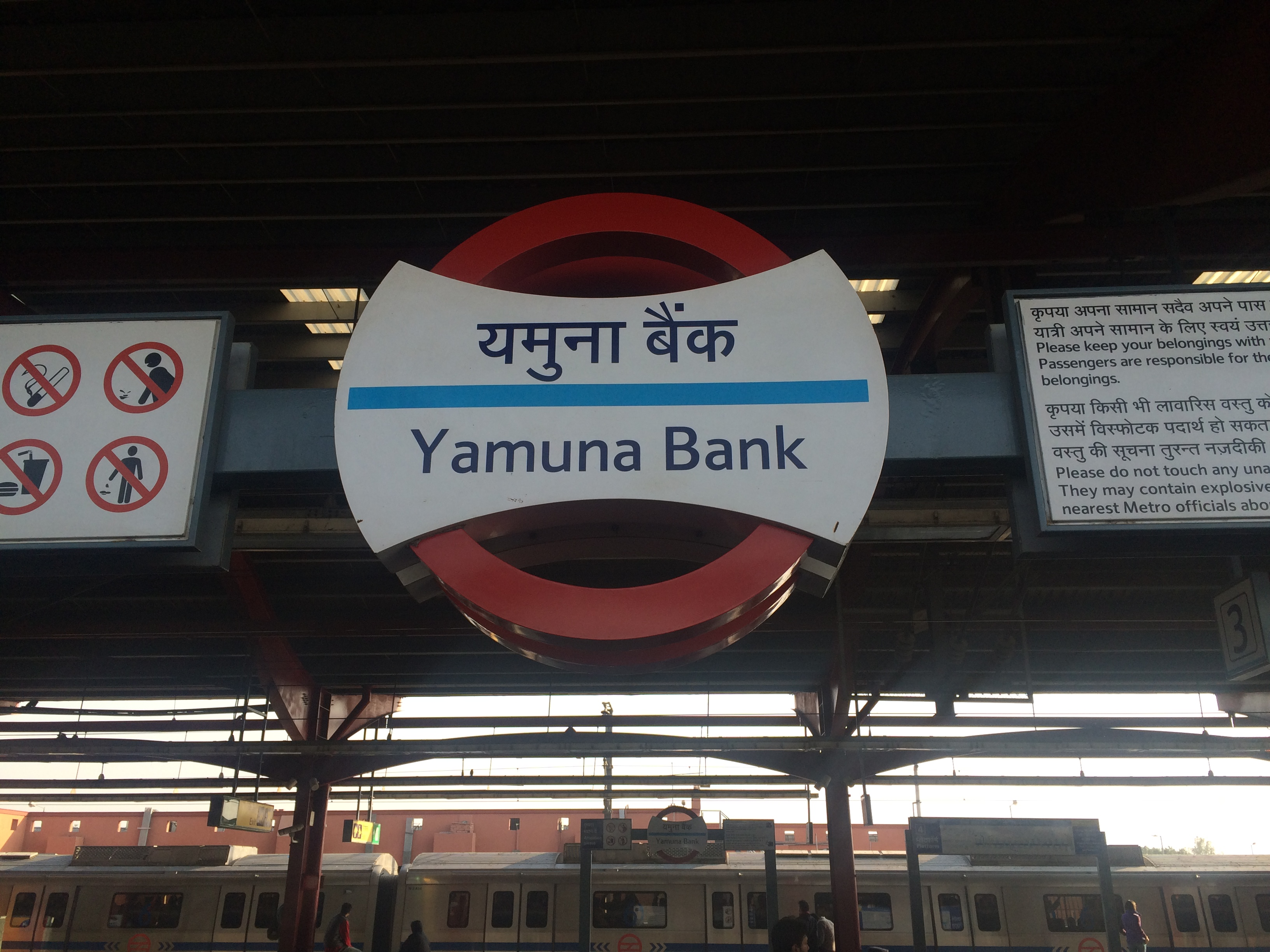
Yamuna Bank metro station

== Station layout ==
G	Street Level	Exit / Entrance
C	Concourse	Fare control, station agent
B2	Platform 1 South East bound	Towards → Noida Electronic City; Next Station: Akshardham
B2	Island platform | P1 Doors will open on the right | P3 Doors will open on the left
B2	Platform 3 East bound	Towards → Vaishali; Next Station: Laxmi Nagar
B3	Platform 2 West bound	Towards ← Dwarka Sector 21; Next Station: Indraprastha
B3	Island platform | P2 Doors will open on the left | P4 Doors will open on the right
B3	Platform 4 West bound	Towards ← Dwarka Sector 21; Next Station: Indraprastha

== See also ==
- List of Delhi Metro stations
- Transport in Delhi
- Delhi Metro Rail Corporation
- Delhi Suburban Railway
- List of rapid transit systems in India
