= Akshardham metro station (Delhi Metro) =

Metro station in Delhi, India

Akshardham

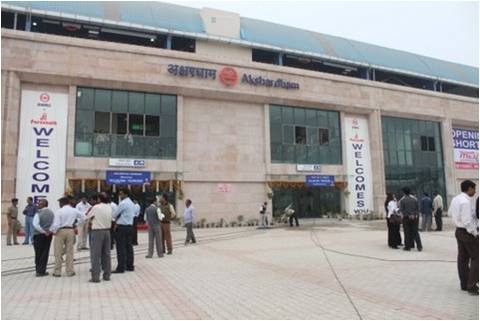

General information
- Location: Noida Link Rd, Patparganj, New Delhi, Delhi 110092
- Coordinates: 28°37′04″N 77°16′46″E
- System: Delhi Metro station
- Owner: Delhi Metro Rail Corporation Ltd. (DMRC)
- Line: Blue Line
- Platforms: Side platform; Platform-1 → Noida Electronic City; Platform-2 → Dwarka Sector 21
- Tracks: 2

Construction
- Structure type: Elevated
- Platform levels: 2
- Parking: Available
- Accessible: Yes

Other information
- Station code: ASDM

History
- Opened: 12 November 2009; 16 years ago
- Electrified: 25 kV 50 Hz AC through overhead catenary

Passengers
- 2015: Average 17,076 /day 529,341 (Month of Jan)

Services
Preceding station	Delhi Metro	Following station
Yamuna Bank towards Dwarka Sector 21	Blue Line	Mayur Vihar-I towards Noida Electronic City
Route map
Location

The Akshardham metro station is a Delhi Metro station on the Blue Line operated by the Delhi Metro Rail Corporation Limited. The station lies between Pandav Nagar on one side and the Akshardham Mandir and the Commonwealth Games Village on the other. It was designed to be a complement of the Akshardham Mandir located nearby. When it was completed on 12 November 2009, the station was the tallest metro station within the Delhi Metro system (the record is currently held by the Mayur Vihar-I metro station on the Pink Line). The station serves commuters travelling to the mandir and provided transport for the 2010 Commonwealth Games.

== Station layout ==
L2	Side platform | Doors will open on the left
L2	Platform 1 South East bound	Towards → Noida Electronic City; Next Station: Mayur Vihar-I Change at the next station for Pink Line
L2	Platform 2 Westbound	Towards ← Dwarka Sector 21; Next Station: Yamuna Bank (Passengers heading towards Vaishali may alight at the next station)
L2	Side platform | Doors will open on the left
L1	Concourse	Fare control, station agent, Metro Card vending machines, crossover
G	Street level	Exit/Entrance

== Facilities ==
ATMs are available at Akshardham metro station are HDFC Bank, Punjab National Bank, Yes Bank.

== See also ==
- List of Delhi Metro stations
- Transport in Delhi
- Delhi Metro Rail Corporation
- Delhi Suburban Railway
