= Mandawali Fazalpur, Delhi =

Mandawali Fazalpur is a political constituency in East Delhi. It is one of the largest villages in the world, as well as one of the oldest villages in Delhi. It is home to one of the largest markets in East Delhi. Previously an unauthorized colony, Mandawali was regularized in 2012. It falls under the jurisdiction of the Municipal Corporation of Delhi. The area is known for having one of the most affordable markets for vegetables and fruits. The population primarily consists of Brahmins(jamdagni clan) and Gujjars(nagar and dedha).

== Neighborhoods ==
- Ghazipur Village
- A Block
- Hasanpur Village
- Sewa Sadan Block
- Ooncha
- Fatakwali Sabzi Mandi
- Oonchewali Sabzi Mandi
- Railway Colony
- Urja Vihar
- Shiv Mandir Road
- B Block Mandawali
- Shanti Marg
- Vinod Nagar East
- Vinod Nagar West
- Allah Colony
