= Nirman Vihar metro station =

Metro station in Delhi, India

Nirman Vihar

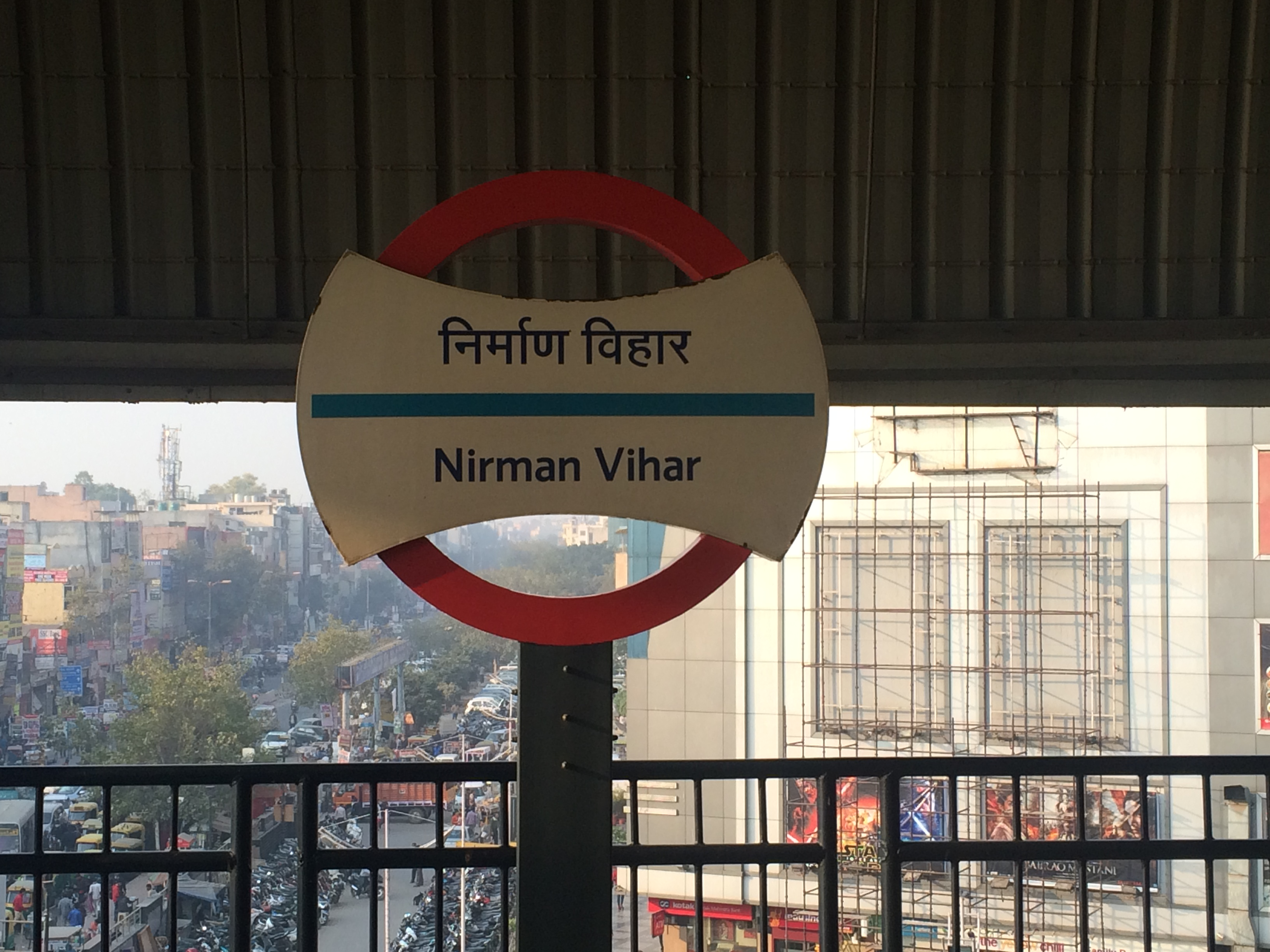

General information
- Location: Vikas Marg, Delhi
- Coordinates: 28°38′12″N 77°17′12″E
- System: Delhi Metro station
- Owner: Delhi Metro
- Line: Blue Line
- Platforms: Side platform; Platform-1 → Vaishali; Platform-2 → Dwarka Sector 21
- Tracks: 2

Construction
- Structure type: Elevated
- Platform levels: 2
- Accessible: Yes

Other information
- Station code: NV

History
- Opened: 6 January 2010; 16 years ago
- Electrified: 25 kV 50 Hz AC through overhead catenary

Services
Preceding station	Delhi Metro	Following station
Laxmi Nagar towards Dwarka Sector 21	Blue Line	Preet Vihar towards Vaishali
Route map
Location

The Nirman Vihar metro station is located on the Blue Line of the Delhi Metro.
There's no parking facility by the metro station authority but passengers have the option to park their vehicles in the parking lot of the V3S mall, which is right next to the metro station.

Like most of the other metro stations, there are four entry/exit gates here. Public amenities at Nirman Vihar metro station includes a Sulabh Complex (paid service). There are a number of outlets like Buddy's in the metro station premises. A couple of them are at the concourse level and one is at the entrance of gate number 2, which is near the entrance of V3S mall.

Near the metro station, besides the V3S mall, there is PSK (Coffee Home), Scope Minar and several commercial office buildings. There's the famous Veer Savarkar Marg, also known as Mini Nehru Place, a technology hub. Moreover, there are showrooms of big clothing and jewelry brands. Just below the metro station is the Nirman Vihar Bus Stand, from where passengers can board buses for I.T.O, Khureji, Jheel, Pandav Nagar and other areas which are not connected to Delhi Metro.

== Station layout ==
L2	Side platform | Doors will open on the left
L2	Platform 1 Eastbound	Towards → Vaishali; Next Station: Preet Vihar
L2	Platform 2 Westbound	Towards ← Dwarka Sector 21; Next Station: Laxmi Nagar
L2	Side platform | Doors will open on the left
L1	Concourse	Fare control, station agent, Metro Card vending machines, crossover
G	Street Level	Exit/Entrance

== See also ==
- List of Delhi Metro stations
- Transport in Delhi
- Delhi Metro Rail Corporation
- Delhi Suburban Railway
