= Sanjay Lake =

- संजय झील (Hindi)
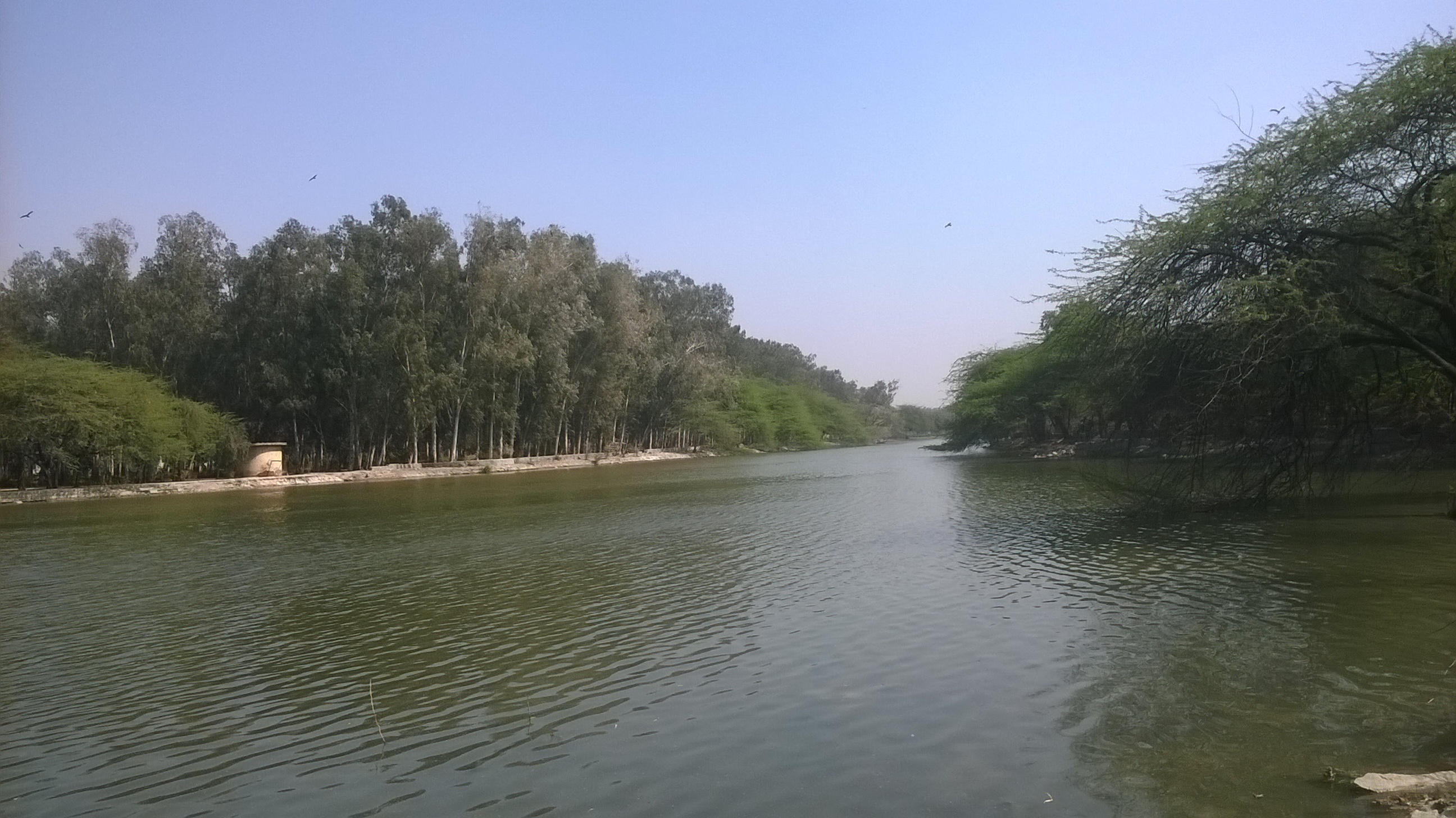
- Sanjay Lake in New Delhi, India

- Location within Delhi
- Location: Trilokpuri, East Delhi, India
- Coordinates: 28°36′51″N 77°18′14″E
- Type: artificial lake
- Etymology: Sanjay Gandhi
- Managing agency: DDA (1982-2009); Delhi Tourism Department (2009 – present)
- Built: 1982
- Surface area: 17 ha (0.066 sq mi)
- Settlements: Delhi

Sanjay Lake is an artificial lake developed by Delhi Development Authority (DDA) in Trilokpuri in East Delhi, India, adjoining Mayur Vihar II residential area. The lake is Spread over an area of approximately 17 hectares (42 acres) in the middle of a 69 hectares (170 acres) forest area, also known as Sanjay Lake Park. Sanjay Lake was developed in the 1970s by DDA and opened in 1982. The lake attracts some migratory birds and has many indigenous trees. A well-laid-out fitness track is very popular with walking-enthusiasts.

== Geography ==
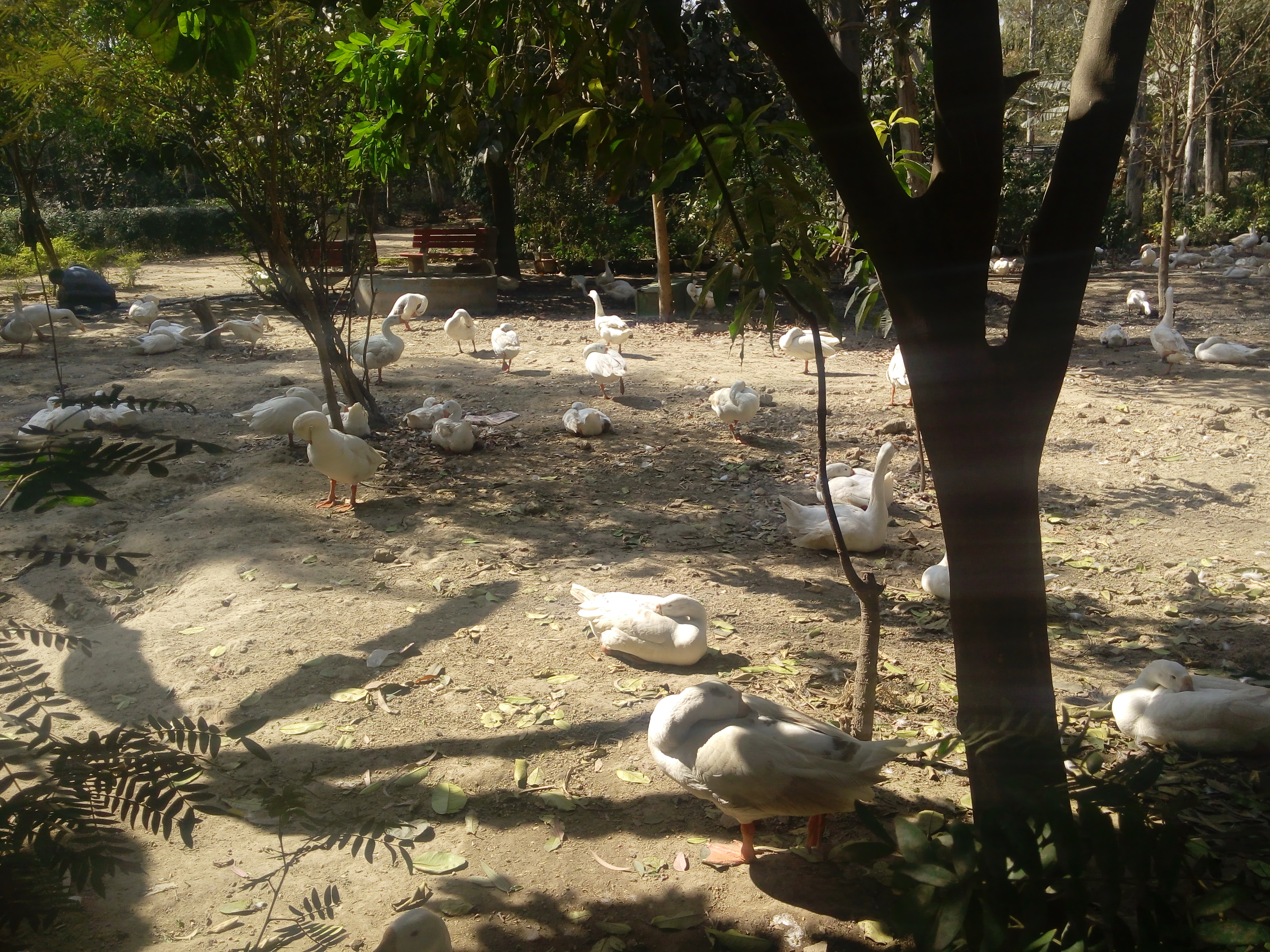
Ducks in Sanjay Lake Park, Delhi, India

The lake bound by Sanjay lake park, is surrounded by the residential colonies of Kalyanpuri and Trilokpuri on the eastern side and Mayur Vihar on the Western side. Sanjay Jheel is a huge rainwater fed lake. At times, the water supply was augmented by the back flowing Yamuna. During floods, it also received water through Hindon River channel.

Different types of birds can be seen here till February end every year. According to Local birders, the lake hosts 90 varieties of birds. Shovellers, Pintails, common pochard, tufted pochard, common teal, Indian spot-billed duck, yellow headed wagtail and pied wagtail are some of the birds that commonly visit the lake. The migratory birds mostly come to the eastern part of the lake, as the water is deeper and the area is free from human disturbances.

== History ==
Long before the trans yamuna (now known as East Delhi) area, thus called because it lay across the Yamuna River from the main city of New Delhi, was colonised by the government, this was natural low-lying area, land depression where rainwater collected, which was also fed by excess run-off from a cut in the Hindon River. The area had a number of villages like Patparganj in the floodplains of Yamuna and vast agricultural lands. Eventually, in 1970 this was developed by Delhi Development Authority into a long winding lake.

Initially the lake spread over 89 acres and together with the surrounding park it covered an area of 178 acres. However it was greatly shrunk after DDA started developing the area for its housing colonies, as colonies like Mayur Vihar, Indraprastha Extension (I.P. Extn.), and Patparganj DDA colonies started coming up in the 1980s and its catchment area was largely built over. Similarly, when National Highway 24 (NH 24) was built to connect the national capital to Capital of Uttar Pradesh state, Lucknow, which cut through the lake, and the Nizamuddin bridge was built over the Yamuna and its northern portion was lost and lake was reduced to present 69 hectares (170 acres). In the following decades, as land pressure increased in East Delhi, the lake further shrunk due to unauthorised construction, encroachment and sewage from near by slums. In 2009, the DDA handed over the park area and the lake to the Delhi Tourism Department.

== Overview ==
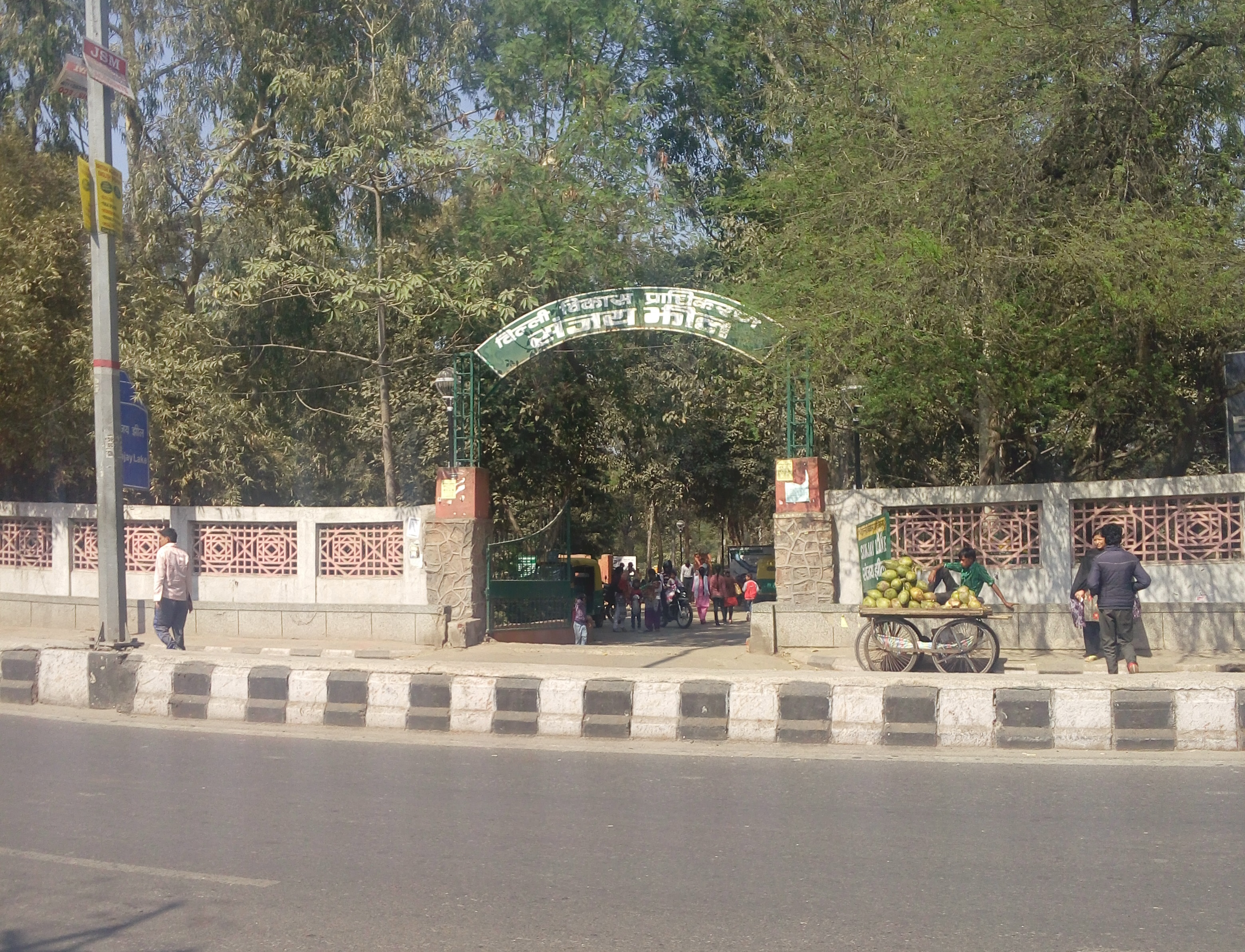
Entry gate to Sanjay Lake Park

Sanjay Lake is the tourist location of Delhi. This is a lake along with a long park. Sanjay Lake has a total forested area of 170 acres, and it is one of the longest park of East Delhi locations. Sanjay Lake is an artificial lake which is dependent on sewer and rainwater.

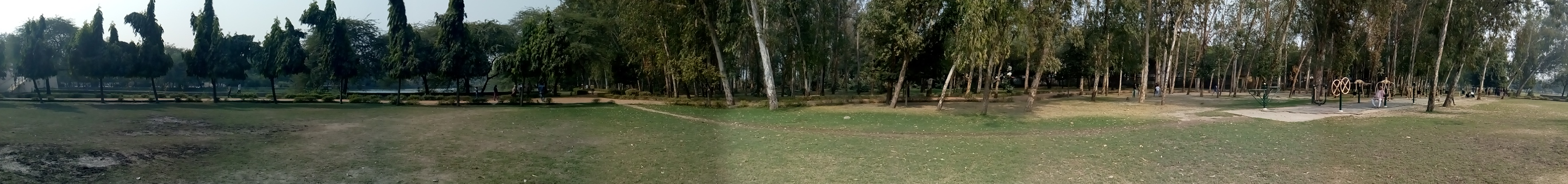
Playground in sanjay lake

There is also a Sanjay Jheel, within the Sanjay Van (Sanjay Forest) part of the South Delhi ridge, adjacent to Mehrauli and Vasant Kunj, Delhi.

== Adventure Park ==
The Adventure Park was inaugurated on 16 December 2015 by then Deputy Chief Minister of Delhi Manish Sisodia. The park has been set up by Delhi Tourism and Transportation Development Corporation (DTTDC) in association with Delhi Development Authority (DDA) under PPP mode. The Adventure Park is claimed to have been developed on a Wild West theme making extensive use of natural materials such as wood and jute rope and consisting of hut like structures. Spread across 6.3 acres, it has nine lawns-Great Plain, Battle Ground, Home Dome, The Den, Grazing Field, Bad Lands, Cattle Ranch, Cowboy Creek and a man-made beach. Apart from that, Delhi Development Authority (DDA) has also suggested twin corporate towers, a park, old-age homes and studio apartments for its ambitious ‘Lake City project’ at Sanjay Lake. A large field is also available to play cricket and football. School and college students used to play games here on weekends. Also DDA making organic fertilizers here.
