= Vasundhara Enclave =

- Neighborhood of Delhi
- Location in Delhi, India
- Coordinates: 28.61777°N 77.32961°E
- Country: India
- State: Delhi
- District: East Delhi

Languages
  - Official: Hindi
- Time zone: UTC+5:30 (IST)
- PIN: 110096
- Planning agency: EDMC

Vasundhara Enclave is a posh residential area located in East Delhi. The adjoining areas include Dallupura, Mayur Vihar, New Kondli and New Ashok Nagar. Vasundhara Enclave has about forty-four apartments (group housing societies).

== Facilities ==
=== Markets ===
- DDA Market (near city appts.)
- DDA Market (near Dainik Janyug appts)
- Vardhman Sunrise Plaza (opposite New Pragatisheel Apartments)
- Plaza market (near Evergreen Public School)
- Sarpanch Market (near Cosmos Public School)

=== Schools ===
- Somerville School
- Evergreen Public School
- East Point Public School
- Cosmos Public School
- Manav Bharti Public School
- Angels Public School
- Dashmesh Public School
- Govt. Sr. Sec. School
- Govt. Primary School

=== College ===
- Maharaja Agrasen College, University of Delhi
- Shaheed Rajguru College of Applied Sciences for Women, University of Delhi

=== Hospital ===
- Dharamshila Narayana Superspeciality Hospital
- Delhi Govt. Dispensary

=== Transport ===
- New Ashok Nagar metro station: Available facility Auto rickshaw and peddle rickshaw
- Mayur Vihar Extension: Available facility Auto rickshaw and peddle rickshaw
- Noida Sec-15 also called Gole Chakkar: Available facility Auto rickshaw and peddle rickshaw
- Connected till Shastri Park Metro Station by feeder buses
- The routes of few DTC buses like 118 (Mayur Vihar Phase 3 to ISBT) and 378 (Mayur Vihar Phase 3 to Central Secretariat) have been altered to connect Vasundhara Enclave with the buses.
- Feeder Bus route F-313 A starts from Maharaja Agarsen College and goes to Yamuna Vihar.

=== Sports Centre ===
- DDA Chilla Sports Complex which houses various sports facilities, gym, swimming pool, sports coaching facilities.
