= Patparganj =

Patparganj Gharonda Neemka Bangar
- Neighbourhood
- Location in India
- Coordinates: 28.612°N 77.292°E
- Country: India
- Union Territory: Delhi
- District: East Delhi

Population (2001)
  - Total: 34,409

Languages
  - Official: Hindi, English
- Time zone: UTC+5:30 (IST)
- PIN: 110091

Not to be Confused with Paharganj

Patparganj is a locality situated in East Delhi District of the National Capital Territory of Delhi, India, and is located near the border with Uttar Pradesh.

Patparganj has remained the Delhi Legislative Assembly constituency with East Delhi, Lok Sabha constituency, from 1993 to 2008, and remained after the delimitation of 2008.

== History ==
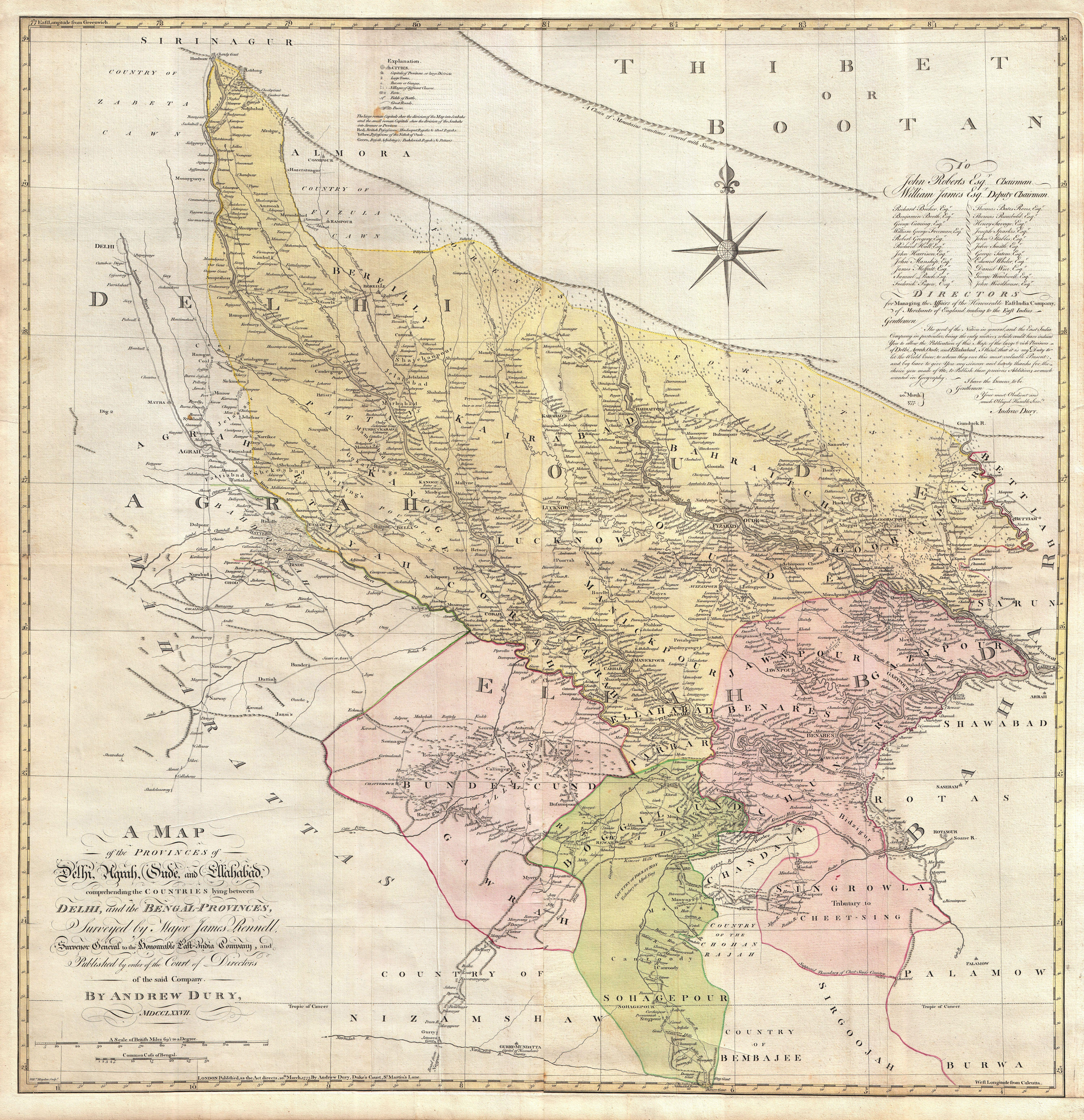
Patparganj (upper left, as "Putpergunge") in 1777 map of Delhi and Agra area

In the 18th century, Patparganj was a flourishing town and an important grain market of Delhi, where wholesale grain merchants stayed and large enclosures were built to store grain from the doab region and ferried across Yamuna River into Paharganj market, and the walled city of Shahjahanabad (Old Delhi) markets. Towards the end of the reign of Ahmad Shah as his political fortunes declined, and Delhi was wrought by internal fighting, the Mughal empire owed a debt of 15 lakhs to the Najib Khan Rohilla and Bahadur Khan Balauch, thus a settlement was reached and the revenue of village in the Ganges–Yamuna doab was assigned to them. However, on 26 November 1753, they left Delhi. After crossing the Yamuna, they captured Patparganj and seized the headman and the toll-offices. They left only after they received a ransom of Rs. 35,000. Much of the town was destroyed during the period.

In later history, Patparganj was the location of the Battle of Delhi, which took place on 11 September 1803 during the Second Anglo-Maratha War, between British troops under General Lake, and Marathas of Scindia's army under General Louis Bourquin, also giving the battle its local name, Battle of Patparganj. After the British victory, the city of Delhi surrendered three days later. Patparganj was almost a deserted town for years to come. A monument was later erected at the site, marked out by a surrounding ditch, commemorating Maj. Middleton (3rd Bengal Cavalry), Cornet Sanguine (27th Light Dragoons) and British soldiers who fell during the battle. The monument today stands as a well maintained sandstone slab at the Noida Golf Course and maintained by the authority.

Post-independence, Patparganj saw rapid development as Delhi spilled into the trans-Yamuna area, and by the 1990s, many apartment complexes and society apartment blocks had come up. Meanwhile, 175 acres of land was allocated to various group housing societies, previously earmarked for the development of an industrial area in the Delhi Master Plan. In 2010, a 690-m long six-lane flyover opened near the Patparganj Industrial Area', between Anand Vihar and Ghazipur crossing, to decongest traffic in the area.

== Overview ==
Patparganj (Indraprastha Extension) is home to a large number of group housing societies, and many multi-storeyed apartment blocks. Well-connected with neighbouring residential colonies, its nearby areas are Preet Vihar, Nirman Vihar, Laxmi Nagar, Pandav Nagar, Madhu Vihar and Mayur Vihar.

Patparganj is also known for its industrial area known as Patparganj industrial area. A number of prominent civil servants and former diplomats of India have retired here and had colonies and apartments built for themselves by the Government. These are also otherwise popularly known as the IFS (Indian Foreign Service) and the IAS (Indian Administrative Service) colonies.

Over the years, Madhu Vihar has developed into a busy market place of Patparganj. Balco market, named after a neighbouring apartment of the same name, is another popular community market in Patparganj that has ATMs, banks, stationery shops, Guitar School Guitarmonk, a Mother Dairy outlet and various other shops. Established in 2005, Max Hospital at Patparganj, was the first multi-specialty tertiary care centre in East Delhi. Patparganj has some well renowned schools such as National Victor Public School, Plato Public School and St. Andrews School to name a few. National Victor Public School is the first school to offer evening sports facilities to the residents of nearby apartments. The area is well connected by regular bus services, Auto rickshaw, Uber and Ola cabs along with Cycle rickshaws. The construction of Delhi Metro's New line will give a big boost to its connectivity with other areas of Delhi.

== Demographics ==
As of 2001 Census of India, Patparganj had a population of 34,409. Males constitute 55% of the population and females 45%. Patparganj has an average literacy rate of 70%, higher than the national average of 59.5%: male literacy is 74%, and female literacy is 64%. In Patparganj, 15% of the population is under 6 years of age.

== Politics ==
The area is part of the Patparganj Assembly constituency. Since 2025, Ravinder Singh Negi is the MLA.
