= East Delhi district =

- District of Delhi
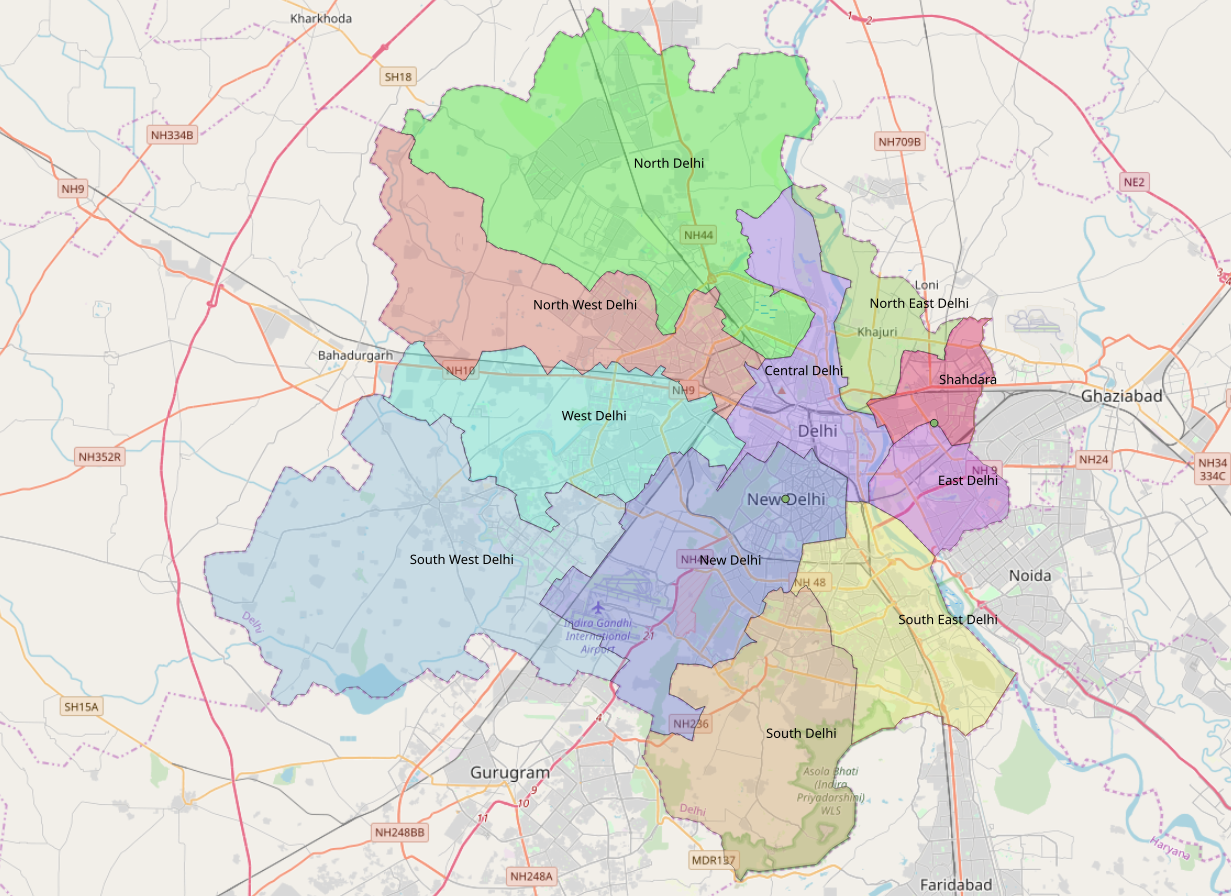
- Location in Delhi, India
- Coordinates: 28°38′24″N 77°17′24″E
- Country: India
- State: Delhi
- Headquarters: Preet Vihar

Government
  - District collector: Anil Banka, IAS

Population (2011)
  - Total: 1,709,346

Languages
  - Official: Hindi, English, Urdu, Punjabi
- Time zone: UTC+5:30 (IST)
- PIN: 1100xx
- Nearest city: Noida, Ghaziabad
- Lok Sabha MP: Harsh Malhotra
- Website: dmeast.delhi.gov.in

East Delhi district is an administrative district of Delhi in India. It is bounded by the Yamuna River on the west, North East Delhi to the north, Ghaziabad District of Uttar Pradesh state to the east, and Gautam Buddha Nagar District of Uttar Pradesh to the south. Administratively, the district is divided into three subdivisions: Gandhi Nagar, Preet Vihar, and Mayur Vihar.

East Delhi has a population of 1,709,346 (2011 census) and an area of 64 km^{2} (25 sq mi), with a population density of 22,639 persons per km².

== Demographics ==
According to the 2011 census East Delhi has a population of 1,709,346, roughly equal to the nation of The Gambia or the US state of Nebraska. This gives it a ranking of 284th in India (out of a total of 640). The district has a population density of 27,132 inhabitants per square kilometre (70,270/sq mi). Its population growth rate over the decade 2001–2011 was 16.68%. East Delhi has a sex ratio of 884 females for every 1000 males, and a literacy rate of 88.75%. The Scheduled Castes make up of 16.5% (281,482) of total district population.

=== Religion ===
Hinduism is the majority religion of the district, followed by 82.54% of total population, with Islam the second most followed religion with 10.46%. There is also a significant population of Sikhs (3.1%) and Jains (2.7%).

Religion in East Delhi
Religion	Percent
Hinduism	82.54%
Islam	10.46%
Sikhism	3.1%
Jainism	2.7%
Christianity	0.92%
Others	0.17%

== Visitor attractions ==
- Akshardham (one of the biggest temples in the world)
- Cross River Mall, CBD Shahdara
- Gandhi Nagar Market
- Lal Quarter Market, Krishna Nagar
- V3S Mall, Laxmi Nagar
- Yamuna Sports Complex, Surajmal Vihar
- Sanjay Lake
- Chota Bazaar

== Health institutions ==
- Guru Tegh Bahadur Hospital (or GTBH or GTB Hospital) is a 1500-bed government hospital situated at Dilshad Garden and is affiliated to and acts as the teaching hospital of University College of Medical Sciences.
- Amar Jyoti Charitable Trust
- Chacha Nehru Bal Chikitsalya, Geeta Colony
- Delhi State Cancer Institute
- Dharamshila Narayana Hospital, Vasundhara Enclave
- Dr. Hedgewar Arogya Sansthan situated at karkardooma
- Government of India Dispensary (Jagat Ram Park)
- Institute of Human Behaviour & Allied Sciences (IHBAS)
- Jain Neuro Center
- Lal Bahadur Shastri Hospital, Khichri Pur
- Makkar Super Speciality Hospital, Khureji Road
- Max Super Speciality Hospital, Patparganj
- Pushpanjali Hospital
- Saini Diagnostics, Shahdara (Diagnostic centre and COVID-19 testing centre)
- Santi Mukund Hospital
- Vivekanad Yogashram Hospital, Khureji Khas
- Walia Nursing & Maternity Home, Main Vikas Marg, Laxmi Nagar (Delhi)
- WHO Dispensary (Bank Enclave)
- Women wellness Clinic (Gynecology)

== Major localities ==
- Dallupura
- Dilshad Garden
- East Vinod Nagar
- Gazipur
- Hasanpur Village
- Krishna Nagar
- Laxmi Nagar (Delhi)
- Mandawali
- Mayur Vihar
- Mayur Vihar Phase III
- New Kondli
- Pandav Nagar
- Patparganj (I.P.Extension)
- Preet Vihar
- Seelampur
- Shahdara
- Shreshtha Vihar
- Trilokpuri
- Vasundhara Enclave
- Vivek Vihar
- Yamuna Vihar
- Azad Nagar
- Bahubali Enclave
- Balbir Nagar
- Dayanand Vihar
- Dilshad colony
- Durga Puri
- Gandhi Nagar
- Ganesh Nagar
- Geeta Colony
- Gagan Vihar
- Hargobind Enclave
- Jagriti Enclave
- Jhilmil colony
- Jyoti Nagar(east)
- Jyoti Nagar(west)
- Kanti nagar
- Kalyan Puri
- Khureji khas
- Mandaoli
- Mansarovar park
- New Ashok Nagar
- New Gobind Pura
- New Layalpur Colony
- Nirman Vihar
- Old anarkali
- Puspanjali
- Saini Enclave
- Savita Vihar
- Shakarpur
- Surajmal Vihar
- Surya Niketan
- Swasthya Vihar
- Tahirpur
- Vishwas Nagar
- Vigyan Vihar
- West Vinod Nagar
- Yojana Vihar

== See also ==
- Districts of Delhi
- East Delhi Municipal Corporation
