= Mayur Vihar =

- Neighborhood of Delhi
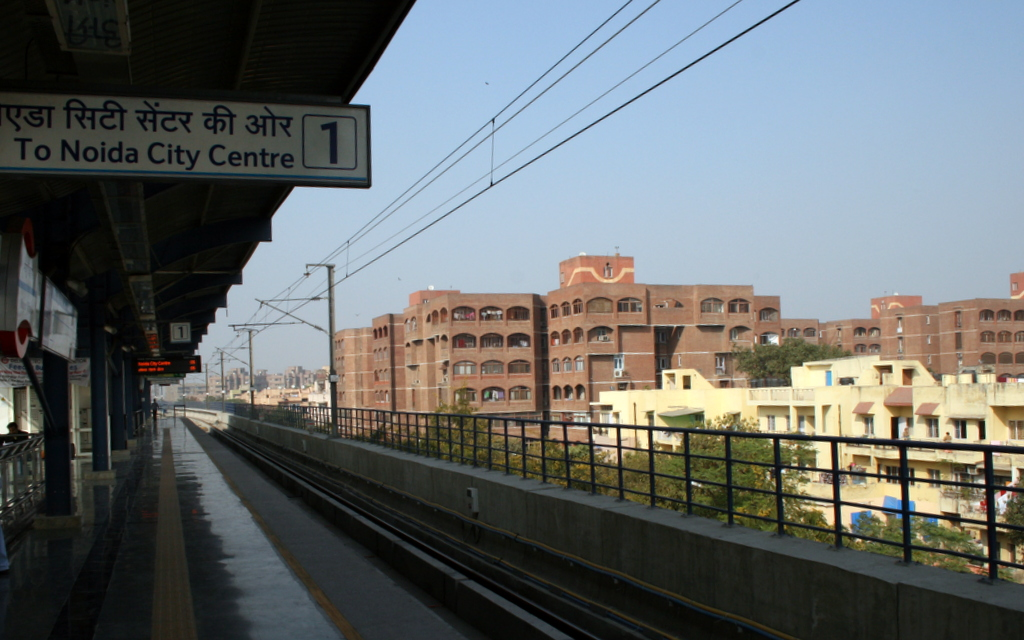
- Mayur Vihar from Metro Station

- Location in East Delhi, India Mayur Vihar (India)
- Coordinates: 28.6077°N 77.2992°E
- Country: India
- State: Delhi
- District: East Delhi

Government
  - Body: Municipal Corporation of Delhi

Languages
  - Official: Hindi, English
- Time zone: UTC+5:30 (IST)
- Nearest city: Noida
- Lok Sabha constituency: East Delhi
- Vidhan Sabha constituency: Mayur Vihar
- Civic agency: MCD

Mayur Vihar is a residential area on the periphery of Delhi, located in East Delhi, close to the city's Noida-Delhi border, situated just across the Yamuna River, and is divided into three distinct phases (sectors). As the name suggests, it has been the dwelling (vihar) of peacocks (mayur). Even today, the area has a closed sanctuary dedicated to the conservation of peacocks.

This residential area came into existence in 1979–80, back when the trans-Yamuna area, part of today's East Delhi was sparsely populated. The government decided to sell the Delhi Development Authority (DDA) flats to employees of Public Sector Units (PSU's) and semi-PSU's like the BHEL, among others. This was also an experiment to integrate people belonging to various economic bracket's i.e. High Income Group (HIG's), Middle Income Group (MIG's) and Low Income Group (LIG's) in one community. The residential units in Mayur Vihar are a relatively recent phenomenon and were developed in three phases. It is well connected by high-frequency buses and is serviced by the Blue Line and Pink Line of Delhi Metro.

== Mayur Vihar Phase I ==
=== Location ===
It is broadly situated between Pandav Nagar and Old Patparganj to the north, Mayur Vihar Phase 1 extension to the south and Trilokpuri to the east, with the Yamuna flanking it on the west. The area is accessible by the Mayur Vihar-I and Mayur Vihar Pocket-1 metro stations.

=== Residential Units ===
Phase I has DDA flats (organized into Pockets I-V) and Housing Co-Operative Society Buildings (e.g., Hindustan Apartments, Upkar Apartments, Ashiyana Apartments, Sadar Apartments, Glaxo Apartments). The first Phase I residents were mainly in Pocket III and Pocket I in the early 1980s. Later, Pocket II, Pocket IV (near metro station) and Pocket V were developed. The nearest village is known as Chilla Gaon that is now surrounded by housing societies. Samachar Apartments is one of the oldest apartments in the locality. People bought land and moved in prior to 1985 at very low costs. Now, the area is considered to be an expensive real estate market with the availability of two metro lines apart from the proximity to both the central business districts of Connaught Place, New Delhi - Barakhamba Road to the east and Sector 15-18 of Noida to the south.

Pocket V of the Mayur Vihar was latest colony allotted and developed by the DDA. It is on the Main Mother Dairy Road just opp to Sanjay Lake. Societies were developed near the Main Noida link road and the area is named as Mayur Vihar Extension with a separate Metro station of the same name.

=== Economy ===
There is no significant industrial activity in the area. The economic activity taking place within the area primarily emanates from property renting and leasing, the large number of food and beverage outlets that line the Shashi Park Road and Patparganj Road, as well as the numerous fashion & lifestyle outlets (including major brands such as Raymonds, Jockey, and Woodlands) on Patparganj road centering around Acharya Niketan.

A decades-old weekly market selling everything from garments, handicrafts, food, vegetables and other knick-knacks, have sat every Monday on both sides of Patparganj Road in the stretch between Jeevan Anmol Hospital and Sagar Ratna Restaurant (the crossing of Shashi Park Road and Patparganj Road). Over the years, the market has grown and now routinely overflows into roads on both sides of Patparganj Road. The vendors sit in the road parallel to Patparganj Road as well, in front of the Pocket 1 and Pocket 2 localities. Large parts of the area become almost off-limits to traffic despite no official order by the authorities. The nearest shopping mall (Star City Mall) is located in Mayur Vihar Phase -I extension (estimated 4–6 minutes drive).

== Infrastructure & Transportation ==
The 5.5 km-long Chilla elevated corridor Mahamaya Flyover in Noida Sector 18 and Mayur Vihar is set to be ready in 2022 with a reduced project cost of Rs. 605 crore. The flyover will rise from near the Mayur Vihar Phase-I and run till Sector 18, Noida. Currently, the Phase 3 of the Barapullah elevated corridor project is being constructed. It will connect Sarai Kale Khan and it's interstate bus terminus in South Delhi with Mayur Vihar-I in the east, significantly reducing the travel time between two sides of the Yamuna. The flyover is expected to reduce travel time for commuters between east and south-east Delhi – eventually easing vehicular congestion across the Capital. As of June, 2020 it was expected to be delayed beyond September end while the cost of construction soared by Rs. 324 crore.

=== Places of worship ===
- Hindu

One of the oldest and most prominent temples is Shri Subha Siddhi Vinayaka Mandir on Shahid Khudi Ram Bose Marg in Pocket 3. It was established in 1989 and has expanded multiple times since. The Uttara Guruvayurappan Temple in Pocket 3 is a prominent place of worship for the Malayali community.

The Mayur Vihar Kali Bari is the venue where the Bengali Hindu community celebrates all of their major religious festivities including Durga Puja. More than a thousand guests are a regular during all five days of Puja. It is situated just off Shahid Khudiram Bose Marg.

Other major Hindu places of worship include two large Jain Mandirs and the Shirdi Sai Temple.

- Christian

The Crossway Church is a Pentecostal Church in Mayur Vihar, at 182-C, 1st Floor, Street 18, Pratap Nagar, Mayur Vihar-1, Near Metro, Behind Mitra Di Chaap. St. John's Orthodox Church is also situated in Pocket 3.

Calvery Tabernacle Church is another Pentecosatal Church in Mayur Vihar, Delhi.

- Sikh

The restored Sikh Gurdwara on the east side of Pocket III near the police station on Shahid Khudiram Bose Road is the largest. There is also a gurdwara in Pocket 5.

- Muslim

There is a large Masjid on Patparganj Road in Adarsh Mohalla, in front of the P Block of Pandav Nagar. There is also a Masjid and Eidgah near Kotla Village.

=== Parks and Recreation ===
There are many parks and gardens, and is much greener as compared to the northern parts of East Delhi. Across the many green zones in the area, local residents doing exercise in the morning, playing cards (by senior citizens) and cricket by youngsters during the day are a regular sight. Consequently, the area is favoured by retirees and, a large population of whom call the area home, mostly living in the apartment complexes towards the Metro line side.

=== Education ===
Some of the major schools in Mayur Vihar Phase I are ASN International Senior Secondary School, Ahlcon Public School, Ahlcon International School, Queen Mary's School, Rishabh Public School, Amity International school Mayur Vihar and St. John's Model School

=== Notable residents ===
- Himanshu Joshi, Hindi writer
- Mazhar Imam, Urdu poet, winner of Sahitya Akademi Award and former director of DD Kashir
- Cricketer Unmukt Chand is from the area
- Susmit Sen of Indian Ocean used to live here
- Singer Papon also resided here for a brief period
- Comedian Kanan Gill went to Ahlcon Public School
- Olympic medalist Karnam Malleswari was a resident of pocket 4, Garud Apartments, for a long time

== Mayur Vihar Phase II ==
=== Location ===
Mayur Vihar Phase-II is situated adjacent to Sanjay Lake Park and NH24 highway/Meerut Expressway Highway that connects UP to Delhi. It is the first purely residential community that can be accessed across the Yamuna from NH24. Phase 2 was set up in 1984 and continues to be one of the most sought after localities in East Delhi. It was designed in 1984 in a way that each flat/apartment faces a park or green belt. The whole area is divided into "pockets" alphabetically named A, B, C, D, E and F. The Sanjay Jheel Park increases the aesthetic sense of this complex forming the boundaries of the locality on two sides, NH24 one and East Vinod Nagar and Kalyan Vas the fourth. Over the last few years, good care has been taken for the upkeep of the gardens and lawns, trails and play areas.

=== Locality and Conveniences ===
Phase II has shopping markets developed by DDA in Pockets C, A and E. In addition, Pocket B has a Local Shopping Complex. Residents have easy access to hospitals, nursing homes, clinics, diagnostic labs, and chemist shops. Beside, Bal Bhavan Public School, two Government schools, a private college, residents have access to other public schools in Central, East Delhi and Noida. There are nearby post office, police stations, BSES, DJB, RTO, large offices within 1 to 1.5 km. Nearby areas like Vinod Nagar, Kalyan Vas, Trilokpuri, Kalyan Puri and Pandav Nagar, provide much necessary support on utility services, housekeeping and hardware, wholesale groceries and flea markets (mandis) etc. Within Mayur Vihar Phase 2, there are large banks, restaurants, eat -out joints, hospitals ( Virmani), nursing homes, old citizens club, vocational center, fitness/sports centers, branded retail outlets, coaching centers which cater to the needs of the locality as well as account for visitors from nearby locations. The gated flavor of the residential area nevertheless has ensured that unnecessary public footfall through shopping malls/movie centers/transit areas/utility and business centers are not present within the main residential space, while enabling members from all ages and walks of life to intermingle socially.

=== Community and Culture ===
Phase II has many religious and community based institutions and makes Phase II the apt example of a completely secular, heterogeneous and vibrant melting pot of communities. While Phase II has acquired a cosmopolitan character over the years, a sizeable residential population of individuals from diverse religious groups and regions of India makes it offer a rich multi-cultural environment and rich diversity unique in its kind to the people living in the place. Neelam Mata Temple is identified as a major landmark for Phase-II. Purbo Delhi Kali Bari, Arya Samaj Mandir, Radha Soami Satsang Beas, Ganesh Mandir, Baba Balak Nath Mandir (established before 1984) Ram Mandir, along with multiple Masjids and Gurudwaras have flourished with the residents throughout the past 30+ years. There are communities of Tamils, Bengalis, Sikhs and Baniyas who ensure that the festivities happen across the year. All Pockets have their own Resident Welfare Associations (RWA) which work for the development and upkeep of their area for residents, including security, local issues, maintenance and cleansing.

=== Location and Approximate Distances ===
With the Delhi Metro Phase 3, Mayur Vihar Phase 2 would have a dedicated station inside Pocket C on the Mukundpur-ShivVihar line by 2016, though it would be named Vinod Nagar East (likely due to the voter base considerations). Anand Vihar Inter State Bus terminal (ISBT) is the nearest Bus Depot with it being at a distance of approximately 4 km is quite close too. Bus Route nos. 307-A, 319, 348(Terminate),349(Terminate),542 & 543 (in NH-24)and 391 having Mayur Vihar Phase 2 stoppages. There are RTVs and DMRC connectivity routes additionally.

Mayur Vihar Phase 2 is close to Akshardham, Patparganj Noida Sector 18, Preet Vihar, Laxmi Nagar, Indirapuram, Noida Sector 62 office areas, while having the proximity to Khan Market, Kaka Nagar, Lajpat Nagar, Pragati Maidan, Friends Colony on the other side of the Yamuna .

Akshardham:3 Anand Vihar:3 CP:12 km, Noida 7 km, Khan Market: 10 Maharani Bagh: 9 km, Laxmi Nagar: 5 km, New Delhi Railway Station: 12 km, Old Delhi Railway Station: 12 km, Nizam-Ud-Din Railway Station and Sarai Kale Khan Bus Terminal: 7 km, Maharana Pratap ISBT: 12 km, Anand Vihar ISBT and Railway Station: 7 km, Airport: 35 km.

== Mayur Vihar Phase III ==
=== Location ===
Mayur Vihar Phase-III Delhi 110096 is located close to NOIDA border on one side, Kondli and Kalyanpuri on the other side. The LIG Flats are divided into 3 Pockets, A-1, A-2, A-3. Also SFS Flats and pockets are named from A-D. Other than this, MIG housing complexes are also situated here. They are named in sequences of pocket-1-6. Inside the MIG complex is the expandable LIG housing which is pocket-2,4.

There are three villages in Phase 3, Dallupura, Kondli and Gharoli. Villages are also dominated by the Gurjar community, mostly belonging to the dedha gotra. It is nearby Maharaja Agrasain College D.U. And Ryan International School.

Mayur Vihar-3 can be accessed by three main entrances. One of the main entrances is via the NOIDA mod near to Sector 11 Noida, which is also called NEW Kondli mod. It provides access to both NOIDA as well as Delhi, towards Vasundhara Enclave. The second one connects Mayur Vihar-3 via Kondli-Gharoli dairy farm towards Kalyan Puri. The third one is via Sector 11 Noida which connects Noida Sector-12/22 with Mayur Vihar-3. It can also be reached via the barren land lying between Ghazipur and the proposed paper mart site.

=== Residential Units ===
New MIG Flats, Sector-G is a newly developed society with around 480 flats and is located just opposite to SFS flats, pocket D. Nearby Landmarks are HDFC Bank, Smriti Vana and Indane Gas Agency.

Mayur Vihar-3 also consists of Janta Housing Complexes which lie near the main bus stand. They are numbered from B1-8 and C1-2, etc.
