= Preet Vihar =

- subdistrict
- Location in new Delhi, India
- Coordinates: 28.6380°N 77.2936°E
- Country: India
- State: Delhi
- District: East Delhi

Government
  - Body: Municipal Corporation Of Delhi

Languages
  - Official: Hindi; English
  - Additional official: Punjabi; Urdu
- Time zone: UTC+5:30 (IST)
- PIN: 110092
- Telephone code: 91-11-2201xxxx
- Nearest city: Ghaziabad
- Lok Sabha constituency: East Delhi
- Member of Lok Sabha: Harsh Malhotra
- Vidhan Sabha constituency: 59-Vishwas Nagar
- Member of Legislative Assembly: Om Prakash Sharma
- Civic agency: EDMC
- Municipal Ward: 204 Preet Vihar, Mr. Ramesh Garg

Preet Vihar is a posh residential colony and one of the 3 administrative subdivision of the East Delhi district in India.
