= Daurli metro station =

Metro station in Uttar Pradesh, India

Daurli
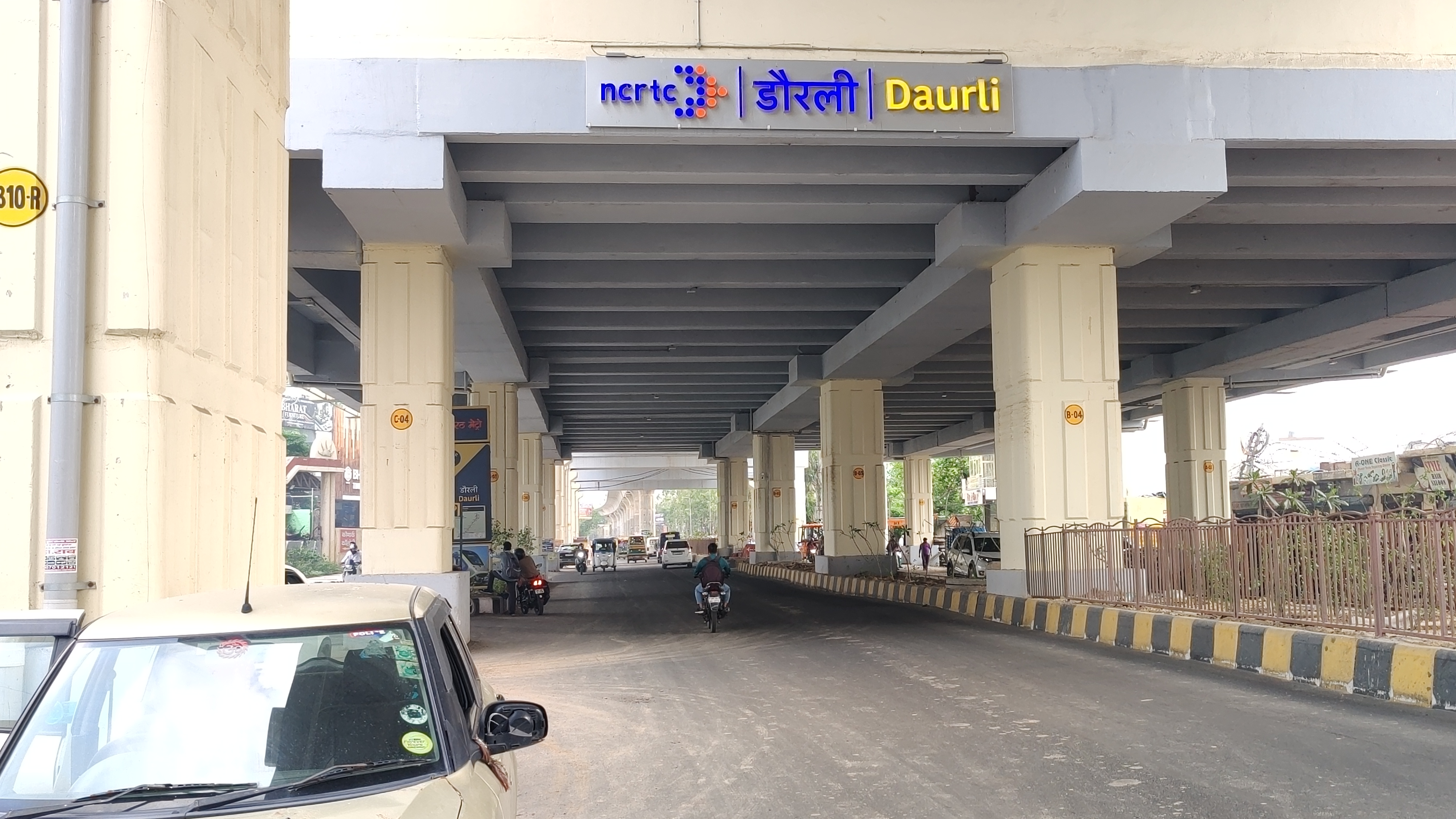
- Daurli metro station

General information
- Location: Daurli, Meerut, Uttar Pradesh, India
- Coordinates: 29.04084°N 77.70698°E
- Owner: NCRTC
- Operator: NCRTC
- Lines: Delhi–Meerut RRTS; MRTS Line MRTS
- Platforms: 2 side platforms (Note: Structurally island. See design and structure.); Platform-1 → Modipuram; Platform-2 → Meerut South
- Tracks: 4

Construction
- Structure type: Elevated
- Platform levels: 2
- Parking: Yes
- Accessible: Yes

Other information
- Status: Operational

History
- Opened: 22 February 2026; 8 months ago
- Electrified: 25 kV 50 Hz AC through overhead catenary

Services
Preceding station	Meerut Metro	Following station
MES Colony towards Meerut South	MRTS Line	Meerut North towards Modipuram Depot
Route map
Location

The Daurli metro station is an elevated Meerut Metro station on the Delhi–Ghaziabad–Meerut RRTS corridor (also known as the Namo Bharat corridor) serving Daurli in Meerut, Uttar Pradesh, India. It serves as a halt for Meerut Metro trains that run at a speed of 120 km/h. The RRTS trains, which do not stop here, pass through the station at a speed of 160 km/h. The station is constructed, owned and operated by the National Capital Region Transport Corporation (NCRTC). The station was inaugurated on 22 February 2026.

== History ==
The station is part of the 23 km-long Meerut Metro segment within the Delhi–Meerut RRTS corridor. Construction works began in 2020 under the supervision of the National Capital Region Transport Corporation (NCRTC). All major civil works and finishing works, including electrical and platform installations, were completed by January 2026, paving the way for the station's inauguration with the entire RRTS and metro corridors on 22 February 2026.

== Location ==
The station is located on NH-334B, which runs from Meerut to Roorkee in Uttarakhand, just south of a fuel station of IndianOil and an outlet mall, and is surrounded by densely populated areas. Thanks to its location, the station provides direct access to local transport routes, commercial and residential zones.

== Design and structure ==
The station is designed as an elevated structure with two island platforms and four tracks. The platforms have metro tracks on one side and RRTS tracks on the other. Only one side of the platform (facing the metro tracks) is accessible to passengers, with doors opening onto the metro trains. The other side of the platform (facing the RRTS tracks) is inaccessible to passengers, as RRTS trains pass through without stopping at these stations, thus technically making the platforms side platforms. This design has optimized land use and reduced construction costs, while also leaving space for future expansion or modifications.

=== Facilities ===
- Four lifts and six escalators
- Passenger waiting areas
- Ticket vending machines and smartcard facilities
- CCTV surveillance and security systems
- Platform screen doors (PSDs)
- Dedicated facilities for physically challenged passengers
- Parking and drop-off zones for last-mile connectivity

== Connectivity ==
Apart from serving the metro, the station has made multiple transport options accessible for ease of travel, including local modes like autorickshaws, buses and cabs. These plus points have improved accessibility and have cut down travel time from Daurli to Meerut South, directly to Delhi through the RRTS, to the Meerut city centre, and to Modipuram in the city's north.

== Station layout ==
G
Street level
Exit/Entrance
L1
Mezzanine/Concourse
Fare control, Station agent, Facilities, Retail stores, Token and ticket vending machines, Crossover

L2
Side platform | Doors will open on the right
Platform 1
Northbound
Towards

AS3 Modipuram Depot metro station
Next Station:
Meerut North

Platform 2
Southbound
Towards

Meerut South RRTS station
Next Station:
MES Colony

Side platform | Doors will open on the right
L2

== Future ==
In view of rise in traffic due to growth in population, Meerut's city expansion and heightened demand for Delhi, Daurli, along with all 13 stations of the metro, have sufficient spaces to expand into RRTS stations to allow both the metro and RRTS trains to halt for handling passengers. This expansion will make the metro stations aligned with the RRTS services, thus enhancing connectivity between Delhi and Meerut even further in the next 10-20 years.

== See also ==
- Meerut Metro
- Delhi–Meerut Regional Rapid Transit System
- RapidX
- National Capital Region Transport Corporation
