= Bhaisali metro station =

Metro station in Meerut, Uttar Pradesh, India

Bhaisali

General information
- Location: Thapar Nagar, Meerut, Uttar Pradesh, India
- Coordinates: 28.97145°N 77.68982°E
- Owner: NCRTC
- Operator: NCRTC
- Lines: Delhi–Meerut RRTS; MRTS Line MRTS
- Platforms: Island platform Platform-1 → Modipuram; Platform-2 → Meerut South
- Tracks: 2

Construction
- Structure type: Underground, double-track
- Platform levels: 2
- Parking: Yes
- Accessible: Yes

Other information
- Status: Operational

History
- Opened: 22 February 2026; 8 months ago
- Electrified: 25 kV 50 Hz AC through overhead catenary

Services
1
Preceding station	Meerut Metro	Following station
Meerut Central towards Meerut South	MRTS Line	Begumpul towards Modipuram Depot
Route map
Location

The Bhaisali metro station is an underground Meerut Metro station on the Delhi–Meerut RRTS corridor (also known as the Namo Bharat corridor) serving Bhaisali in the central area of Meerut in Uttar Pradesh, India. It serves as a halt for Meerut Metro trains that run at a speed of 120 km/h. The RRTS trains, which do not stop here, pass through the station at a speed of 160 km/h. The station is constructed, owned and operated by the National Capital Region Transport Corporation (NCRTC). The station was inaugurated on 22 February 2026.

== History ==
The station is part of the 23-km-long Meerut Metro segment within the Delhi–Meerut RRTS corridor. Construction works began in 2020 under the supervision of the National Capital Region Transport Corporation (NCRTC). All major civil works and finishing works, including electrical and platform installations, were completed by January 2026, paving the way for the station's inauguration with the entire RRTS and metro corridors on 22 February 2026.

== Location ==
The station is located under the old Delhi road in Bhaisali in the historic centre of Meerut, just northeast of Ashok Stambh–a park honouring the fighters of the 1857 Revolt, south of Meerut bus station, and about 5 km (3.1 mi) east of Meerut Cantonment. Thanks to its strategic location, the metro station provides direct access to major landmarks, transport routes, commercial and residential zones.

== Design and structure ==
The station is designed as an underground structure with a single island platform and two tracks on either side of the platform for metro trains—the only service stopping at this station—and RRTS trains passing through. On top of the platform level is the concourse level–which in turn has the entrance building and a parking area on top of it. This design has optimized land use and reduced construction costs, while also leaving space for future expansion or modifications.

=== Facilities ===
- Two lifts and four escalators
- Passenger waiting areas
- Ticket vending machines and smartcard facilities
- CCTV surveillance and security systems
- Platform screen doors (PSDs)
- Dedicated facilities for physically challenged passengers
- Parking and drop-off zones for last-mile connectivity

== Connectivity ==
Apart from serving the metro, the station has made multiple transport options accessible for ease of travel, including local modes like autorickshaws, cabs and buses in the adjoining Meerut bus station. These plus points have improved accessibility and have cut down travel time from the city centre to Meerut South, directly to Delhi through the RRTS, to all major cities in Uttar Pradesh and its neighbouring states, like Muzaffarnagar, Saharanpur, Dehradun, Panipat, Haridwar, Rishikesh, Agra and others through buses, and to Modipuram in Meerut's north.

== Station layout ==
G
Street level
Exit/Entrance
L1
Mezzanine/Concourse
Fare control, Station agent, Facilities, Retail stores, Token and ticket vending machines, Crossover

L2
Island platform | Doors will open on the right
Platform 1
Northbound
Towards

AS3 Modipuram Depot metro station
Next Station:
Begumpul

Platform 2
Southbound
Towards

Meerut South RRTS station
Next Station:
Meerut Central

Island platform | Doors will open on the right
L2

== Future ==
In view of rise in traffic due to growth in population, Meerut's city expansion and heightened demand for Delhi, Bhaisali, along with all 13 stations of the metro, have sufficient spaces to expand into RRTS stations to allow both the metro and RRTS trains to halt for handling passengers. This expansion will make the metro stations aligned with the RRTS services, thus enhancing connectivity between Delhi and Meerut even further in the next 10-20 years.

== See also ==
- Meerut Metro
- Delhi–Meerut Regional Rapid Transit System
- RapidX
- National Capital Region Transport Corporation
