= Begumpul RRTS station =

RapidX's Delhi–Meerut RRTS station

Begumpul
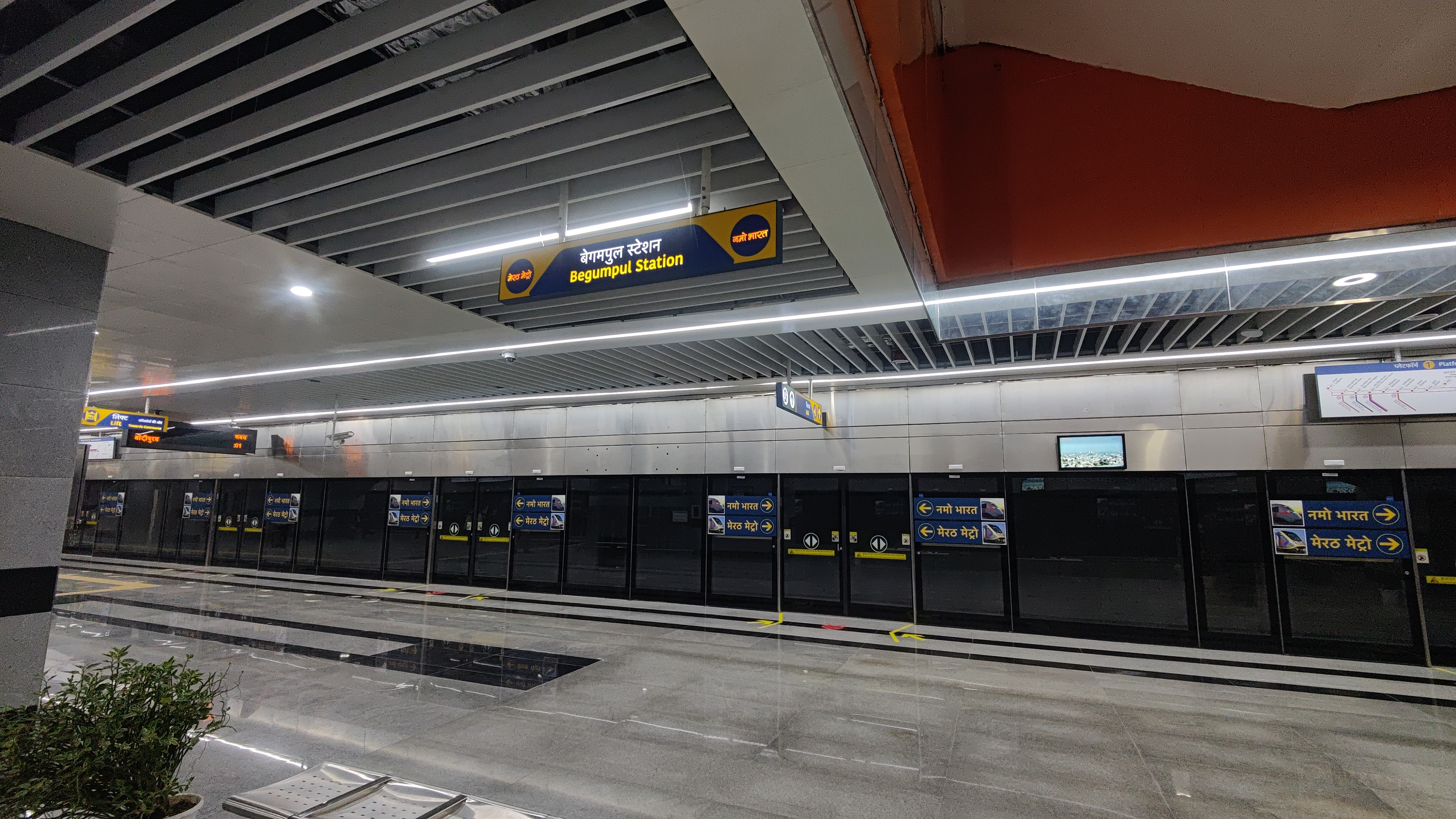
- Begumpul RRTS station

General information
- Location: Begum Pul, Meerut, Uttar Pradesh; India
- Coordinates: 28.99672°N 77.70571°E
- System: Namo Bharat RRTS station
- Owner: NCRTC
- Operator: NCRTC
- Lines: Delhi–Meerut RRTS; MRTS Line MRTS
- Platforms: Island platform Platform-1 → Modipuram; Platform-2 → Sarai Kale Khan
- Tracks: 4

Construction
- Structure type: Underground, Double track
- Platform levels: 2
- Parking: (TBC)
- Accessible: Yes (TBC)

Other information
- Status: Operational

History
- Opened: 22 February 2026; 6 months ago
- Electrified: 25 kV 50 Hz AC through overhead catenary (TBC)

Services
Preceding station	Namo Bharat	Following station
Shatabdi Nagar towards Sarai Kale Khan	Delhi–Meerut	Modipuram Terminus
Preceding station	Meerut Metro	Following station
Bhaisali towards Meerut South	MRTS Line	MES Colony towards Modipuram Depot
Route map
Location

Begumpul RRTS station is an underground Delhi–Meerut Regional Rapid Transit System and Meerut Metro station in Meerut, Uttar Pradesh, India which serves as an underground station for higher-speed trains on the Delhi–Meerut Regional Rapid Transit System that can reach speeds of up to 180 km/h.

The station is operational since 22 February 2026.

== History ==
The National Capital Region Transport Corporation (NCRTC) had invited tenders for the construction of the Begumpul RRTS station along with the Brahmapuri Down Ramp–Begumpul Up Ramp section of the 82.15 km Delhi-Meerut RRTS line. Afcons Infrastructure emerged as the lowest bidder for construction work. Under the agreement, companies started construction of Meerut South RRTS station.
