= Shatabdi Nagar RRTS station =

RapidX's Delhi–Meerut RRTS station

Shatabdi Nagar

General information
- Location: Shatabdi Nagar, Sector 5, MDA, Meerut, Uttar Pradesh 250002; India
- Coordinates: 28.94761°N 77.67359°E
- System: Namo Bharat RRTS station
- Owner: NCRTC
- Operator: NCRTC
- Lines: Delhi–Meerut RRTS; MRTS Line MRTS
- Platforms: Island platform Platform-1 → Modipuram; Platform-2 → Sarai Kale Khan
- Tracks: 4

Construction
- Structure type: Elevated, Double track
- Platform levels: 2
- Parking: (TBC)
- Accessible: Yes (TBC)

Other information
- Status: Operational

History
- Opened: 22 February 2026; 6 months ago
- Electrified: 25 kV 50 Hz AC through overhead catenary (TBC)

Services
Preceding station	Namo Bharat	Following station
Meerut South towards Sarai Kale Khan	Delhi–Meerut	Begumpul towards Modipuram
Preceding station	Meerut Metro	Following station
Rithani towards Meerut South	MRTS Line	Brahmapuri towards Modipuram Depot
Route map
Location

Shatabdi Nagar RRTS station is an elevated Delhi–Meerut Regional Rapid Transit System and Meerut Metro station in Meerut district, Uttar Pradesh, India which serves as an elevated station for higher-speed trains on the Delhi–Meerut Regional Rapid Transit System that can reach speeds of up to 180 km/h. The station will be powered by solar energy, with 1,100 solar panels on the station's roof.

Shatabdi Nagar RRTS station is inaugurated on 22 February 2026.

== Station layout ==
The Shatabdi Nagar RRTS station have 2 elevated station platforms, with the station building located underneath the platform level. The RRTS station will have 2 island platforms, which will serve 2 rail tracks for Meerut Metro services and 2 rail tracks for RapidX services.

It has three levels – platform, concourse and street level. Shatabdi Nagar RRTS station is 215 meters long and 26 meters wide. The rail tracks will be constructed at a height of 24 meters above the ground level.

G	Street Level	Exit/Entrance
L1	Mezzanine	Fare control, station agent, Metro Card vending machines, crossover
L2	Platform 1 Meerut Metro	Towards → AS3 Modipuram Depot; Next Station: Brahmapuri
L2	Island platform | P1 Doors will open on the right | P2 Doors will open on the left
L2	Platform 2 RRTS Line	Towards → Modipuram; Next Station: Begumpul
L2	Platform 3 RRTS Line	Towards ← Sarai Kale Khan; Next Station: Meerut South
L2	FOB, Island platform | P3 Doors will open on the left | P4 Doors will open on the right
L2	Platform 4 Meerut Metro	Towards ← Meerut South; Next Station: Rithani
L2
