= Modinagar North RRTS station =

RapidX Delhi–Meerut RRTS station

Modinagar North

General information
- Location: GT Road, near ICICI Bank Branch, Modinagar, Uttar Pradesh 201204; India
- Coordinates: 28.84373°N 77.58345°E
- System: Namo Bharat RRTS station
- Owner: NCRTC
- Operator: NCRTC
- Line: Delhi–Meerut RRTS
- Platforms: Side platform Platform-1 → Modipuram; Platform-2 → Sarai Kale Khan
- Tracks: 2

Construction
- Structure type: Elevated, Double track
- Platform levels: 2
- Parking: Four-Wheeler Parking
- Accessible: Yes

Other information
- Status: Operational

History
- Opened: 07 March 2024; 2 years ago
- Electrified: 25 kV 50 Hz AC through overhead catenary

Services
Preceding station	Namo Bharat	Following station
Modinagar South towards Sarai Kale Khan	Delhi–Meerut	Meerut South towards Modipuram
Route map
Location

Modinagar North RRTS station is an elevated RRTS station in the Modinagar town of Ghaziabad district in Uttar Pradesh, India. This serves as a RRTS station for higher-speed trains on the Delhi–Meerut Regional Rapid Transit System that can reach speeds of up to 180 km/h.

After the trial run of Duhai - Meerut South RRTS stretch was commissioned successfully, this RRTS station was inaugurated by Prime Minister Narendra Modi on March 6, 2024 via video conferencing from Kolkata, and began its operations along with the existing 17-km Sahibabad-Duhai stretch of the Delhi–Meerut RRTS from March 7, 2024.

== History ==
The National Capital Region Transport Corporation (NCRTC) had invited tenders for the construction of the Modinagar North RRTS station along with the 21.5 km long Murad Nagar–Meerut South section of the 82.15 km Delhi-Meerut RRTS line. L&T Heavy Civil Infrastructure emerged as the lowest bidder for construction work. Under the agreement, companies started construction of Modinagar North RRTS station.

== Station layout ==
The Modinagar North RRTS station has three levels - platform, concourse and street level. Modinagar North RRTS station will be 215 meters long and 26 meters wide. The rail tracks will be constructed at a height of 24 meters above the ground level.

G	Street level	Exit/Entrance
L1	Mezzanine	Fare control, Station agent, Token vending machines, Crossover
L2	Side platform | Doors will open on the left
L2	Platform 1 Eastbound	Towards → Modipuram; Next Station: Meerut South
L2	Platform 2 Westbound	Towards ← Sarai Kale Khan; Next Station: Modinagar South
L2	Side platform | Doors will open on the left
L2

There are 2 Gate points – 1 and 2. Commuters can use either of the points for their travel:-

- Gate 1 - Towards Meerut Side
- Gate 2 - Towards Delhi Side
