= Meerut Metro =

Rapid transit system in India

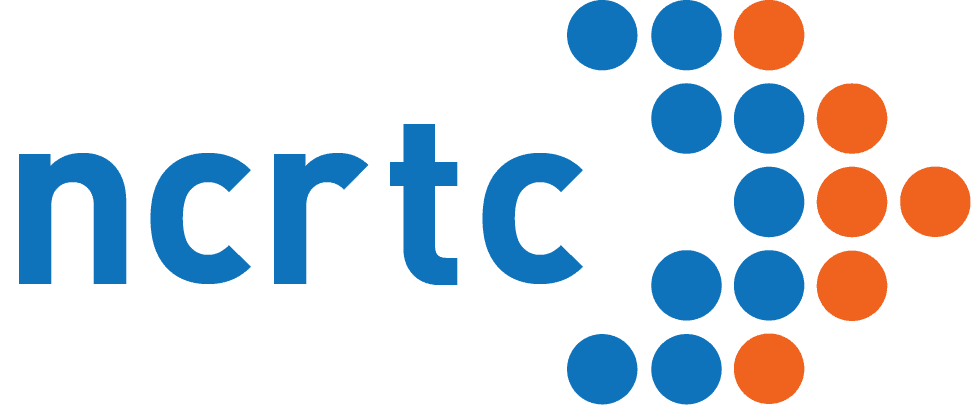

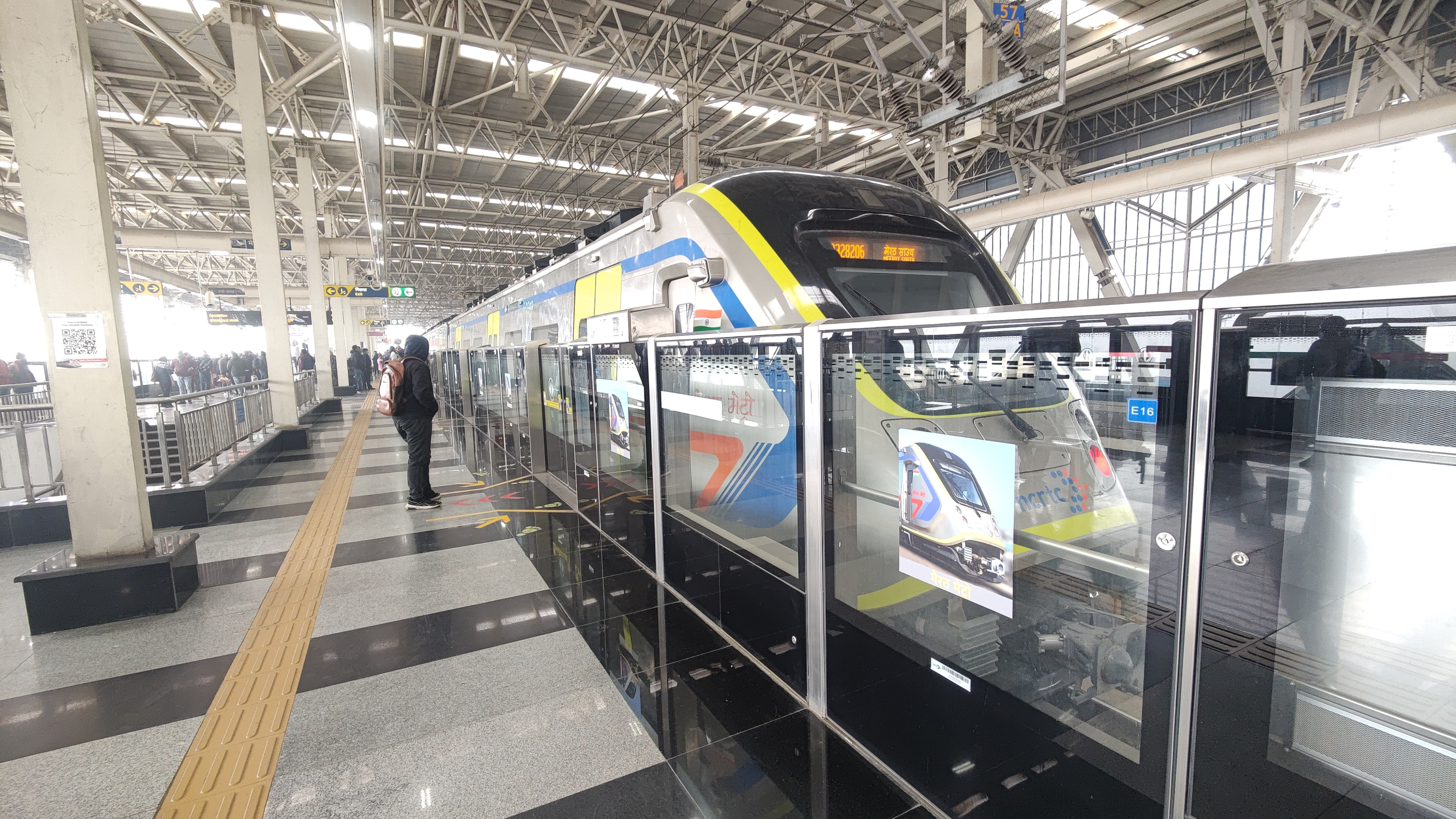
- A trainset at Meerut South

Overview
- Owner: National Capital Region Transport Corporation (NCRTC)
- Locale: Meerut, Uttar Pradesh
- Transit type: Rapid transit
- Number of lines: 1 (Phase-I)
- Number of stations: 12 (1 under construction)

Operation
- Began operation: 22 February 2026; 8 months ago
- Operator: National Capital Region Transport Corporation (NCRTC)
- Character: Elevated, underground and at-grade
- Train length: 3 coaches

Technical
- System length: 23.6 km (14.7 mi)
- Track gauge: 1,435 mm (4 ft 8 1/2 in) standard gauge
- Electrification: 25 kV 50 Hz AC overhead catenary
- Average speed: 80 km/h
- Top speed: 120 km/h

The Meerut Metro is a rapid transit system, which serves the city of Meerut, Uttar Pradesh, India. The first phase, covering 23.6 km (14.7 mi) with 12 stations from Modipuram to Meerut South, opened in February 2026. It has nine elevated and three underground stations, one at-grade station at the depot Modipuram is still under construction. Four stations are integrated with the Delhi–Meerut Regional Rapid Transit System on a single corridor, making the metro the first such rapid transit system in India to be merged directly with a regional transit system. It is the second-largest metro network in Uttar Pradesh, following the Noida Metro. The second phase will include a second line covering 15 km (9.3 mi) from Shradhapuri Phase-II to Jagrati Vihar, with 12 stations, out of which seven will be elevated and five will be underground, thereby taking the overall length to 38.6 km (24.0 mi). A possible third line as a third phase has also been put forward for feasibility studies, that will increase the total length by another 9 km (5.6 mi) to 47.6 km (29.6 mi). The metro is the fastest metro of India, at an operational speed of 120 km/h (75 mph).

The foundation stone for the project was laid by Prime Minister Narendra Modi on 8 March 2019, along with the RRTS, and construction began on both the RRTS and the metro projects in June 2019. The 1st phase was opened on 22 February 2026, after missing the deadline of June 2025. It is being built at an estimated cost of ₹11,540 crore (US$1.2 billion), and due to its merger with the RRTS, the metro and its trains will be owned and operated by National Capital Region Transport Corporation (NCRTC).

== History ==
Due to rising population, traffic, congestion and demand in Meerut, and also because of its location in the National Capital Region (NCR), the plan for developing a metro for the city and integrating it with the transport systems of NCR was proposed by the Governments of India and Uttar Pradesh in the early 2010s. Therefore, the feasibility study of the metro project was completed by Rail India Technical and Economic Services (RITES) in June 2015 and submitted to the Government of Uttar Pradesh the next year, in June 2016. In 2017, the Uttar Pradesh Metro Rail Corporation (UPMRC) was assigned to bring all stakeholders together and get the project started, then operate the metro after completion. The line was initially planned to have eleven stations, from Modipuram to Partapur, but was later extended to Meerut South to provide connectivity to the city's outskirts, thereby increasing the number of stations to 13 and the length to 23.6 km (14.7 mi). The initiation of the project was marked after the foundation stone was laid by Prime Minister Narendra Modi on 8 March 2019, along with the Delhi–Meerut Regional Rapid Transit System (RRTS), and construction of both the projects commenced in June of the same year. Both the projects, including the Meerut section of the RRTS, can be extended beyond also. The metro is the first rapid transit system in India being directly integrated and merged with a regional transit system on one single corridor, and also the fastest in India, with an operational speed of 120 km/h (75 mph).

During the clash in the Galwan Valley in 2020, the Swadeshi Jagran Manch urged the Government of India to withdraw the bid from a Chinese company associated with manufacturing the trains of the metro. In view of this, a re-bidding for making the trains was conducted by the owner of the metro and the RRTS projects, the National Capital Region Transport Corporation (NCRTC), and Bombardier Transportation, now acquired by Alstom, won the bid on 7 May 2020. The trains have been manufactured at Alstom's plant in Savli, Gujarat, supplying 90 coaches for 30 trains, each consisting of 3 coaches. The first train of the metro was delivered by Alstom to the NCRTC on 16 February 2024.

After roughly five years of construction, in January 2025, the first trial runs were conducted by the National Capital Region Transport Corporation (NCRTC) from Meerut South, the southern terminal of the metro with the RRTS, to Meerut Central, one of the stations to serve only the metro. The trials continued until the metro becomes operational by February 2026.

== Construction Phases ==
The National Capital Region Transport Corporation (NCRTC) has divided the civil construction work of the first phase of the metro project into 13 stations and one depot at Modipuram, which will be for both the Delhi–Meerut Regional Rapid Transit System (RRTS) and the metro trains, and four packages, which are part of the packages of the RRTS as well. The list of the packages, contractors and their statuses is as follows:

Packages	Description	Phase	Contractors	Status	Ref
Part of Package-3	Partapur – Shatabdi Nagar (elevated viaduct and 3 stations at Partapur, Rithani and Shatabdi Nagar)	1	Larsen & Toubro (L&T)	Completed	
Package-5B	Modipuram Depot and Workshop	1	KSM Bashir Mohammad & Sons	Under construction	
Package-7	Shatabdi Nagar – Brahampuri Down Ramp and Begumpul Up Ramp – Modipuram (elevated viaduct and 5 stations at Brahmapuri, MES Colony, Daurli, Meerut North and Modipuram)	1	Larsen & Toubro (L&T)	Completed	
Package-8	Brahampuri Down Ramp to Begumpul Up Ramp (underground twin tunnels and 3 stations at Meerut Central, Bhaisali and Begumpul)	1	Afcons Infrastructure	Completed	

Operational network
No.	Line name	Terminals		Stations	Length (km)	Opening date
1	Metro Line	Meerut South	Modipuram	12	23.6 km (14.7 mi)	22 February 2026
Total				12	23.6 km (14.7 mi)	

== Corridors ==
The metro is being developed in two phases, which will together cover a distance of 38.6 km (24.0 mi), currently of which the first phase consisting of the first line to run along the RRTS is in use. A possible third phase consisting of an east–west line has also been planned, that will increase the total length of the network by another 9 km (5.6 mi) to 47.6 km (29.6 mi) once finalised. The details of the lines are as follows:

=== Phase I ===
- Line 1: Meerut South to Modipuram, 23.6 km (14.7 mi)–elevated 14.8 km (9.2 mi), underground 8.8 km (5.5 mi) and one at-grade station as the depot station at Modipuram. The line will have 13 stations, of which nine will be elevated, three underground and one at-grade station at Modipuram depot. It will run parallelly along the RRTS on a single corridor.

=== Phase II ===
- Line 2: Shradhapuri Phase II to Jagrati Vihar, 15 km (9.3 mi)–elevated 10.7 km (6.6 mi) and underground 4.3 km (2.7 mi). The line will have 12 stations, of which seven will be elevated and five underground. It is currently waiting for approval for a new Detailed Project Report (DPR) tender to be floated.

=== Phase III ===
- Line 3: CCS University to Begumpul via GangaNagar, 9 km (5.6 mi)–elevated 6 km (3.7 mi) and underground 3 km (1.9 mi). The line will have 6 stations, of which five will be elevated and one underground. It is currently under planning stage.

== Stations ==
The metro, together with two lines, will consist of 25 stations, of which the first line will have 13, and the second line will have 12 stations. Additionally, there will be interchange points with the Delhi–Meerut Regional Rapid Transit System (RRTS) at Meerut South, Shatabdi Nagar, Begumpul, and Modipuram stations. The stations being built on the metro in its first phase are:

Meerut Metro
No.	Station code	Station name		Phase	Opening	Interchange connection(s)	Station layout	Platform level type	Depot connection(s)	Depot layout
No.	Station code	English	Hindi	Phase	Opening	Interchange connection(s)	Station layout	Platform level type	Depot connection(s)	Depot layout
1		Meerut South	मेरठ दक्षिण	1	22 February 2026	Delhi–Meerut	Elevated	Island	TBD	TBD
2		Partapur	परतापुर	1	22 February 2026	None	Elevated	Island	None	None
3		Rithani	रिठानी	1	22 February 2026	None	Elevated	Island	None	None
4		Shatabdi Nagar	शताब्दी नगर	1	22 February 2026	Delhi–Meerut	Elevated	Island	None	None
5		Brahmpuri	ब्रह्मपुरी	1	22 February 2026	None	Elevated	Island	None	None
6		Meerut Central	मेरठ सेंट्रल	1	22 February 2026	None	Underground	Island	None	None
7		Bhaisali	भैसाली	1	22 February 2026	None	Underground	Island	None	None
8		Begumpul	बेगमपुल	1	22 February 2026	Delhi–Meerut	Underground	Island	None	None
9		MES Colony	एमईएस कॉलोनी	1	22 February 2026	None	Elevated	Island	None	None
10		Daurli	डौरली	1	22 February 2026	None	Elevated	Island	None	None
11		Meerut North	मेरठ उत्तर	1	22 February 2026	None	Elevated	Island	None	None
12		Modipuram	मोदीपुरम	1	22 February 2026	Delhi–Meerut	Elevated	Island	None	None
13	AS3	Modipuram Depot	मोदीपुरम डिपो	1	2026	None	At-grade	Side	Modipuram Depot	At-grade

== Rolling stock ==
The trains of the metro are being manufactured and delivered by Alstom, a global French company in railway manufacturing, at its plant in Savli, Vadodara district, Gujarat. In May 2020, the Bombardier Transportation, a former Canadian company in railway manufacturing, now acquired by Alstom since 2021, won a contract from the National Capital Region Transport Corporation (NCRTC) for indigenously making 30 coaches in a configuration of 10 trainsets of three cars each, with a capacity of 700 passengers. The first train was delivered to the NCRTC on 16 February 2024.

== Integration with Delhi–Meerut RRTS ==
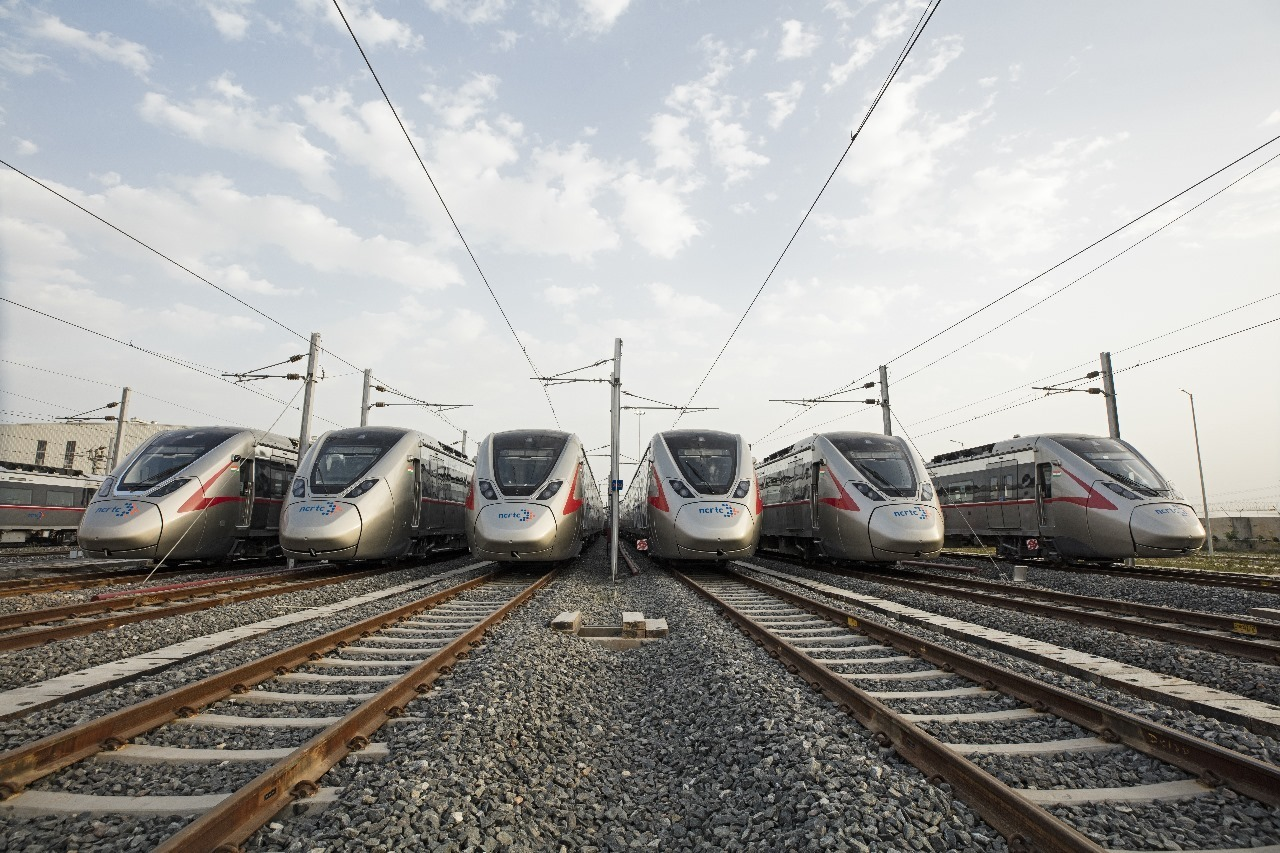
Namo Bharat trainsets of the Delhi–Meerut Regional Rapid Transit System (RRTS) parked at Duhai depot

In the metro's first phase, the first line will run in parallel along the RRTS tracks on both sides, and the four of its 13 stations will be integrated with the RRTS, at Modipuram, Begumpul, Shatabdi Nagar and Meerut South, so that commuters can seamlessly connect with the metro and the Namo Bharat trains of the RRTS, providing them the ease of travel within Meerut and for connectivity to Delhi, Noida, Ghaziabad and adjoining parts of the National Capital Region (NCR). This makes the metro the first metro in India to run along and directly integrate with a regional transit system.

== Signalling and train control system ==
The National Capital Region Transport Corporation (NCRTC) has decided to equip the line with ETCS L3 signalling, one of the most advanced signalling systems used in Europe, as the metro will run on the same corridor as the Delhi–Meerut Regional Rapid Transit System (RRTS). Tenders for its procurement were invited on 17 April 2020, and Alstom was awarded the contract worth approximately ₹937 crore (US$100 million) in January 2021.

Nokia partnered with Alstom to implement the 4.9G/LTE private wireless network to support the ETCS L2 signalling. This is the first time in the world that an LTE network is being used along with ETCS L2 signalling.

== Status updates ==
- Jul 2016: The Detailed Project Report prepared by Rail India Technical and Economic Services (RITES) was submitted to the state government.
- Jun 2017: The project had been put on hold in view of the higher-priority Delhi–Meerut Regional Rapid Transit System (RRTS) project.
- Jan 2018: The state cabinet decided to build metros in Meerut, Kanpur, and Agra.
- Sep 2018: The DPR was sent by the state government to the central government for approval.
- Jan 2019: The Meerut Metro and Delhi–Meerut RRTS were decided to run on the same corridor.
- Mar 2019: Prime Minister Narendra Modi laid the foundation stone for the RRTS and the metro projects.
- Jun 2019: The initiation of the RRTS and metro projects was marked by the beginning of the pillar work by Larsen & Toubro.
- May 2020: Bombardier Transportation, now acquired by Alstom, won the bid for making the train sets of the RRTS and metro projects.
- Feb 2024: The first train of the metro was received by the NCRTC. Both the RRTS and metro projects are on track to be completed by June 2025.
- Jan 2025: The first trials started between Meerut South to Meerut Central section of the metro. The trials will continue until the metro begins operations.
- December 2025: Extensive trials are underway. Of both Namo Bharat and Meerut Metro. Finishing work of underground stations is underway.
- January 2026: Work is underway at Modipuram metro depot and final touches are being given to Modipuram station.
- February 2026: Metro will be opened simultaneously with the remaining stretch of RRTS on 22 February. The metro will be operated from Duhai depot as the work on Modipuram depot is not finished yet.

== Ridership ==
In February 2026, the Namo Bharat RRTS — a high-speed regional rail corridor connecting Delhi, Ghaziabad, and Meerut — recorded significant early ridership following the completion of its full 82 km route. On the first full day of commercial operations after the formal inauguration by India's prime minister, the National Capital Region Transport Corporation reported that passenger numbers surpassed 100,000, marking the highest single-day ridership recorded on the corridor to date.

Following this initial milestone, ridership continued to grow. On the first weekday after the launch of remaining sections, daily usage was reported to have increased by nearly 70% over previous average figures, again exceeding the 100,000 mark. Major stations such as Begumpul in Meerut, Anand Vihar, and Ghaziabad were among the busiest points of entry and exit for commuters.

The early ridership numbers indicate strong public adoption of the service, with the system aimed at offering faster regional connectivity and reducing travel times across key urban centres in the National Capital Region.

Now Meerut Metro is averaging around 92,000 users on daily Basis.

== See also ==
- Delhi–Meerut Regional Rapid Transit System
- Urban rail transit in India
- National Capital Region Transport Corporation
- Uttar Pradesh Metro Rail Corporation
- List of metro cities in India
- Transport in NCR
- Transport in Meerut
- List of metro networks in Uttar Pradesh
