= List of metro networks in Uttar Pradesh =

The History of Metro in Uttar Pradesh starts with Lucknow Metro when It began its commercial operation on 5 September 2017.Currently there are 6 cities in Uttar Pradesh with available metro network including Ghaziabad which is connected with Delhi metro's Red line and Blue Line.

There are 4 Authorities responsible to run 6 Metro networks

- UPMRC for Lucknow Metro, Kanpur Metro, Agra Metro
- NMRC for Noida Metro
- DMRC for Metro lines in Ghaziabad
- NCRTC for Meerut Metro

== Metro Network summaries ==
- Lucknow Metro: Operational since 2017, Lucknow Metro is first metro network in UP.
- Kanpur Metro: Launched recently, Kanpur Metro is the one of the fastest build and network in the country.
- Meerut Metro: Operated by NCRTC, Meerut Metro is part of a broader regional transit plan integrated with Delhi Metro and Delhi-Meerut RRTS, allowing riders to buy direct tickets to any Delhi Metro station via the Namo Bharat App. Its the fastest metro in the country
- Noida Metro: The Largest metro network in UP also called Aqua Line connects Noida and Greater Noida, and its integration with Delhi Metro facilitates convenient commuter interchange.

Sr.No.	City	Metro Name	Operated by	Connected with	Integrated with	System Length (km)
1	Lucknow	Lucknow Metro	Uttar Pradesh Metro Rail Corporation (UPMRC)	Connected with Indian Railways but not integrated	NA	22.87
2	Kanpur	Kanpur Metro	Uttar Pradesh Metro Rail Corporation (UPMRC)	Connected with Indian Railways but not integrated	NA	16.0
3	Noida / Greater Noida	Noida Metro	Noida Metro Rail Corporation (NMRC)	Connected with DMRC Blue line via Sky Bridge	None	29.7
4	Agra	Agra Metro	Uttar Pradesh Metro Rail Corporation (UPMRC)	Planned connectivity with Indian Railways and ISBT	None	6
5	Meerut	Meerut Metro	National Capital Region Transport Corporation (NCRTC)	Delhi Metro Pink Line, Blue Line, Red line	Delhi Metro, Delhi-Meerut RRTS (Riders can buy direct tickets to any Delhi Metro station from Namo Bharat App)	23.6

== See also ==
- Metro systems in India
- List of metro systems
