= Delhi–Meerut Expressway =

Controlled-access expressway in India

Delhi–Meerut Expressway

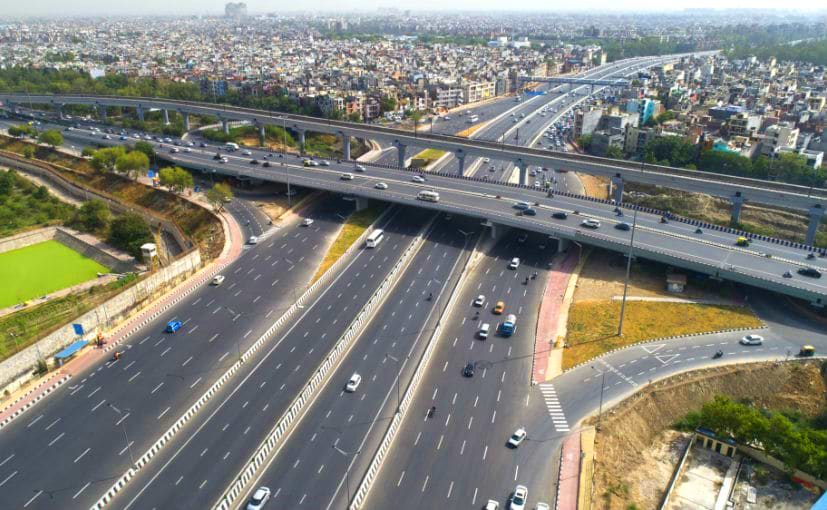

Route information
- Length: 96 km (60 mi)
- Existed: 1 April 2021–present

Major junctions
- From: NH 44 in New Delhi
- List: NH 709B in Akshardham, New Delhi; NH 9 / NH 34 / NH 334C in Ghaziabad, Uttar Pradesh; NE 2 in Kallu Garhi, Uttar Pradesh
- To: NH 34 / NH 334 in Partapur, Uttar Pradesh

Section 1: Nizamuddin Bridge–Delhi/UP Border
- Length: 8.7 km (5.4 mi)
- South end: Nizamuddin Bridge, New Delhi
- North end: Delhi-Uttar Pradesh Border

Section 2: Delhi/UP Border–Dasna
- Length: 19.2 km (11.9 mi)
- South end: Delhi-Uttar Pradesh Border
- North end: Dasna

Section 3: Dasna–Hapur
- Length: 22.2 km (13.8 mi)
- South end: Dasna
- North end: Hapur

Section 4: Dasna–Meerut
- Length: 46 km (29 mi)
- South end: Dasna
- North end: Partapur

Location
- Country: India
- States: National Capital Territory, Uttar Pradesh

Highway system
- Roads in India; Expressways; National; State; Asian

Delhi–Meerut Expressway or National Expressway 3 is a 96 km (60 mi) long controlled-access expressway, connecting Delhi and Meerut in India. The total project cost was estimated to be ₹80 billion (US$830 million). The highway starts from Nizamuddin Bridge in the National Capital Territory and extends 28 km (17 mi) to Dasna in Uttar Pradesh. Part of the old National Highway 9, this section of the road has been widened to accommodate 14 lanes of traffic. The expressway then traverses 46 km (29 mi) from Dasna to Partapur near Meerut. A spur of the highway extends for 22 km (14 mi) between Dasna and Hapur.

== History ==
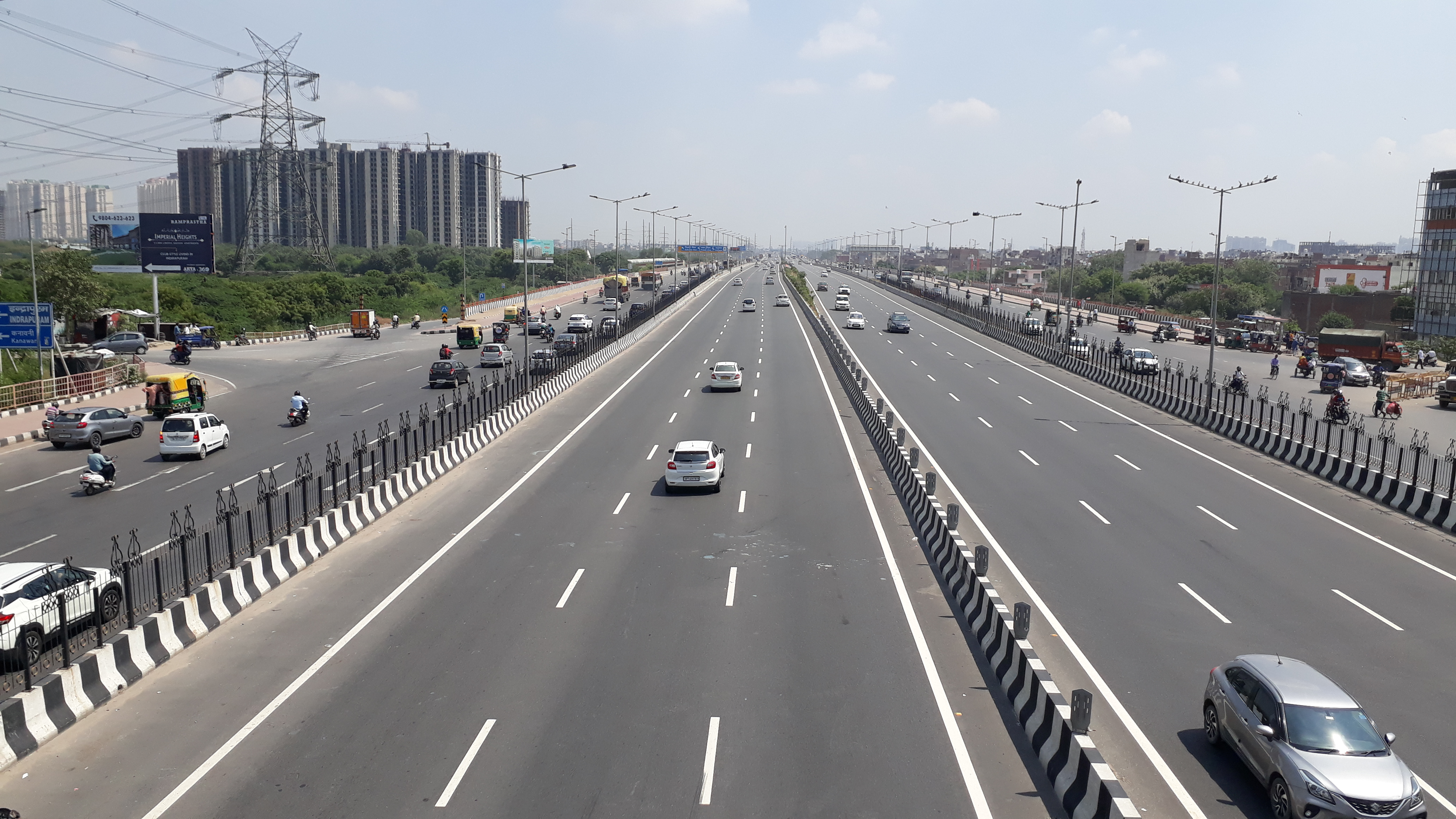
Delhi-Meerut Expressway near Ghaziabad

A proposal for a Ghaziabad to Meerut expressway was mentioned in the Lok Sabha by the then Minister of State for Urban Affairs and Employment in March 1999. The proposal again found mention in a February 2000 seminar speech by the then Union Urban Development Minister.

An expressway from Delhi to Meerut via Ghaziabad was then proposed under the NCR Transport Plan 2021, which was notified in September 2005. The Delhi to Ghaziabad section was to be taken up in 2001–11 with the Ghaziabad to Meerut scheduled 2011–21. In February 2006, the committee on infrastructure gave approval for a feasibility study for the expressway. The decision to build the expressway was announced in the 2006 budget speech by then Finance Minister P. Chidambaram. Construction of 1,000 km of expressways under National Highway Development Program (NHDP) Phase-VI was approved in November 2006. In December 2006, it was reported that 600 km of expressways would be chosen from among the proposed expressways including the Delhi-Meerut expressway for the first stage of NHDP Phase-VI on the basis of a prioritization study being taken up by the NHAI.

In April 2008, it was reported that proposals had been invited from consultants for deciding the alignment of the expressway. In November 2009, it was reported that the alignment study had been completed and a consultant had been appointed for the feasibility study for the project, with the expected completion of the study by May 2010. In August 2011, it was reported that the expressway was targeted for completion by December 2015. In October 2011, it was reported that the feasibility report was under progress and the project was to be taken up under NHDP Phase-VI. The alignment proposed was to be along NH-24 from Nizammuddin to Dasna and then to Meerut. In December 2011, the December 2015 targeted completion date was reaffirmed and the feasibility report submitted by the appointed consultant was said to be under study.

In May 2012, it was reported that the original target of awarding concession by 2009–10 was not completed due to various problems regarding alignment finalisation, and the consequent delay in feasibility reports. In July 2013, the Steering Group appointed by the Prime Minister to accelerate Infrastructure Investment decided on 15 March 2014 as the last date for awarding of contract for the expressway.

In August 2013, it was reported that the expressway was targeted for the contemporary financial year. In November 2013, it was reported that the stretch from Delhi up to UP Gate was to be converted from six lanes to fourteen lanes with six lanes grade-separated exclusively for traffic moving towards Meerut. The stretch from UP Gate to Dasna was to be eight laned and a new six lane alignment was to come up from Dasna to Meerut bypass on National Highway – 58. The project cost, including land acquisition, was estimated at ₹6,450 crore (US$670 million).

On 18 November 2013, it was confirmed that Centre, not the Uttar Pradesh State Government, would build the much delayed Delhi–Meerut Expressway starting from Nizamuddin Bridge on Ring Road. Once complete, commuters will be able to reach Meerut in 45 to 60 minutes and cut travel time to Haridwar and Dehradun by almost an hour.

The Cabinet Committee on Economic Affairs (CCEA) under the government of India Chaired by Prime Minister Narendra Modi approved the Delhi–Meerut Expressway (4 laning) with construction of connected roads to be undertaken in July 2014. CCEA under PM Modi again approved the widening of these roads 8/6 laning in May 2016. There will be six- to eight-laning of NH 24 (Hapur bypass), six laning of NH 58 (Delhi-UP border), six-laning of NH 235 (Delhi-UP). The total cost is about ₹7,855.87 crore (US$820 million). The deadline set for the project is three years.

Construction of the Nizamuddin to Dasna road began on 31 December 2015.

== Project ==
National Highway Authority of India (NHAI) divided the 96 km stretch starting from Nizamuddin bridge in the outer ring road in New Delhi to Meerut bypass into four packages:

=== Package I: Nizamuddin Bridge to Delhi-UP border ===
This section is 8.7 km long, 14 Lane (6 Lane Expressway, 8 Lane Normal Highway, 2.5 m Bicycle Track on Both Side) with 4 flyovers and 3 vehicle underpass. The project involved development of expressway from Nizamuddin Bridge (km-0.000) to existing Delhi-Uttar Pradesh Border (km-8.360) section of NH-24

Development of Package I of Delhi–Meerut Expressway in length of 8.7 km in Delhi was awarded to concessionaire Welspun Delhi Meerut Expressway Private Limited. Total project cost was estimated to be ₹841.50 crore (US$87 million). This phase of the expressway was inaugurated on 27 May 2018 by Prime Minister Narendra Modi.

=== Package II: Delhi-UP Border to Dasna ===
This section is 19.2 km long, 14 lane (6 lane expressway, 8 lane normal highway, 2.5 m bicycle track on both sides) with 13 vehicle underpasses and 6 foot-underpasses.

Tender for this section was awarded to Apco Chetak JV (A JV between Apco Infratech Ltd and Chetak Enterprises Ltd), at a cost of ₹1,998 crore (US$210 million) (cost of shifting of transmission lines: ₹225 crore (US$23 million), cost of shifting water pipeline: ₹160 crore (US$17 million), 22,027 trees was estimated to be cut and ₹22 crore (US$2.3 million) compensation given to district forest department) The work was carried out under National Highways Development Project (NHDP): Phase-VI.

A total nine underpasses and three flyovers are planned on the 20 km stretch to Dasna. But following a revision in the detailed project report, the plan was amended to 15 underpasses and a just one flyover, at Lal Kuan. The underpasses has been built in such a way that there is no crisscrossing traffic on the expressway and traffic flow at intersections will be altered accordingly. This section was completed on 1 April 2021 and opened for public.

=== Package III: Dasna to Hapur ===
This section is 22.2 km long, 8 lane normal expressway, from existing km 27.500 to existing km 49.923 of NH 24. 1 flyover and 12 underpass will be constructed on this segment. Previously it was 6 lane but in Sep–Oct 2016 board meeting it was updated to 8 lanes.

Contract for this section was awarded to Apco-Chetak JV, at a cost of ₹1,081 crore (US$110 million). This section was formally inaugurated on 30 September 2019 by Nitin Gadkari, Union Minister of MoRTH

=== Package IV: Dasna to Meerut ===
46 km long, 6 lane expressway is a new greenfield alignment. The alignment stretched from Dasna in Ghaziabad district to Meerut Bypass at Partapur. Earlier, the 45-km-long Ghaziabad to Meerut section of NH-58 was also part of project but due to the decision of Rapid Rail Transit System (RRTS) to use dividers on NH-58 for trains' elevated corridor, the highway was not used and new alignment was proposed.

The tender for the above alignment was awarded to GR Infraprojects for a contract value of ₹1,087.07 crores. This section was completed on 1 April 2021 and opened for public.

== Funding ==
Of the total project cost, 40% was funded by the National Highways Authority of India (NHAI) under the new 'Hybrid Annuity Model'. The remaining 60% was arranged by the concessionaire by way of mix of debt/equity of 48:12, 12% being the promoter's contribution and rest will be funded by Punjab National Bank-led consortium.

== Historical Timeline ==
- Prime Minister Narendra Modi laid the foundation stone for the expressway on 30 December 2015.

=== Section 1: Nizamuddin Bridge to Delhi-UP Border ===
- Mar 2017: 15% work completed.
- Aug 2017: 60% work completed.
- Nov 2017: 75% work completed.
- Apr 2018: 100% work completed
- 27 May 2018: Inaugurated by the Prime Minister of India, Narendra Modi.

=== Section 2: Delhi-UP Border to Dasna ===
- Mar 2017: Contract is yet to be awarded to developer.
- Aug 2017: Apco-Chetak (joint venture between Apco Infra from Uttar Pradesh and Chetak from Rajasthan) the developer for this section is not able to complete financial closure for this section i.e. not able to get it financed by banks.
- Nov 2017: Work has finally started on this section. Leveling work has started and separator boards have been enacted for proposed flyover at Lal Kuan by Apco Infra.
- May 2018: 15% work completed.
- Oct 2018: 24% work completed.
- Jan 2019: 35% work completed.
- Feb 2019: UP border to Dasna will be completed By December 2019 i.e. before the official deadline of May 2020.
- Apr 2019: 46% work completed on UP-Border – Vijaynagar stretch of 8 km.
- July 2019: 53% work completed on UP-Border – Vijaynagar stretch of 8 km. To be inaugurated by December 2019.
- Aug 2019: 53% work completed on UP-Border – portion from UP Gate to Pratap Vihar will be opened by October 2019. Full stretch to be inaugurated by December 2019, however, rail over-bridge at LalKuan will be completed by May 2020.
- Feb 2020: 70% work completed.
- Aug 2020: 85% work completed.
- Apr 2021: Completed on 1 April 2021 and opened for public.

=== Section 3: Dasna to Hapur ===
- Mar 2017: Work started.
- Aug 2017: 15% work completed.
- May 2018: 60% work completed.
- Jan 2019: 85% work completed.
- July 2019: 95% work completed. 5 km-long Pilkhuwa elevated road opened.
- 10 Aug 2019: 97% work completed. Masuri bridge opened.
- 19 Aug 2019: 97% work completed.
- 2 Sep 2019: Dasna to Hapur section opened for traffic.
- 30 Sep 2019: Section formally inaugurated by Nitin Gadkari, Union Minister of MoRTH

=== Section 4: Dasna to Meerut ===
- May 2018: 3% work completed.
- Dec 2018: 25% work completed
- July 2019: 51% work completed
- Sep 2019: The stretch to get delayed as no work has started on 4 km of track due to land not handed over to authority because of on going land scam enquiry.
- Dec 2019: The Ghaziabad District Administration handed over 71 hectares of land to NHAI for construction of Meerut Expressway, clearing the land hurdle.
- Feb 2020: 60% work completed.
- Aug 2020: 75% work completed.
- Apr 2021: Completed on 1 April 2021 and opened for public.

== Green initiatives ==
The National Highways Authority of India (NHAI) utilised the solid waste from Ghazipur landfill in construction of Delhi–Meerut Expressway to curb pollution.

== See also ==
- Eastern Peripheral Expressway (KGP Expressway)
- Western Peripheral Expressway (KMP Expressway)
- National Highway 9 (Old NH-24)
- National Highway 34 (Old NH-58)
- Delhi–Meerut RRTS
- Delhi Noida Direct Flyway (DND Flyway)
