= Dasna =

- Town
- Location in Uttar Pradesh, India Dasna (India)
- Coordinates: 28.68°N 77.53°E
- Country: India
- State: Uttar Pradesh
- District: Ghaziabad
- Elevation: 207 m (679 ft)

Population (2011)
  - Total: 34,914

Languages
  - Official: Hindi
- Time zone: UTC+5:30 (IST)
- Vehicle registration: UP-14
- Website: up.gov.in

Dasna is a town, near Ghaziabad city and a nagar panchayat in Ghaziabad district in the state of Uttar Pradesh, India.

== Geography ==
Dasna is located at 28.68°N 77.53°E. It has an average elevation of 207 metres (679 feet). There are other prominent landmarks situated near Dasna like Dasna jail, Delhi Meerut Expressway, Eastern Peripheral Expressway.

== Demographics ==
As of 2011 India census, Dasna had a population of 34,914. Males constitute 54% of the population and females 46%. Dasna has an average literacy rate of 66.98%, lower than the state average of 67.68%: male literacy rate is 76.46% and female literacy is 56.51%. In Dasna, 22% of the population is under 6 years of age.

=== Religion ===
Religion in Dasna (2021)
1. Islam (80.1%)
2. Hinduism (17.1%)
3. Sikh (0.90%)
4. Christianity (0.20%)
5. other (1.20%)
