= Partapur, Uttar Pradesh =

Partapur
- Town
- Country: India
- State: Uttar Pradesh
- District: Meerut district
- Tehsil: Meerut
- Time zone: UTC+5:30 (IST)
- PIN Code: 250103
- ISO 3166 code: IN-UP
- Vehicle registration: UP-15
- Website: up.gov.in

Partapur is a town in near Meerut city in Meerut district in western Uttar Pradesh, India.

It is home to the Ambedkar Airstrip, which is proposed by the state government to be converted to an international airport.
