= Meerut South RRTS station =

RapidX's Delhi–Meerut terminal RRTS cum Meerut Metro station

Meerut South
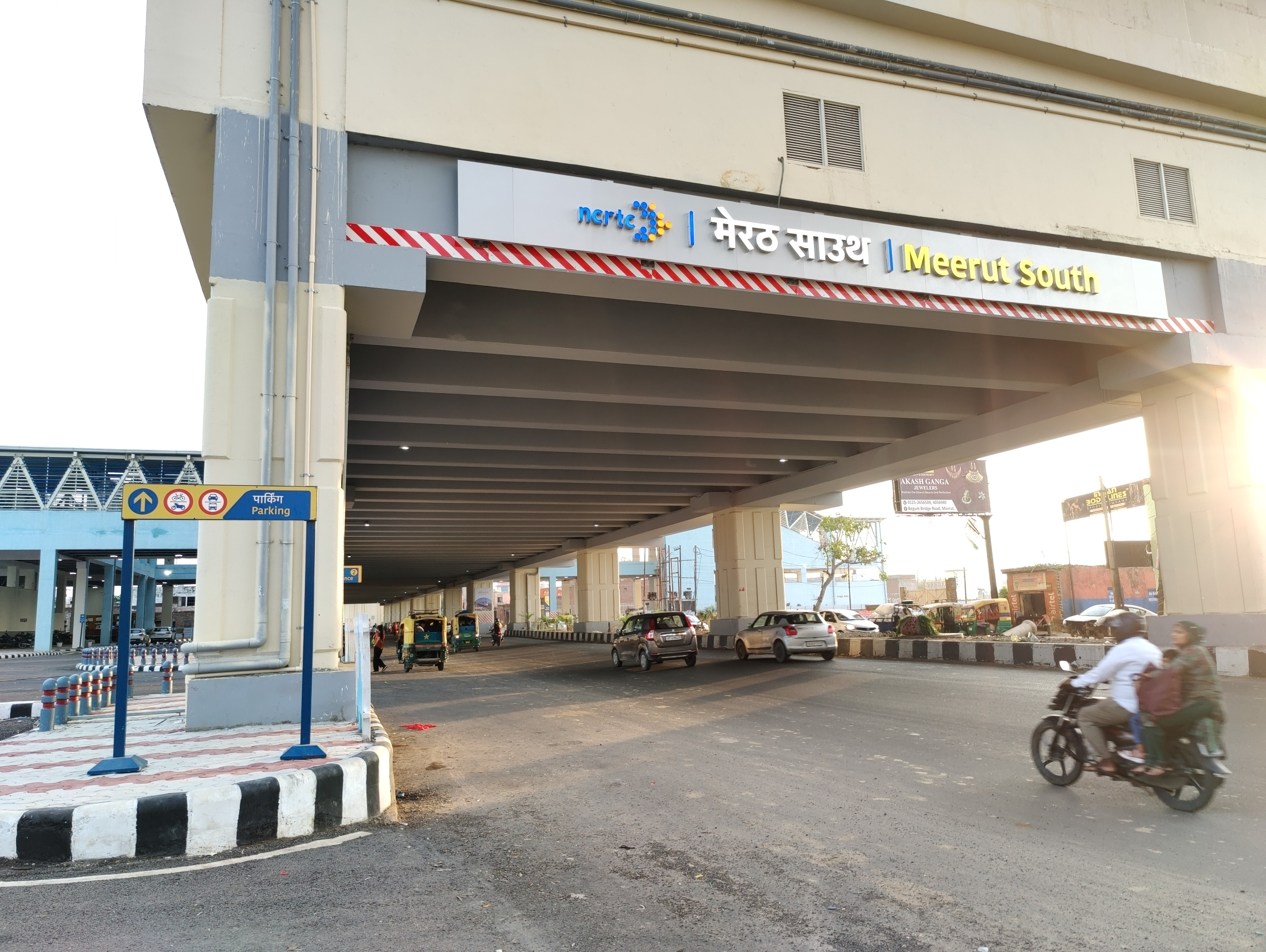
- Meerut South RRTS station

General information
- Location: NH 34, Bhood Baral, Uttar Pradesh 250103; India
- Coordinates: 28.90388°N 77.63203°E
- System: Namo Bharat RRTS station
- Owner: NCRTC
- Operator: NCRTC
- Lines: Delhi–Meerut RRTS; MRTS Line MRTS
- Platforms: Side platform Island platform (P2 & P3); Platform-1 → Modipuram; Platforms-2 & 3 → Sarai Kale Khan
- Tracks: 3

Construction
- Structure type: Elevated, Double track
- Platform levels: 2
- Parking: Two-Wheeler & Four-Wheeler Parking
- Accessible: Yes

Other information
- Status: Operational

History
- Opened: 18 August 2024; 2 years ago
- Electrified: 25 kV 50 Hz AC through overhead catenary

Services
Preceding station	Namo Bharat	Following station
Modinagar North towards Sarai Kale Khan	Delhi–Meerut	Shatabdi Nagar towards Modipuram
Preceding station	Meerut Metro	Following station
Terminus	MRTS Line	Partapur towards Modipuram Depot
Route map
Location

Meerut South RRTS station is a station of the Delhi–Meerut Regional Rapid Transit System and Meerut Metro located in the Partapur town of Uttar Pradesh, India. This is the first RRTS station in Meerut for higher-speed trains on the Delhi–Meerut RRTS that can reach speeds of up to 180 km/h. The section Duhai-Meerut South was opened on 18 August 2024, as an extension of the existing 34-km Sahibabad-Modinagar North stretch of the RRTS.

== History ==
The National Capital Region Transport Corporation (NCRTC) had invited tenders for the construction of the Meerut South RRTS station along with the 21.5 km long Murad Nagar–Meerut South section of the 82.15 km Delhi-Meerut RRTS line. L&T Heavy Civil Infrastructure emerged as the lowest bidder for construction work. Under the agreement, companies started construction of Meerut South RRTS station.

== Station layout ==
The Meerut South RRTS station has three levels - platform, concourse and street level. The station is be 215 meters long and 26 meters wide. The rail tracks as the viaduct is situated at a height of 24 meters above the ground level.

G	Street Level	Exit/ Entrance
L1	Mezzanine	Fare control, station agent, Metro Card vending machines, crossover
L2	Side platform | Doors will open on the left
L2	Platform 1 Eastbound	Towards → Modipuram; Next Station: Shatabdi Nagar
L2	Platform 2 Westbound	Towards ← Sarai Kale Khan; Next Station: Modinagar North
L2	Island platform | P2 Doors will open on the left | P3 Doors will open on the right
L2	Platform 3 Westbound	Towards ← Sarai Kale Khan; Next Station: Modinagar North
L2
