= Modipuram RRTS station =

RapidX's Delhi–Meerut terminal RRTS cum Meerut Metro station

Modipuram
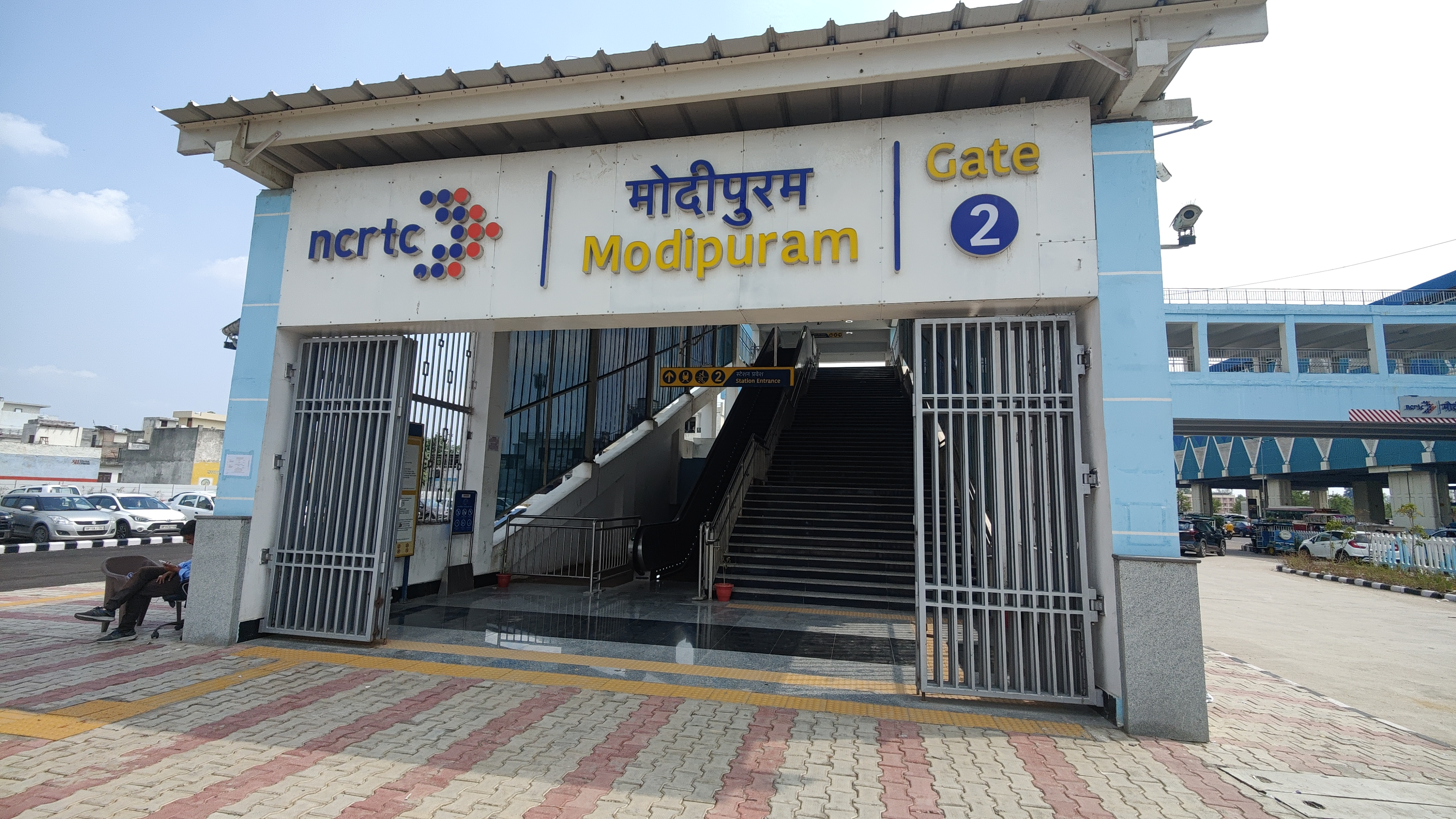

General information
- Location: National Highway 58, Modipuram, Meerut; India
- Coordinates: 29.07214°N 77.70880°E
- System: Namo Bharat RRTS station
- Owner: NCRTC
- Operator: NCRTC
- Lines: Delhi–Meerut RRTS; MRTS Line MRTS
- Tracks: 3

Construction
- Structure type: Elevated, Double track
- Platform levels: 2
- Parking: Two-Wheeler & Four-Wheeler Parking
- Accessible: Yes

Other information
- Status: Operational

History
- Opened: 22 February 2026; 6 months ago
- Electrified: 25 kV 50 Hz AC through overhead catenary

Services
Preceding station	Namo Bharat	Following station
Begumpul towards Sarai Kale Khan	Delhi–Meerut	Terminus
Preceding station	Meerut Metro	Following station
Meerut North towards Meerut South	MRTS Line	Modipuram Depot Terminus
Route map
Location

Modipuram RRTS station is the terminal station of the Delhi–Meerut Regional Rapid Transit System and Meerut Metro located in the Modipuram town of Uttar Pradesh, India. This is the Terminal station for the RRTS as well as Meerut Metro in Meerut for higher-speed trains on the Delhi–Meerut RRTS that can reach speeds of up to 180 km/h. The section Meerut South-Modipuram was opened on 22 February 2026
