= Modipuram Depot metro station =

Under-construction metro station in Uttar Pradesh, India

Modipuram Depot

General information
- Location: Siwaya-Jamalullapur, Meerut, Uttar Pradesh, India
- Coordinates: 29.08483°N 77.70254°E
- Owner: NCRTC
- Operator: NCRTC
- Line: MRTS Line MRTS
- Platforms: 2 side platforms Platform-1 → Terminus; Platform-2 → Meerut South
- Tracks: 2

Construction
- Structure type: At-grade
- Platform levels: 1
- Parking: In progress
- Accessible: In progress

Other information
- Status: Under construction

History
- Opened: Q3 2026
- Electrified: 25 kV 50 Hz AC through overhead catenary (in progress)

Services
Preceding station	Meerut Metro	Following station
Modipuram towards Meerut South	MRTS Line	Terminus
Route map
Location

The Modipuram Depot metro station is an under-construction at-grade or ground-level Meerut Metro station on the Delhi–Meerut RRTS corridor (also known as the Namo Bharat corridor) that will serve Siwaya-Jamalullapur in northern Modipuram, located in Meerut, Uttar Pradesh, India. It will serve as the last station and northern terminus of Meerut Metro and its trains, which run at a speed of 120 km/h. The RRTS trains, which will not stop here, will pass through the station at a slower speed due to the Modipuram Depot–also being built for maintenance and storage of the RRTS and metro trains, just ahead of the metro station. The station is being constructed, to be owned and operated by the National Capital Region Transport Corporation (NCRTC).

The station is expected to be ready with the depot by the third quarter of 2026, while the rest of the Delhi–Meerut RRTS corridor with Meerut Metro was inaugurated on 22 February 2026.

== History ==
The station is part of the 23 km-long Meerut Metro segment within the Delhi–Meerut RRTS corridor. Construction works began in early 2024 under the supervision of the National Capital Region Transport Corporation (NCRTC), due to Modipuram Depot's plan coming later than the RRTS and metro on the table. All major civil works and finishing works, including electrical and platform installations, are underway as of March 2026. It is expected to be finished by the third quarter of 2026, while the rest of the entire RRTS and metro corridors were inaugurated on 22 February 2026.

== Location ==
The station is being built just beside the Delhi–Meerut–Saharanpur line of the Indian Railways, east of Sardar Vallabhbhai Patel University of Agriculture and Technology (SVPUAT), northwest of Indian Council of Agricultural Research-Indian Institute of Farming Systems Research (ICAR-IIFSR) Modipuram, 4 km (2.5 mi) south of Daurala and its railway station, and close to the NH-334B running from Meerut to Roorkee in the east. Thanks to its location, the station will provide direct access to local transport routes, major landmarks and the outskirts of Meerut.

== Design and structure ==
The station is being designed as an at-grade or ground-level structure with two side platforms and two parallel tracks between them. The tracks will be used by both the RRTS trains–which will pass through without stopping, and metro trains–which will halt. This design will optimize land use and reduced construction costs, while also leaving space for future expansion or modifications.

=== Facilities ===
- Passenger waiting areas
- Ticket vending machines and smartcard facilities
- CCTV surveillance and security systems
- Platform screen doors (PSDs)
- Dedicated facilities for physically challenged passengers
- Parking and drop-off zones for last-mile connectivity

== Connectivity ==
Apart from serving the metro, the station will make multiple transport options accessible for ease of travel, including local modes like autorickshaws, buses and cabs. These plus points will improve accessibility and cut down travel time from Siwaya-Jamalullapur and towns like Daurala outside Meerut to Meerut South, directly to Delhi through the RRTS and to Meerut's city centre.

== Station layout ==
G
Street level
Exit/Entrance
G1
Mezzanine/Concourse
Fare control, Station agent, Facilities, Retail stores, Token and ticket vending machines, Crossover

G2
Side platform | Doors will open on the left
Platform 1
Northbound
Towards

Terminus
Next Station:
Modipuram Depot and Workshop

Platform 2
Southbound
Towards

Meerut South RRTS station
Next Station:
Modipuram

Side platform | Doors will open on the left
G2

== Modipuram Depot and Workshop ==
Roughly 400 metres ahead of the metro station, the Modipuram Depot is being built. Initially, the depot's plan did not exist as part of the RRTS corridor. Later, due to the corridor's long distance–which would have made ferrying trains to Duhai Depot from a far-off place like Meerut very difficult for storage and maintenance, the plan for a second depot at Modipuram was made in late 2022. By the time the plan was put forward by the NCRTC, the RRTS and metro corridors were already under construction. This is why the Modipuram Depot did not become operational with the rest of the RRTS corridor on 22 February 2026. Construction began from early 2024, and as of March 2026, it is expected to be finished by the end of 2026, along with the metro station.

The depot will be similar to the structure and design of the Duhai Depot. It will feature advanced amenities, including a Depot Control Centre (DCC), a train workshop, and 34 stabling lines to accommodate both Namo Bharat and Meerut Metro trainsets. The depot will also include:

• 4 inspection bay lines (IBLs)
• 4 workshop lines
• A 1.2 km-long test track
• Heavy internal and external coach cleaning facilities
• An automatic coach washing plant

== Future ==
In view of rise in traffic due to growth in population, Meerut's city expansion and heightened demand for Delhi, Modipuram Depot, along with all 13 stations of the metro, will have sufficient space to expand more to handle longer metro trains and greater number of passengers. This expansion will make the station aligned with other stations in the metro, thus enhancing connectivity between Delhi and Meerut even further in the next 10-20 years.

== See also ==
- Meerut Metro
- Delhi–Meerut Regional Rapid Transit System
- RapidX
- National Capital Region Transport Corporation
