= Namo Bharat =

Regional rail service in India

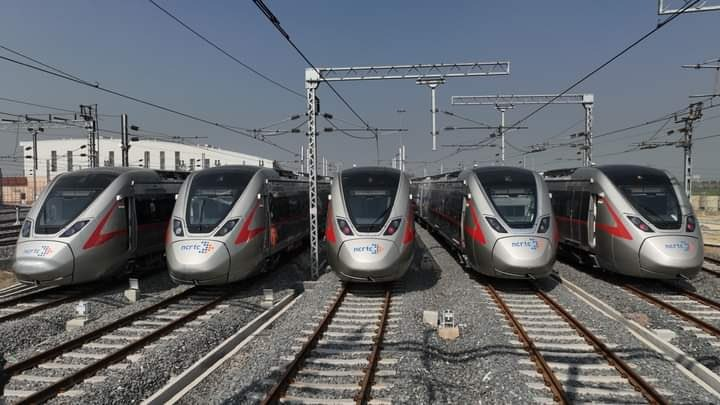

Overview
- Service type: Elevated regional rapid rail
- Status: Operating
- First service: 20 October 2023; 3 years ago
- Current operator: NCRTC
- Website: ncrtc.in

Route
- Lines used: 8 (planned); 1 (operational)

On-board services
- Classes: Economy class Business class Women's class
- Seating arrangements: 2-by-2 single aisle
- Observation facilities: Large windows for panoramic view
- Entertainment facilities: On-board Wi-Fi; electric outlets
- Baggage facilities: Overhead racks
- Other facilities: Reclining seats; Magazine holders; CCTV cameras; Smoke alarms; Fire extinguishers; Dynamic route display maps; Grab handles; Vending machine; Controlled ambient lighting; Door status indicators; Wide gangway

Technical
- Rolling stock: Namo Bharat trainset
- Track gauge: 1,435 mm (4 ft 8 1/2 in) standard gauge
- Electrification: 25 kV 50 Hz AC via overhead line
- Operating speed: 160–180 km/h (100–110 mph)
- Average length: 384 m (1,260 ft) (16 coaches); 192 m (630 ft) (8 coaches)
- Rake maintenance: Duhai Depot, Duhai, Uttar Pradesh

Namo Bharat is a regional rapid transit system operated by the National Capital Region Transport Corporation (NCRTC) in India's National Capital Region (NCR). It is a rail-based, semi-high-speed transit system designed to provide faster and more convenient connections between Delhi and major urban centres in the NCR. The system has a design speed of 180 km/h (110 mph), a maximum operational speed of 160 km/h (99 mph), and an average speed of approximately 90 km/h (56 mph).

== History ==
The proposal for a regional rapid transit service to connect Delhi with nearby towns was first mooted in a 1998–99 study commissioned by Indian Railways. In 2006, the proposal was re-examined in light of the extension of the Delhi Metro to some towns in the National Capital Region (NCR). Subsequently, the National Capital Region Planning Board (NCRPB) incorporated the proposal into its Functional Plan on Transport for NCR-2032, which recommended eight RRTS corridors to connect important towns across the region. In 2013, the Government of India established the National Capital Region Transport Corporation (NCRTC) as the implementing agency for the RRTS network in the NCR, with the objective of providing fast and comfortable transit to regional towns and meeting the growing demand for transportation in the region.

The regional rapid rail service was previously branded as RapidX. On 19 October 2023, a day before the inauguration of the first operational section, the service was renamed "Namo Bharat" (Hindi: नमो भारत). The name can be translated as "Salutations to India" in Sanskrit. The naming decision also drew criticism from opposition leaders, who pointed out that "NaMo" is commonly used as an abbreviation for Prime Minister Narendra Modi, linking the name to him.

In 2026, faster trains were introduced between two stations, Modipuram and Sarai Kela Khan, which led to travel time reduction of 50 minutes.

== Features ==
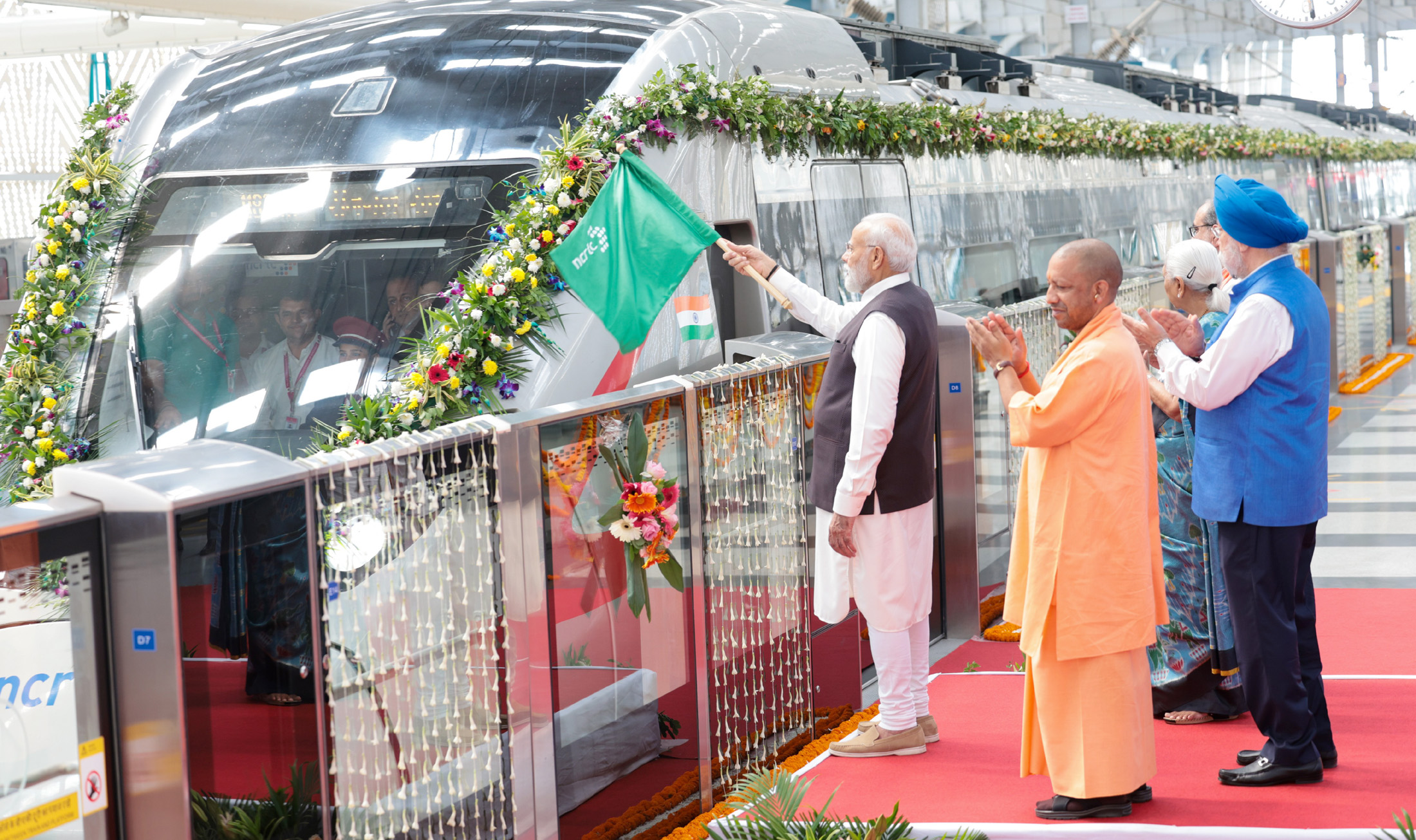
Namo Bharat trainset's inauguration

=== Integration ===
The three Phase-I Namo Bharat corridors, namely Delhi-Meerut, Delhi-Panipat, and Delhi-Alwar will converge at Sarai Kale Khan station in Delhi. These corridors will be interoperable, allowing trains to operate across different corridors and enabling passengers to travel between them without changing trains.

Namo Bharat stations are integrated with other modes of public transport wherever feasible, including airports, Indian Railways stations, inter-state bus terminals and Delhi Metro stations. This integration is intended to facilitate seamless transfers between different modes of transport and encourage greater use of public transit. Namo Bharat is planned to serve as the backbone of regional transportation across the National Capital Region, complementing existing urban transport systems such as the Delhi Metro. The Sarai Kale Khan Namo Bharat station also serves as a major multimodal transport hub, connecting with Hazrat Nizamuddin Railway Station, Delhi Metro's Pink Line and the Veer Haqiqat Rai Inter-State Bus Terminal.

Multimodal integration of Namo Bharat stations
Namo Bharat stations	Integration
Ghaziabad	Red Line Shaheed Sthal
New Ashok Nagar	Blue Line New Ashok Nagar
Anand Vihar	Blue Line Pink Line Anand Vihar Anand Vihar ISBT UPSRTC bus depot (Kaushambi) Anand Vihar Terminal
Sarai Kale Khan	Pink Line Sarai Kale Khan Nizamuddin Hazrat Nizamuddin Sarai Kale Khan ISBT
INA	Pink Line Dilli Haat – INA
Aerocity	Indira Gandhi International Airport Airport ExpressGolden Line Delhi Aerocity
Udyog Vihar	Proposed extension of Rapid Metro Gurgaon
Kherki Dhaula toll	Proposed bus terminus
Panchgao	Proposed ISBT Proposed multimodal hub
Bawal	Bawal bus stand

=== Ticketing ===
Passengers can use any National Common Mobility Card (NCMC)-compliant card to travel on Namo Bharat services. These cards can be purchased or recharged at any station ticket counters. Other ticketing options include digital QR code-based tickets through the Namo Bharat Connect mobile application, and paper QR code-based journey tickets are available from ticket counters and Ticket Vending Machines (TVMs). The TVMs are equipped with credit, debit and prepaid card readers. They also accept cash and UPI payments.

=== Facilities ===
Six-coach configuration: Each Namo Bharat train consists of six coaches, with five standard coaches and one premium coach. The train accommodates both seated and standing passengers, with an overall capacity of approximately 1,400 to 1,500 passengers.

Premium coach: Each train has a dedicated premium coach offering additional amenities, including reclining seats, mobile and laptop charging points, footrests and coat hooks.

Premium lounge: Dedicated premium lounges are provided at stations, offering exclusive access to passengers travelling in the premium coach.

Women's coach: Each Namo Bharat train has one coach reserved for women passengers, positioned next to the premium coach. Seats for women, senior citizens and persons with disabilities are also reserved in the other coaches.

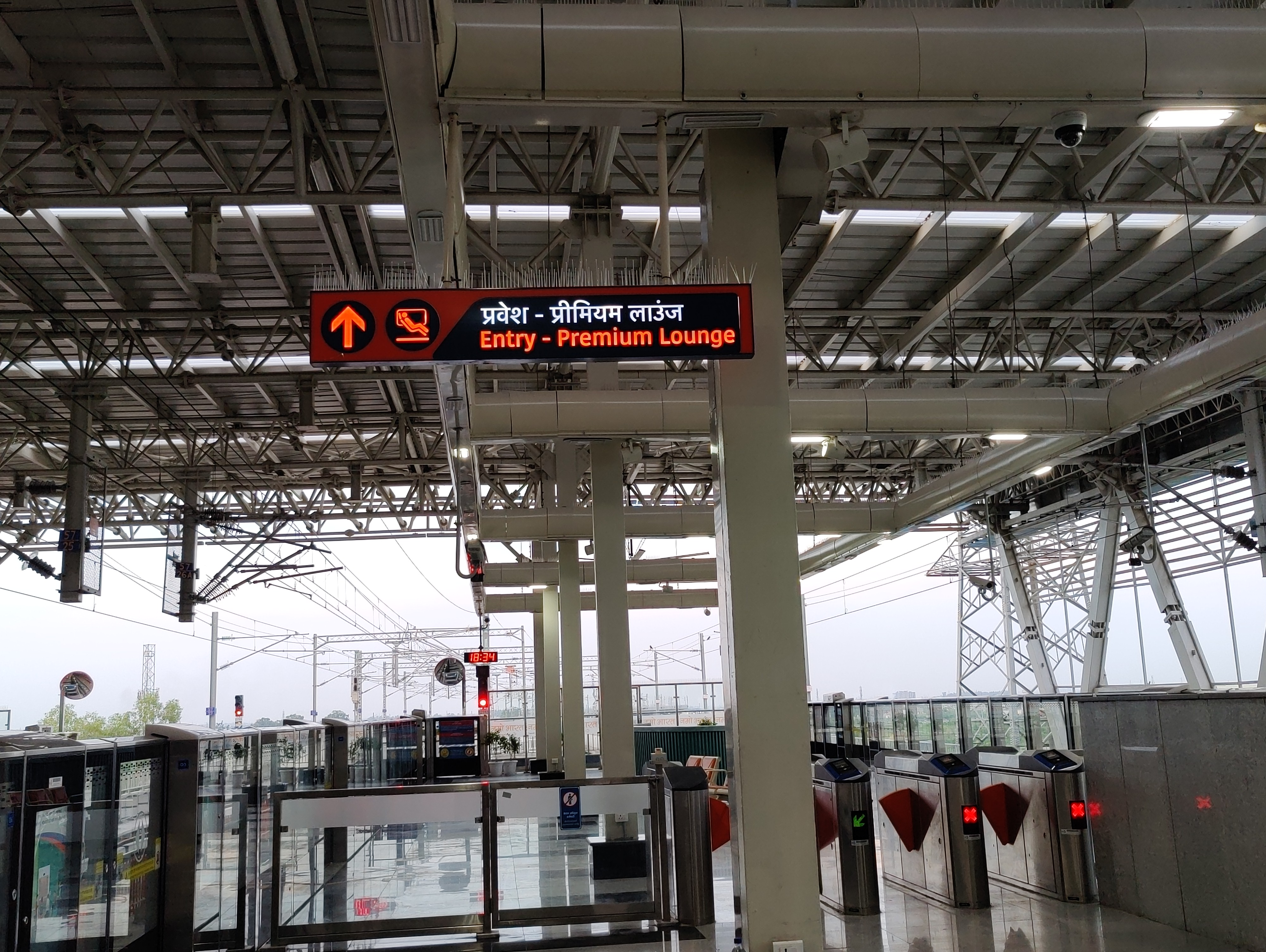
Each station features a premium lounge with exclusive AFC gates, accessible with a premium ticket, along with a dedicated premium coach on every train

=== Safety ===
Onboard safety: Namo Bharat trains are equipped with CCTV cameras, an emergency door-opening mechanism and Passenger Emergency Communication Units (PECUs), which allow passengers to communicate with the train operator in case of an emergency.

Platform screen doors: Every Namo Bharat station is equipped with platform screen doors (PSDs), which are synchronised with the train doors and integrated with the signalling system. The train can move only when both the platform screen doors and train doors are securely closed, reducing the risk of passengers falling onto the tracks.

=== Wireless Railway Signalling System ===
Nokia partnered with Alstom to deploy a private 4.9G/LTE wireless network to support the European Train Control System (ETCS) Level 2 signalling on Phase I of the RRTS. The combination was described by Nokia as a world-first application of an LTE network to support ETCS Level 2 signalling, providing reliable communication for train control and other mission-critical railway operations.

The ETCS Level 2 system enables trains to continuously communicate with trackside equipment and report their precise location in real time. This information supports continuous monitoring of train movements and can also be used to provide passengers with updates on train locations.

=== Cargo handling ===
NCRTC has proposed using the RRTS infrastructure for cargo transportation during non-peak hours, with separate freight trains carrying goods such as milk, fruits and vegetables. The proposal aims to make better use of the network's infrastructure while reducing the number of goods vehicles on roads, thereby helping to ease congestion and air pollution. Under the proposed logistics model, selected train depots would be equipped with warehouses, cold-storage facilities and other infrastructure for cargo handling.

In October 2026, NCRTC signed an agreement with Blue Dart to explore the feasibility of transporting express parcels through the Delhi–Meerut Namo Bharat corridor.

== Technology ==
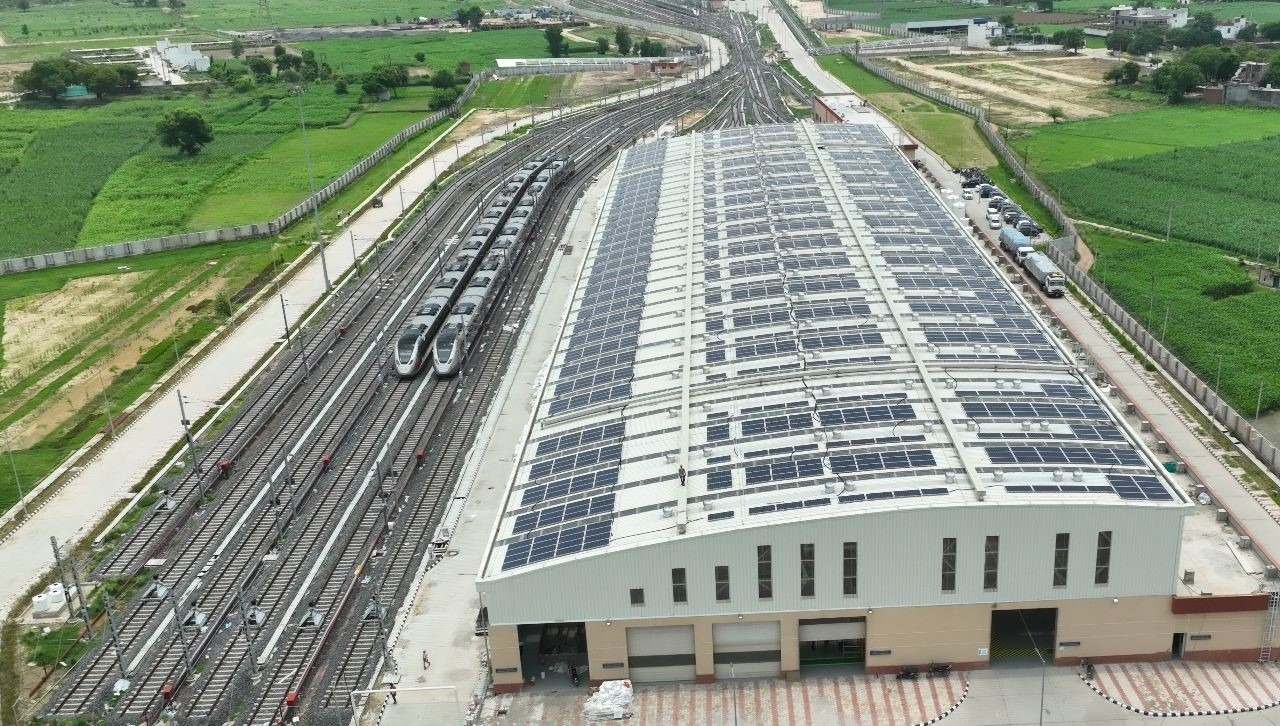
RapidX depot at Duhai

NCRTC is developing a rail-based regional rapid transit system in the National Capital Region, designed for speeds of up to 180 km/h (110 mph). The infrastructure incorporates grade-separated tracks and advanced signalling and train control systems to support high-speed operations, passenger capacity and safety. The trains are air-conditioned and designed for rapid acceleration and deceleration.

Traction power is supplied through a specially designed 25 kV AC overhead catenary system. A flexible overhead catenary system (FOCS) is used on elevated and at-grade sections, while a rigid overhead catenary system (ROCS) is installed in tunnels to accommodate their spatial constraints and high-speed operating requirements.

=== Rolling stock ===
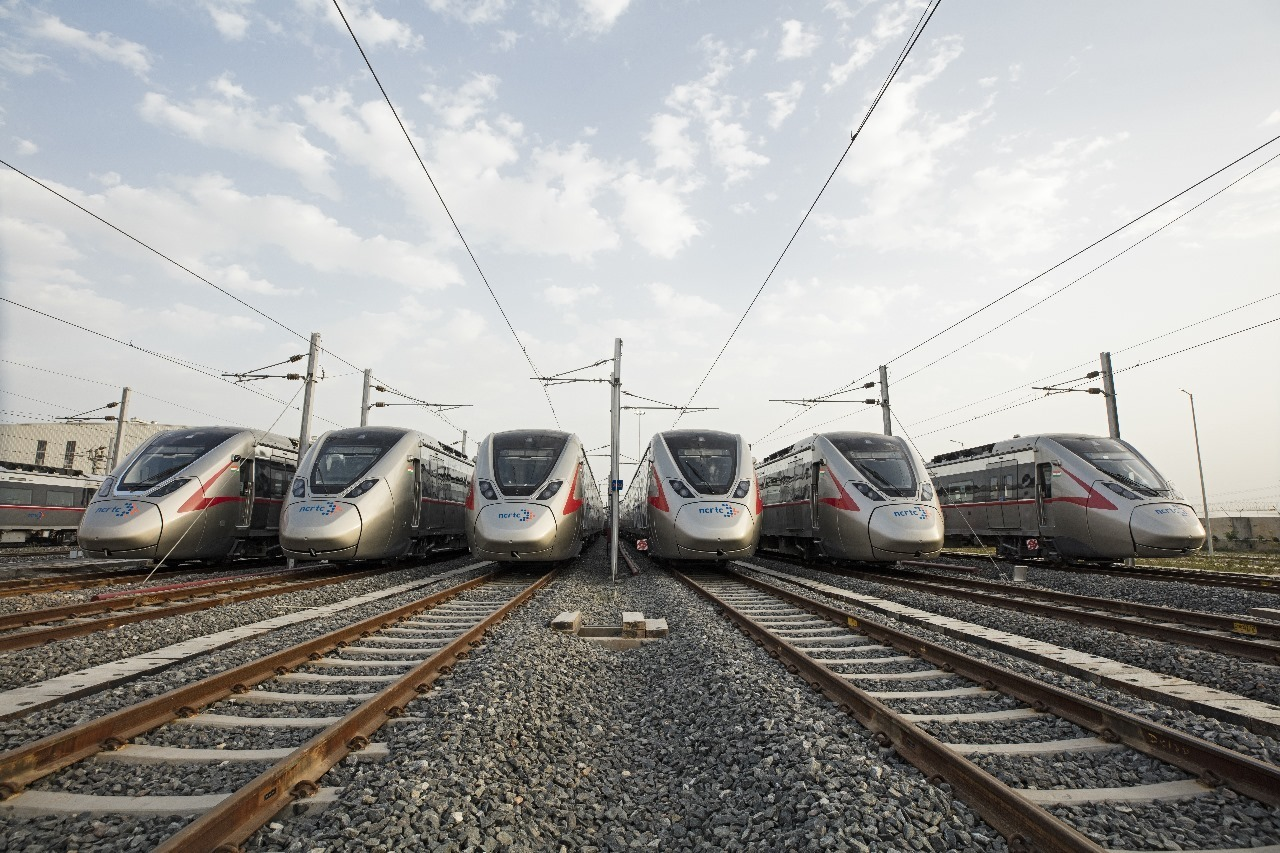
Namo Bharat trainset

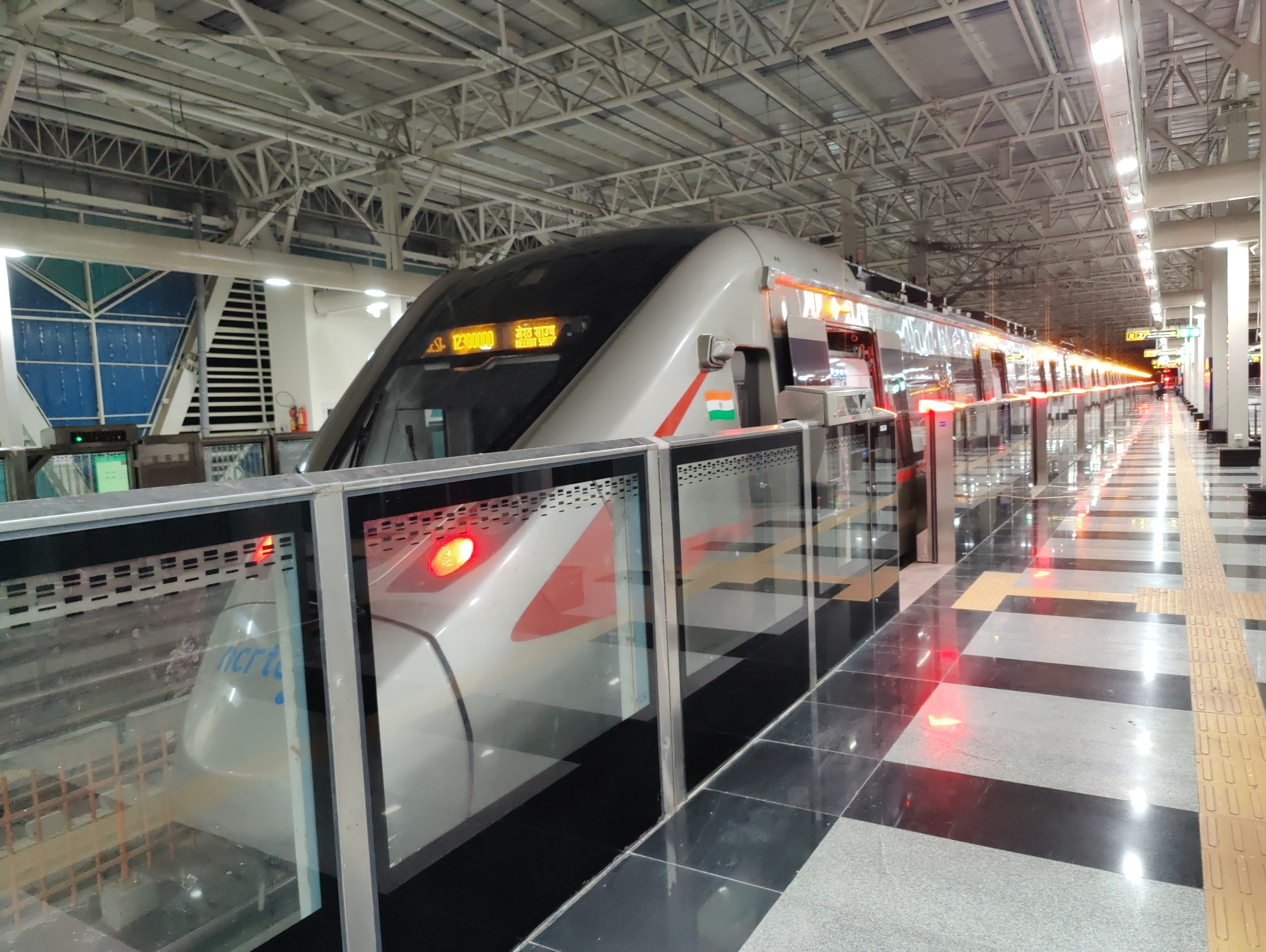
Meerut South station

The Namo Bharat trainsets were specifically designed for fast and comfortable regional commutes. Their aerodynamic design helps reduce air resistance at high speeds, with a design speed of 180 km/h (110 mph) and a maximum operational speed of 160 km/h (99 mph). The trainsets were designed at Alstom's engineering centre in Hyderabad and manufactured at its facility in Savli, Gujarat. The manufacturing contract was originally awarded to Bombardier Transportation in 2020, before its rail business was acquired by Alstom in 2021.

=== Track and signalling ===
==== Ballastless track ====
The Slab Track Austria system, developed by Austrian company PORR, was introduced in India for the first time for the Namo Bharat project. Designed to support high-speed operations of up to 180 km/h (110 mph), the system uses precast concrete slabs instead of conventional railway ballast. It offers greater durability, low maintenance requirements and the ability to replace individual slabs when necessary.

==== ETCS Level 2 signalling system ====
The Namo Bharat system uses the European Train Control System (ETCS) Level 2, implemented with Hybrid Level 3 functionality over a Long-Term Evolution (LTE) communication network. This technology was introduced in India for the first time on the RRTS. The system incorporates Automatic Train Protection (ATP), Automatic Train Operation (ATO) and Automatic Train Supervision (ATS), along with virtual block signalling to support high-frequency train operations.

The system continuously monitors train movements, including their speed and location, and communicates operational instructions through a Radio Block Centre (RBC). The use of virtual blocks enables closer train spacing while maintaining safe separation. The signalling system also supports interoperability between the Namo Bharat corridors, allowing compatible trains to operate across them.

=== Construction technology ===
==== Systematic Program Evaluation for Efficient Delivery of Project (SPEED) ====
Systematic Programme Evaluation for Efficient Delivery of Project (SPEED) is an in-house, cloud-based project management and monitoring platform developed by NCRTC. It is designed to capture and report activities during the pre-construction and construction phases of the RRTS project in real time. Its dashboard provides progress reports, tracks construction delays and identifies areas requiring attention, helping project authorities monitor implementation and take timely corrective action. The platform is built using technological frameworks such as JavaScript and PHP.

==== Common Data Environment (CDE) ====
NCRTC has implemented an indigenously developed Common Data Environment (CDE) as a centralised digital repository for all construction and pre-construction drawings, technical documents and project models. It enables stakeholders to access, share, view and comment on updated project information in real time, maintaining a single source of truth across the organisation. Its built-in workflow management system facilitates the preparation, review and approval of drawings and technical documents by different stakeholders at various levels of the organisation. The platform also improves transparency and the efficiency of document search and retrieval.

==== Building Information Modelling (BIM) ====
BIM is an intelligent, 3D model-based process used by architecture, engineering and construction professionals to plan, design, construct and manage buildings and infrastructure. It combines information from multiple disciplines, including architecture, structural engineering, mechanical, electrical, plumbing and fire safety, into a coordinated digital model. The model helps improve design coordination, identify potential conflicts between different building systems and generate construction drawings and other project information. NCRTC has adopted BIM for the design and development of Namo Bharat stations and other infrastructure components.

==== Continuously Operating Reference Stations (CORS) ====
NCRTC has deployed a Continuously Operating Reference Station (CORS) network to improve geolocation accuracy during civil construction surveys on the Delhi–Ghaziabad–Meerut RRTS corridor. The system consists of multiple Global Navigation Satellite System (GNSS) reference stations installed at fixed locations along the corridor and connected to a central control station. Operating round the clock, these stations provide real-time positioning corrections to surveyors using GNSS receivers, enabling location measurements with an accuracy of approximately 5 mm (0.20 in)-10 mm (0.39 in). The technology reduces distance-dependent, atmospheric and manual errors, helping achieve precise alignment of civil structures and tracks while reducing the time and effort required for conventional surveying.

== Network ==
=== Summary ===
Operational
Under construction
Proposed

Route	States	Length	Construction began	Opening	Notes	Map
Delhi–Meerut	Delhi and Uttar Pradesh	82 km (51 mi)	January 2019	22 February 2026	Fully operational.	
Delhi–Alwar	Delhi, Haryana and Rajasthan	164 km (102 mi)	August 2026 (tentative)	November 2031	Pre-construction works are underway.	
Kanpur-Ayodhya	Uttar Pradesh	160 km (99 mi)	TBD	2031	Project has been Approved.	
Ghaziabad-Jewar	Delhi and Uttar Pradesh	72 km (45 mi)	TBD	2028	DPR awaiting approval.	
Delhi–Panipat	Delhi and Haryana	103 km (64 mi)	TBD	TBD	DPR awaiting approval.	
Thiruvananthapuram–Kasaragod	Kerala	583 km (362 mi)	TBD	2036	Feasibility study Approved.	
Patna–Arrah	Bihar	TBD	TBD	TBD	DPR Approved.	
Patna–Begusarai	Bihar	TBD	TBD	TBD	DPR Approved.	
Patna–Muzaffarpur	Bihar	TBD	TBD	TBD	DPR Approved.	
Patna–Gaya	Bihar	TBD	TBD	TBD	DPR Approved.	
Kolkata–Mayapur	West Bengal	135 km (84 mi)	TBD	TBD	Proposed.	
Kolkata–Asansol	West Bengal	232 km (144 mi)	TBD	TBD	Proposed.	
Kolkata–Nandigram	West Bengal	102 km (63 mi)	TBD	TBD	Proposed.	
Kolkata–Medinipur	West Bengal	135 km (84 mi)	TBD	TBD	Proposed.	
Bengaluru–Mysuru	Karnataka	145 km (90 mi)	TBD	TBD	Proposed.	
Bengaluru–Chikkaballapura	Karnataka	64 km (40 mi)	TBD	TBD	Proposed.	
Bengaluru–Tumakuru	Karnataka	60 km (37 mi)	TBD	TBD	Proposed.	
Bengaluru–Kolar	Karnataka	65 km (40 mi)	TBD	TBD	Proposed.	
Bengaluru–Kanakapura	Karnataka	60 km (37 mi)	TBD	TBD	Proposed.	
Chennai–Villupuram	Tamil Nadu	170 km (110 mi)	TBD	TBD	Proposed.	
Chennai–Vellore	Tamil Nadu	140 km (87 mi)	TBD	TBD	Proposed.	
Coimbatore–Salem	Tamil Nadu	185 km (115 mi)	TBD	TBD	Proposed.	
Ahmedabad–Sanand	Gujarat	TBD	TBD	TBD	Proposed to link satellite towns.	
Vadodara–Savli	Gujarat	TBD	TBD	TBD	Proposed.	
Gandhinagar–Kalol	Gujarat	TBD	TBD	TBD	Proposed.	
Surat–Bardoli	Gujarat	TBD	TBD	TBD	Proposed.	
Rajkot–Hirasar	Gujarat	TBD	TBD	TBD	Proposed.	
Hyderabad–Warangal	Telangana	TBD	TBD	TBD	Proposed.	
Hyderabad–Vijayawada	Telangana and Andhra Pradesh	TBD	TBD	TBD	Proposed.	
Pune–Nashik	Maharashtra	235 km (146 mi)	TBD	2029	Proposed. Survey and feasibility report completed.	

== See also ==
- Urban rail transit in India
- High-speed rail in India
- Dedicated freight corridors in India
- Vande Bharat Express
- Amrit Bharat Station Scheme
- Indian Railways
