= National Capital Region Transport Corporation =

Indian rail transport company

National Capital Region Transport Corporation Limited (NCRTC)
- Type: Public Sector Enterprise
- Industry: Public transport
- Founded: 21 August 2013; 13 years ago
- Headquarters: GatiShakti Bhawan, INA, New Delhi, Delhi – 110023
- Key people: Shalabh Goel, IRSEE (managing director)
- Services: RapidX
- Revenue: ▲₹139.572 crore (US$15 million) (2022-23)
- Net income: ▲₹80.0024 crore (US$8.5 million) (2022–23)
- Owner: Ministry of Housing and Urban Affairs (22.5%); Ministry of Railways (22.5%); NCRPB (5.0%); Delhi (12.5%); Haryana (12.5%); Rajasthan (12.5%); Uttar Pradesh (12.5%)
- Number of employees: 396 (2023)
- Subsidiaries: NCRTC Express Transit Limited (NETRA)
- Website: ncrtc.in

The National Capital Region Transport Corporation (NCRTC) is a joint venture company of the Government of India and the states of Haryana, Rajasthan, Uttar Pradesh, and Delhi. It is mandated to implement the Regional Rapid Transit System (RRTS) project across the National Capital Region (NCR). The managing director of NCRTC is Shalabh Goel.

== Establishment ==
The idea of an integrated commuter railway network connecting Delhi with nearby towns in the National Capital Region was first mooted in 1998–99 in a study commissioned by Indian Railways. The Union Cabinet approved the constitution of the NCRTC under the Companies Act, 1956, on 11 July 2013. The NCRTC was tasked with designing, developing, implementing, financing, operating, and maintaining the RRTS in the NCR to provide comfortable and fast transit to NCR towns and meet the growing demand for rapid transport in the region. The NCRTC was incorporated on 21 August 2013, and Vinay Kumar Singh was appointed as its first regular managing director in 2016.

The NCRTC is authorised to form subsidiary companies to implement individual corridors. The initial seed capital of ₹100 crore (US$11 million) was to be contributed as follows:

Government of India	
Ministry of Housing & Urban Affairs	22.5%
Ministry of Railways	22.5%
National Capital Region Planning Board	5.0%

State governments	
Government of NCT Delhi	12.5%
Government of Uttar Pradesh	12.5%
Government of Rajasthan	12.5%
Government of Haryana	12.5%

Out of the eight RRTS corridors identified for development in the National Capital Region, the following three were prioritised for implementation by a Task Force appointed by India's erstwhile Planning Commission:

- Delhi-Ghaziabad-Meerut
- Delhi–Gurugram–Rewari–Alwar
- Delhi–Sonipat–Panipat

== Implementation ==
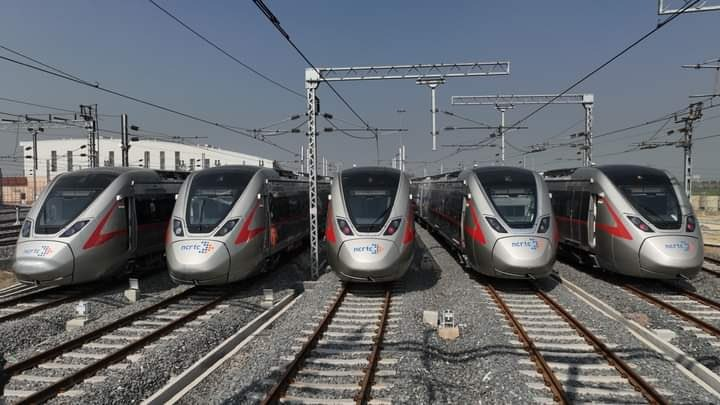
Namo Bharat trains

The proposed RRTS network was expected to reduce travel time between Delhi and major NCR towns, facilitating seamless travel between the Central Business District (CBD) and the suburbs of the National Capital Region. The three priority corridors connecting Delhi with Panipat, Meerut, and Alwar were recommended by the National Capital Region Planning Board (NCRPB). The Delhi Government approved the alignments of these corridors in June 2014, while approvals from the other state governments were required subsequently.

In its 36th meeting, held on 15 June 2016 under the chairmanship of Union Urban Development Minister M. Venkaiah Naidu, the NCRPB gave the nod to the implementation of three RRTS corridors: Delhi–Alwar, Delhi–Panipat, and Delhi–Meerut. Further, Minister Naidu stated that issues related to the Regional Rapid Transit System (RRTS) had been resolved and that work on these three corridors could begin immediately. The minister also stated that a managing director had been appointed to oversee the implementation of the RRTS and that work on the corridors would commence shortly. Shri Vinay Kumar Singh, an Indian Railways officer, was appointed as the Managing Director of the company on 25 April 2016 and assumed office on 8 July 2016 as its first regular Managing Director.

== See also ==
- National High Speed Rail Corporation Limited
- Dedicated Freight Corridor Corporation of India
- Amrit Bharat Station Scheme
- Future of rail transport in India
- Rapid transit in India
