= Meerut =

Metropolis in Uttar Pradesh, India

- Metropolis
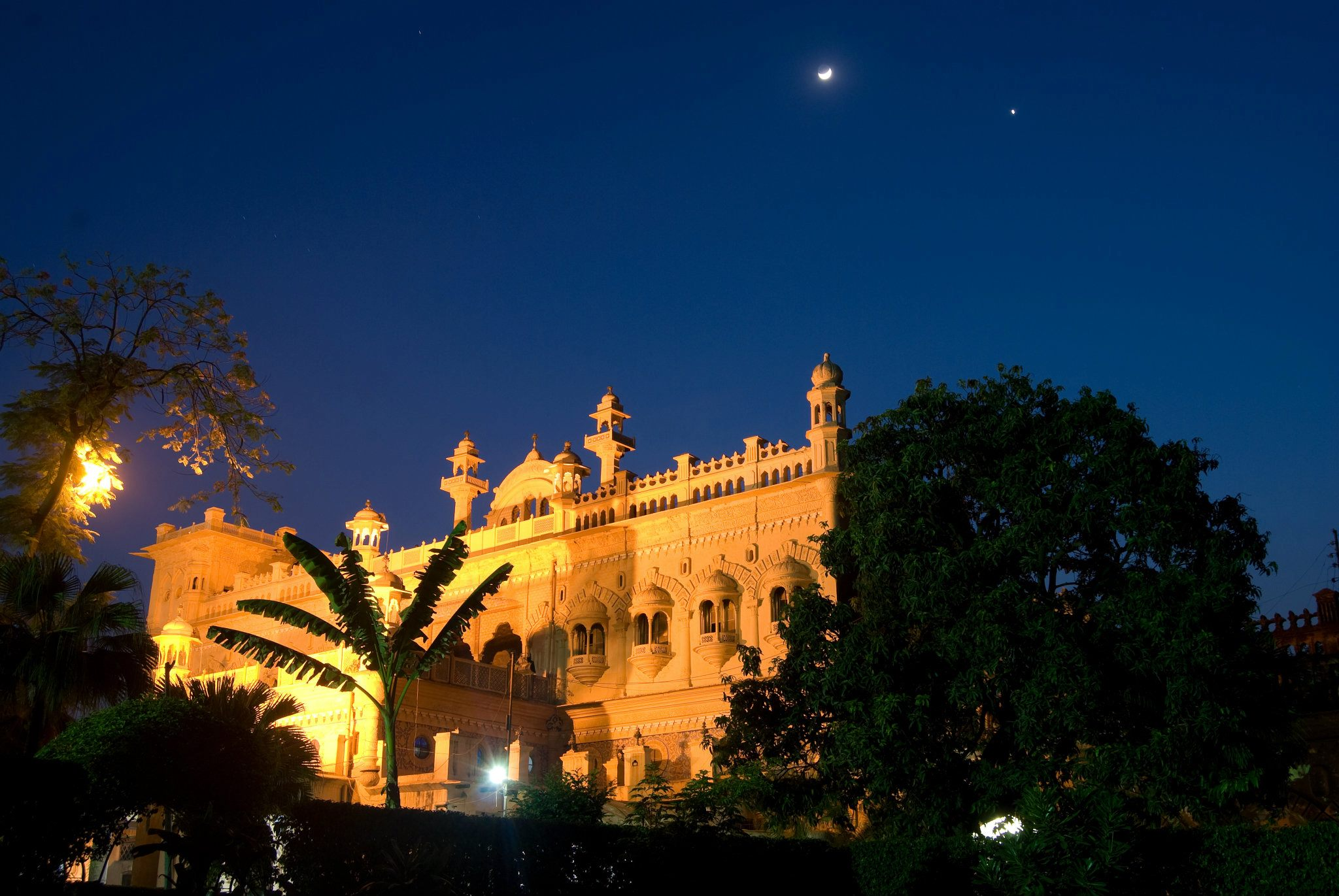
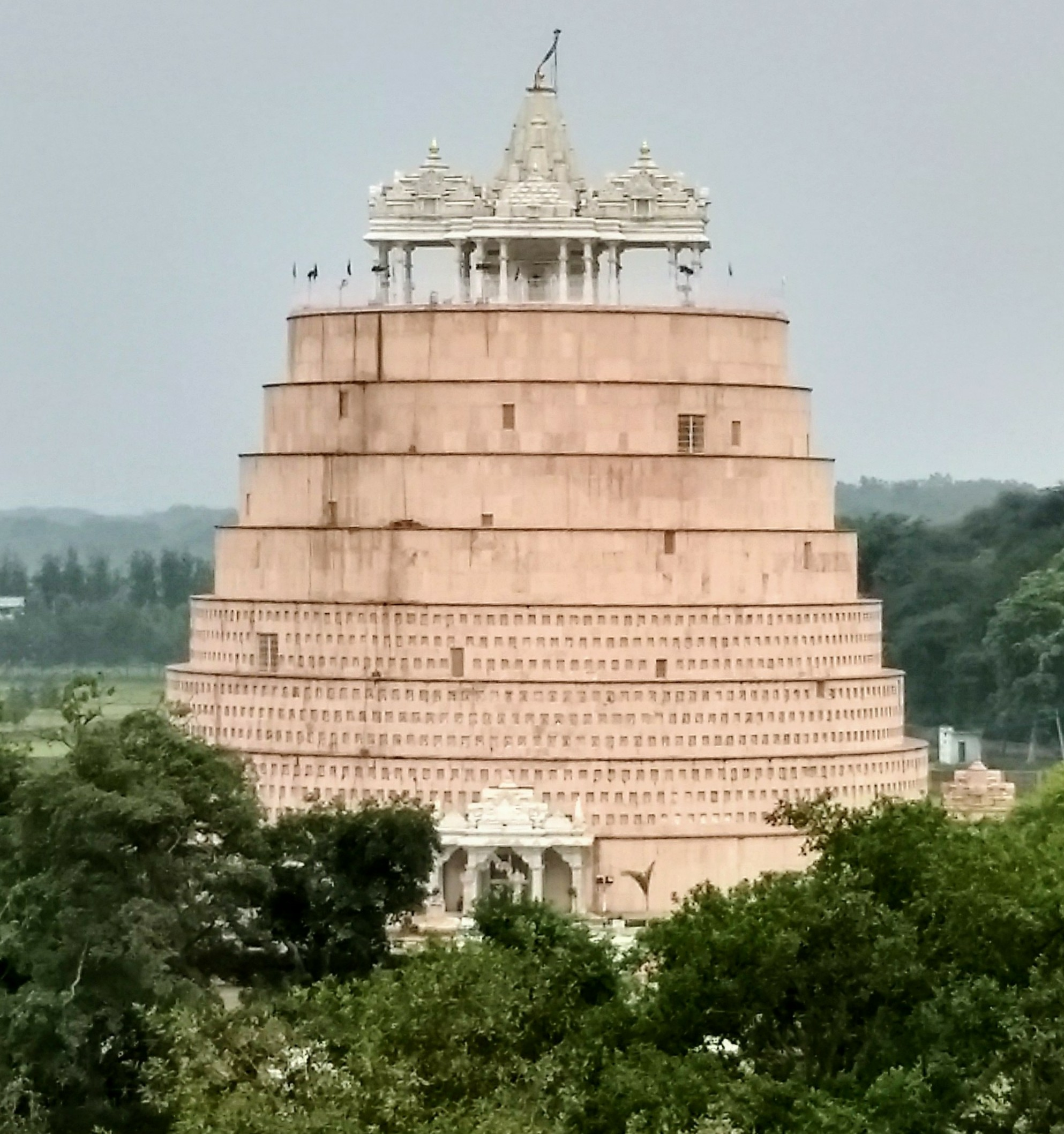
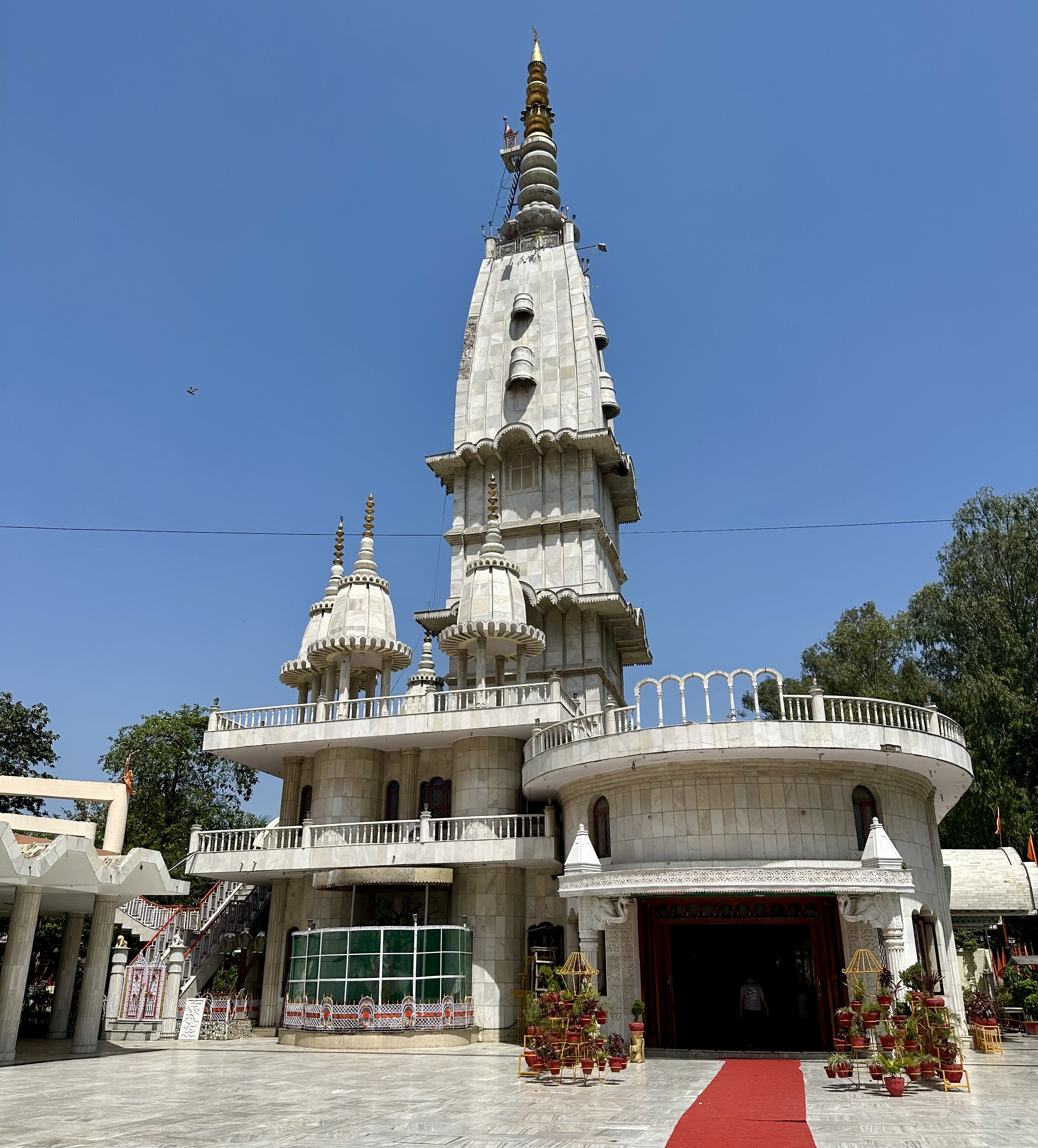
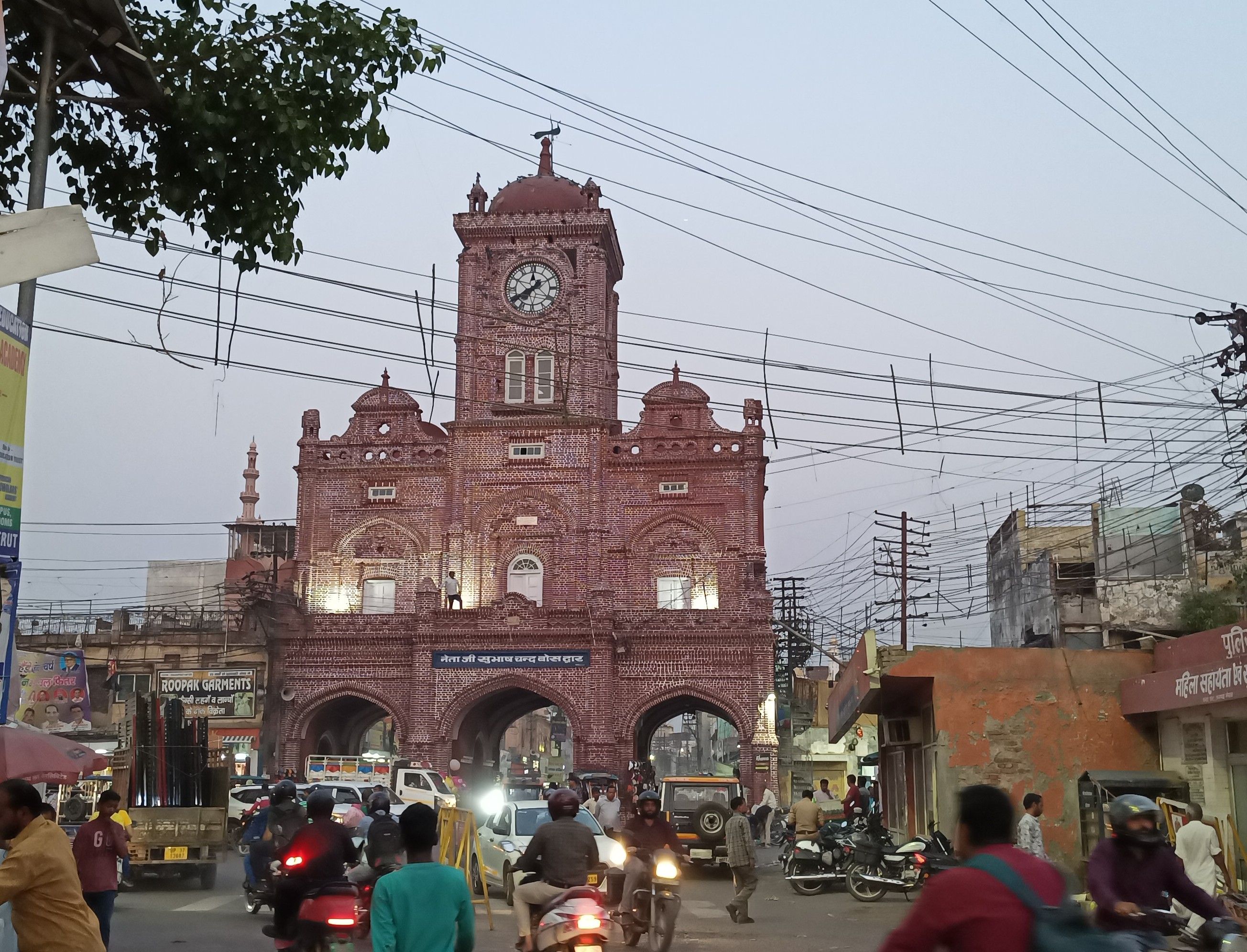
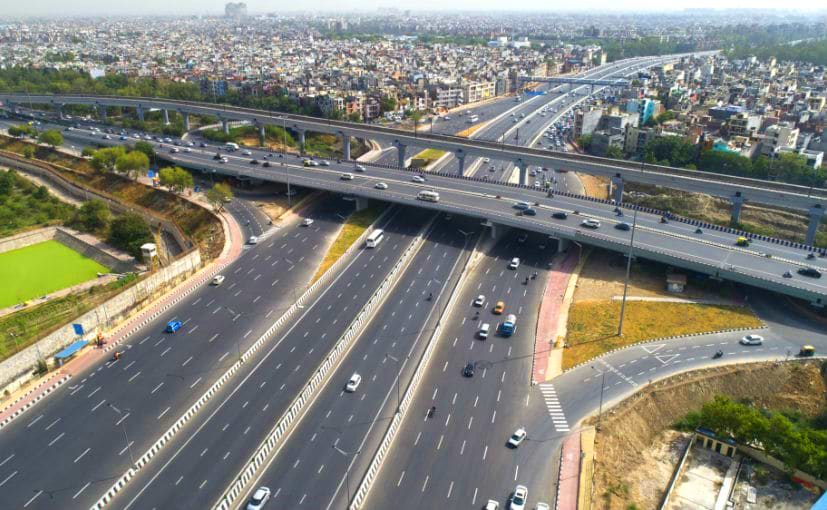
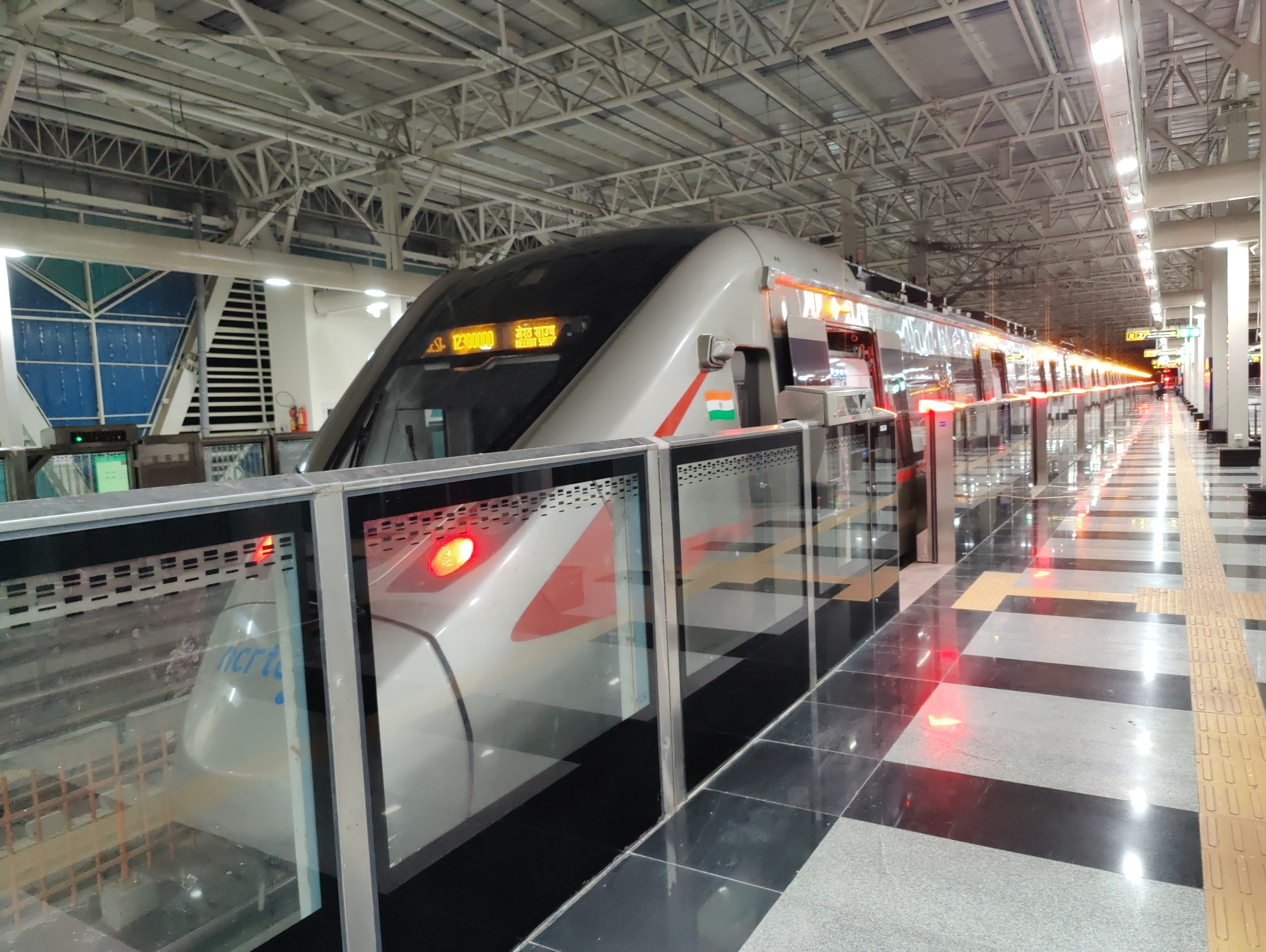
- Mustafa Castle Ashtapad Hastinapur Jain Temple Kali Paltan Mandir Clock Tower Delhi–Meerut Expressway RRTS train

- Location within Uttar Pradesh Location within India
- Coordinates: 28.98°N 77.71°E
- Country: India
- State: Uttar Pradesh
- Division: Meerut
- District: Meerut
- Established: 12 May 1867

Government
  - Body: Meerut Municipal Corporation
  - Mayor: Harikant Ahluwalia (BJP)
  - Lok Sabha MP: Arun Govil, (BJP)
  - Divisional Commissioner: Dr. Hrishikesh Bhaskar Yashod, IAS
  - DIG Range: Kalanidhi Naithani, IPS

Area
  - Metropolis: 450 km^{2} (170 sq mi)
- Elevation: 247 m (810 ft)

Population (2016)
  - Metropolis: 1,571,434
  - Density: 3,500/km^{2} (9,000/sq mi)
  - Metro: 1,871,434

Language
  - Official: Hindi
  - Additional official: Urdu
  - Regional: Khadiboli
- Time zone: UTC+5:30 (IST)
- PIN: 250 0xx
- Telephone code: 91- 121- XXXX XXX
- Vehicle registration: UP-15
- Website: meerut.nic.in

Meerut (Note: Hindi: Mēraṭh, pronounced [ˈme(ː)ɾəʈʰ]) is a city that serves as the administrative headquarters of the Meerut district in the Indian state of Uttar Pradesh. The city lies in western Uttar Pradesh and is part of the Indian National Capital Region (NCR). Meerut is located 80 km (50 mi) northeast of the national capital, New Delhi, and 480 km (300 mi) northwest of the state capital, Lucknow. As of 2025, Meerut's urban (metro) population is estimated at ≈ 1.875 million. The population of Meerut Municipal Corporation is projected to be about 1.907 million, while the wider Meerut metropolitan region is estimated at approximately 2.077 million. Meerut is the second or third-most populous city in NCR, after Delhi and Ghaziabad.

In 1803, Meerut was as a significant location during the British colonial era, serving as the site of one of India's largest cantonments. Meerut was one of the first locations where the 1857 rebellion against British rule began. It has been called the "Sports City of India" due to its sports goods industry. Meerut produces large number of musical instruments in India. It is also one of Asia's largest gold markets. The city is an education hub in western Uttar Pradesh and has the third-highest per capita income after Ghaziabad and Gautam Buddha Nagar (Noida and Greater Noida). (Note: Ghaziabad Municipal Corporation is divided into five zones: City Zone, Kavi Nagar Zone, Vijay Nagar Zone, Mohan Nagar Zone, and Vasundhara Zone.)

India's first Regional Rapid Transit System, Delhi Meerut RRTS, is operational in Meerut and serves as an inter-city high-speed metro corridor. Meerut is connected by three expressways, including the Delhi-Meerut Expressway, the Ganga Expressway, and the Meerut-Kanpur Expressway.

== Origin of the name ==
The name Meerut (Hindi: मेरठ Meraṭh) is believed to have evolved from Mayarashtra (मयराष्ट्र), the capital city of the mythological kingdom ruled by Mayasura, a legendary architect and the father of Mandodari, wife of Ravana. Over the centuries, the name underwent several transformations—such as Mairashtra, Mai-dant-ka-khera, and Mairaath—before settling into its current form, Meerut.

Another tradition attributes the city's origin to King Yudhishthira, who is said to have granted the land to Mayasura in recognition of his architectural prowess. According to this account, Mayasura named the region Maharashtra (not to be confused with the modern day Indian state of Maharashtra), which eventually morphed into Meerut due to linguistic and historical evolution.

An alternative version suggests, that Meerut was part of the dominions of King Mahipala, the ruler of Indraprastha, and that the city's name is derived from his association with the area.

== History ==
=== Ancient era ===
Archaeological excavations conducted between 1950 and 1952 at Vidura-ka-Tila, a collection of several mounds named after Vidura 37 km (23 miles) northeast of Meerut, concluded that Meerut contains the remains of the ancient city of Hastinapur, the capital of the Kauravas and Pandavas of Mahabharata, which was washed away by floods from the Ganges.

Meerut also contained a Harappan settlement known as Alamgirpur, the easternmost settlement of the Indus Valley civilisation. Meerut was a centre of Buddhism during the reign of Mauryan emperor Ashoka (r. 273 BC to 232 BC.), and remains of Buddhist structures were found near the congregational mosque in the present day city. The Ashoka Pillar, at Delhi Ridge, was carried to Delhi from Meerut by Firuz Shah Tughluq (r. 1351–1388). It was later damaged in a 1713 explosion and restored in 1867.

In Hindu mythology, Meerut has a strong connection to the Mahabharata. One of the main characters in the epic, Draupadi, is believed by the locals to have been born here.

=== Muslim conquests ===
In the eleventh century AD, the region to the south-west of the city was ruled by Har Dat, the Dor Raja of Bulandshahr. He built a fort, which was long known for its strength and was mentioned in the Ain-i-Akbari. He was later defeated by Mahmud of Ghazni in 1018 and surrendered along with his forces to Mahmud. The Jama Masjid (Congregational mosque), a prominent local landmark, was said to be built by Mahmud's vizier in this period. Shortly after its capture, the city was regained by the local Hindu raja and part of his fortifications, built for the city's defence, survived into modern times. Muhammad of Ghor's mamluk general Qutb-ud-din Aybak attacked and captured Meerut in 1193.

Timur attacked and sacked Meerut in 1399. The city was held by Ilyas Afghan and his son Maula Muhammad Thaneswari, who were assisted by non-Muslims led by Safi. Timur tried to negotiate a surrender, but the inhabitants of the fort replied saying that Tarmashirin had tried to capture the city in the past, but failed. Incensed, Timur attacked the city with 10,000 cavalry. The forces scaled the walls and Safi was killed in the battle. The inhabitants were killed and their wives and children were enslaved. The fortifications and houses were razed to the ground, and the prisoners were ordered to be flayed alive.

The city then came under the rule of the Mughal Empire and saw a period of relative tranquility. During the rule of Mughal Emperor Akbar (r. 1556–1605), there was a mint producing copper coins in the city. During the reign of Akbar, Meerut was listed in the Ain-i-Akbari as a pargana under Delhi Sarkar, producing a revenue of 4,391,996 dams for the imperial treasury and supplying a force of 300 infantry and 100 cavalry.

A major part of Meerut was controlled by Sayyid jagirdars of Abdullapur, from 16th to late 18th century. Sayyed Mir Abdulla Naqvi Al Bukhari built Kot Fort in Abdullapur in 16th century, and it became his main residence. The descendants of Syed Sadarudin Shah Kabir Naqvi Al Kannauji Bukhari are still present in Meerut; Sadarudin was a chief advisor of Sikandar Lodi and the father of saint Shah Jewna. The famous Pakistani writer Syed Qudrat Naqvi Al Bukhari was born in Meerut.

Nawab Mansab Ali Khan was one of the most influential personalities of Meerut; he built the famous Karbala and Masjid, known as Mansabiya, in 1882.

The city saw Sikh and Maratha invasions in the 18th century, with interruptions by Taga Brahman and Rohillas. Walter Reinhardt, a European soldier, established himself at Sardhana, and some parts of the district came under his rule. Upon his death, these areas came into the hands of Begum Samru. During this time, the southern part of the district had remained under Maratha rule.

=== Colonial era ===
In 1803, with the fall of Delhi, Daulat Rao Scindia of the Marathas ceded the territory to the British East India Company (EIC). The cantonment of Meerut was established in 1806 due to its proximity to Delhi and its location in the fertile Ganga–Yamuna Doab region. The city was made headquarters of the eponymous district in 1818.

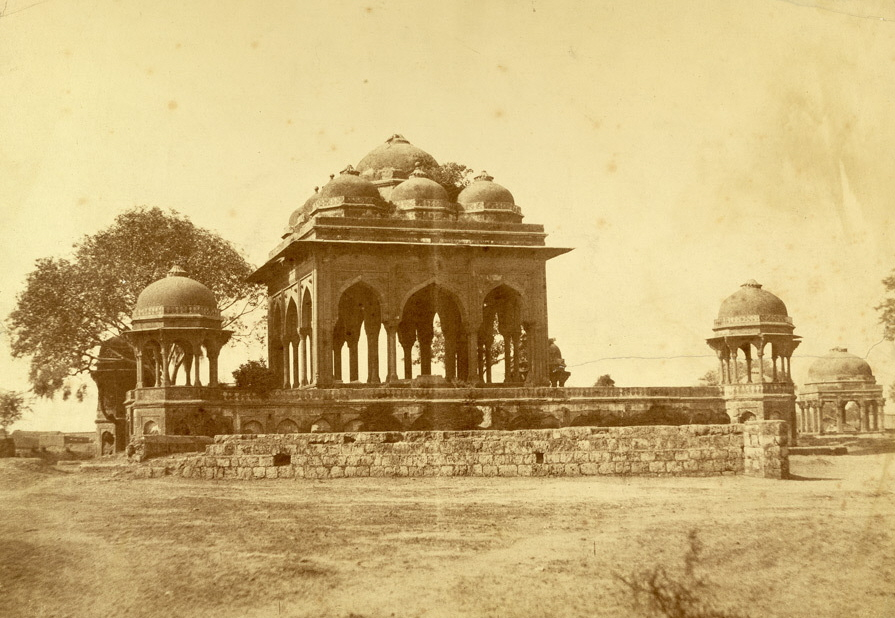
1857 Mutineers' Mosque

Meerut is often associated with the 1857 rebellion against Company rule in India. The slogan "Dilli Chalo" ("Let's march to Delhi!") was first spoken in the city, and the Meerut cantonment was the place where the rebellion started. Another name for Meerut is "Kranti Dhara," or "the land of revolution," denoting the place where India's independence movement began.

The revolt, which catapulted Meerut into international prominence, began in March 1857 in Barrackpore, Bengal. Indian sepoy Mangal Pandey shot at two of his commanding officers, missed, then attempted suicide. He was later executed. By April, Pandey's uprising had spread across North India and reached Meerut, which was then the second-largest East India Company garrison. Here, Europeans and native sepoys were evenly balanced, with a little more than 2,000 on each side. The European cantonment was separated from the Indian one. Sadar Bazar and Lal Kurti Bazar were close by, the latter named after the red uniforms worn by the Presidency armies. On 24 April 1857, Meerut's commander, Colonel Carmichael Smyth, paraded 90 Indian sepoys of the Bengal Cavalry, most of whom had come from Uttar Pradesh and Bihar. He ordered the soldiers to fire the new Enfield cartridges they had been supplied with. The cartridges were covered with paper that had to be torn off, and Muslim soldiers believed the paper was greased with pig fat (pigs in religion) and Hindus thought it was greased with cow fat (cows in Hinduism). Thus, they refused to touch them when ordered to.

All 85 soldiers were stripped of their uniforms, and court-martialed; they were all sentenced to a decade in prison. The prisoners, who were upper-class members of a cavalry regiment, were shocked at the harsh sentences handed down to them. On 10 May 1857, Kotwal Dhan Singh opened the gates of the prison. These soldiers, along with the other imprisoned soldiers, escaped prison and declared themselves free. They proceeded to mutiny, attack, and kill several Company officials in the city to bring it under their control. This marked the beginning of a widespread revolt across northern India, as the soldiers marched towards Delhi. 10 May is celebrated as a local holiday in Meerut.

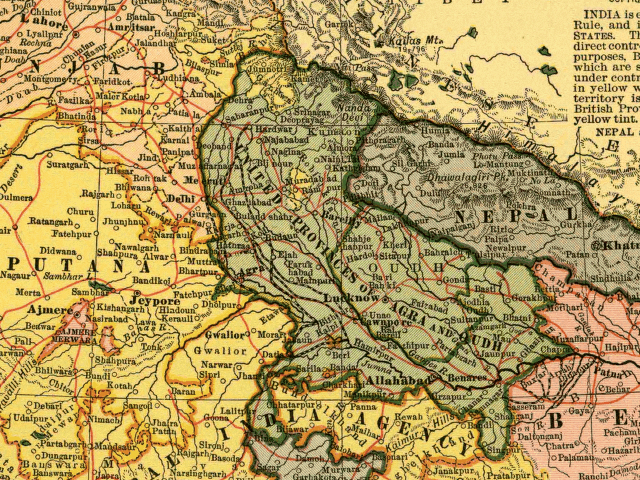
The United Provinces in 1903.

Meerut was also the venue of the Meerut Conspiracy Case in March 1929, in which several trade unionists, including three Englishmen, were arrested by the colonial authorities for organising a railway strike action. The case quickly became the subject of attention in England, inspiring a 1932 play titled Meerut Prisoners by left-wing Manchester street theatre group the Red Megaphones, which highlighted the detrimental effects of capitalism and industrialisation. Electricity was first introduced to Meerut in 1931. In the 1940s, during the height of the Indian independence movement, cinema-goers in Meerut had an unofficial policy of refusing to stand up when God Save the King played before the film was shown. The last session of the Indian National Congress (INC) before the independence of India in 1947, was held at Victoria Park in Meerut on 26 November 1946. It was in this session that the Constitution-making committee was constituted.

=== Post-independence era ===
The city and district also suffered from communal Hindu-Sikh riots in 1984 and Hindu-Muslim riots in 1982. In May 1987, the Hashimpura massacre occurred when personnel of the Provincial Armed Constabulary (PAC) shot and killed 42 Muslims; the trial of the case is still pending. In 2006, a fire at a consumer electronics "Brand India" fair in Victoria Park Stadium killed at least 100 people, with authorities confirming 45 fatalities, although a specific figure on a toll was difficult to determine and was believed to be much higher.

== Geography ==
Meerut district in Uttar Pradesh

Meerut lies between the plains of the Ganges and the Yamuna in the Doab region. By land area, Meerut district covers 2,522km^{2} (974 sq mi), which is larger than Delhi (1,484km^{2} [573 sq mi]).

=== Climate ===
Meerut

Climate chart (precipitation, max. and min. temperature)
J	F	M	A	M	J	J	A	S	O	N	D
20 19 7	32 23 10	24 29 14	16 36 19	29 38 23	82 37 25	226 34 26	218 33 25	119 33 24	16 32 18	1.4 27 12	4.9 22 8
- █ Average max. and min. temperatures in °C
- █ Precipitation totals in mm
Imperial conversion
J	F	M	A	M	J	J	A	S	O	N	D
0.8 66 44	1.3 73 50	1 84 58	0.6 97 67	1.1 101 74	3.2 98 78	8.9 93 78	8.6 92 77	4.7 92 74	0.6 90 64	0.1 81 53	0.2 72 46
- █ Average max. and min. temperatures in °F
- █ Precipitation totals in inches

Meerut has a monsoon influenced humid subtropical climate characterised by hot summers and cooler winters. Summers last from early April to late June and are extremely hot, with temperatures reaching up to 49 °C (120 °F).

The monsoon arrives in late June and continues till the middle of September. Temperatures drop slightly, with increased cloud cover and higher humidity. Temperatures rise again in October and the city then has a mild, dry winter season from November to the middle of March. The lowest temperature ever recorded is −0.4 °C (31.3 °F), on 6 January 2013. The rainfall averages about 845 millimetres (33 in) per annum, which is suitable for crop cultivation. Most of the rainfall is received during the monsoon. The humidity varies from 30 to 100%.

Meerut has been ranked 25th best "National Clean Air City" (under Category 1 >10 lakh population cities) in India according to 'Swachh Vayu Survekshan 2024 Results.

Climate data for Meerut (1991–2020)
Month	Jan	Feb	Mar	Apr	May	Jun	Jul	Aug	Sep	Oct	Nov	Dec	Year
Record high °C (°F)	29.3 (84.7)	32.2 (90.0)	39.5 (103.1)	43.8 (110.8)	45.8 (114.4)	46.1 (115.0)	46.0 (114.8)	40.0 (104.0)	39.0 (102.2)	38.0 (100.4)	34.5 (94.1)	30.0 (86.0)	46.1 (115.0)
Mean daily maximum °C (°F)	19.0 (66.2)	22.9 (73.2)	28.7 (83.7)	36.0 (96.8)	38.4 (101.1)	36.6 (97.9)	33.7 (92.7)	33.1 (91.6)	33.1 (91.6)	32.2 (90.0)	27.2 (81.0)	22.0 (71.6)	30.3 (86.5)
Daily mean °C (°F)	12.9 (55.2)	16.4 (61.5)	21.5 (70.7)	27.6 (81.7)	30.9 (87.6)	31.0 (87.8)	29.7 (85.5)	29.1 (84.4)	28.3 (82.9)	24.9 (76.8)	19.5 (67.1)	14.9 (58.8)	23.9 (75.0)
Mean daily minimum °C (°F)	6.9 (44.4)	9.9 (49.8)	14.2 (57.6)	19.2 (66.6)	23.4 (74.1)	25.4 (77.7)	25.7 (78.3)	25.1 (77.2)	23.5 (74.3)	17.5 (63.5)	11.8 (53.2)	7.8 (46.0)	17.5 (63.5)
Record low °C (°F)	−0.4 (31.3)	0.1 (32.2)	5.4 (41.7)	8.3 (46.9)	15.4 (59.7)	17.7 (63.9)	16.5 (61.7)	18.5 (65.3)	15.7 (60.3)	7.2 (45.0)	1.8 (35.2)	0.2 (32.4)	−0.4 (31.3)
Average precipitation mm (inches)	20.1 (0.79)	32.2 (1.27)	24.2 (0.95)	15.7 (0.62)	28.7 (1.13)	81.9 (3.22)	226.4 (8.91)	217.9 (8.58)	119.1 (4.69)	16.4 (0.65)	1.4 (0.06)	4.9 (0.19)	788.9 (31.06)
Average rainy days	1.5	1.9	1.8	1.2	2.1	4.4	9.0	9.0	5.4	0.9	0.2	0.5	37.8
Average relative humidity (%)	64	55	48	34	35	51	71	73	69	59	58	62	56
Source: India Meteorological Department (record high and low up to 2012)

== Administration ==
=== General administration ===
The Meerut division consists of six districts, and is headed by the Divisional Commissioner of Meerut, who is a senior IAS officer. The Commissioner is the head of local government institutions (including Municipal Corporations) in the division, and is in charge of infrastructural development in their division. The District Magistrate of Meerut reports to the Divisional Commissioner. The current Commissioner is Mr. Surendra Singh, IAS .

The Meerut district administration is headed by the District Magistrate of Meerut, who is an IAS officer. The DM is in charge of property records and revenue collection for the central government and oversees the elections held in the city. The district is subdivided into three tehsils, namely Meerut, Mawana and Sardhana, each headed by a Sub-Divisional Magistrate. The tehsils are further divided into 12 blocks. The current District Magistrate of Meerut is Dr. Vijay Kumar Singh.

=== Police administration ===
The Meerut district comes under the Meerut police zone and the Meerut police range of Uttar Pradesh Police. The Meerut zone is headed by an IPS officer of the rank of Additional Director General of Police (ADG), whereas the Meerut range is headed by an IPS officer of the rank of Inspector General of Police (IG). Currently, Bhanu Bhaskar is the ADG of the Meerut Zone and Praveen Kumar is the current IG of the Meerut range.

The District Police of Meerut is headed by the Senior Superintendent of Police (SSP) who is an IPS officer. He is assisted by four Superintendents of Police (SP)/Additional Superintendent of Police (Addl. SP) (City, Rural Area, Traffic and Crime). The Meerut district is divided into numerous police circles, each headed by a Circle Officer of the rank of Deputy Superintendent of Police. SP (Traffic) and SP (Crime) are assisted by one Circle Officer of the rank of Deputy Superintendent of Police. The current SSP is Avinash Pandey.

=== Infrastructure and civic administration ===
The development of infrastructure in the city is overseen by the Meerut Development Authority (MDA), which comes under the Housing Department of Uttar Pradesh government. The Divisional Commissioner of Meerut acts as the ex-officio Chairman of MDA, whereas a vice-chairman, a government-appointed IAS officer, looks after the daily matters of the authority. The current vice-chairman of Meerut Development Authority is Sanjay Kumar Meena.

The city is administered by Meerut Municipal Corporation, which is responsible for performing civic administrative functions administered by the Municipal Commissioner (PCS Officer) whereas the Mayor is the ceremonial head of the corporation. The current Municipal Commissioner of Meerut Municipal Corporation is Saurabh Gangwar.

=== Municipal finance ===
According to financial data published on the CityFinance Portal of the Ministry of Housing and Urban Affairs, the Meerut Municipal Corporation reported total revenue receipts of ₹430 crore (US$52 million) and total expenditure of ₹353 crore (US$42 million) in 2022–23. Tax revenue accounted for about 10.5% of the total revenue, while the corporation received ₹382 crore in grants during the financial year.

=== Central government offices ===
The office of the Chief Commissioner, Customs and Central Excise, Meerut Zone, has jurisdiction over 13 districts of Uttarakhand and 14 districts of Uttar Pradesh. This jurisdiction was carved out of the Lucknow Zone. It comprises the erstwhile Customs and Central Excise Commissioners of Meerut and Noida. The Meerut Commissionerate was bifurcated into two Commissionerates, namely, 'Meerut-I and Ghaziabad' and the Noida Commissionerate was bifurcated into 'Noida and Meerut-II'. In addition, the jurisdiction of Central Excise Division Bareilly was included in the jurisdiction of Meerut-II Commissionerate.

The CGHS department of Meerut provides comprehensive health care facilities for central government employees and pensioners and their dependents residing in the city.

=== District management ===
- The Jani Khurd block is established on 1 October 1962.
- The Rohta block is established on 1 October 1959.
- The Daurala block is established on 1 October 1962.
- The Rajpura block is established on 1 October 1959.
- The Kharkhoda block is established on 1 October 1959.
- The Mawana block is established on 1 April 1957.
- The Meerut block is established on 1 April 1957.
- The Hastinapur block is established on 1 April 1963.
- The Sardhana block is established on 26 January 1955.
- The Saroorpur Khurd block is established on 1 April 1959.
- The Machchhara block is established on 1 October 1961.
- The Parikshitgarh block is established on 1 April 1958.

=== Demand for High Court bench in Meerut ===
Almost 54% of all cases reaching the Allahabad High Court of Uttar Pradesh originate from the 22 districts of western Uttar Pradesh, but western Uttar Pradesh does not have a High Court bench. People must travel 700km away to Allahabad for hearings. Six high courts (Shimla, Delhi, Jaipur, Chandigarh, Nainital, Jammu) from other states are closer than Allahabad from western Uttar Pradesh. Western Uttar Pradesh has been advocating to have a high court bench in Meerut so that Western Uttar Pradesh can get access to judicial services. The bench in the western part of the state was first proposed by the government in 1955.

== Meerut Cantonment ==
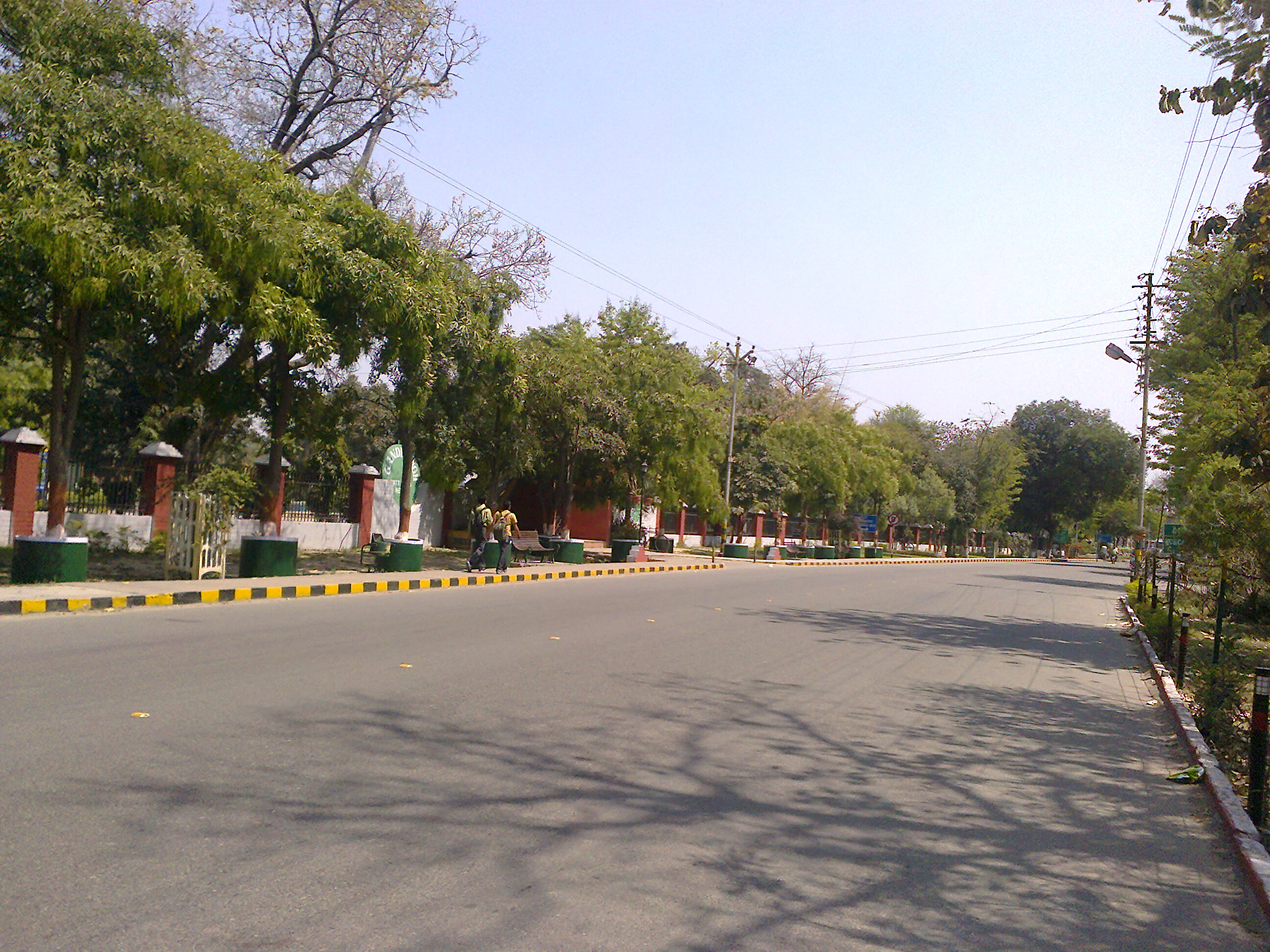
Mall Road in Meerut Cantonment.

Meerut Cantonment was established by the British East India Company in 1803 after the Battle of Laswari. It is one of the largest cantonments of India both in land area 3,568.06 hectares (35.68 km^{2}) and population (93,684 (civil + military) people) as per the 2011 census. The Revolt of 1857 began in "Kali Paltan" in Meerut Cantonment and Indian soldiers stationed here actively participated in the rebellion. The cantonment surrounds the old city from 3 sides – from Pallavpuram to Sainik Vihar to Ganga Nagar. It is well connected with the rest of country by roads as well as by rail. The Delhi-Niti Pass Road (State Highway No. 45) passes through Meerut Cantonment. Meerut cantonment was the divisional headquarters of the 7th (Meerut) Division of the British Indian Army from 1829 to 1920.

== Economy ==
=== Development ===
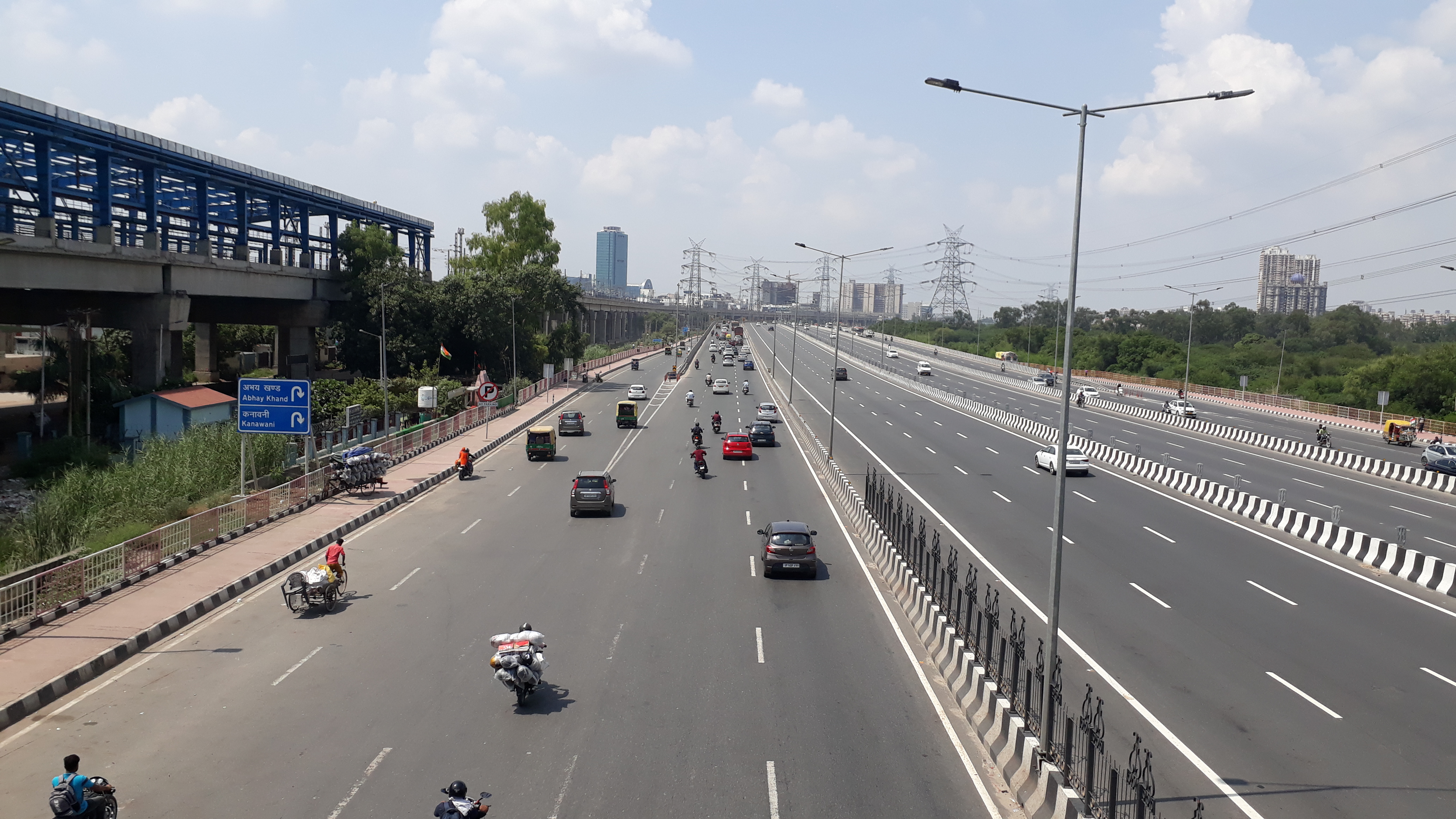
Delhi–Meerut Expressway

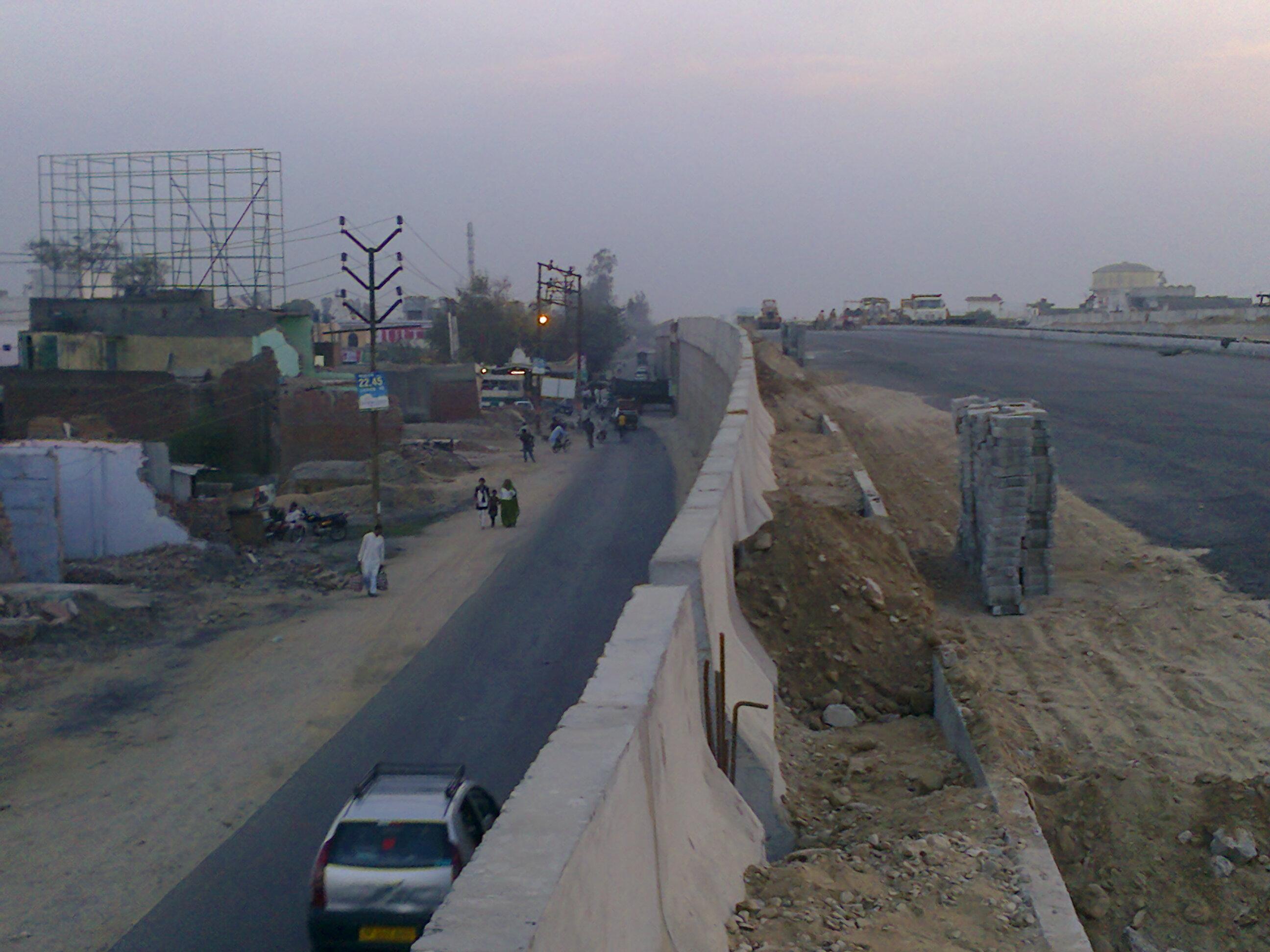
Atop an under-construction overpass.

Meerut is the 63rd-fastest-growing urban area in the world. It is the fastest developing city in Uttar Pradesh, after Noida and Ghaziabad. According to a June 2011 report by US financial services firm Morgan Stanley gave Meerut the 5th spot on the "vibrancy" index, ahead of Delhi and Mumbai. The city ranked second on both the financial penetration index, which measures things like the presence of ATMs and bank branches, and on the consumption index, indicating the city's transformation into an urban town. Notably, western Uttar Pradesh accounts for 51.71% of state GDP.

While the city ranked in the bottom 10 in job creation, the report suggests that overall there are plenty of signs of "potential for urbanization" including future employment opportunities. The infrastructure segment of Meerut is currently going through a boom phase with many new projects like Expressways, Metro, Freight corridors coming up in and around the city. The Upper Ganga Canal Expressway development has also been completed. On the India City Competitiveness Index, the city ranked 46th in 2017. It is India's largest refined sugar producer.

Meerut is a prospective Logistic Hub in western Uttar Pradesh due to projects like Eastern Dedicated Freight Corridor and expressway projects like - Delhi Meerut Expressway, Ganga Expressway, Delhi Meerut RRTS.

=== Industry ===
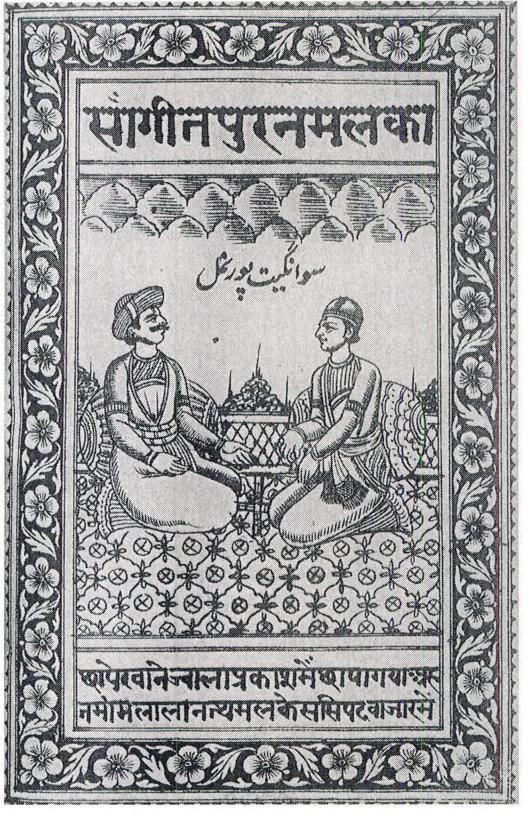
The cover of the book Sangeet Puranmal Ka (lit. The Music of Puranmal) by Ramlal. The book was published in 1879 from the city.

Meerut is one of the important industrial towns of western Uttar Pradesh with several traditional and modern industries. It is traditionally known for handloom works and scissors industry (Meerut scissors). Meerut was one of the first cities in northern India where publishing was set up during the 19th century. It was a major center of commercial publishing during the 1860s and 1870s.

Meerut is a rich agricultural area, being in proximity of Delhi, it is ideal for industry. As of 2011, it is home to 520 micro, small, and medium-scale industries. As of August 2006, Meerut has about 23,471 industrial units, including 15,510 small-scale units and 7,922 cottage industries. Sanspareils Greenlands (SG), Sareen Sports (SS) and BDM one of India's biggest sports goods manufacturers are based out of Meerut.

Existing industries in the city include tyres, textiles, transformers, sugar, distillery, chemical, engineering, paper, publishing, and sports goods manufacturing. Prospective industries include IT and ITES, Logistics.

Meerut is one of two centres of sports goods manufacturing in India – the other being Jalandhar. There are numerous sports companies in the city especially for cricket namely SS, SF, SG, RM Sports, BDM, GEM etc. Players like MS Dhoni, Virender Sehwag, Yuvraj Singh, Kieron Pollard, Virat Kohli, Kumar Sangakkara and many others have used bats made in Meerut. The 40,000-capacity Kailash Prakash Stadium is located in Meerut.

Uttar Pradesh State Industrial Development Corporation (UPSIDC) has two industrial estates in the city, namely Partapur and Udyog Puram.

== Transport ==
=== Road ===
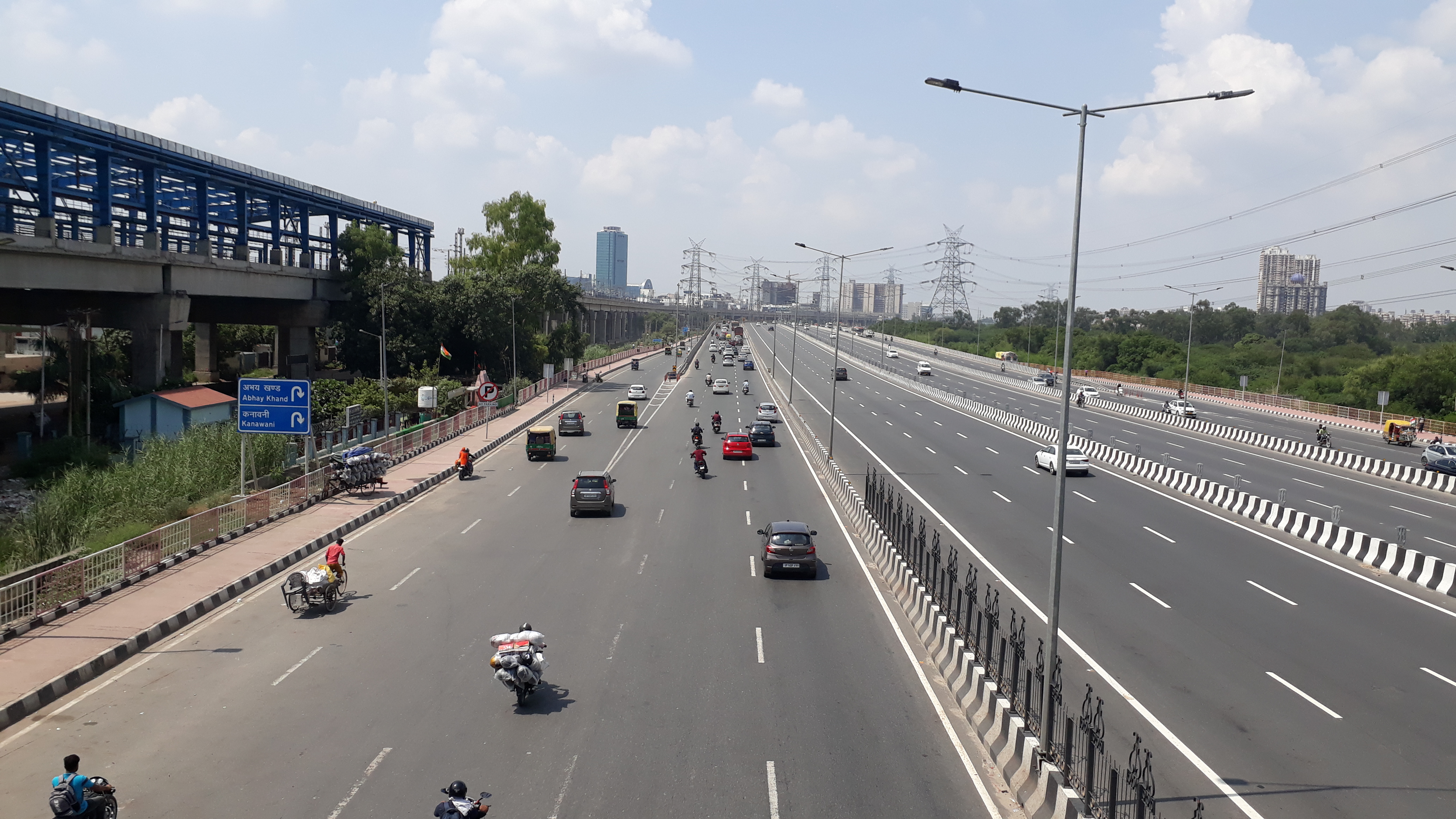
Delhi-Meerut expressway

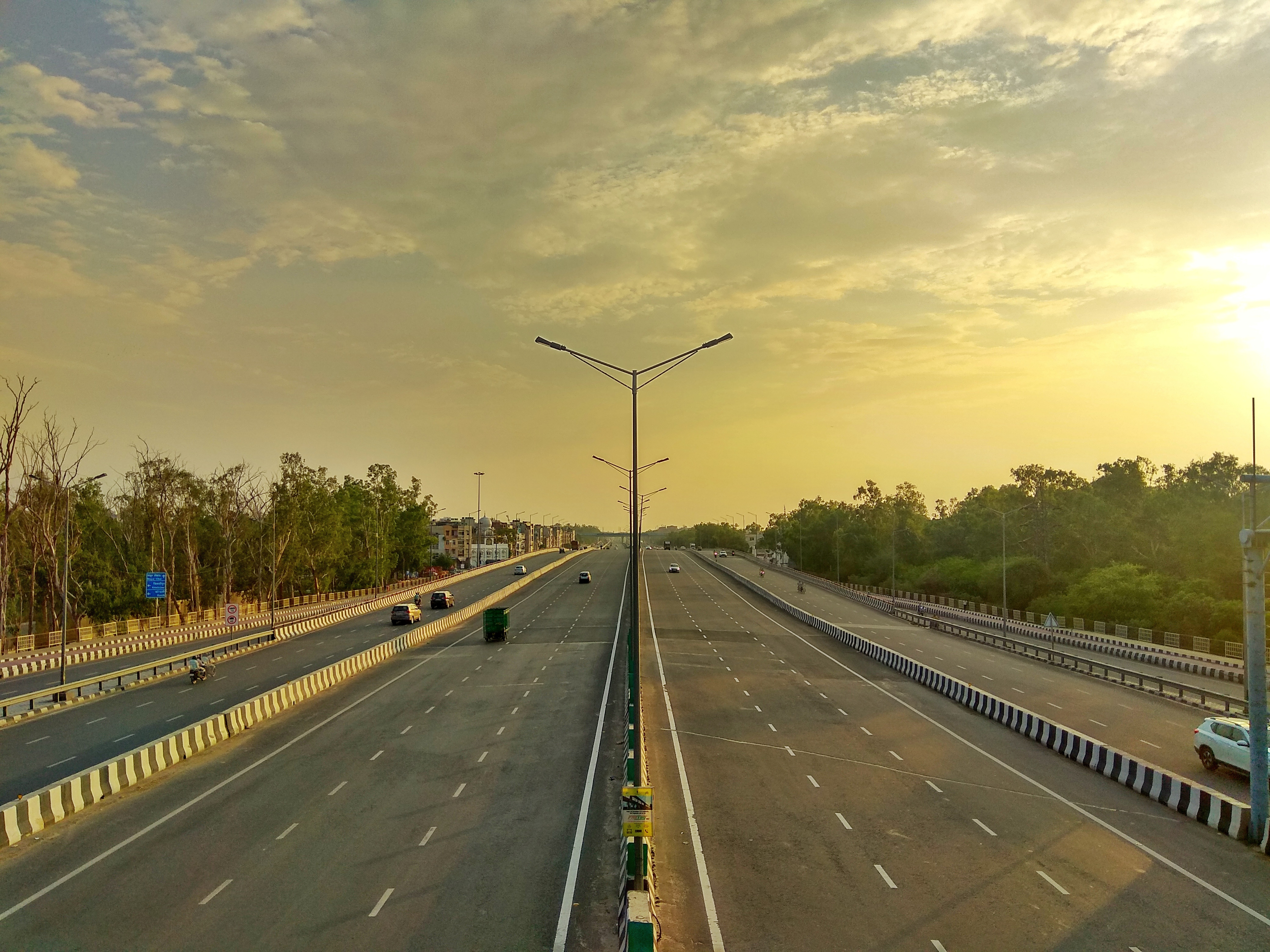
Delhi–Meerut Expressway

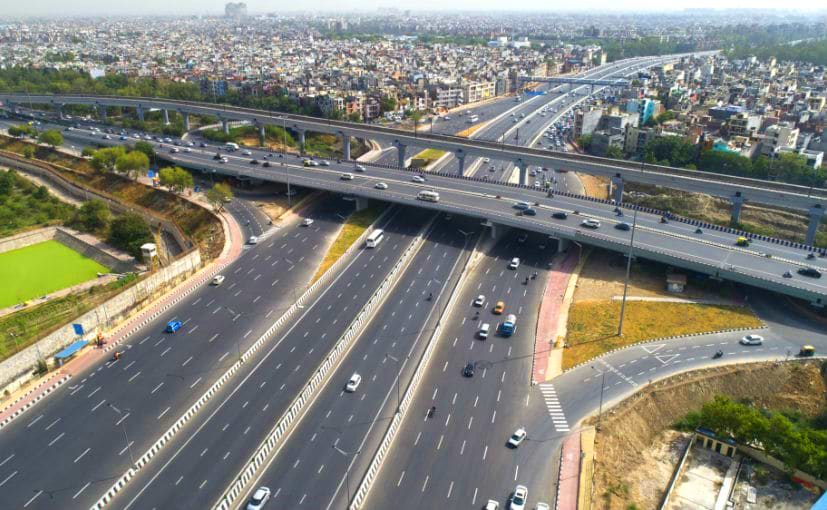
Delhi–Meerut Expressway

Meerut is well-connected by road to major cities like Delhi, Noida, Faridabad, Ghaziabad, Haridwar, Bulandshahr, etc. A large number of people commute to Delhi, Noida, Greater Noida, and Ghaziabad every day for work.

Three national highways (NH-58, NH-119 & NH-235) and two expressways pass through Meerut. The Delhi–Meerut Expressway - a 90 km long controlled-access expressway connects Meerut with Delhi via Dasna in Ghaziabad district. Prime Minister Narendra Modi laid the foundation stone for the expressway on 31 December 2015, and the expressway was completed and opened for public on 1 April 2021, also an under construction Ganga Expressway.

There are two main bus terminals, namely Bhainsali bus terminal and Sohrab Gate bus terminal from where Uttar Pradesh State Road Transport Corporation (UPSRTC) buses travel to cities all over the state and all nearby cities. A JNNURM scheme was put in place. Low Floor city buses (under JNNURM), normal city buses, auto rickshaws, and rickshaws are convenient public transport options to commute within the city.

Many new transport infrastructure projects like the inner ring road, outer ring road and construction of new flyovers are proposed and being made as well. The under-construction Ganga Expressway will start from Meerut till Allahabad, and in the future, it will be extended from Meerut to Haridwar. Other expressways that will pass nearby Meerut are the Upper Ganga Canal Expressway, Delhi–Saharanpur–Dehradun Expressway and Gorakhpur–Shamli Expressway.

==== Expressways ====
Since Meerut has a very favourable location for industries and is suitable for being a logistics hub, it has many expressways like Delhi Meerut Expressway, Ganga Expressway. It also is nearby (within 30 miles) of other expressways like Delhi Mumbai Expressway, Yamuna Expressway, KMP Expressway, and Eastern Peripheral Expressway.

=== Railways ===
Meerut lies on the Delhi–Meerut–Saharanpur line, and has four railway stations: Meerut City, Meerut Cantt., Partapur and Pabli Khas. Meerut City railway station is the busiest. The railway line between Delhi and Meerut was constructed in 1864, and the Meerut Cantt station, which serves as a secondary railway station, was founded in 1865.

About 20,000 passengers travel daily to Delhi and back. Around 27 pairs of trains run between Meerut and Delhi, and four between Meerut and Khurja. Two trains are available for Lucknow daily, namely Nauchandi Express and Rajya Rani Express. A weekly train goes to Chennai and Kochuveli. Daily trains connect Meerut to Mumbai, Ahmedabad, Jaipur, Rajkot and many cities in other states.

==== Eastern Dedicated Freight Corridor ====
Eastern Dedicated Freight Corridor or Eastern DFC is a broad gauge freight corridor in India. The railway will run between Ludhiana in Punjab and Dankuni (near Kolkata) in West Bengal via Meerut and Khurja in Uttar Pradesh.

Apart from this, Delhi Meerut RRTS (RapidX) will also be used for inter-city cargo movement. Vinay Kumar Singh, managing director of NCRTC said, "During non-peak hours, the ridership would be low, so we can use the time to move cargo, including perishable goods."

Uttar Pradesh government has allocated land for building a large logistic hub in Modipuram region of Uttar Pradesh.

==== Metro project ====
On 30 December 2014, the Uttar Pradesh Cabinet approved the proposed metro rail project in Meerut, to boost the urban mass transport infrastructure in the city. The state government nominated RITES Limited and Uttar Pradesh Metro Rail Corporation (UPMRC) to prepare the respective detailed project report (DPR) and as a coordinator, respectively. The development authorities are nodal agencies for the DPR.

The metro project got approval from the divisional commissioner. It was decided in the meeting that the project would be along two corridors, by dividing the project into two phases – Phase I from Partapur to Pallavpuram, and Phase II from Rajban Market to Gokalpur village. The main stations on the first corridor in the first phase will be Partapur, Panchwati Enclave, Rithani, Rithani West, Shatabdi Nagar, Devlok, Madhavpuram, Meerut Railway Station Road, Lajpat Bazaar, Begampul, Gandhi Bagh, Lekha Nagar, Pallavpuram Dorli, Ansal City and Pallavpuram. While in the second phase, the corridor in the Partapur-Pallavpuram route will cover 20 km and will have a total number of 18 stations in between, the 10 km-long route from Rajban Market to Gokalpur village will have nine stations.

==== Regional Rapid Transit System (RRTS) ====
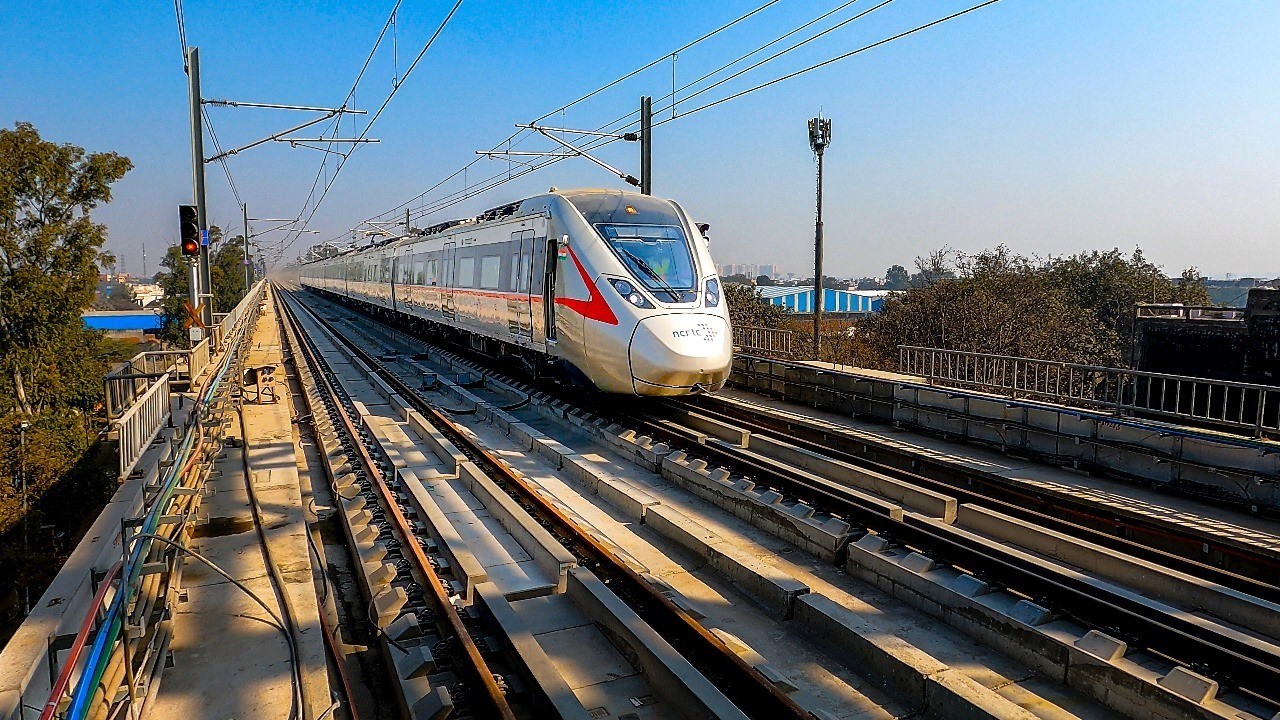
Meerut Metro trainset

The NCR Transport Plan 2021 proposed a rail-based mass transit system, called the Regional Rapid Transit System (RRTS) between Delhi to Meerut, with the Shahdara-Ghaziabad section scheduled for construction during 2001-11, and the Ghaziabad-Meerut section scheduled for 2011–21.

In September 2010, the RRTS was reported to be proposed between Anand Vihar and Meerut with the project in its initial stages. The cost was projected to be around ₹1,000 crore (US$110 million) with the expected time of the journey being 45 minutes. In November 2010, the train speed was proposed to be between 130 and 160 kmph, with stations at Anand Vihar, Sahibabad, Mohan Nagar, Ghaziabad, Guldhar, Duhai, Moradnagar, Modinagar, Meerut South, Shatabdi Nagar, Meerut Centre, Begumpul, Meerut North, Pallavpuram being the stops.

On 14 December 2010, the NCR Planning Board, Meerut Development Authority (MDA), and Meerut Municipal Corporation approved the project. In August 2011, it was reported that the project tender had been awarded to Delhi Integrated Multi-Modal Transit System (DIMTS). The proposed system was to have dedicated trains between Anand Vihar and Meerut, with no stops in between, and trains that will stop at stations will be constructed after a gap of 4–5 km. The reported stations were Anand Vihar, Vaishali, Mohan Nagar, Meerut Road (Airtel Cut), Morta, Duhai, Muradnagar, Gang Nahar, Modinagar, Mohiuddinpur, Meerut Bypass Cut and Pallavpuram, with completion expected in 2017. The track between Anand Vihar to Dabur was proposed to be underground with the rest of the track overhead.

On 11 July 2013, the Union Cabinet of India approved the formation of the National Capital Region Transport Corporation Limited (NCRTCL), with a seed capital of ₹100 crore (US$11 million). The corporation will take up the construction of the 90 km-long Delhi-Ghaziabad-Meerut corridor on a priority basis (along with two other corridors) with planned completion in 2016. It was reported that the Detailed Project Reports (DPRs) for the three corridors were under the process of finalisation.

In December 2013, problems were reported in the proposed alignment of the Delhi-Meerut corridor. In January 2014, it was reported that the proposed alignment had to be changed due to objections by NHAI and the feasibility report had to be prepared again. The new proposed alignment increased the length from 90 km to 106 km.

In March 2018, the project's construction was started after the foundation stone was laid by Prime Minister, Narendra Modi. As of 2023, the alignment is 82 km (51 mi) long, and the 17 km first stretch, as the priority corridor, from Sahibabad to Duhai is almost completed, and will be opened by March 2023, while the next stretch till Meerut South will be completed by the first quarter of 2024. The entire corridor will be completed by March 2025. As of February 2026, the Meerut Metro, integrated with the Delhi–Meerut Regional Rapid Transit System (RRTS), is operational. The system is part of India's first regional rapid transit network, also known as Namo Bharat.

=== Air ===
The nearest airport is Hindon Airport at Ghaziabad, located 64 km (40 mi) away, while the major airport, Indira Gandhi International Airport at Delhi is about 100 km (62 mi) away.

The Dr. Bhim Rao Ambedkar Airport is located at Partapur. It was proposed by the state government that the airstrip be converted to an international airport to reduce pressure on Delhi Airport. However, plans to expand the Domestic airport were called off after protests against land acquisition started in other parts of the state. Following an accident in May 2012, the city administration barred private flights from using the airstrip.

The city has long demanded an airport. However, the government has stalled the project multiple times due to land acquisition reasons and project costs. Even Ajit Singh, the minister of civil aviation announced the project, but the project was not completed. BJP MP Rajendra Agarwal met Civil Aviation Minister Jyotiraditya Scindia ministerwho promised that the Ministry of Civil Aviation will begin running the airport as soon as the Uttar Pradesh government satisfied the demand for land. As of October 2023, the project is awaiting approval for land acquisition from Uttar Pradesh Government.

== Demographics ==
Religions in Meerut City (2011)
Religion	Percent
Hinduism	61.15%
Islam	36.05%
Jainism	0.92%
Sikhism	0.60%
Christian	0.41%
Others†	0.96%
Distribution of religions †Includes Buddhists (<0.09%).

According to the 2011 census, the Meerut Urban Agglomeration (Meerut UA) has a population of around 1.42 million, (comparable to the kingdom of Bahrain or Trinidad and Tobago) with the municipality contributing roughly 1.31 million of it. The Meerut Urban Agglomeration consists of area falling under Meerut Municipal Corporation, Meerut Cantonment Board and four census towns of Sindhawali, Amehra Adipur, Aminagar Urf Bhurbaral and Mohiuddinpur. This makes Meerut the 33rd most populous urban agglomeration and the 28th most populous city in India. The sex ratio in Meerut UA is 897, lower than the state average of 908; while the child sex ratio is 895, lower than the state average of 899. 12.99% of the population is under six years of age. The overall literacy rate is 88.29%, higher than the state average of 69.72%. In Meerut Municipal Corporation, 83.78% of the population spoke Hindi and 15.25% Urdu as their first language.

As of 2017, Meerut ranks 328 (based on population), 189 (based on population density), 648 (based on built-up area) among the world's urban areas.

According to the 2001 census, the city ranked second in terms of population in NCR and 25th in India.

Demographics of Meerut Metropolitan area (Meerut UA) (Census 2011, updated)
Metropolis	City/Town/Village (Note: M Corp. = Municipal Corporation, NP = Nagar panchayat, NPP = Nagar Palika Parishad, CB = Cantonment Board, CT = Census Town)	Population			Sex Ratio	Literacy Rate (Note: For literacy rate, the population aged 7 and above only is considered in India.)		
Metropolis	City/Town/Village	Male	Female	Total	Sex Ratio	Male	Female	Total
Meerut UA	Meerut (CB)	53024	40288	93,312	760	87.99%	79.48%	84.33%
Meerut UA	Meerut (M Corp.)	688118	617311	1,305,429	897	80.97%	69.79%	75.66%
Meerut UA	Mohiuddinpur (CT)	2811	2389	5,200	850	89.17%	69.63%	80.13%
Meerut UA	Aminagar Urf Bhurbaral (CT)	3314	2827	6,141	853	91.01%	69.68%	81.02%
Meerut UA	Amehra Adipur (CT)	2844	2641	5,485	929	85.68%	68.05%	77.14%
Meerut UA	Sindhawali (CT)	2782	2553	5,335	918	79.92%	64.44%	72.53%
Meerut UA - Total		752,893	668,009	1,420,902	887	81.57 %	70.36 %	76.28 %

Historical Population Statistics (Note: Includes municipality and cantonment populations)
Year	Male	Female	Total	Growth
1847	NA	NA	29,014	
1853	NA	NA	82,035	182.74%
1872	NA	NA	81,386	-0.79%
1881	NA	NA	99,565	22.34%
1891	NA	NA	119,390	19.91%
1901	65,822 (55.53%)	52,717 (44.47%)	118,539	-0.71%
1911	66,542 (57.05%)	50,089 (42.95%)	116,631	-1.6%
1921	71,816 (58.57%)	50,793 (41.43%)	122,609	5.12%
1931	80,073 (58.57%)	56,636 (41.43%)	136,709	11.49%
1941	98,829 (58.38%)	70,461 (41.62%)	169,290	23.83%
1951	133,094 (57.08%)	100,089 (42.92%)	233,183	37.74%
1961	157,572 (55.48%)	126,425 (44.52%)	283,997	21.79%

Meerut Urban Agglomeration (Meerut UA) Population Statistics (Note: For Meerut Urban Agglomeration, includes municipality and cantonment populations and 4 census towns of Sindhawali, Amehra Adipur, Aminagar Urf Bhurbaral and Mohiuddinpur.)
Year	Male	Female	Total	Growth rate	Sex ratio (Note: In females per 1000 males)
2001	621,481 (53.50%)	540,235 (46.50%)	1,161,716	NA	NA
2011 (Note: Provisional Data was revised and finalized when govt. updated 2011 census data on 20 May 2013.)	752,893 (52.99%)	668,009 (47.01%)	1,420,902	22.31%	887

Literacy Rate (Percentage)
Year	Male	Female	Total
2001	65.22	53.17	59.62
2011	83.74 (+18.52)	72.19 (+19.02)	78.29 (+18.67)
2021	95.24 (+11.5)	84.69 (+12.5)	90.29 (+12)

Crime Rate in Meerut (Total cognisable crimes under IPC per lakh population)
Year	Rate in Meerut	Rate in UP	Rate in India
2011	305.5	97.8	192.2
2012	309.1	96.4	196.7
2013	368.5	108.4	215.5
2014	430.9	113.2	229.2
2015	408.6	112.1	234.2

== Culture ==
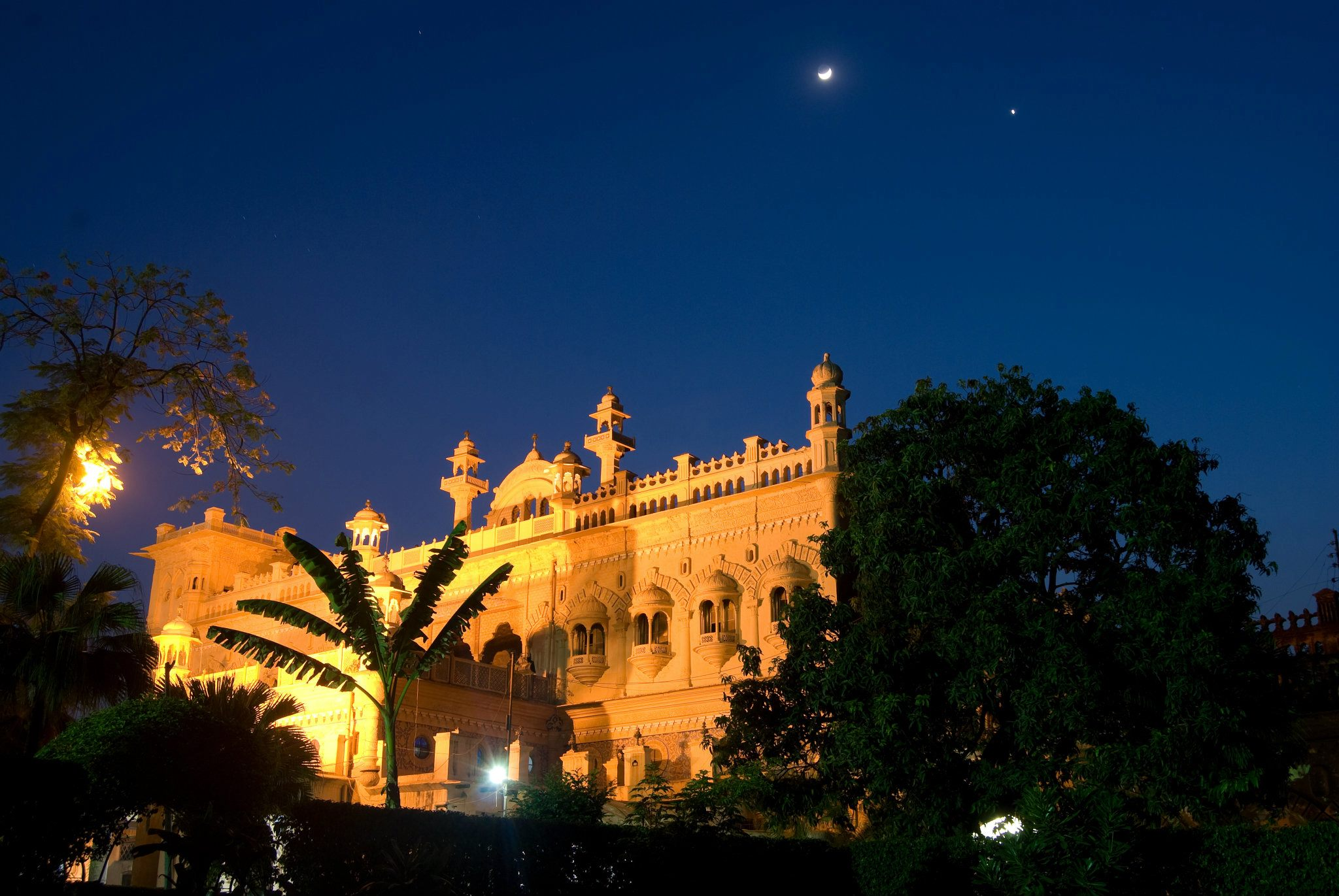
Mustafa Castle was built in 1900.

Many traditional Indian festivals, including Holi, Dussehra, Diwali, Eid are celebrated in Meerut. Notably, the Nauchandi Mela (Nauchandi Fair), which began in 1672, is held annually two weeks after Holi. The fair typically runs for approximately 15 days and attracts a large number of visitors. Events at the fair include poetry recitations in languages such as Hindi, Urdu and Punjabi.

Meerut’s cultural identity is closely linked to its traditional crafts, including the production of scissors and brass musical instruments. The granting of GI tags to Meerut scissors and the Meerut bugle highlights the city’s long-standing artisanal heritage and its contribution to India’s industrial and ceremonial traditions. Meerut’s bugle-making heritage dates back to the late 19th century, when the instrument became integral to battlefield communication and regimental drills under British rule, and later evolved into a symbol of discipline and ceremonial music across the Indian Army, paramilitary units, and police forces. The GI tag is expected to protect the authentic Meerut bugle from imitation, enhance market value, and support the livelihoods of local artisans by promoting their craft both nationally and internationally.

Meerut serves as the headquarters of the Roman Catholic Diocese of Meerut, which encompasses the districts of Meerut, Muzaffarnagar, Saharanpur, Dehradun, Haridwar, Moradabad, Rampur, Jyotiba Phule Nagar, Ghaziabad, Baghpat and the Dhampur tehsil of Bijnor district.

The cuisine of Meerut reflects influences from Punjabi, Awadhi, and Mughlai traditions. Local dishes commonly associated with the city include much of the vegetarian dishes and sweets as most of the population is vegetarian.

=== Nauchandi Mela ===
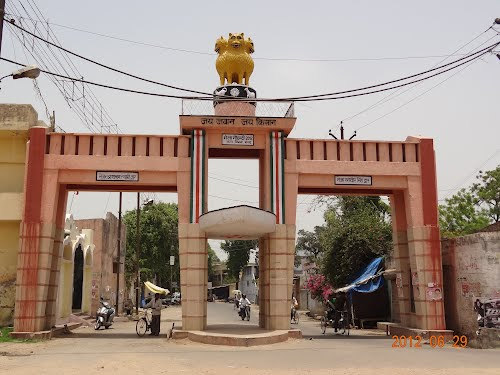
One of the entrance gates of Nauchandi Mela ground at Meerut.

The Nauchandi Mela is an annual fair held at Nauchandi Ground in Meerut. The fair stretches for about a month and is organised by the Municipal Corporation of Meerut. It generally starts from the second Sunday after Holi. The main exhibits are the artistic and religious rituals followed in rustic Uttar Pradesh. The fair witnesses more than 50,000 visitors every year. The Indian Railways' Nauchandi Express train is named after this fair.

The fair has a prominent history dating back several hundreds of years. It started in the year 1672 AD as a one-day cattle trading fair and has been held every year after, excluding 1858, the year after 1857 revolt, which started from Meerut.

Since then, cattle trading has been replaced by many other activities. The fair features shops for Lucknow's chikan work, Moradabad's brassware, Varanasi's carpets, rugs and silk sarees, Agra's footwear, Meerut's leather items, etc. Meerut's own products like sports goods, scissors, and confections like gajaks and nan-khatai are also sold. The fair features rides, wheels, circus performances and recreational activities remain a big attraction of the fair.

=== Film and television ===
Meerut is home to a film industry, which has a following in western Uttar Pradesh and Haryana. The films are usually folk tales, comedies, or localised versions of Bollywood hits. The films which have been shot here include Sonu Ke Titu Ki Sweety, Zero, and Rajma Chawal.

Notable people from Meerut in the film and television industry include Bharat Bhushan, Aziz Mian, Mandakini, Achint Kaur, Kailash Kher, Chitrangada Singh, Vishal Bhardwaj, Deepti Bhatnagar and Pravesh Rana.

== Education ==
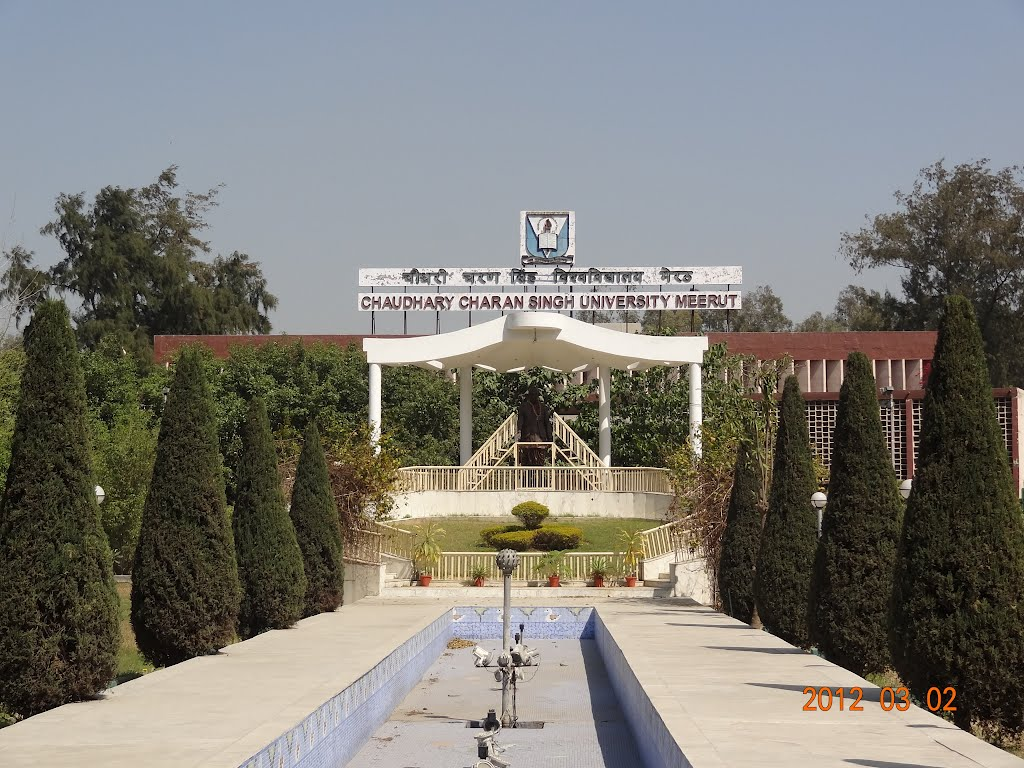
Chaudhary Charan Singh University (formerly Meerut University)

Meerut is an education hub of Western Uttar Pradesh with about four or five universities, approximately 50 engineering colleges, 23 management colleges, seven pharmacy colleges, four colleges offering hotel management, one college offering fashion design, over 150 academic colleges, and over 50 schools. The city is home to Chaudhary Charan Singh University (formerly Meerut University), Swami Vivekanand Subharti University and IIMT University (the oldest engineering institute in Meerut district, established in 1997). The city has one government-run engineering college, Sir Chhotu Ram Institute of Engineering and Technology, a constituent college of Chaudhary Charan Singh University. There are schools affiliated with recognised boards such as ICSE, CBSE, IB, and the state board. St. Mary's Academy, Meerut (a Patrician Brothers school) is a nationally top-ranked boys' school.

Chaudhary Charan Singh University (CCSU) is a public and state university that has many degree colleges affiliated with it. They fall into two divisions: Saharanpur and Meerut with nine districts including Saharanpur, Meerut, Muzaffarnagar, Ghaziabad, Shamli, Gautam Budh Nagar, Bagpat, Hapur and Bulandshahr administered by a vice-chancellor and a registrar (PCS officer). The city has three medical colleges: Lala Lajpat Rai Memorial Medical College, Subharti Medical College and Mulayam Singh Yadav Medical College & Hospital.

== Media ==
Meerut is becoming a media centre, as journalists from all over Uttar Pradesh and other Indian states are working in Meerut. Radio stations shared with Delhi are Radio City 91.1 MHz, Big FM 92.7 MHz, Red FM 93.5 MHz, Radio One 94.3 MHz, Hit 95 (95 MHz), Radio Mirchi 98.3 MHz, AIR FM Rainbow 102.6 MHz, Meow FM 104.8 MHz, AIR FM Gold 106.4 MHz. Radio IIMT (90.4 MHz) is the only radio station located in the city. The Hindi-language daily newspapers Hindustan, Rajasthan Patrika, Dainik Jagran, Amar Ujala, Dainik Janwani, The Hindu, Rashtrasewa, Dainik Jagran and iNext are published from the city. The English daily The Times of India, Meerut edition and the English language supplement HT City, with Hindustan Times is also published there. Moneymakers, an English daily, is published there. Asian Express, a Hindi newspaper, and news magazine Citizen of the World are also published there.

== Tourist destinations ==
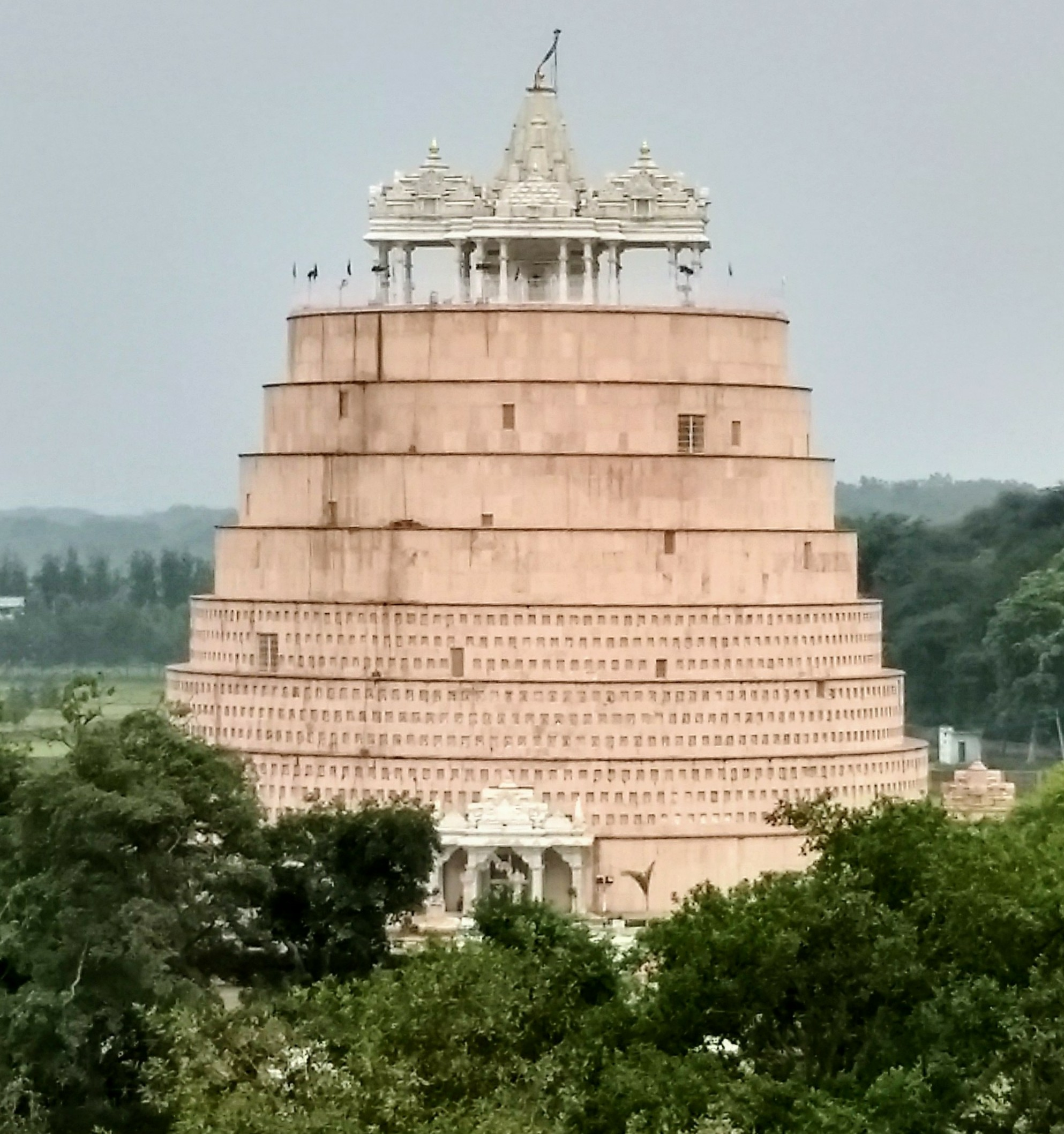
Ashtapad Jain temple, Hastinapur

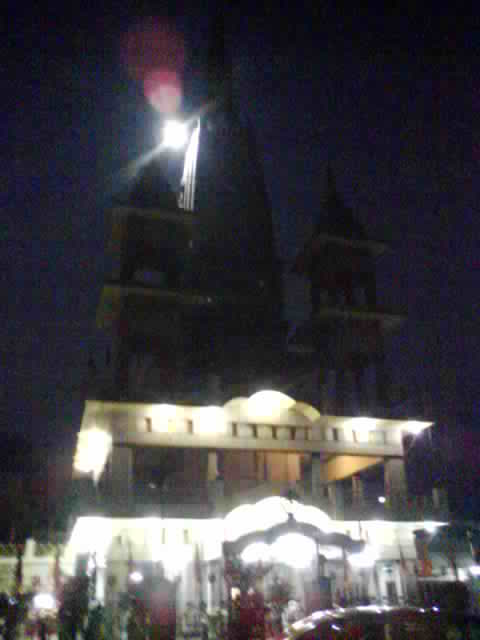
Augarnath Temple at 2nd Navaratri night

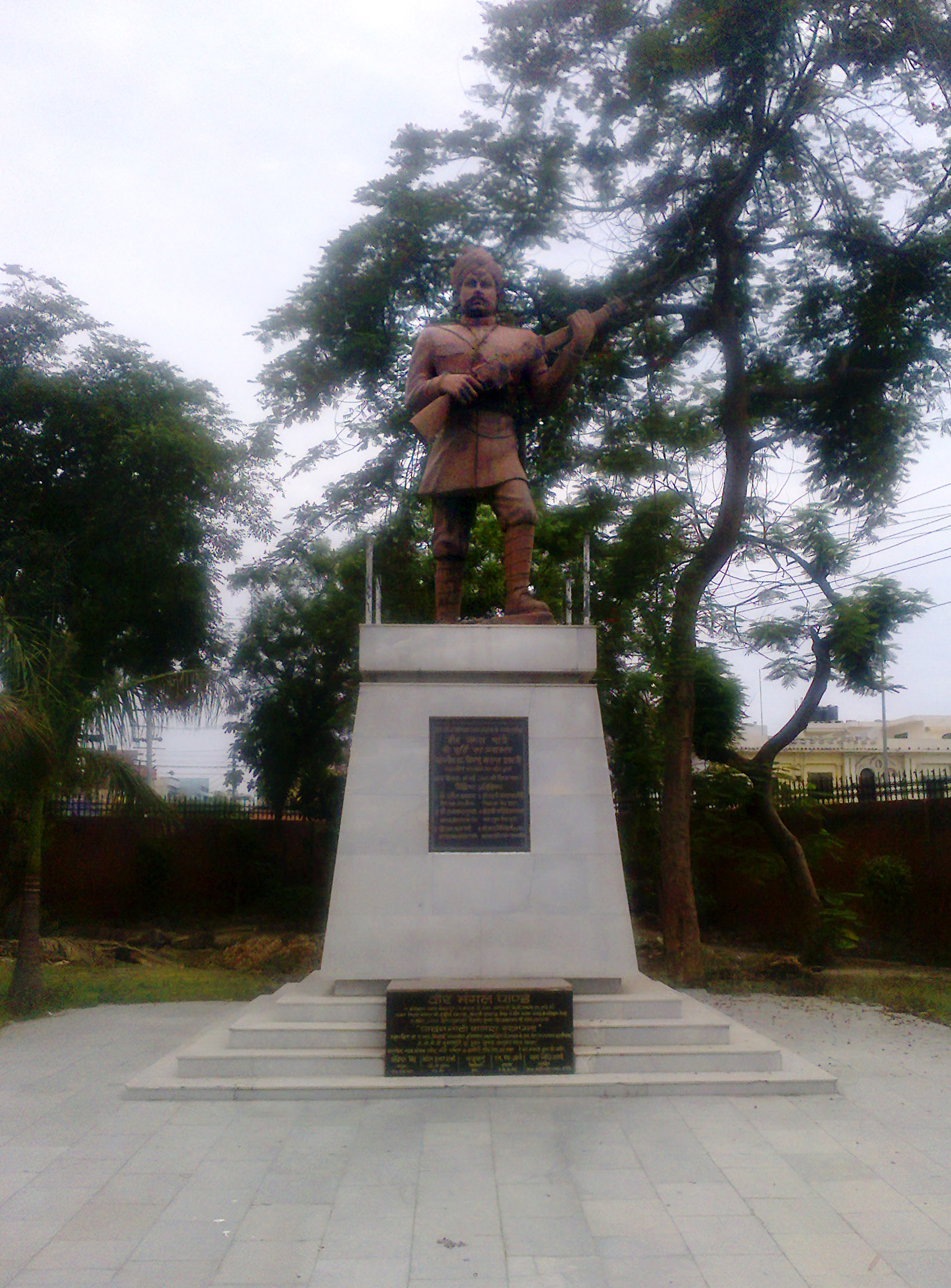
Statue of Mangal Pandey at Martyr's Memorial

Tourist destinations in and around Meerut include the following:

- Digamber Jain Bada Mandir Hastinapur – Located on the banks of the old ravine of the Ganges, it is considered one of the holiest places on earth by Jains. It is believed to be the birthplace of three Jain Tirthankaras. There are many ancient Jain temples in Hastinapur with the Digamber Jain Mandir, Jambudweep, Kailash Parvat Rachna, and Shwetambar Jain Temple being the most well known. Apart from Jain temples, the Pandeshwar temple, the Historical Gurdwara, and the Hastinapur Sanctuary are worth being seen.
- Government Freedom Struggle Museum and Shaheed Smarak (Martyr's Memorial) - Government Freedom Struggle Museum, Meerut was established in 1997. It is located in the Shaheed Smarak compound on Delhi Road, about 6 km north-east of the city railway station and at a distance of about 200 meters from the Delhi Bus Station. Visitors can stay in various guesthouses, private lodges, and hotels. The museum's main aim is the collection, preservation, documentation, and exhibition of cultural property and to make it available for educational activities as well as for the creation of awareness of Meerut's history. Some postal stamps, pictures, postcards, memorial coins related to the events of 1857, and later coins are also in the collection of the museum. The museum is in the developing stages and efforts are being made to collect more specimens. The museum organises educational programs such as lectures, seminars, and competitions related to history, culture, philosophy, the freedom struggle, and religion. It also aims to coordinate with other cultural and educational organisations for disseminating Indian culture, particularly the events related to the long-drawn freedom struggle of India.
- Shahi Jama Masjid – The Jama Masjid was built by Hasan Mahdi, Sultan Mahmud Ghaznavi's Wazir in 1019 AD (older than the Qutb Minar). It is considered the first masjid in North India. Although it was restored by Humayun, it is one of the oldest mosques in India. Some believe that the first North Indian Mosque is Quwwat/Qubbat ul Islam in Delhi and then Adhai Din Ka Jhonpra in Ajmer.
- St. John's Church – This church was established by Chaplain the Reverend Henry Fisher on behalf of the East India Company in 1819 in the cantonment area and was completed in 1822. It is considered one of the oldest churches in North India. The Church was dedicated to the people by Bishop Wilson. It has a seating capacity of 10,000 people. During the War of 1857, this church was the scene of heavy fighting between Indian and British forces.
- Augarnath Temple – This temple (also known as Kalipaltan Mandir locally) is located at the site where the soldiers of the War of 1857 planned their operations. The temple also houses a memorial built to honour the martyrs of the Indian Rebellion of 1857. The old temple has been replaced by a modern version. Augharnath Temple is also one of Shiva's oldest temples.

Other places of interest include Mansa Devi Temple, Baleni, Basilica of Our Lady of Graces, Sardhana and the Chandi Devi Temple which was built by Holkar queen Devi Ahiliyabai Holkar.

== Notable people ==
=== Indian Rebellion of 1857 ===
- Dhan Singh Gurjar, the person who started the Indian Rebellion of 1857 from Meerut
- Rao Kadam Singh, a leader of who fought against the British East India Company during the Indian Rebellion of 1857

=== Films and music ===
- Deepti Bhatnagar
- Bharat Bhushan
- Ayananka Bose
- Arun Govil
- Achint Kaur
- Kailash Kher
- Mitakshara Kumar
- Mandakini
- Popular Meeruthi
- Aziz Mian
- Pravesh Rana
- Chitrangada Singh
- Sanjeev Tyagi
- Syed Kamal

=== Politics ===
- Rajendra Agrawal, Member of Parliament, for Meerut
- Mohammed Shahid Akhlaq
- Dr. Laxmikant Bajpai, Former State President, BJP, Uttar Pradesh.
- Ravindra Kumar Bhadana, politician
- Hemlata Chaudhary, politician
- Lakhi Ram Nagar, businessman and politician
- Malook Nagar, businessman and politician
- Rubab Sayda
- Pyare Lal Sharma, freedom fighter and first Education Minister of Uttar Pradesh
- Yashwant Singh
- Somendra Tomar, Member of the Legislative Assembly for Meerut South
- Vijaypal Singh Tomar
- Seema Upadhyay

=== Sports ===
- Vivek Agarwal, cricketer
- Mohd Asab, shooter
- Manu Attri, badminton player
- Shapath Bharadwaj, shooter
- Garima Chaudhary, judoka
- Saurabh Chaudhary, shooter
- Dharampal Singh Gudha, oldest Gurjar athlete
- Praveen Gupta, cricketer
- Romeo James, field hockey player
- Paramjeet Kaur, athlete
- Muzzaffaruddin Khalid, cricketer
- Ashok Kumar, field hockey player
- Bhuvneshwar Kumar, cricketer
- Praveen Kumar, cricketer
- Raman Lamba, cricketer
- Shivam Mavi, cricketer
- Preethi Pal, runner
- Arvind Panwar, cyclist
- Annu Rani, athlete
- Sameer Rizvi, cricketer
- Shahzar Rizvi, shooter
- Karn Sharma, cricketer
- Umang Sharma, cricketer
- Mohinder Pal Singh, field hockey player
- Parvinder Singh, cricketer
- Shardul Vihan, sport shooter

=== Scholars ===
- Sir Ziauddin Ahmed, academic and parliamentarian
- Satish Chandra, historian
- Anu Garg, educationist and author
- K. P. S. Mahalwar, legal educationist and administrator
- Sheikh Abdul Aleem Siddiqui Qadri Meerathi, Islamic scholar and writer
- Zayn al-Abidin Sajjad Meerthi, Islamic scholar and historian
- Aashiq Elahi Meerthi, Islamic scholar, biographer, translator and writer
- Badre Alam Merathi, hadith scholar and poet
- Hafeez Merathi, Urdu poet, author and critic
- Ismail Merathi, Urdu poet, educationist
- Manu Prakash, scientist and MacArthur Fellowship awardee
- Muzaffar Warsi, poet, essayist, lyricist, and a scholar of Urdu
- Fahmida Riaz, Urdu writer, poet and activist
- Hamid Ullah Afsar, Urdu poet and writer

== See also ==
- 2006 Meerut fire
- Meerut Lok Sabha constituency
- Hapur Assembly constituency
- Kithore Assembly constituency
- Meerut Assembly constituency
- Meerut Cantonment Assembly constituency
- Meerut South Assembly constituency
- Largest Indian cities by GDP
