= Radio IIMT =

Radio station in Meerut, India

Radio IIMT is an Indian FM Station based in Ganga Nagar, Meerut, India. The broadcasting frequency is 90.4 MHz. It is owned by the IIMT University also known as IIMT Group of Colleges, Meerut. It is the first and only FM station based in Meerut. Its tagline is "iss se behtar aur kahan" "इस से बेहतर और कहाँ !!!".

It is on air 18 hours a day. It is a community radio which broadcasts education, health, culture, social, consumer law and agriculture based programmes. Its programmes also include interviews of community people invited as guests to various shows.

== See also ==
- Meerut
- List of FM Radio Stations in India
- Ganga Nagar, Meerut
