= Hafeez Merathi =

Indian Urdu poet, author (1922 – 2000)

- حفیظ میرٹھی
- Born: Hafeez-ur-Rahman; 10 January 1922; Meerut, Uttar Pradesh, India
- Died: 7 January 2000 (aged 77)
- Occupations: Writer, poet, Critics
- Writing career
- Notable work: "Aabaad Rahenge Virane Shadab Rahengi Zanjiren."

Hafeez Merathi (Urdu: حفیظ میرٹھی), whose real name was Hafeez-ur-Rahman (10 January 1922 – 7 January 2000) was an Indian Urdu poet, author and critic. He is known for his poem "Aabaad Rahenge Virane Shadab Rahengi Zanjiren."

== Early life and education ==
He was born to Mohammad Ibraheem Khaleel in 1922 at Meerut. In 1939, he completed his high school examination at the Faiz-e-Aam inter college. However, he had to halt his education after the passing of his maternal grandfather Munshi Khadim Husain, a literature enthusiast. This event sparked the poet within Hafeez. In 1947, he successfully passed his F.A as a private student.

Hafeez's maternal grandfather, Khadim Hussain, was fond of poetry and encouraged Hafeez's interest in it. Later, Hafeez began consulting Barelvi. Hafeez Sahib participated in poetry gatherings (mushairas) in various countries.

== Life ==
Initially, Hafeez consulted the poet Aasim Barelvi, but afterward, he did not settle under any particular teacher. His early poetry was deeply influenced by Jigar Muradabadi, characterized by similar tones, metaphors, and word combinations. However, after becoming a member of Jamaat-e-Islami, the nature of his poetry changed significantly. His association with Jamaat-e-Islami greatly influenced both his poetry and his life.

In 1975, the government imposed a state of emergency across the country, banning both the RSS and Jamaat-e-Islami, and arresting many of Jamaat-e-Islami's top leaders. Hafeez strongly opposed the Emergency through his poetry, which led to his imprisonment. Although he was released after some time, his views remained unchanged. He continued to express his dissent through poetry at mushairas, which eventually led to his re-arrest.

== Death ==
He died on 7 January 2000 in Meerut.

== Bibliography ==
- فہمی, جمال عباس (19 February 2024). "حفیظ میرٹھی: جس نے زندگی بھر مقصدی شاعری کی... جمال عباس فہمی". The Inquilab.
