= Aminagar Urf Bhurbaral =

- town
- Nickname: Bhoor Baral
- Location in Uttar Pradesh, India
- Coordinates: 28.905°N 77.628°E
- Country: India
- State: Uttar Pradesh
- District: Meerut

Population (2001)
  - Total: 5,495

Languages
  - Official: Hindi, Urdu, English
- Time zone: UTC+5:30 (IST)

Aminagar Urf Bhurbaral is a census town near Meerut city in Meerut district in the state of Uttar Pradesh, India. Commonly called Bhoorbaral or Bhurbaral. It is located 60 km (37 mi) northeast of the national capital New Delhi. It is a part of National Capital Region of India.

== Demographics ==
As of 2001 India census, Aminagar Urf Bhurbaral had a population of 5,495. Males constitute 52% of the population and females 48%. Aminagar Urf Bhurbaral has an average literacy rate of 39%, lower than the national average of 59.5%; with 30% of the males and 39% of females literate. 18% of the population is under 6 years of age.

== Education ==
There are 3 government schools. 39% of population is educated and many of them are in defence services, doctors and civil services.

== Healthcare ==
There are 2 hospitals in this village, located at east and west side. Both of these hospitals are fully government funded. East side hospital is called Primary Health Centre (PHC) treats patients with Ayurvedic (आयुर्वेदिक) and Homeopathy and west side hospital is called Community Health Center (CHC).

There are multiple private walk in clinics in the village. There's one certified physiotherapy naturopathy clinic at Pandit Chowk named Bhardwaj Physiotherapy & Naturopathy Clinic.

=== Air ===
The nearest airport is the Indira Gandhi International Airport which is about 88 km away, apart from this there's an air strip named Dr. Bheem Rao Ambedkar Airstrip situated at Partapur, 9 km south of Village Gagol of Meerut, in Uttar Pradesh, India.

=== Roads ===
By road Bhur Baral is well-connected to major cities like Delhi, Noida, Faridabad, Ghaziabad, Haridwar, Dehradun etc.
