= 2006 Meerut fire =

Fire in Meerut, India

Coordinates: 28.99°N 77.7°E

On 10 April 2006 at about 17:30 IST (12:00 UTC), a fire swept through a consumer electronics fair (Brand India Fair) in Victoria Park, Meerut, killing 65 people and injuring 150 others. The fire was said to have been caused by a short circuit. An estimated 2,000 people were at the fair when the fire broke out. The Consumer Trade Fair, where the fire broke out, was being organized by Brand India Consumers Forum and was jointly sponsored by the local Dainik Jagaran.

The fair was being held in 100 metres long air-conditioned tents with only one main entry point and the exit was either through the hall C or from the backside food stalls area. The organisers had not obtained a No Objection Certificate from the fire department, but had duly conveyed the CFO in writing, as required. The fire took place on the last day & last hour of the five-day fair and trapped at least 3000 people within the venue. While one version said that the fire was caused by a short circuit, another account said that it began in a furniture shop where spirit polish was being used. The stories spread that fire was fuelled further by the bursting of cooking gas cylinders used by the makeshift eateries within the venue, which however was never substantiated later. In all, three giant tents were destroyed. The fire spread within five minutes and as there were only one entrance and one exit in each hall, apart from a few not very visibly highlighted Emergency Exits, the children and women got trapped in it as the fire blazed rapidly. The army and the Rapid Action Force was called in to help with rescue efforts.

== Reactions ==
The Prime Minister of India, Manmohan Singh and leaders of various political parties expressed shock and mourned the loss of lives. The Bharatiya Janata Party said that the incident was a result of deteriorating law and order situation in Uttar Pradesh. Then Chief Minister of Uttar Pradesh, Mulayam Singh Yadav announced a compensation of ₹ 200,000 to the families of each victim killed, ₹ 50,000 to each of the seriously injured and ₹ 25,000 to each person having minor injuries. Bahujan Samaj Party president Mayawati, Congress party president Sonia Gandhi, then Union Minister of State for Home Prakash Jaiswal, then Uttar Pradesh Chief Minister Mulayam Singh Yadav, and then Bharatiya Janata Party president Rajnath Singh visited the city in the aftermath of the fire.

Hundreds of residents protested the next day outside the park where the fire took place. Upon visiting, the Chief Minister and a local MLA were roughed up.

== Investigation ==
An FIR has been registered against the organisers of the fair and an electrical contractor, all of whom have been declared absconding. The Government of Uttar Pradesh also announced a magisterial inquiry into the incident. The district magistrate, deputy magistrate, and the district and city police chiefs were transferred following public allegations of negligence in the organisation of the fair. The Government of Uttar Pradesh & Central Govt did not disclose actual casualties.
