= Meerut scissors =

A Meerut scissors is any scissors made of recycled metal scrap by microlevel industrial units in Meerut, India. The community has been making the product for more than three centuries.

== Recycling from waste ==
Meerut scissors are particularly used for garment making and other domestic uses. All parts of the scissors are pre-used in some other form. For example, the blades are made from recycled carbon steel sourced from scrap metal, which may be salvaged from old railway rolling stock, automobiles or other sources. The handles, made of metal alloys or plastics, are prepared from other wastes such as old utensils. The first such scissors were made by Asli Akhun around the year 1653. Unlike most other scissors, Meerut scissors can be repaired and reused many times. An idiom popular around Meerut refers to the quality and re-usability of these instruments as a testimony: Dada le, potaa barpe ('bought by the grandfather, [still] used by the grandson').

== Geographic indication tag ==
In January 2013, the product was recognized to qualify for its own geographical indication. It was the 164th among a list of such specially tagged commodity items in India. Until now, these scissors were produced in a variety of sizes ranging from 6–14 inches (150–360 mm). They also had different price ranges, from ₹20 to ₹500. However, with the GI tags, the producers were encouraged to come up with standard sizes and price levels.

The industry is well established around Meerut, with 250 small-scale scissors-making units, employing 70,000 people directly and indirectly. Manufacturing typically follows a gendered division of labour, with men making the scissors and women performing tasks that require handwork and packing the products. Even when the market is confined to domestic consumption, makers find it tough to meet the demand.
