= K. P. S. Mahalwar =

Indian legal education administrator (born 1955)

K.P.S. Mahalwar
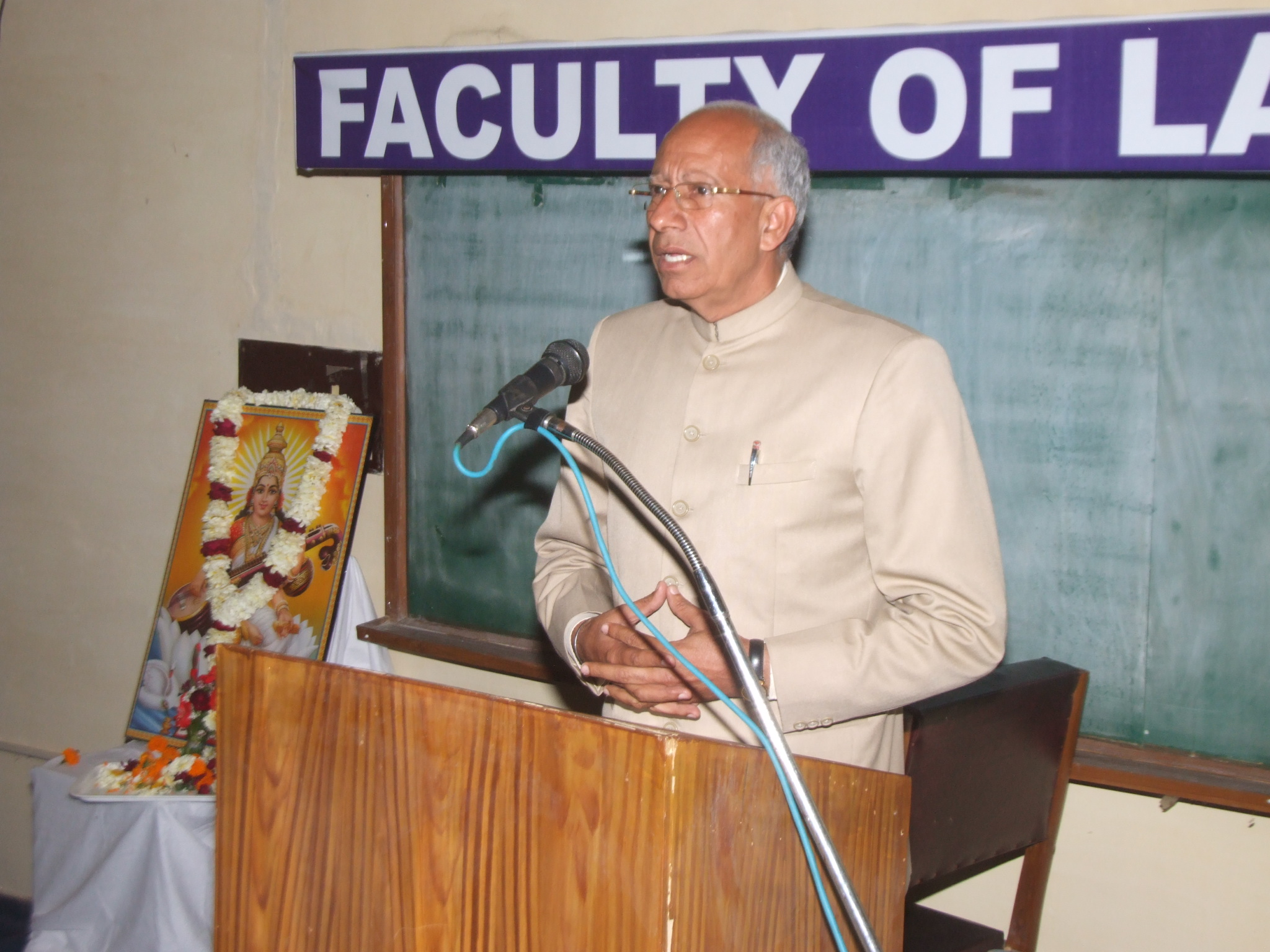
- Born: 1955 (age 70–71)
- Education: M.D. University, Rohtak; (Ph.D., 1987); Chaudhary Charan Singh University, Meerut; (LL.M., 1978); Meerut University, Meerut; (LL.B. 1976); Other; (B.Sc. 1973)
- Occupation: Legal education administrator
- Title: Professor

Krishan Pal Singh Mahalwar (born 1955) is an Indian legal education administrator, jurist presently working in National Law University, Delhi as visiting professor.

== Education ==
Mahalwar was awarded a Ph.D. in 1987 by M.D. University (Rohtak). He receive a post-graduate LL.M. in 1978 from Chaudhary Charan Singh University (Meerut) an undergraduate LL.B. in 1976 from Meerut University (Meerut) and a B.Sc. in 1973 (institution unknown).

== Career ==
Mahalwar has worked as a chair professor, Justice Bodh Raj Sawhney Chair on Professional ethics in NLU Delhi. He has previously worked as Head and Dean of the Law Department, Maharishi Dayanand University, Rohtak, India. He has been distinguished invitees, Chief Guest, Guest of honor in various universities. He was appointed lecturer MDU, Rohtak in 1979. In 1990 as a Reader and Professor in 1999. He has been the Director of National Law College Gurgaon also in 2001–2002. He had been Proctor at MDU Rohtak. He has been associated with UGC, UPSC, various universities of India in various capacities.

== Awards ==
Mahalwar has been awarded with the Life Time Achievement award by AILTC in December 2009. Haryana Government has also appointed him as a member of the Haryana State Higher Education Council.

== Research ==
Mahalwar has published two books and 65 research papers and book reviews. He has participated and organised many seminars and conferences.

== Published works ==
- Mahalwar, K. P. S. (1991). Medical negligence and the law. New Delhi: Deep & Deep Publications. ISBN 81-7100-298-6.
