= Kali Paltan Mandir =

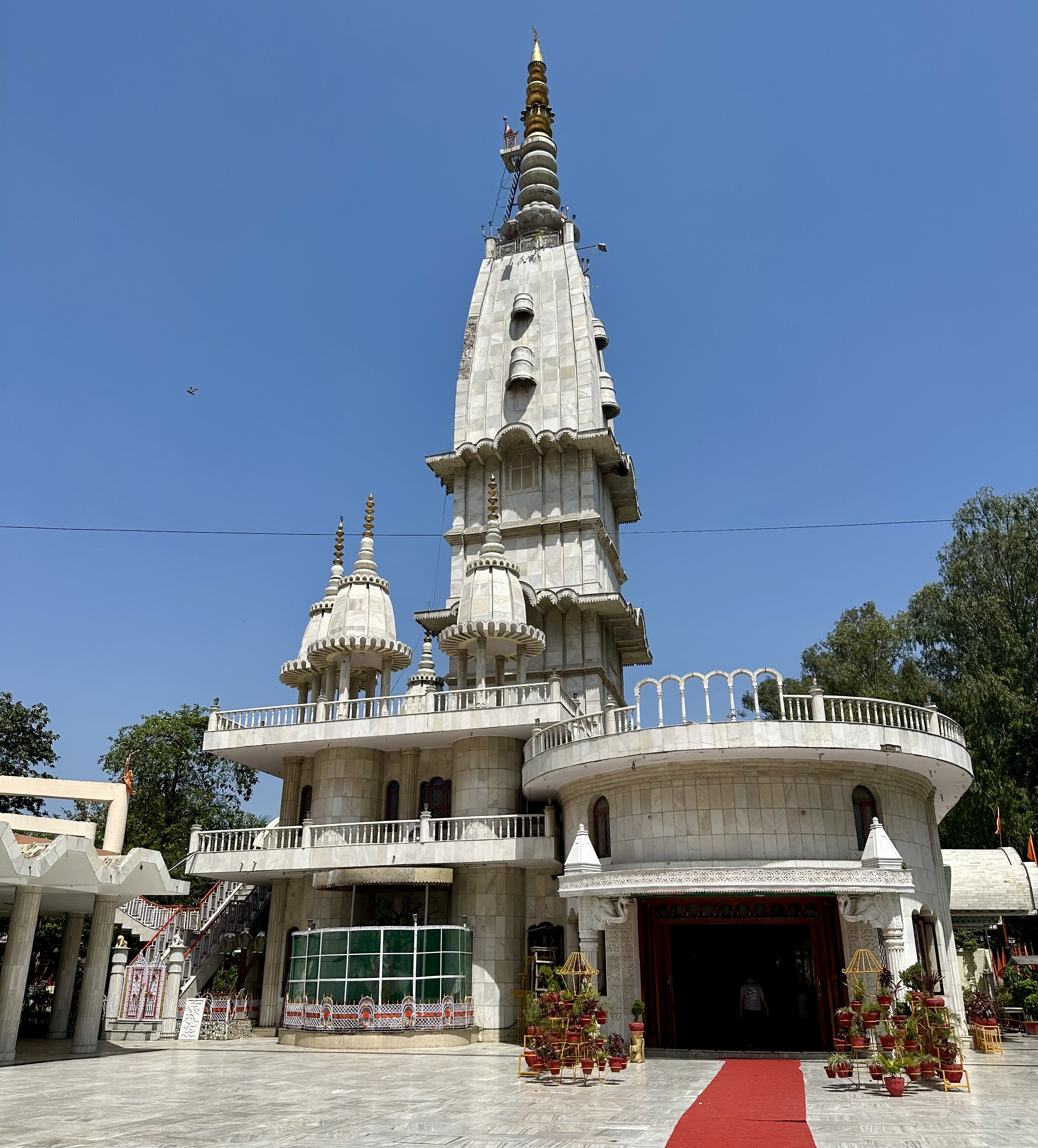

Religion
- Affiliation: Hinduism
- Deity: Shiva

Location
- Location: Meerut
- State: Uttar Pradesh
- Country: India

Kali Paltan Mandir is the commonly used name of the Shiva temple Augarhnath Mandir, close to the army barracks in the Indian city of Meerut, Uttar Pradesh. It was founded following the discovery of a Shivalinga under the ground in 1844. The foundation stone for the modern larger temple complex was laid in 1968. The temple houses the water well where Indian sepoys who fired the first shots in the Indian Rebellion of 1857 met.

== Gallery ==
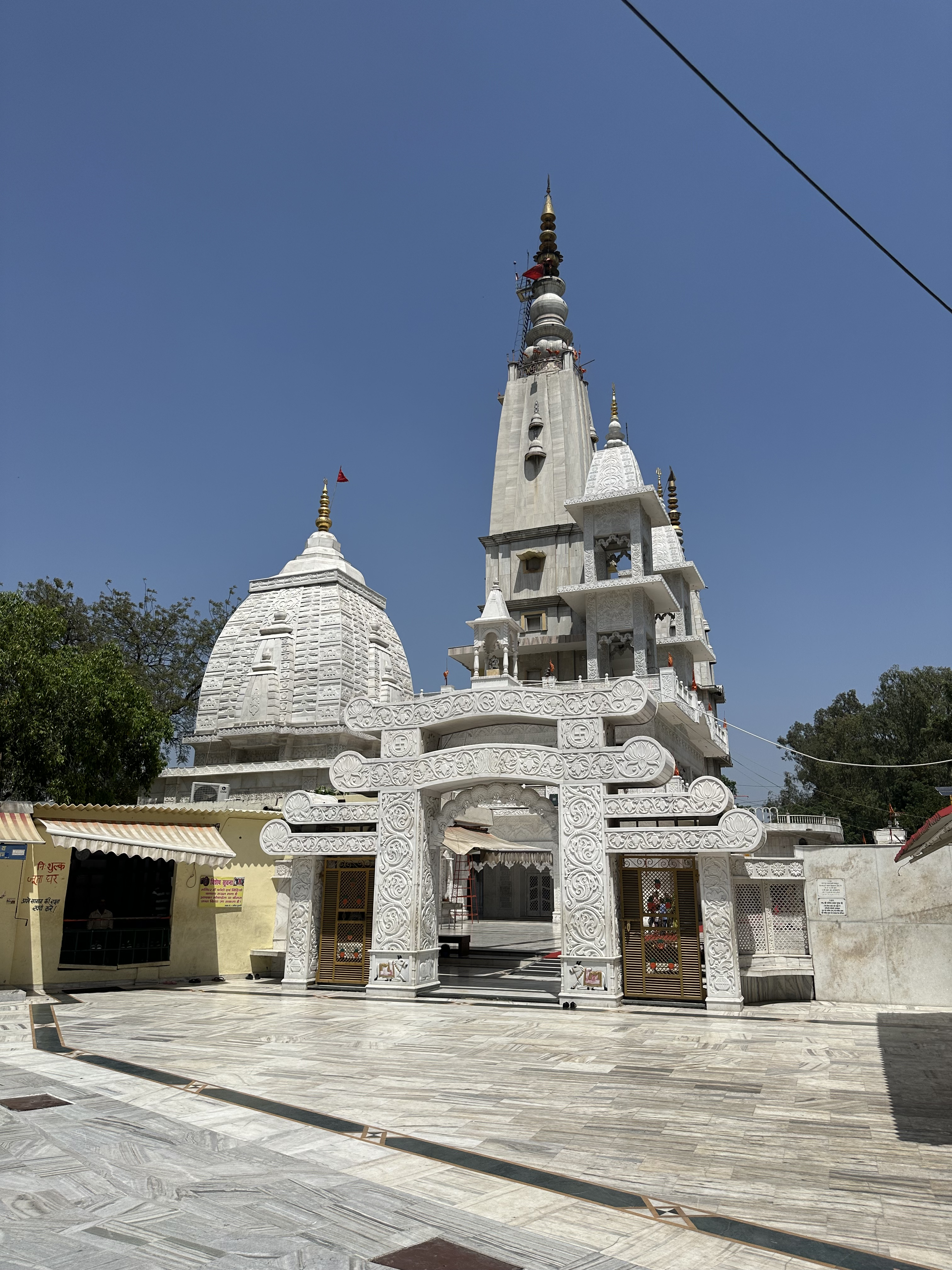
Exterior

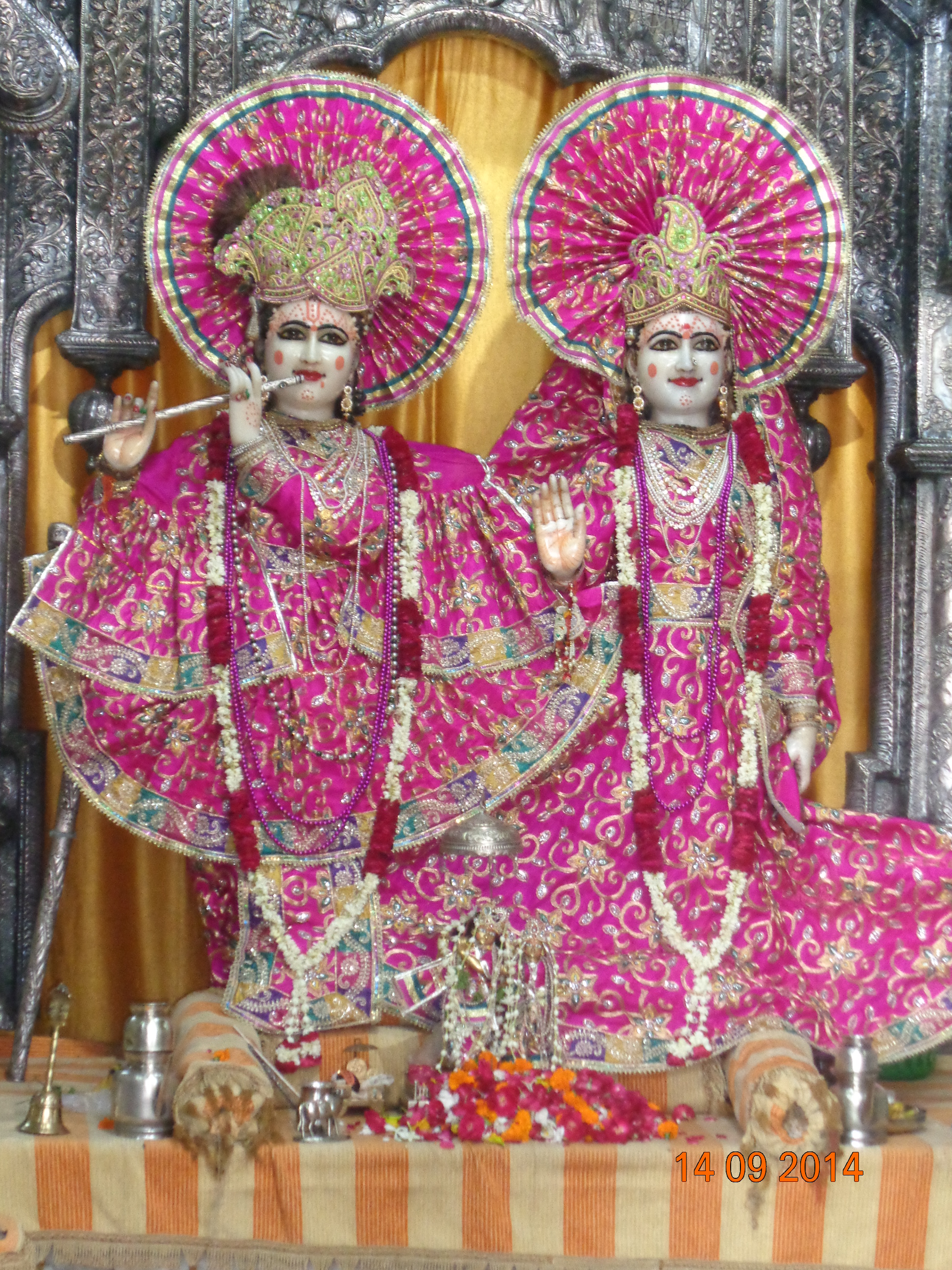
Radhakrishna

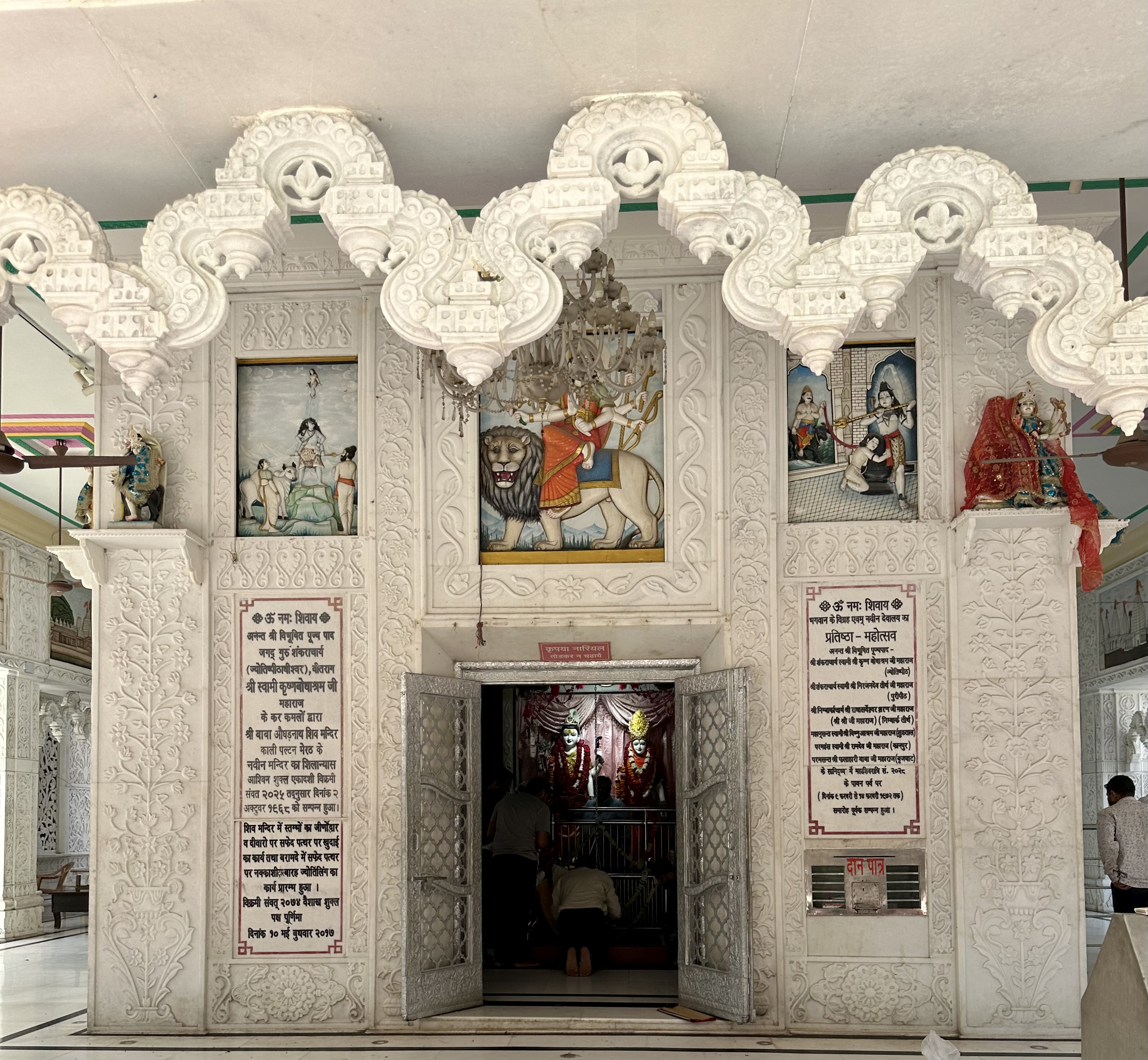
Interior

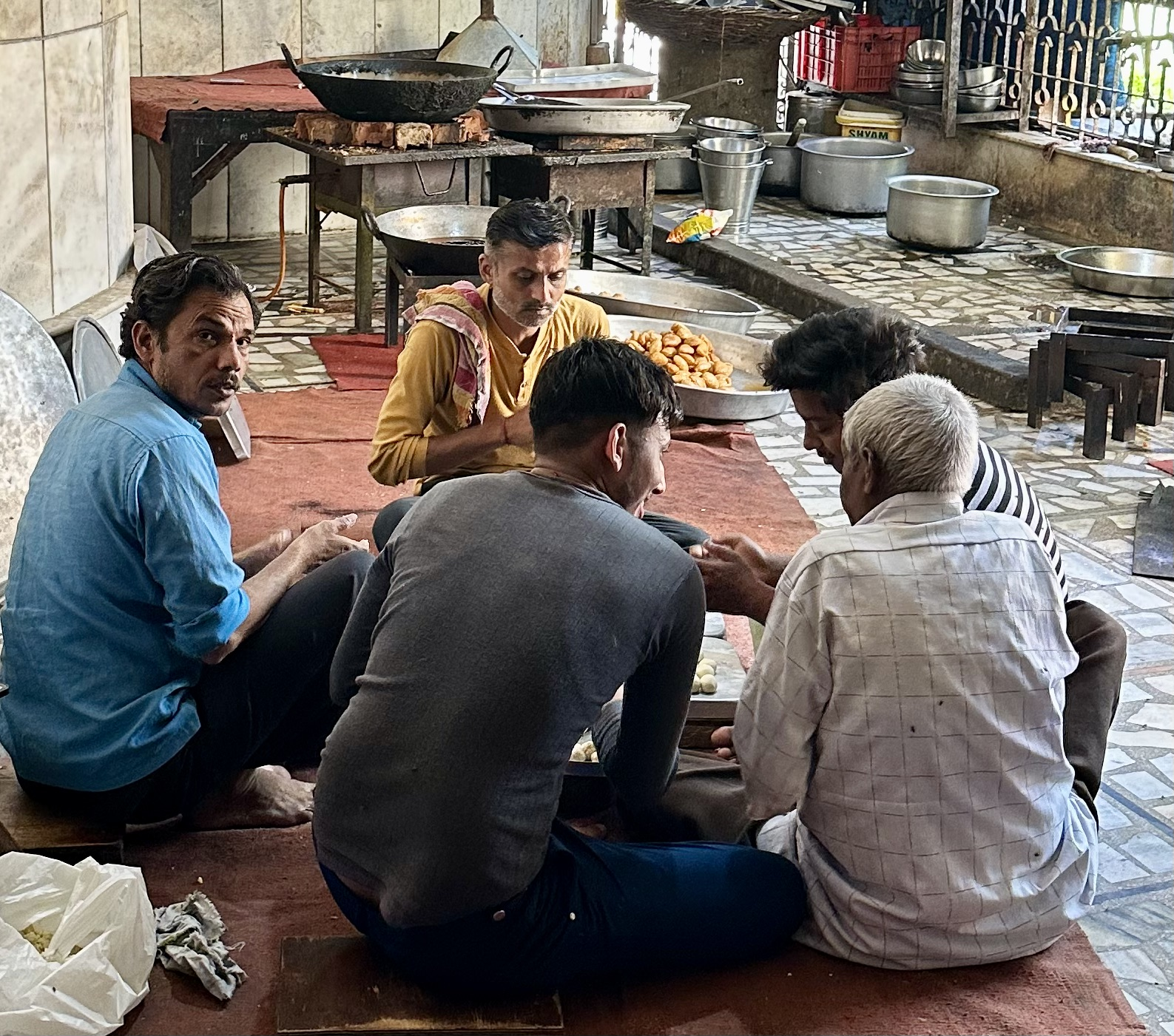
Kitchen

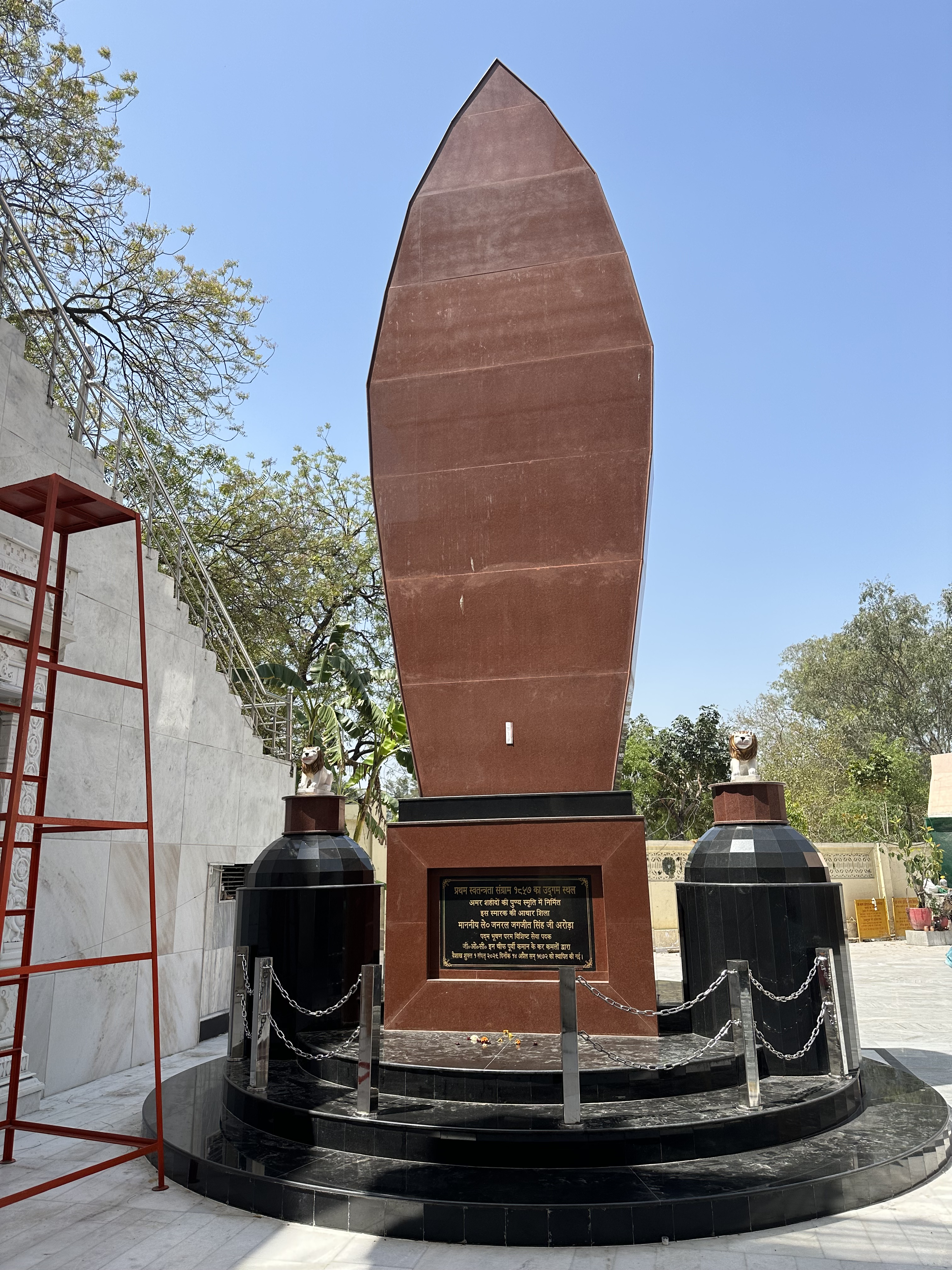
1857 memorial

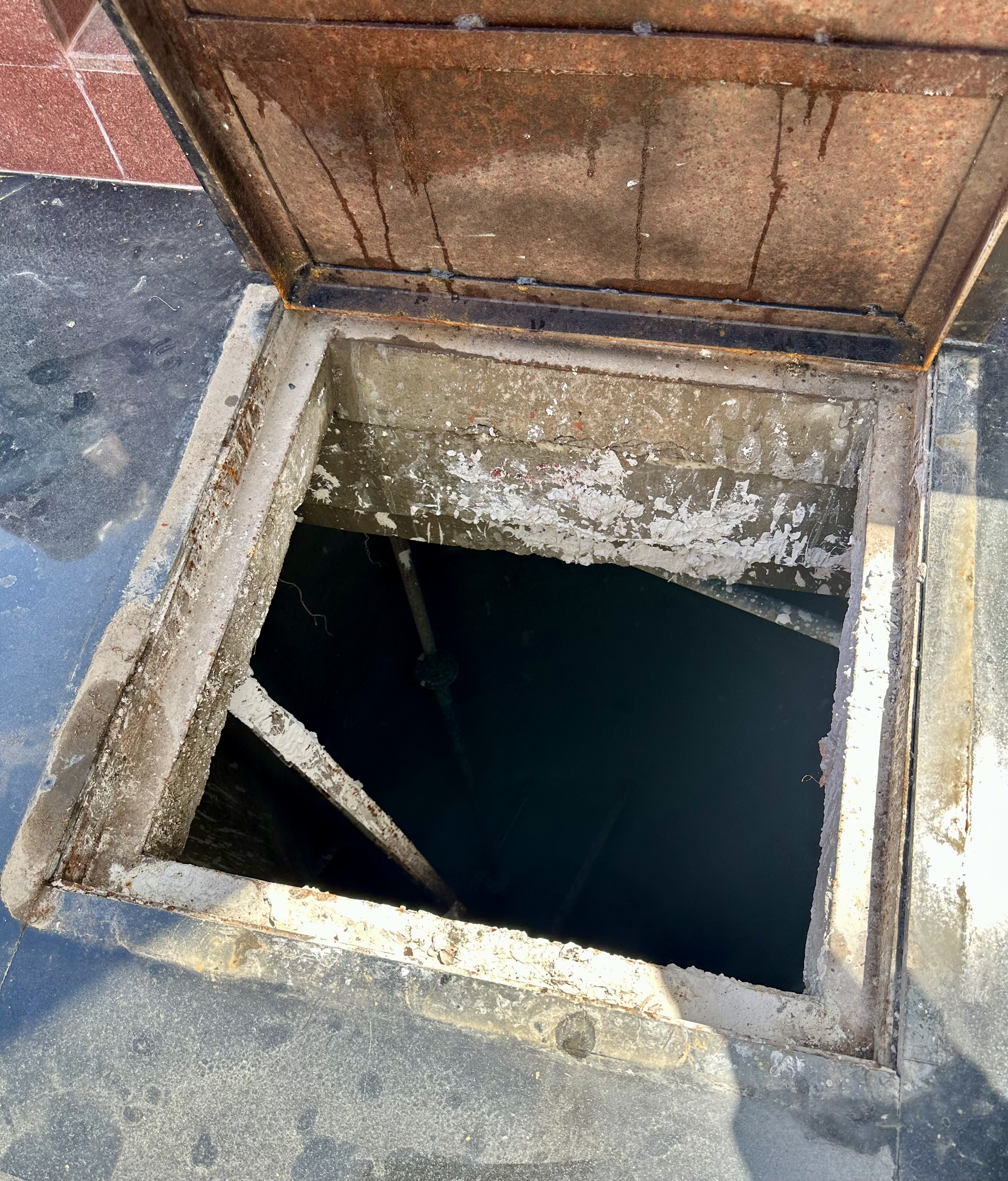
Well
