= Mohiuddinpur =

- Census town
- Location in Uttar Pradesh, India
- Coordinates: 29.985048°N 77.643535°E
- Country: India
- State: Uttar Pradesh
- District: Tanda, Ambedkarnagar

Population (2001)
  - Total: 4,892

Languages
  - Official: Hindi
- Time zone: UTC+5:30 (IST)

Mohiuddinpur is a census town in the Ambedkar Nagar District in the Indian state of Uttar Pradesh.

== Demographics ==
As of 2001 India census, Mohiuddinpur had a population of 4,892. Males constitute 55% of the population and females 45%. Mohiuddinpur has an average literacy rate of 63%, higher than the national average of 59.5%: male literacy is 71%, and female literacy is 52%. In Mohiuddinpur, 14% of the population is under 6 years of age.
