= Ghaziabad–Jewar Regional Rapid Transit System =

Proposed regional transit system in India

Overview
- Other name(s): Ghaziabad–Jewar Airport RRTS; Ghaziabad–Noida–Jewar RRTS
- Owner: National Capital Region Transport Corporation (NCRTC)
- Locale: National Capital Region (NCR)
- Termini: Ghaziabad; Noida International Airport
- Stations: 12
- Website: ncrtc.in

Service
- Type: Semi-high speed rail Regional transit
- Services: 1
- Daily ridership: 326,000 (FY 2030-31); 757,000 (FY 2054-55) (projected)

History
- Planned opening: 2030; 4 years' time

Technical
- Line length: 72.44 km (45.01 mi)
- Character: Elevated, at-grade and underground
- Track gauge: 1,435 mm (4 ft 8 1/2 in) standard gauge
- Electrification: 25 kV 50 Hz AC overhead catenary
- Operating speed: 84 km/h (52 mph) (average, regular service); 114 km/h (70 mph) (average, express)
- Signalling: ETCS L2/L3 over LTE

The Ghaziabad–Jewar Regional Rapid Transit System (Ghaziabad–Jewar RRTS) is a proposed 72.44 km (45.01 mi) semi high-speed rail and regional transit corridor that will connect the National Capital Region cities of Ghaziabad and Noida with Noida International Airport at Jewar. It is the fourth of the four rapid rail corridors planned under the first phase of the RapidX project managed by the National Capital Region Transport Corporation (NCRTC). It will be built to allow a maximum speed of 180 km/h (110 mph), and the distance between Ghaziabad, Noida and the airport will be covered in less than 40–50 minutes. The project is estimated to cost approximately ₹20,640 crore (US$2.5 billion). It will originate from Ghaziabad, run through Noida, Greater Noida, YEIDA City and end at the Noida International Airport at Jewar. It will have 12 stations and two depots on both the northern and southern ends of the corridor.

The project comprises two sections to distinguish between the urban and the rural divisions. The first will be from Ghaziabad to Kasna or Ecotech VI of Greater Noida, covering 32.9 km (20.4 mi) by running in tandem with Noida Metro's 10 km (6.2 mi) extension between Char Murti Chowk and Knowledge Park-V, while concurrently integrating with Delhi Metro's Red Line at Ghaziabad.

The second will be from Kasna or Ecotech VI to Noida International Airport at Jewar by passing through the under-development YEIDA City, covering 32.9 km (20.4 mi), where it will be integrated with the proposed 14.6 km (9.1 mi) light rail line, which will serve the upcoming Noida Film City. The RRTS project was given an in-principle approval by the Government of Uttar Pradesh in December 2023, and the Yamuna Expressway Industrial Development Authority issued work order to the owner of the four RRTS corridors, NCRTC, to prepare the detailed project report of the project in January 2024. The NCRTC submitted the DPR within three months to YEIDA and the Government of Uttar Pradesh in April 2024.

== History ==
=== NCR Transport plan ===
In response to the growing challenges of population growth, traffic congestion, pollution, and road safety in the National Capital Region, the Planning Commission formed a task force in 2005, chaired by the Secretary of the Ministry of Urban Development. The goal was to develop a multi-modal regional transit system to improve connectivity in the region. This initiative became part of the Integrated Transport Plan for NCR 2032, with a particular focus on establishing a Regional Rapid Transit System to link regional centers.

In 2013, the Governments of India and Delhi moved forward with plans to create a regional railway system that would directly connect Delhi with neighboring cities and areas in the NCR and beyond. This led to the establishment of the National Capital Region Transport Corporation in July 2013, a joint venture between the Governments of India and the states of Haryana, Rajasthan, Uttar Pradesh, and Delhi. The NCRTC was tasked with building, owning, and operating the RRTS to reduce reliance on road transport and improve regional connectivity. Within Delhi, the RRTS will primarily operate underground and integrate with the Delhi Metro, offering commuters a faster transit option and improved last-mile connectivity. This system draws inspiration from successful regional transit networks like London's Crossrail, Paris' RER and Munich's S-Bahn, aiming to provide a modern and efficient transit solution for the NCR.

Initially, eight corridors spanning at least 1,000 km (620 mi) across the NCR were proposed for implementation. This number has since increased to nine, with four corridors prioritized for development in the coming years: Delhi–Meerut, Delhi–Alwar, Delhi–Panipat, and Ghaziabad–Jewar. The Delhi–Meerut corridor was selected as the first to be implemented due to the high volume of daily travelers and significant traffic between the two cities. As a result, the central and state governments, along with the NCRTC, conducted feasibility studies and approved its construction.

The Ghaziabad–Jewar corridor is the most recent addition, announced by the Government of Uttar Pradesh in December 2023. This corridor aims to establish direct and seamless connectivity to the under-construction YEIDA City and the Noida International Airport in Jewar.

=== RRTS for Jewar Airport ===
There have been plans to link the under-construction Noida International Airport in Jewar with Delhi and the rest of the National Capital Region (NCR) through a direct metro line since May 2019, when the Delhi Metro Rail Corporation (DMRC) showcased their plans with seven options, including either to make Greater Noida the origin of the line as a second line of Noida Metro, or extending the Delhi Metro's Violet Line till the airport from its terminating point at Faridabad. In June 2023, an RRTS corridor plan was presented by the DMRC to link the airport with Indira Gandhi International Airport in Delhi, the current primary airport of the NCR, as an 'Airport Express Corridor'. However, although the option of extending the Violet Line continues to be the most feasible option to connect southern Delhi, Gurugram and Faridabad with the airport, the plan for the line from Greater Noida to the airport as a second line of Noida Metro was shelved in October 2023, when V. K. Singh, then minister of state for road transport and highways as well as civil aviation, introduced the proposal of creating an RRTS corridor from Ghaziabad to the airport.

In response to this, the Chief Minister of Uttar Pradesh, Yogi Adityanath, expressed interest to the owner of the four Regional Rapid Transit System (RRTS) corridors, NCRTC on creating a corridor from Delhi's Sarai Kale Khan station, the terminal station of the three corridors to Meerut, Panipat and Alwar, to the under-construction Noida International Airport at Jewar, in order to provide a direct link to the new airport from Delhi and the rest of the National Capital Region (NCR). Nonetheless, due to lack of space and limited feasibility, the plan was changed to make the corridor start from Ghaziabad station on the Delhi–Meerut Regional Rapid Transit System, which has been built with four platforms to serve two corridors, and pass through Noida, Greater Noida and take course on the Yamuna Expressway before terminating at Jewar Airport.

In December 2023, the Government of Uttar Pradesh approved the plan for ₹1,600 crore (US$170 million), and the Yamuna Expressway Industrial Development Authority (YEIDA) directed the NCRTC to prepare the Detailed Project Report (DPR) and the feasibility study of the project in January 2024, and began the geotechnical survey for preparing the DPR in the same month in Greater Noida. At the time, it was reported that the opening could be in 2030 "if everything unfolds as planned". The NCRTC submitted the DPR and the feasibility study in three months to the YEIDA and the Government of Uttar Pradesh in April 2024, and is currently waiting for a final approval from the Governments of India and Uttar Pradesh. In August 2024, the NCRTC submitted a revised DPR to the Government of Uttar Pradesh for allowing final execution of the project.

== Construction ==
In January 2024, the NCRTC was directed by the Yamuna Expressway Industrial Development Authority to carry out the preparatory works for construction and preparing the Detailed Project Report (DPR) for the corridor. Therefore, the NCRTC undertook the geotechnical survey of the corridor's alignment by awarding the work to Cengrs Geotechnica, a Noida-based firm, and then started to prepare the DPR in the same month. It submitted the DPR to the Government of Uttar Pradesh and YEIDA in April 2024. As of May 2024, it is awaiting final approval from the Government of India, Government of Uttar Pradesh, and YEIDA before construction can commence.

=== Source of funding ===
In March 2024, the Yamuna Expressway Industrial Development Authority (YEIDA) finalised and approved the project's funding of about ₹20,045 crore (US$2.1 billion), of which 50% will be funded by the Government of India, 30% by the YEIDA and the Greater Noida Industrial Development Authority (GNIDA) and 20% by the Government of Uttar Pradesh. The funding was done under the interim national budget of financial year 2024-25.

=== Sections ===
The entire length of 72.44 km (45.01 mi) has been divided into two sections to distinguish between the urban and rural divisions and traffic in the areas, according to the Detailed Project Report (DPR), which states that the first section is projected to witness more passengers, as this route is surrounded by densely populated areas of Ghaziabad, Noida and Greater Noida, as compared to the second section that is currently surrounded by rural areas as part of the upcoming YEIDA City. The corridor will be integrated with Delhi Metro and Noida Metro, with which it will run and operate the metro on a single corridor, similar to the Meerut Metro being built on a single corridor of the Delhi–Meerut Regional Rapid Transit System. The entire route will have a total of 22 stations-12 for the RRTS and 10 for the Noida Metro and a proposed light rail project to serve Noida Film City. It will be designed for a maximum speed of 180 km/h (110 mph), with an operating speed of 114 km/h (71 mph). The average speed will be 84 km/h (52 mph).

==== Section I ====
The first section covering 39.39 km (24.48 mi) will be entirely elevated, starting from Ghaziabad station on the Delhi–Meerut Regional Rapid Transit System to Kasna or Ecotech VI in Greater Noida, with seven RRTS stations and 11 Noida Metro stations, with a provision to add three more RRTS stations in the future, to be built at an estimated cost of about ₹13,055 crore (US$1.4 billion). It will traverse along the Vishvakarma road in Siddharth Vihar and Pratap Vihar in Ghaziabad, Taj highway, Char Murti Chowk, Greater Noida Link road at Knowledge Park-V, and then will turn towards Surajpur-Kasna road, before passing through Pari Chowk, which ends at Ecotech VI in Kasna. The first section will integrate as one corridor with the proposed 10 km (6.2 mi) Noida Metro's extension between Char Murti Chowk and Knowledge Park-V. It will also integrate with Delhi Metro's Red Line at Ghaziabad, the Aqua Line of Noida Metro at Char Murti Chowk and Alpha I station of Aqua Line near Pari Chowk.

==== Section II ====
The second section will cover 32.9 km (20.4 mi) will also be elevated, starting from Kasna or Ecotech VI to Noida International Airport at Jewar, with four RRTS stations and one metro station, to be built at a cost of about ₹6,988 crore (US$750 million), with a provision to add ten more metro stations in the future. Its alignment will pass along the Yamuna Expressway through the towns and villages of Dankaur, Dhanauri, Kanarsi, Bhatta, Parsaul, Rabupura, Dayanatpur and Kishorpur before reaching Noida International Airport, which will be built underground. It will be integrated as one corridor with the proposed 14.6 km (9.1 mi) light rail corridor, aimed to connect the under-construction airport with Sector 21, where the Noida Film City is being developed.

== Stations ==
The RRTS corridor will begin from Ghaziabad, through which the existing Delhi–Meerut Regional Rapid Transit System operates with a stop, pass through Noida and Greater Noida by running along with the Noida Metro, and take its course from the Yamuna Expressway along the YEIDA City by running simultaneously with the proposed 14.6 km (9.1 mi)-long light rail corridor linking Noida Film City, before ending at Noida International Airport in Jewar. The corridor will have a total of 12 stations, with 11 intermediate stations as metro and light rail stations, where the RRTS will not have any stops. The RRTS will have a provision of adding an additional ten metro stations and one RRTS station to specially cater to the traffic of the upcoming YEIDA City in the coming years. It will have two depots on its northern and southern sides, whose locations are yet to be finalised. The designs of the stations are also yet to be done.

Ghaziabad–Jewar RRTS
No.	Station Code	Station Name		Connections	Station Layout	Platform Level Type	Status	Opening
No.	Station Code	English	Hindi	Connections	Station Layout	Platform Level Type	Status	Opening
1		Ghaziabad	गाज़ियाबाद	Delhi–Meerut; Red Line	Elevated	Island	Completed	2030?
2		Ghaziabad South	गाज़ियाबाद दक्षिण	None	Elevated	Side	Planned	2030?
3		Greater Noida West-Sector IV	ग्रेटर नोएडा वेस्ट-सेक्टर IV	Aqua Line	Elevated	Island	Planned	2030?
4		Greater Noida West-Sector II	ग्रेटर नोएडा वेस्ट-सेक्टर II	Aqua Line	Elevated	Island	Planned	2030?
5		Knowledge Park V	नौलेज पार्क V	Aqua Line	Elevated	Island	Planned	2030?
6		Surajpur	सूरजपुर	Aqua Line	Elevated	Island	Planned	2030?
7		Pari Chowk	परी चौक	Aqua Line	Elevated	Island	Planned	2030?
8		Ecotech VI	इकोटेक VI	None	Elevated	Side	Planned	2030?
9		Dankaur	दनकौर	None	Elevated	Side	Planned	2030?
10		YEIDA North-Sector 18	येइडा उत्तर-सेक्टर 18	Noida Film City Light Rail (Proposed)	Elevated	Island	Planned	2030?
11		YEIDA Central-Sector 21	येइडा सेन्ट्रल-सेक्टर 21	Noida Film City Light Rail (Proposed)	Elevated	Island	Planned	2030?
12		Jewar Airport	जेवर एयरपोर्ट	Noida International Airport	Underground	Island	Planned	2030?

== Rolling stock ==
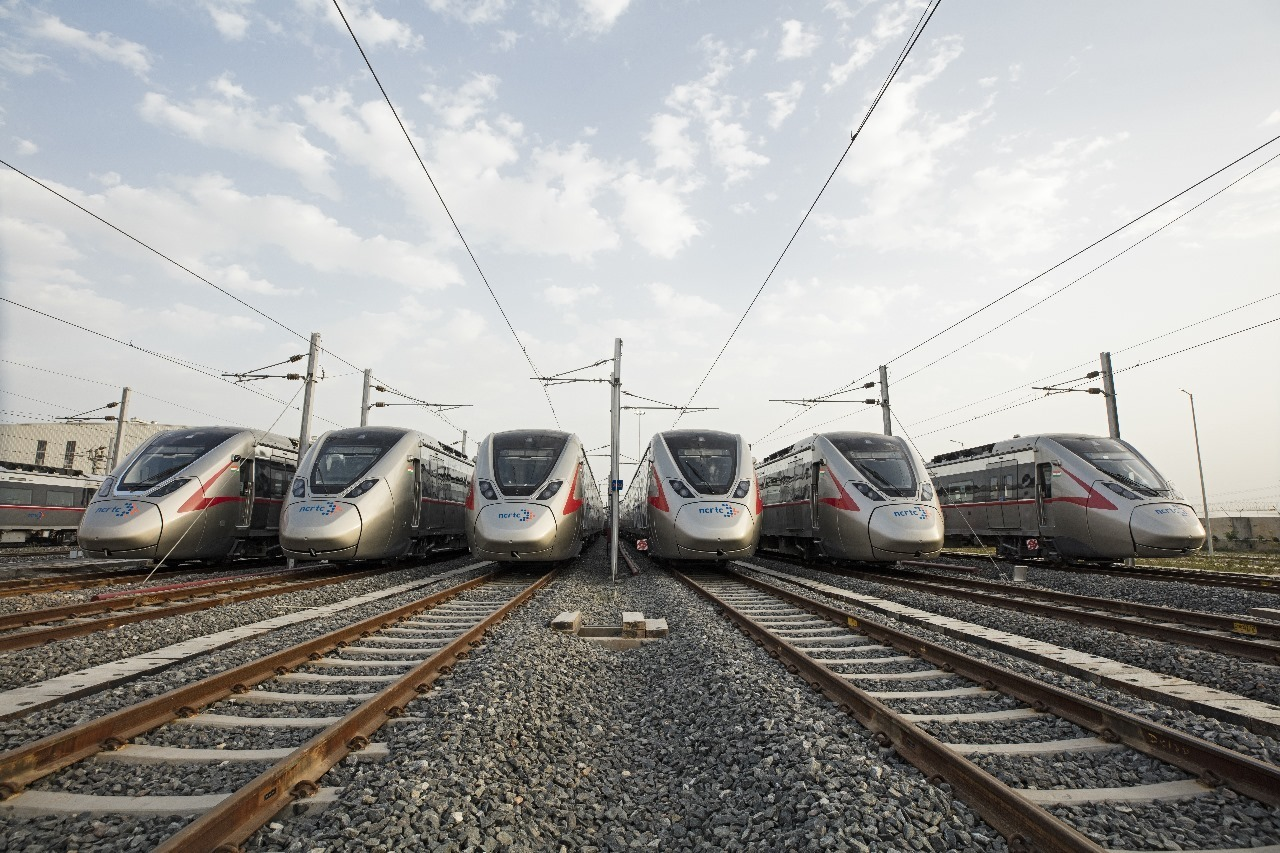
Namo Bharat trainsets parked in Duhai depot of the Delhi–Meerut Regional Rapid Transit System

On 1 May 2020, Bombardier Transportation, a French railroad manufacturing firm, emerged as the lowest bidder among a group of three bidders to supply and maintain 210 coaches for a 15-year period, with a price bid of ₹2,577 crore (US$280 million). The 210 coaches include 180 coaches consisting of 30 six-car trains for the Delhi–Meerut Regional Rapid Transit System, and 30 coaches consisting of 10 three-car trains for the Meerut Metro.

In September 2020, the NCRTC released the design of the RRTS train, which is inspired by the Lotus Temple. Designed in Hyderabad, the trains have a design speed of 180 km/h (110 mph) and an operational speed of 160 km/h (99 mph), making them the fastest rapid transit trains in India. Each fully air-conditioned, six-car trainset, which could be extended to eight coaches based on demand, consists of one premium coach and one coach reserved for women, and is be able to carry 1,750 passengers. It is compatible with a host of train protection systems like automatic train protection (ATP) and automatic train control (ATC) systems, and also has features like regenerative braking.

The entire rolling stock is being manufactured in India at Alstom's plant in Savli, Gujarat, and the first trainset was delivered to the NCRTC in May 2022. Along with the existing Delhi–Meerut corridor, these trains will run on all the three upcoming RRTS corridors, including the Ghaziabad–Jewar corridor.

=== Signalling and train control system ===
The NCRTC has decided to equip all the four upcoming RRTS corridors, along with the Meerut Metro, Noida Metro extension and the proposed Noida Film City light rail corridor with ETCS L2 signalling, one of the most advanced signalling systems used in Europe. Tenders for its procurement to install in this corridor are yet to be invited likely from Alstom, who was also awarded the contract worth approximately ₹937 crore (US$100 million) in January 2021 to supply the systems for the Delhi–Meerut Regional Rapid Transit System. All operations and trains will be controlled by RapidX in its operations control centre (OCC) on both sides of the corridor, as it will have two OCCs to look after the operations.

== Interconnectivity ==
- Key locations connected:
  - Noida Film City
  - YEIDA City
  - Noida International Airport
- Haryana Orbital Rail Corridor, a RRTS like system, will connect the Ghaziabad-Jewar RRTS to other RRTS in NCR such as Delhi–Alwar RRTS, Delhi–Sonipat RRTS, Delhi-Rohtak-Hisar RRTS and Delhi-Palwal-Hodal RRTS.
- Integration with Delhi Metro and Noida Metro: The RRTS, after starting from Ghaziabad station, will be linked with the Shaheed Sthal metro station of the Red Line of Delhi Metro, traverse through southern Ghaziabad with a stop, and then will have a total eight interchanges at Greater Noida-Sector IV, Greater Noida Sector-II, Knowledge Park V, Surajpur, Pari Chowk, YEIDA North-Sector 18, YEIDA Central-Sector 21 and Jewar Airport stations. These integrations will provide a significant impact on commuters, as they will seamlessly connect with the metros and the Namo Bharat trains of the RRTS, providing them the ease of travel from Meerut, Delhi, Noida, Ghaziabad and adjoining parts of the National Capital Region (NCR) to reach Noida International Airport within 40–50 minutes. This will make the metros the second such transit systems in India to run along and directly integrate with a regional transit system after Meerut Metro.
- RapidX: Delhi NCR's traditional train set being replaced with RRTS like trainsets.

== Future plans ==
To cater the projected mass increase in traffic along the RRTS' route after its completion, the NCRTC has made provisions in the Detailed Project Report (DPR) to add ten more metro stations in the YEIDA City section, of which there will be one RRTS and nine metro stations, and operate the metro services on RRTS infrastructure as a single integrated corridor, like that of Meerut Metro in the Delhi–Meerut Regional Rapid Transit System. The provisions have been made in view of catering the traffic of the upcoming YEIDA City and to and from the under-construction Noida International Airport in Jewar. In addition, two types of trains will also be provided–one will operate at a faster speed of about 115 km/h (71 mph) and stop on limited stations, and the other will travel at normal speed of about 90 km/h (56 mph) and stop at all RRTS stations. A long-term future plan has also been made to extend the corridor southwards along the Yamuna Expressway from YEIDA City before it turns towards Jewar Airport, till possibly Mathura or Agra, so to further integrate those cities and adjoining regions closely with the National Capital Region (NCR).

== Status updates ==
- October 2023: The plan for a corridor from Ghaziabad to Noida International Airport was first introduced by the former General of the Indian Army and an incumbent politician under the Government of Uttar Pradesh, V. K. Singh.
- December 2023: The RRTS corridor's alignment as per the NCRTC was approved by the Government of Uttar Pradesh.
- January 2024: The Yamuna Expressway Industrial Development Authority (YEIDA) directed the NCRTC to prepare the Detailed Project Report (DPR) of the corridor. Hence, the NCRTC undertook the geotechnical survey of the corridor's proposed alignment in Greater Noida in the same month.
- February 2024: It was reportedly stated that the NCRTC was preparing the DPR in its final stages, and that it would be completed by the first week of March 2024.
- April 2024: The DPR was finished and submitted by the NCRTC to the YEIDA and the Government of Uttar Pradesh for a final approval by the Governments of India, Uttar Pradesh and YEIDA.

== See also ==
- Transport in Noida
- Transport in National Capital Region
- List of metro trains in India
- Transport in India
