= Delhi–Meerut Regional Rapid Transit System =

Regional transit system in NCR, India

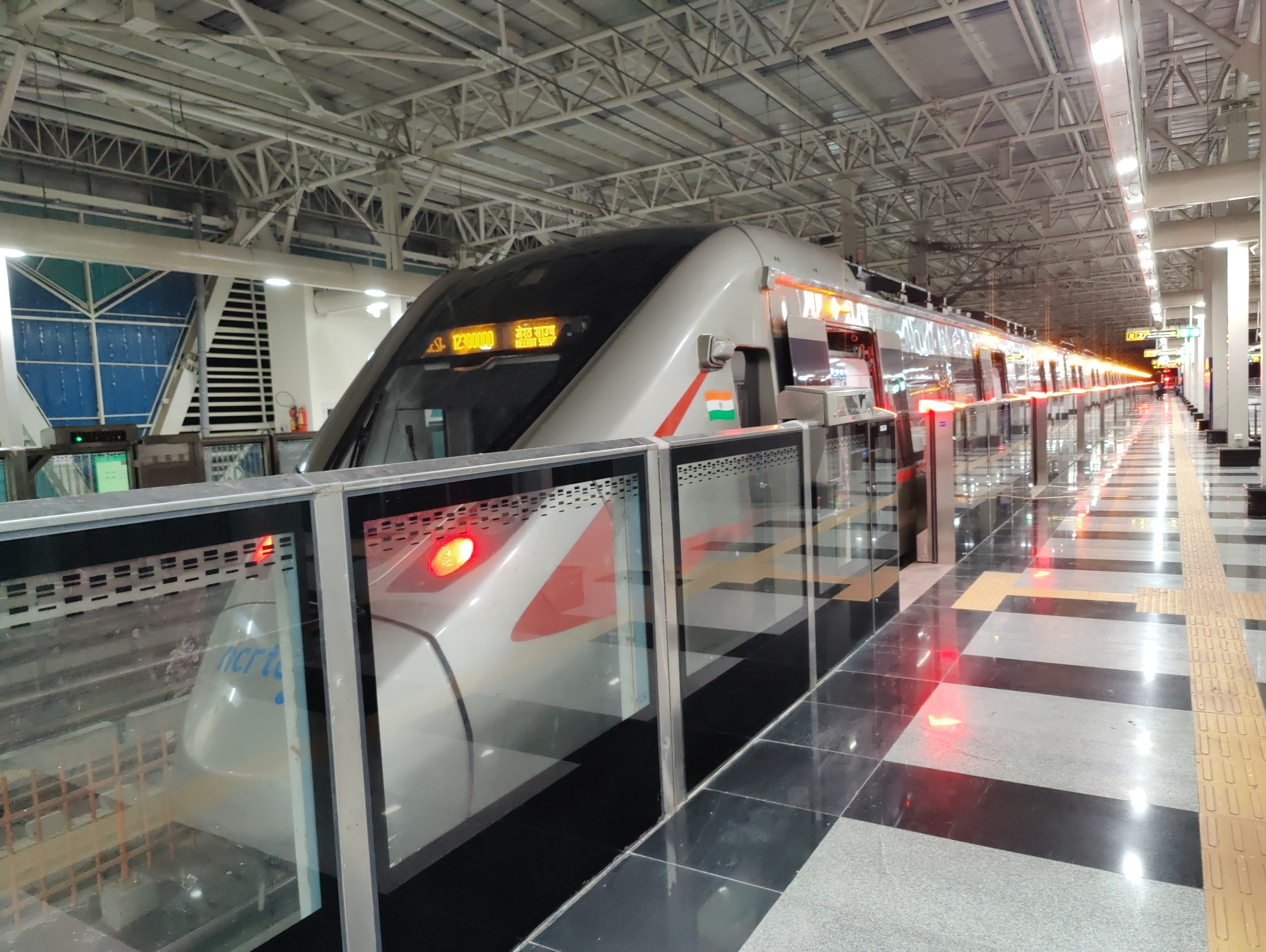
- A Namo Bharat trainset at Meerut South RRTS station

Overview
- Other name(s): Delhi–Meerut RRTS; Delhi–Ghaziabad–Meerut RRTS
- Owner: National Capital Region Transport Corporation (NCRTC)
- Locale: National Capital Region (NCR)
- Termini: Sarai Kale Khan (further extension to Jangpura (under construction)); Modipuram
- Stations: 16; 15 (operational); 1 (under construction)
- Website: ncrtc.in

Service
- Type: Semi-high speed rail Regional transit
- Services: 1
- Operator: DB RRTS Operations India Private Limited
- Depot(s): Duhai; Modipuram
- Rolling stock: Namo Bharat
- Daily ridership: 108,049 (October 2026)
- Ridership: 3,349,524 (October 2026)

History
- Opened: 20 October 2023; 3 years ago (priority corridor (Sahibabad-Duhai Depot))
- Last extension: 6 March 2024; 2 years ago (Duhai Depot–Modinagar North) 18 August 2024; 2 years ago (Modinagar North–Meerut South); 5 January 2025; 22 months ago (Sahibabad–New Ashok Nagar) 22 February 2026; 8 months ago (New Ashok Nagar–Sarai Kale Khan; Meerut South–Modipuram)
- Completed: Q3 2026

Technical
- Line length: 82.15 km (51.05 mi)
- Character: Elevated, underground and at-grade
- Track gauge: 1,435 mm (4 ft 8 1/2 in) standard gauge
- Electrification: 25 kV 50 Hz AC overhead catenary
- Operating speed: 160 km/h (100 mph) (maximum); 100 km/h (62 mph) (average)
- Signalling: ETCS L2/L3 over LTE

The Delhi–Meerut Regional Rapid Transit System, also known as Delhi–Meerut RRTS and colloquially Rapid Rail, is an 82.15 km (51.05 mi)-long semi high-speed rail regional transit corridor that connects the cities of Delhi, Ghaziabad and Meerut in the National Capital Region. It is the first of the four rapid rail corridors envisioned under the first phase of the Namo Bharat project managed by the National Capital Region Transport Corporation (NCRTC). Designed to allow a maximum speed of 180 km/h (110 mph), it uses the Namo Bharat (trainset) designed by the French rolling stock manufacturer Alstom at its engineering centre in Hyderabad, Telangana, and was manufactured in Savli, Gujarat. The train has an aerodynamic design which reduces the drag when it travels and is operated at a speed of 160 km/h (99 mph); the distance between Delhi and Meerut is traversed in less than 60 minutes. The project was developed at a cost of ₹30,274 crore (US$3.2 billion). Originating from Jangpura, the corridor will run through Sarai Kale Khan, which will serve as the terminal for the three planned corridors in Delhi, before concluding at Modipuram in Meerut. It comprises 16 stations and two depots at Duhai and Modipuram.

Construction of the Delhi–Meerut RRTS began in June 2019. Though initially planned for full commissioning by 2024, the system was beset with a series of delays and was only partially operational from October 2023 to February 2026.

Its rollout has taken place in multiple stages, starting with a 17 km priority corridor between Sahibabad and Duhai Depot that itself opened months behind schedule. Subsequent extensions to Modinagar North (6 March 2024), Meerut South (18 August 2024), and New Ashok Nagar (5 January 2025), originally planned for earlier dates in 2024 and 2025, were also delayed, missing their respective deadlines by several months. As a result, the full 82.15 km corridor from Sarai Kale Khan in Delhi to Modipuram in Meerut missed three successive deadlines for complete operationalisation.

Although all civil work, testing, and trial runs have been completed by October 2025, the remaining stretches remained unopened until February 2026. Officials had earlier stated that full operations would commence only after a formal inauguration by the Prime Minister of India.

DB RRTS Operations India, a subsidiary of Germany's Deutsche Bahn, is the corridor's operator. Upon inauguration, the RRTS became the first regional transit system of India, and has also been designated the fastest rapid transit train in the nation with an operational speed of 160 km/h (99 mph).

== Background ==
Owing to burgeoning population, traffic, congestion, pollution, and risk of accidents and mishaps in the National Capital Region, the Planning Commission constituted a task force in 2005 under the chairmanship of the secretary of the Ministry of Urban Development to develop a multi-modal regional transit system for the NCR. This was included in the Integrated Transport Plan for NCR 2032, with special emphasis on a Regional Rapid Transit System (RRTS) connecting regional centres. In 2013, the Government of India and the Government of Delhi decided to create a comprehensive plan for developing a regional railway that would connect Delhi directly with the adjoining cities and regions of the NCR and beyond. Consequently, the National Capital Region Transport Corporation was established in July 2013 as a joint venture between the Government of India and the governments of the states of Delhi, Haryana, Rajasthan, and Uttar Pradesh. The objective of this organisation is to reduce the reliance of commuters on road-based transportation and enhance regional connectivity within the NCR and beyond, and construct, own and operate the Regional Rapid Transit Systems (RRTS). Within Delhi, the RRTS systems will largely run underground, connect to the Delhi Metro and provide commuters with a faster alternative option as a last-mile connectivity avenue to reach their respective destinations. These systems will be similar to other regional transit systems in the world, like London's Crossrail, Paris' RER, and Munich's S-Bahn. Eight corridors traversing the NCR of at least 1,000 km (620 mi) were initially planned to be implemented, which subsequently swelled to nine. Of the nine, four corridors are slated for implementation in the coming years, namely the Delhi–Meerut, Delhi–Alwar, Delhi–Panipat and Ghaziabad–Jewar corridors. The Delhi–Meerut corridor was chosen to be developed first on account of high frequency of travellers and traffic between Delhi and Meerut: the Government of India, the respective state governments, and the NCRTC commissioned feasibility studies and subsequently approved the corridor's construction.

== History ==
The feasibility study and the detailed project report prepared by the National Capital Region Transport Corporation were approved by the Government of Uttar Pradesh in May 2017. In February 2019, the Government of India approved the project's implementation, and also approved the funding of ₹30,274 crore (US$3.2 billion). On 8 March 2019, the foundation stone for the corridor and the Meerut Metro project were laid: construction for both the projects commenced in June 2019. The metro has been tacked along the RRTS route in Meerut to provide local connectivity, covering 21 km (13.0 mi). The NCRTC planned for the 17 km (10.6 mi)-long priority section between Sahibabad and Duhai Depot to begin regular operations by March 2023. However, due to pending work at certain stations, especially in Ghaziabad, the project faced delays. As a result, it was inaugurated and opened on 20 October 2023. In July 2022, the NCRTC selected Deutsche Bahn, the national railway company of Germany, to operate and maintain the corridor for twelve years with a further five years' option, as part of the contract. Hence, after the inauguration of the corridor, the company formed a subsidiary named DB RRTS Operations India. The NCRTC christened the provider of the services and trains RapidX and Namo Bharat respectively.

In December 2023, after conducting trials runs on another 25 km (15.5 mi)-long section between Duhai Depot and Meerut South, the NCRTC announced that the section would likely be opened by March 2024, thereby taking the operational length to about 42 km (26.1 mi). The section was later extended to Modinagar North on 6 March 2024, to Meerut South on 18 August 2024, and to New Ashok Nagar on 5 January 2025, gradually increasing the operational length to around 34 km (21.1 mi), 42 km (26.1 mi), and finally 55 km (34.2 mi). The construction of the final 16.6 km (10.3 mi)-long section from Sarai Kale Khan to New Ashok Nagar, which traverses the Yamuna river, concluded by June 2025.

In November 2021, the NCRTC decided to build a station in Jangpura, Delhi, to serve as the terminating station of the corridor. Per the original plan, it was envisioned to establish a stabling yard and operations control centre at Sarai Kale Khan, thence managing the three corridors originating there. However, the Jangpura station was floated to provide connectivity to the RRTS for residents of Jangpura and nearby areas, more so owing to the congestion along Mathura Road. With this addition, the total number of stations on the corridor increased to 16. The station will be at grade and is expected to be completed and opened after the rest of the corridor. The rest of the corridor till Modipuram is expected be operational by July 2025.

Following the Galwan Valley skirmish on 15 June 2020, there were calls by the Swadeshi Jagaran Manch for the government to cancel the bid of a Chinese firm involved in constructing and manufacturing the trains of the RRTS. Although the Chinese company did not abstain from constructing a tunnel segment of the RRTS, it was determined that the trains would be constructed by another firm. On this account, a fresh bid was conducted by the NCRTC: Bombardier Transportation, a Canadian-German rolling stock manufacturer, won the bid to make the trains for the RRTS and the Meerut Metro. The company will supply 210 coaches consisting of 30 trainsets with six coaches each, which could be extended to eight coaches based on demand. The trains are being manufactured at the company's plant in Savli, Gujarat.

== Route ==
Of the entire length, 68.03 km (42.27 mi) is elevated, 14.12 km (8.77 mi) is underground and the remaining 1.45 km (0.90 mi) segment is at-grade for connections to two depots, located at Duhai and Modipuram. In the densely populated suburbs of Delhi and Meerut, the route runs underground. The entire route is designed for a maximum speed of 180 km/h (112 mph), with an operating speed of 160 km/h (99 mph). The average speed is approximately 100 km/h (62 mph).

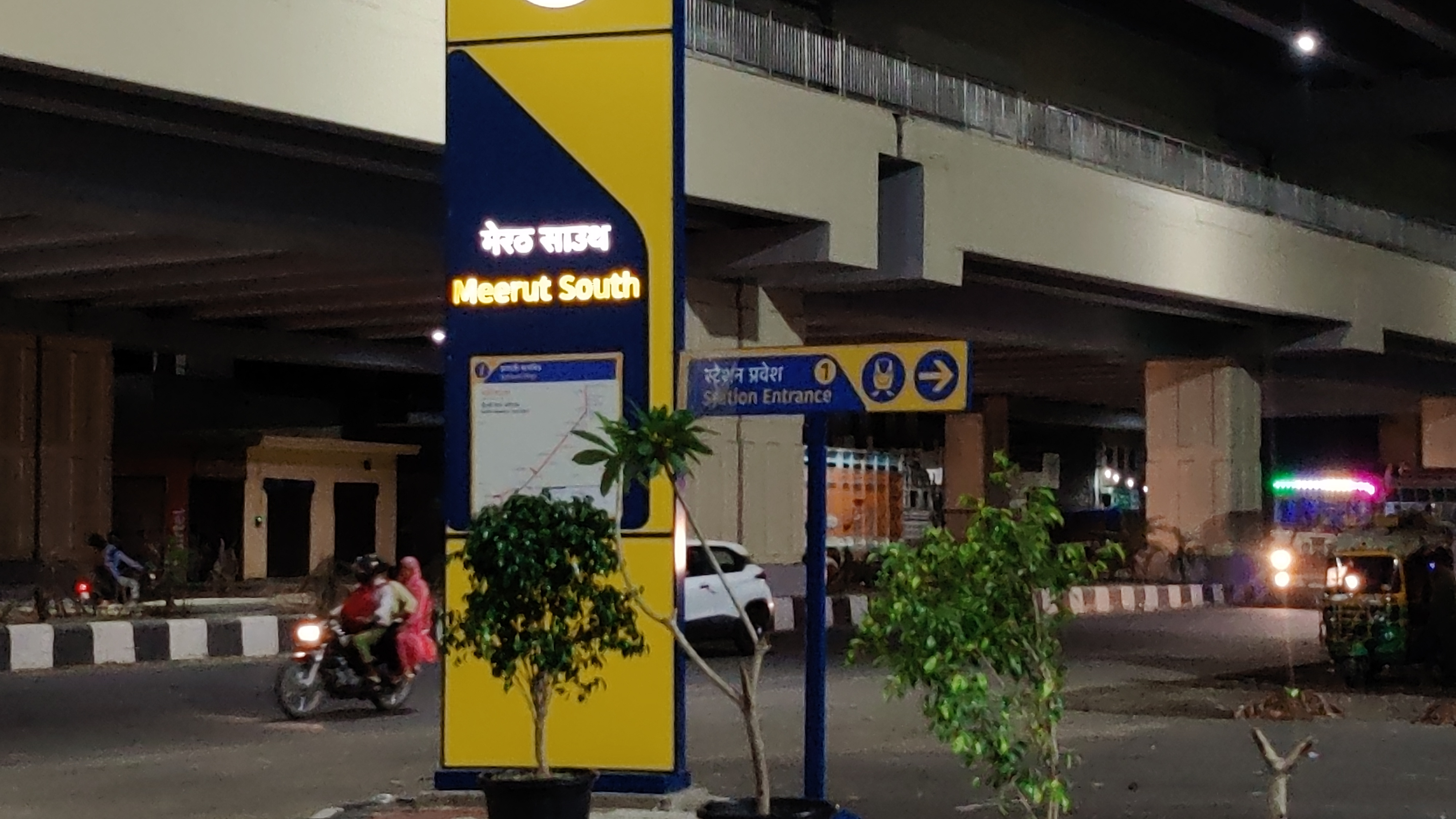
Meerut South RRTS station

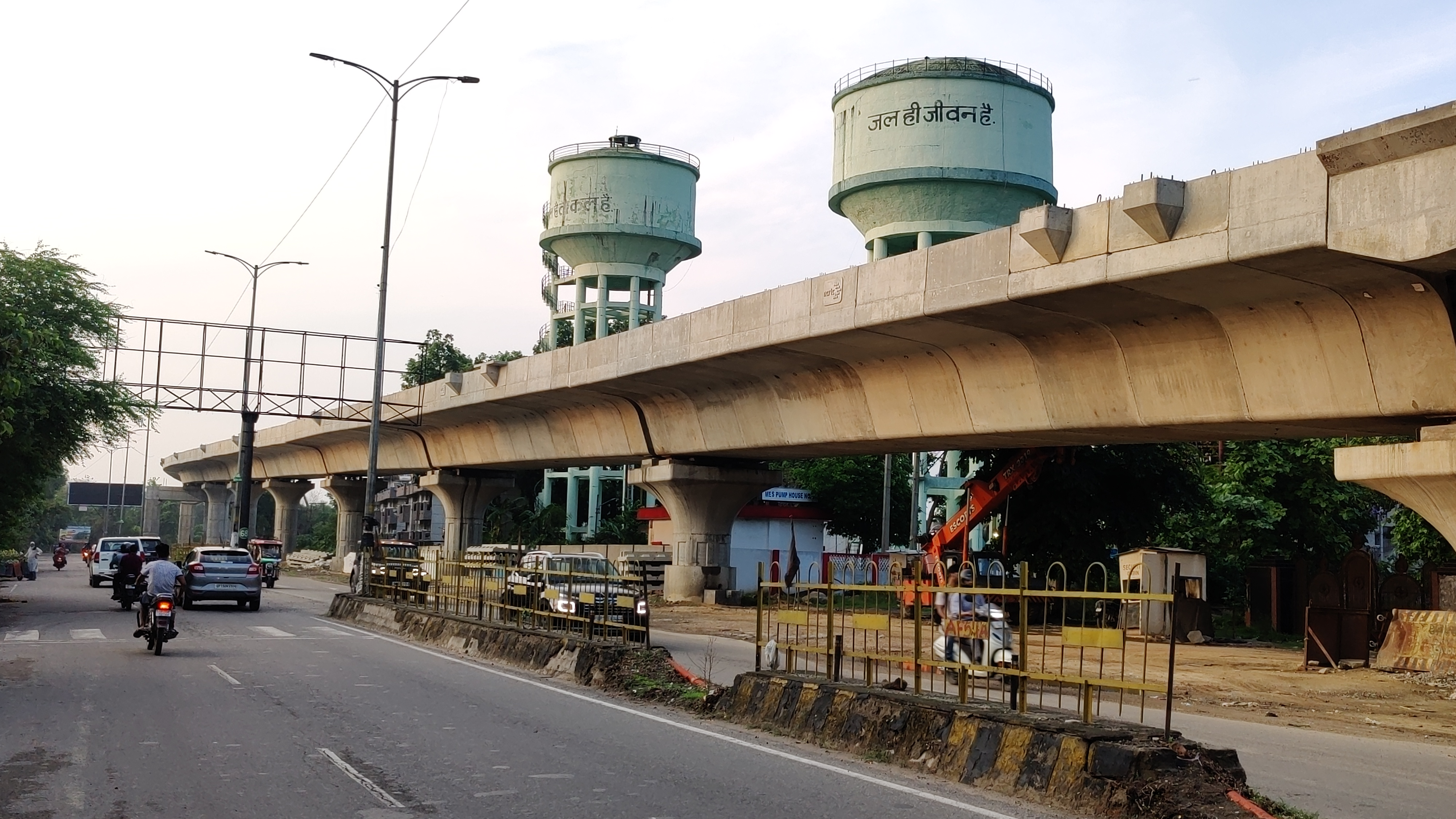
Delhi-Meerut RRTS line under construction at Roorkee Road in Meerut

Although the corridor is planned to originate at Jangpura, it currently begins at Sarai Kale Khan station, as the Jangpura station remains under construction. Sarai Kale Khan serves as the terminal station for all the planned corridors in the area. The corridor passes through various suburbs of Delhi and Ghaziabad before terminating at Modipuram in Meerut. The Sarai Kale Khan station is the largest of all the stations, featuring three levels, six platforms, and six tracks to serve the three corridors to Meerut, Panipat and Alwar. Due to its terminal status and location, it serves as a multi-modal transport hub by facilitating direct connectivity with the adjoining transport systems and facilities in its vicinity, like the Sarai Kale Khan-Nizamuddin metro station of the Delhi Metro, the Sarai Kale Khan Inter-State Bus Terminus, and the Hazrat Nizamuddin railway station.

The Anand Vihar station of the corridor hosts a similar strategic value owing to its adjacency to the Anand Vihar Terminal railway station, whereas the Ghaziabad station serves as another hub for interconnectivity with three more proposed corridors: Ghaziabad–Jewar, Ghaziabad–Bulandshahr–Khurja and Ghaziabad–Hapur.

Since January 2025, only a limited stretch of the corridor (55 km (34.18 mi)-long) spanning from New Ashok Nagar in Delhi to Meerut South section was operational. The section spanning from Sarai Kale Khan to New Ashok Nagar was plagued by successive delays, and only became operational in February 2026; with this, the whole corridor became functional.

== Construction ==
The National Capital Region Transport Corporation divided the civil construction work of the RRTS project into eight packages and 30 packages for all stations, ramps, tunnel sections and technical facilities, consisting of 16 stations and two depots. Of the eight packages, two packages in the Meerut section are also part of the Meerut Metro project. The list of all packages, their contractors, and statuses is as follows:

Phases	Description	Opening	Status
1	Sahibabad to Duhai Depot	October 2023	Completed
2	Duhai Depot to Meerut South	March–August 2024	Completed
3	Sarai Kale Khan to Sahibabad	January 2025	Completed
4	Meerut South to Modipuram Depot	June 2025	Partially completed (Note: Modipuram metro station and depot are under construction as of November 2026.)

Note: Package-1 and Package-2 are part of the priority section of the RRTS, and Package-7 and Package-8 are part of the Meerut Metro.

Package	Description	No. of stations	Contractor(s)	Status
1	Sahibabad Ramp – Ghaziabad Station	2 (elevated)	KEC International and China Civil Engineering Construction Corp. (JV)	Completed
2	Ghaziabad Station – Duhai EPE crossing	2 (elevated)	Apco Infratech and China Railway First Group (JV)	Completed
3	Muradnagar, Modinagar South, Modinagar North, Meerut South, Partapur, Rithani and Shatabdi Nagar	7 (elevated)	L&T Heavy Civil Infrastructure	Completed
4	New Ashok Nagar Ramp – Anand Vihar – Sahibabad Ramp	1 (underground)	Shanghai Tunnel Engineering Co. (STEC)	Completed
5A	Duhai Depot and Workshop (at-grade,	1 (Depot)	Vijay Nirman Co. and KEC International (JV)	Completed
5B	Modipuram Depot and Workshop	1 (at-grade)	KSM Bashir Mohammad & Sons	Under construction
6	Sarai Kale Khan and New Ashok Nagar	2 (underground and elevated)	Afcons Infrastructure	Completed
7	Shatabdi Nagar–Brahmapuri Down Ramp–Brahmapuri–Begumpul Down Ramp–MES Colony, Daurli, Meerut North and Modipuram	5 (underground and elevated)	L&T Heavy Civil Infrastructure	Completed
8	Brahmapuri Down Ramp–Meerut Central, Bhaisali and Begumpul RRTS station–Begumpul Up Ramp	3 (underground)	Afcons Infrastructure	Completed
9A	Multistoried Staff Quarters and Connectivity		Sam India Builtwell	Under Construction
9B	Construction of Jangpura stabling yard, Operation control center (OCC) and associated buildings			Bidding process underway

The foundation stone for the project was laid in March 2019, and construction began in June 2019. The project's first phase—the priority corridor spanning 17 kilometres (10.56 mi) from Sahibabad to Duhai Depot—was expected to become operational by March 2023. However, owing to more work arising at certain stations, particularly in Ghaziabad, it exceeded its planned timeline. It was eventually inaugurated on 20 October 2023. The entirety of the corridor running from Sarai Kale Khan to Meerut, which was previously claimed to be rendered operational by September 2025, only commenced functioning from February 2026.

The operational span of the corridor was extended in stages. On 6 March 2024, it was extended to Modinagar North from Duhai Depot, increasing the total length to about 34 km (21.13 miles)). The extension reached Meerut South on 18 August 2024, bringing the operational length to around 42 km (26.10 miles). Eventually, the corridor was extended to New Ashok Nagar on 5 January 2025, increasing the total operational length to approximately 55 km (34.18 miles). On 22 February 2026, the corridor was extended to Sarai Kale Khan in Delhi and Modipuram in Uttar Pradesh, thereby extending to its fully-planned length spanning 82.15 km (51.05 miles).

== Facilities ==
In November 2023, the National Capital Region Transport Corporation introduced a mobile app called RRTS Connect that allows passengers to book tickets. The NCRTC introduced a "one-tap ticketing" feature through the RRTS Connect app. This provision allows commuters to generate a QR code from anywhere within 300 meters of an RRTS station, without needing to select a destination.

In May 2024, NCRTC announced plans to install electric vehicle charging points at all stations along the entire corridor, with the first charging points being launched at the Sahibabad station.

== Ridership ==
After commencing operations in October 2023 on the 17 km (11 mi) stretch from Sahibabad to Duhai Depot, the initial ridership of the RRTS ranged between 2,500 and 3,000 passengers per day. In May 2024, after the extension of the corridor by 17 km (11 mi) from Duhai Depot to Modinagar North in March 2024, bringing the total operational length to about 34 km (21 mi), ridership increased to around 12,000 passengers per day, nearly five times the previous figure. The corridor also surpassed one million passengers since its opening in October 2023 in the same month. In December 2024, following the opening till Meerut South in August 2024, this record surpassed 5 million, with a daily ridership of almost 22,000 passengers. With the entire 82.15 km (51.05 mi)-long corridor from Sarai Kale Khan to Modipuram becoming operational in February 2026, the record touched a new height of over 100,000 passengers per day in June 2026. It is slated to soar to 800,000 daily.

Monthly ridership	Jan	Feb	Mar	Apr	May	Jun	Jul	Aug	Sep	Oct	Nov	Dec
2023	-	-	-	-	-	-	-	-	-	63,970	72,016	72,513
2024	99,935	92,341	256,868	285,829	339,852	370,078	455,050	542,896	621,967	613,776	658,657	678,762
2025	938,652	1,001,956	1,092,404	1,164,288	1,232,152	1,221,235	1,479,598	1,473,737	1,504,669	1,534,233	1,566,674	1,631,041
2026	1,641,564	1,775,182	2,718,143	2,770,931	2,910,205	3,061,143	2,942,960	3,524,951	3,241,310	3,349,524		

Source: RRTS official website

Average daily ridership	Jan	Feb	Mar	Apr	May	Jun	Jul	Aug	Sep	Oct	Nov	Dec
2023	-	-	-	-	-	-	-	-	-	2,063	2,400	2,339
2024	3,223	3,297	8,286	9,527	10,962	12,335	14,679	17,512	20,732	19,799	21,955	21,895
2025	30,279	35,784	35,238	38,809	39,746	40,707	47,728	47,539	50,155	49,491	52,222	52,614
2026	52,953	63,399	87,682	92,364	93,877	102,038	94,934	113,708	108,043	108,049		

Source: RRTS official website

== Stations ==
The RRTS corridor will originate from Jangpura—where construction is currently underway—and take its course from Sarai Kale Khan: both stations are located in Delhi. Thereafter, it runs through Ghaziabad—whence three more corridors to Jewar, Hapur, and Khurja have been proposed to connect the nearby towns and cities lying in Uttar Pradesh with the National Capital Region—and terminates at Meerut. The corridor includes 16 stations, with 9 additional stations serving as intermediate stops for the Meerut Metro, where the RapidX services will not stop. However, there are stations—Meerut South, Shatabdi Nagar, Begumpul, and Modipuram—where the RRTS and Meerut Metro are integrated, allowing stops for both services. The corridor currently has 15 stations and one depot functional, with the Jangpura station currently under construction. The stations' exterior designs are inspired by the hue of the plumage of the peacock, the national bird of India. The following list outlines the stations, their integration with existing transport modes and their statuses.

Delhi–Meerut RRTS
No.	Station Code	Station Name		Integration	Station Layout	Platform Level Type	Status	Opening
No.	Station Code	English	Hindi	Integration	Station Layout	Platform Level Type	Status	Opening
1		Jangpura	जंगपुरा	None	At-grade	Side	Under-Construction	-
2		Sarai Kale Khan	सराय काले खान	Pink Line; Hazrat Nizamuddin; Sarai Kale Khan ISBT	Elevated	Side/Island	Operational	22 February 2026
3		New Ashok Nagar	न्यू अशोक नगर	Blue Line	Elevated	Side	Operational	5 January 2025
4		Anand Vihar	आनंद विहार	Blue Line; Pink Line; Anand Vihar Terminal; Anand Vihar ISBT	Underground	Island	Operational	5 January 2025
5		Sahibabad	साहिबाबाद	None	Elevated	Side	Operational	20 October 2023
6		Ghaziabad	ग़ाज़ियाबाद	Red Line	Elevated	Side/Island	Operational	20 October 2023
7		Guldhar	गुलधर	None	Elevated	Side	Operational	20 October 2023
8		Duhai	दुहाई	None	Elevated	Side	Operational	20 October 2023
9		Duhai Depot	दुहाई डिपो	None	At-grade	Side	Operational	20 October 2023
10		Murad Nagar	मुराद नगर	None	Elevated	Side	Operational	6 March 2024
11		Modinagar South	मोदीनगर दक्षिण	None	Elevated	Side	Operational	6 March 2024
12		Modinagar North	मोदीनगर उत्तर	None	Elevated	Side	Operational	6 March 2024
13		Meerut South	मेरठ दक्षिण	MRTS Line	Elevated	Side	Operational	18 August 2024
14		Shatabdi Nagar	शताब्दी नगर	MRTS Line	Elevated	Side	Operational	22 February 2026
15		Begumpul	बेगमपुल	MRTS Line	Underground	Island	Operational	22 February 2026
16		Modipuram	मोदीपुरम	MRTS Line	Elevated	Side	Operational	22 February 2026

== Rolling stock ==
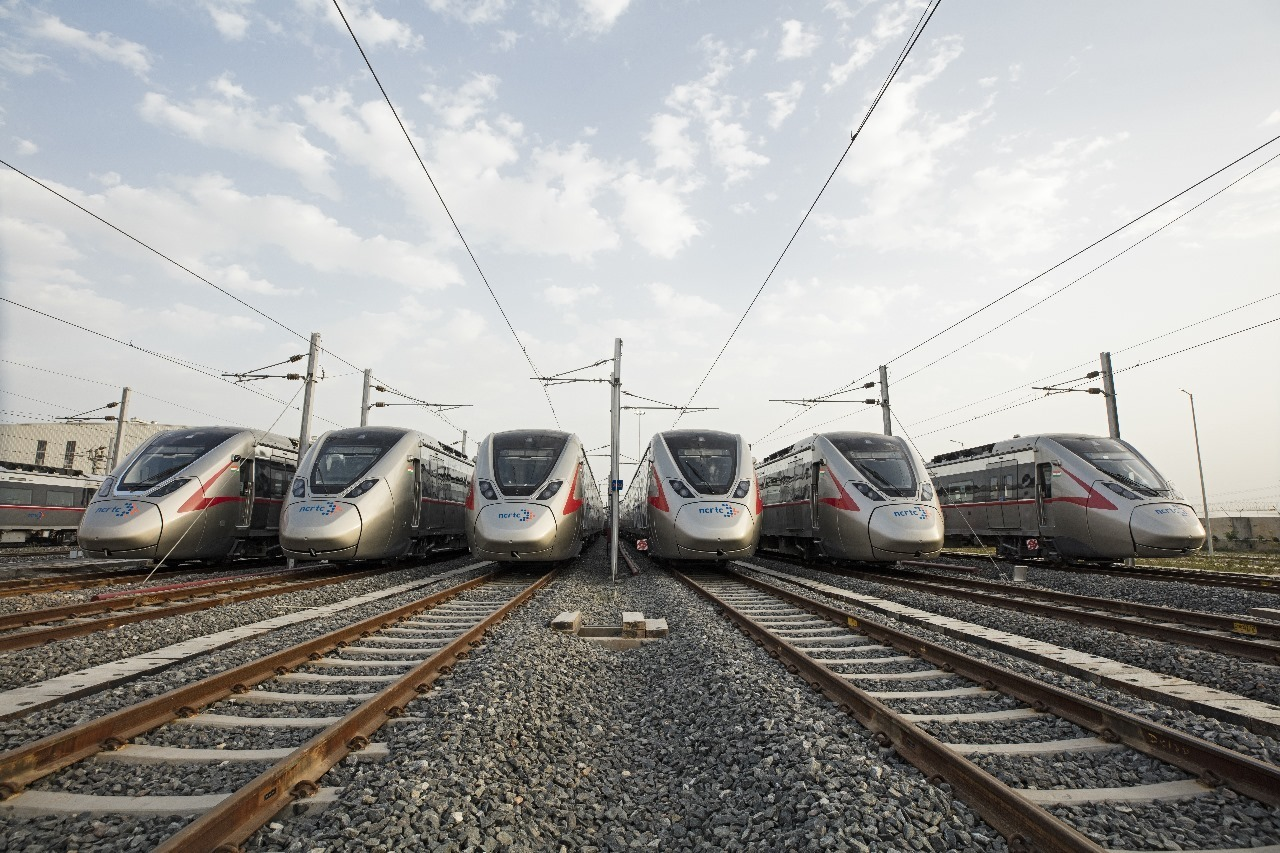
Namo Bharat trainsets parked in Duhai depot

On 1 May 2020, Bombardier Transportation, a Canadian-German rolling stock firm, emerged as the lowest bidder amongst a group of three bidders to supply and maintain 210 coaches for a period of fifteen years, with a price bid of ₹2,577 crore (US$280 million). The 210 coaches include 180 coaches, comprising 30 six-car trains for the RRTS, and 30 coaches consisting of 10 three-car trains for the Meerut Metro.

In September 2020, the National Capital Region Transport Corporation unveiled the design of the RRTS trainset, which is inspired by the Lotus Temple. Designed in Hyderabad, the trains have a design speed of 180 km/h (110 mph) and an operational speed of 160 km/h (99 mph), making them the fastest rapid transit trains in India. Each fully air-conditioned, six-car trainset, which could be extended to eight coaches based on demand, consists of one premium coach and one coach reserved for women, and has a capacity of 1,750 passengers. It is compatible with a host of train protection systems like automatic train protection and automatic train control systems, and also features regenerative braking.

The trains were named Namo Bharat after the inauguration of the corridor.

The rolling stock are manufactured in India at Alstom's plant in Savli, Gujarat, and the first trainset was delivered to the NCRTC in May 2022. As of January 2025, of the 30 trains of the RRTS, more than 15 trains have been received and are in operation.

== Integration with Delhi Metro and Meerut Metro ==
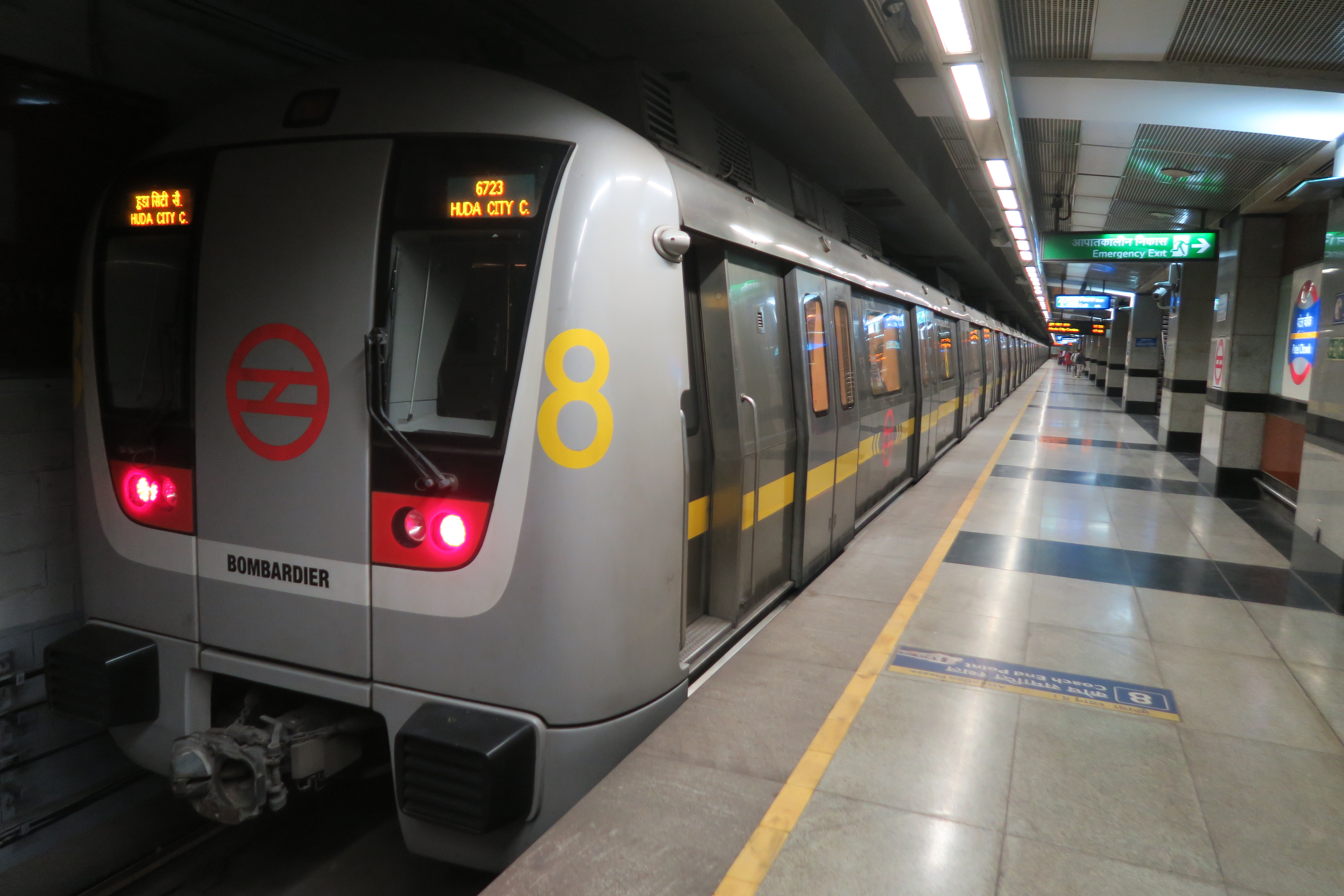
A train of the Yellow Line of the Delhi Metro

The RRTS, after originating from Jangpura, is connected to the Delhi Metro's Pink Line at Sarai Kale Khan before taking its course towards Meerut. Thereafter, it has an interchange with the Blue Line at New Ashok Nagar, a second connection to the Pink Line and Blue Line at Anand Vihar, and a third interchange with the Red Line at Ghaziabad. Thereafter, the RRTS boasts of three stations in the Meerut section—with interchanges with the Meerut Metro at Shatabdi Nagar, Begumpul and Modipuram—whereafter it shares its trains with that of the Meerut Metro at Modipuram depot. In the metro's first phase, the first line will run parallel to the RRTS tracks on both sides. Four of its 13 stations—Modipuram, Begumpul, Shatabdi Nagar, and Meerut South—will be integrated with the RRTS, allowing seamless connections between the metro and Namo Bharat trains. This will provide commuters with easy travel within Meerut and connections to Delhi, Noida, Ghaziabad, and other parts of the National Capital Region. This makes the metro the first metro in India to run along and directly integrate with a regional transit system.

== Signalling and train control system ==
The corridors of the RRTS and the Meerut Metro are equipped with ETCS L2 signalling, a signalling system ubiquitous in Europe. Tenders for its procurement were invited in April 2020: Alstom was awarded the contract worth approximately ₹937 crore (US$100 million) in January 2021. All operations and trains are controlled by RapidX from its operations control centre at Duhai Depot. After the completion of the second OCC at Jangpura, the corridor will have two OCCs to look after the operations.

Nokia partnered with Alstom to implement the 4.9G/LTE private wireless network to support the ETCS L2 signalling. This is the first instance globally of an LTE network being integrated with ETCS L2 signalling. In July 2024, the ETCS L3 signalling as its hybrid form was commissioned along the corridor.

== Future plans ==
In January 2024, the National Capital Region Transport Corporation drafted a plan to extend the RRTS corridor from its terminating point in Meerut to Haridwar via Muzaffarnagar. NCRTC officials stated that, if the plan is implemented, the travel time from Delhi to Haridwar would be reduced to just 2 hours, compared to the current 3–4 hours by road and 5–6 hours by rail. The officials decided to conduct a physical survey of the proposed section to assess the feasibility and execution of the project. A detailed project report will be prepared to further analyse the practicality of the corridor.

== Sustainability measures ==
The project will install 25,000 solar panels on station and depot rooftops, generating 11 MW of electricity and reducing carbon dioxide emissions by 615 tonnes annually, totalling 15,375 tonnes over 25 years. Of the 25,000 panels, 16 stations in the Meerut Metro section will each receive approximately 1,100 panels, while the remaining nine stations will receive around 400 panels. The solar panels are expected to meet 70% of the energy demand. With reduced friction and reliance on rail-based transit, the corridor will consume one-fifth the fossil fuel of road vehicles. Water recycling, rainwater harvesting, and sewage treatment systems are also being implemented to promote conservation. These measures will reduce carbon dioxide emissions by an estimated 250,000 tonnes annually and conserve water.

== In popular culture ==
- The RRTS project, officials of the National Capital Region Transport Corporation, and experts were featured in the Engineering Marvels: RRTS of the History TV18 on 27 November 2023.

== Status updates ==
- Jun 2019: Pillar construction work started on both the RRTS and the Meerut Metro by Larsen & Toubro.
- May 2020: Bombardier Transportation, now acquired by Alstom, won the contract for manufacturing 210 trains for the RRTS and the Meerut Metro.
- Oct 2020: Civil construction work on about 50 km (31 mi) between Sahibabad and Shatabdi Nagar was in progress.
- Feb 2021: The construction of the Anand Vihar station of the RRTS just beside the Anand Vihar Terminal railway station began.
- Apr 2021: Track laying started for the Ghaziabad section of the corridor.
- Jun 2021: The first elevated section pier (namely for the Sarai Kale Khan section) was constructed.
- Jun 2021: Construction work on the first part of the underground portion of began in Anand Vihar.
- Jul 2021: The piers were completed for the 24 km (15 mi) elevated stretch.
- Jul 2021: Alstom began manufacturing the 210 trains for the RRTS and the Meerut Metro. These are being manufactured in Alstom's plant in Savli, Gujarat.
- Mar 2022: The tunneling work for the underground section of the RRTS in Meerut began.
- Mar 2022: Paytm Payments Bank won the bid for becoming the financial institution responsible for the fare system, beating the State Bank of India (SBI).
- Apr 2022: Roughly 25% of the corridor was completed.
- May 2022: Alstom manufactured and delivered the first train to the NCRTC from Savli, Gujarat.
- Aug 2022: First trial of the first trainset had been successfully completed.
- Feb 2023: The trial runs for the trains, including high-speed tests, had been completed, and now there were a total of six trains. The 17-km priority corridor from Sahibabad to Duhai was at its final stages of work, and was confirmed to be opened by mid-June 2023. The second stretch from Duhai to Meerut South would be opened by the first quarter of 2024, and the entire corridor would become operational by March 2025.
- Aug 2023: The entire tunneling work of the RRTS was fully completed.
- Oct 2023: The priority corridor from Sahibabad to Duhai was inaugurated on 20 October 2023.
- Dec 2023: The trial run on the 25-km stretch from Duhai to Meerut South was conducted.
- Feb 2024: The NCRTC announced that the 25-km stretch from Duhai to Meerut South will become operational by March 2024, thereby increasing the operational length to 42 km. The RRTS and the Meerut Metro projects are both on track to be completed by June 2025.
- Mar 2024: Of the 25 km-long stretch from Duhai Depot to Meerut South, the 17-km stretch till Modinagar North was inaugurated on 6 March 2024, thus bringing the current operational length to 34 km. The Meerut South station will be completed by the first half of May 2024.
- Aug 2024: Of the 25 km-long stretch from Duhai Depot to Meerut South, the 8-km section from Modinagar North to Meerut South was opened on 18 August 2024. Of the total 82 km long corridor, more than 80 km has been completed, and the opening of the section from Sahibabad till Sarai Kale Khan is on track to be completed by December 2024.
- Jan 2025: A 13-km long stretch between Sahibabad and New Ashok Nagar was inaugurated on 5 January 2025, thus connecting Delhi with the corridor.
- May 2025: NCRTC has completed the installation of all 169 track km (TKM) of precast slab track.
- February 2026: Entire stretch of the RRTS from Sarai Kale Khan to Modipuram becomes operational on 22 February 2026.

== See also ==
- National Capital Region Transport Corporation
- Meerut Metro
- Commuter rail
- Delhi–Alwar Regional Rapid Transit System
- Delhi–Panipat Regional Rapid Transit System
- Ghaziabad–Jewar Regional Rapid Transit System
- Namo Bharat
- Alstom
- Transport in India
- List of metro cities in India
- Transport in National Capital Region
- Transport in Meerut
- History TV18
- Over-the-top media service
