= Guldhar RRTS station =

RapidX's Delhi–Meerut RRTS station

DPS Rajnagar Guldhar

General information
- Location: Meerut Road Industrial Area, Ghaziabad, Uttar Pradesh 201017; India
- Coordinates: 28.69956°N 77.44582°E
- System: Namo Bharat RRTS station
- Owner: NCRTC
- Operator: NCRTC
- Line: Delhi–Meerut RRTS
- Platforms: Side platform Platform-1 → Duhai Depot / Modipuram; Platform-2 → Sarai Kale Khan
- Tracks: 2

Construction
- Structure type: Elevated, Double track
- Platform levels: 2
- Parking: Four-Wheeler Parking
- Accessible: Yes

Other information
- Status: Operational

History
- Opened: 21 October 2023; 2 years ago
- Electrified: 25 kV 50 Hz AC through overhead catenary

Services
Preceding station	Namo Bharat	Following station
Ghaziabad towards Sarai Kale Khan	Delhi–Meerut	Duhai towards Duhai Depot or Modipuram
Route map
Location

DPS Rajnagar Guldhar RRTS station (formerly known as Guldhar) is an elevated RRTS station in the Ghaziabad district of Uttar Pradesh, India. This serves as a RRTS station for higher-speed trains on the Delhi–Meerut Regional Rapid Transit System that reaches speeds of up to 180 km/h.

DPS Rajnagar Guldhar RRTS station was commissioned on 20 October 2023 by Prime Minister Narendra Modi along with the 17 km long Sahibad-Duhaiyya section of Delhi–Meerut RRTS and was open to general public on 21 October 2023.

== History ==
The National Capital Region Transport Corporation (NCRTC) had invited tenders for the construction of the DPS Rajnagar Guldhar RRTS station along with the 4.5 km long Guldhar–Duhai section of the 82.15 km Delhi-Meerut RRTS line. Apco Infratech and China Railway First Group (JV) emerged as the lowest bidder for construction work. Under the agreement, companies started construction of Guldhar RRTS station.

== Station layout ==
The DPS Rajnagar Guldhar RRTS station has three levels - platform, concourse and street level. Guldhar RRTS station will be 215 meters long and 26 meters wide. The rail tracks will be constructed at a height of 24 meters above the ground level.

G	Street level	Exit/Entrance
L1	Mezzanine	Fare control, Station agent, Token vending machines, Crossover
L2	Side platform | Doors will open on the left
L2	Platform 1 Eastbound	Towards → Duhai Depot / Modipuram; Next Station: Duhai
L2	Platform 2 Westbound	Towards ← Sarai Kale Khan; Next Station: Ghaziabad
L2	Side platform | Doors will open on the left
L2

There are 2 Gate points – 1 and 2. Commuters can use either of the points for their travel:-

- Gate 1 - Towards Raj Kumar Goel Institute of Technology (Meerut Side)
- Gate 2 - Towards Delhi Side
