= New Ashok Nagar RRTS station =

RapidX's Delhi–Meerut RRTS station

New Ashok Nagar
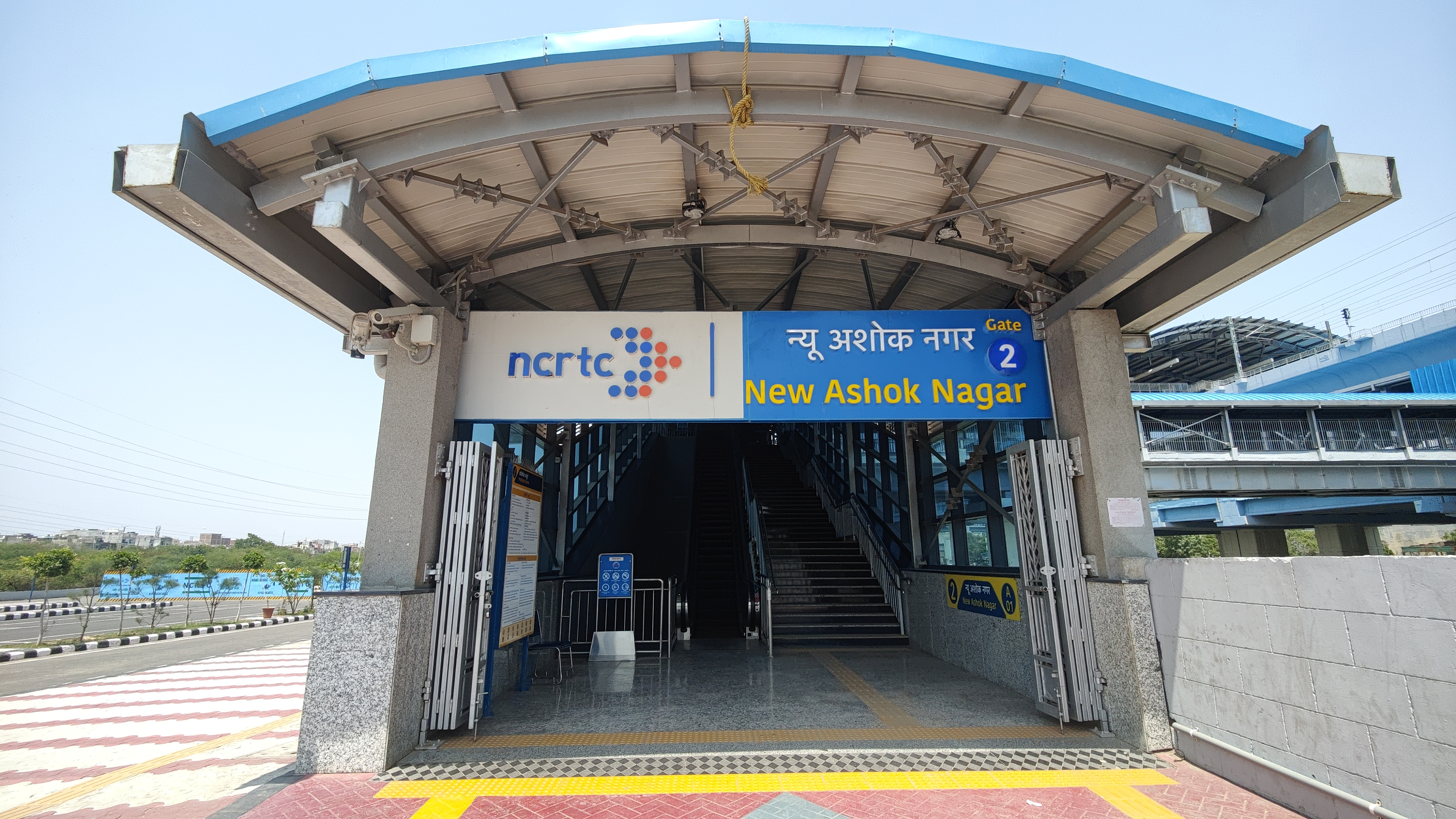
- New Ashok Nagar RRTS station entry gate

General information
- Location: New Ashok Nagar, New Delhi, Delhi, India
- Coordinates: 28.5907336°N 77.3021040°E
- System: Namo Bharat RRTS station
- Owner: National Capital Region Transport Corporation (NCRTC)
- Operator: RapidX
- Line: Delhi–Meerut
- Platforms: Side platform Platform-1 → Modipuram; Platform-2 → Sarai Kale Khan
- Tracks: 2
- Connections: Blue Line New Ashok Nagar

Construction
- Structure type: Elevated, Double track
- Parking: Yes

Other information
- Status: Operational

History
- Opened: 5 January 2025; 19 months ago
- Electrified: 25 kV 50 Hz AC through overhead catenary

Services
Preceding station	Namo Bharat	Following station
Sarai Kale Khan Terminus	Delhi–Meerut	Anand Vihar towards Modipuram
Route map
Location
- Interactive map

The New Ashok Nagar RRTS station is an elevated terminal semi-high-speed rail station located in New Ashok Nagar, New Delhi, India. It is the second station of the Delhi–Meerut Regional Rapid Transit System operated by RapidX, after the terminus station, Sarai Kale Khan. Trains at this station operate at speeds of up to 180 km/h, offering rapid transit along the corridor.

Construction on the station begun in January 2021, and became operational on 5 January 2025. It is a key station for serving New Ashok Nagar and adjoining areas with seamless connectivity, further stimulated by the existing Delhi Metro's New Ashok Nagar metro station, located just a hundred metres from the RRTS station. To ensure connectivity with it, the station has been built with an extended level as the concourse area below the viaduct running above for a walkway to the metro station, and for more enhanced passenger experience, with the help of multiple shops and other facilities.

== History ==
The National Capital Region Transport Corporation (NCRTC) invited bids for construction of the station as part of the Delhi–Meerut Regional Rapid Transit System's Package 6 in February 2020. Then, Afcons Infrastructure won the bid in September 2020. Construction began, including on the station, from January 2021, with a deadline of completion by 30 months or 2.5 years. However, due to land acquisition and restrictions that lasted until early 2022, the same got extended by around another 2.5 years, with the deadline set to December 2024. The structural work on the station along with the approaching viaduct with tracks on both sides were completed by October 2024, after which trial runs commenced from Sahibabad to New Ashok Nagar in the same month. After multiple trial runs and finishing works, it was announced that the stretch till New Ashok Nagar would inaugurated by 29 December 2024. Unfortunately, owing to the passing of former Prime Minister Manmohan Singh, a 7-day national mourning was announced by the Government of India to honour him, and hence, all inaugurations and governmental works were suspended for 7 days. Therefore, the inauguration date of the stretch was rescheduled to 5 January 2025, eventually conducted by Prime Minister Narendra Modi on the same day, after which operations began from New Ashok Nagar to Meerut South in Meerut.

== Facilities ==
The station has all advanced facilities and amenities equipped with groundbreaking technology as prevalent in the existing and the upcoming stations of the Delhi–Meerut Regional Rapid Transit System. It is unique as compared to other stations, as it has an extended concourse beneath its platform level and the viaduct running above towards the western side of the station, in order to provide direct connectivity with the nearby Delhi Metro's New Ashok Nagar metro station. It has all facilities to facilitate passengers like three entry/exit points, parking space to the north-western side of the station with electric vehicle charging points, lifts, escalators, stairs retail stores and stalls covering the concourse for enhanced experience, washrooms, drinking water areas, ticket and token vending machines, enquiry desks, a station control area, additional facilities like wheelchairs for physically-challenged passengers and emergency equipments like firefighting and medical assistance services.

== Features ==
The station has state-of-the-art features to use renewable energy to run itself, similar to the other RRTS stations equivalent to an airport, like adequate use of natural light to reduce dependence on artificial lights, and running all lightings with LED. Others include electric vehicle charging points at the parking space, platform screen doors (PSDs) on platforms for enhanced passenger safety, CCTV surveillance and the usage of renewable energy as a source of power. It will use solar energy and rainwater harvesting facilities to facilitate its operations entirely. For solar power, it will have 900 solar panels on the roof that will generate over 650,000 units of electricity annually, and the rainwater harvesting system has five pits for storage of water. These pits help to absorb rainwater collected from the station and the viaduct into the ground, thus contributing to groundwater conservation and replenishment. In these ways, the entire station will be a green and eco-friendly building.

== Station layout ==
The station has two elevated side platforms with two rail tracks in between for regular services, and the concourse located underneath the platform level. The station has a total length of 332 metres, owing to the extended concourse level westwards to provide enhanced connectivity with the Delhi Metro's New Ashok Nagar metro station, while only the station is 215 metres long, and a breadth of 24 meters. The rail tracks have been laid at a height of 25 meters above the ground level.

G	Street level	Exit/Entrance
L1	Mezzanine/Concourse	Fare control, Station agent, Facilities, Retail stores, Token and ticket vending machines, Crossover
L2	Side platform | Doors will open on the left
L2	Platform 1 Eastbound	Towards → Modipuram; Next Station: Anand Vihar
L2	Platform 2 Westbound	Towards ← Sarai Kale Khan
L2	Side platform | Doors will open on the left
L2

== See also ==
- National Capital Region Transport Corporation
- Delhi–Meerut Regional Rapid Transit System
- RapidX
- Namo Bharat
- Sarai Kale Khan RRTS station
- Anand Vihar RRTS station
- Meerut Metro
