= Ghaziabad RRTS station =

RapidX's Delhi–Meerut RRTS station

Ghaziabad
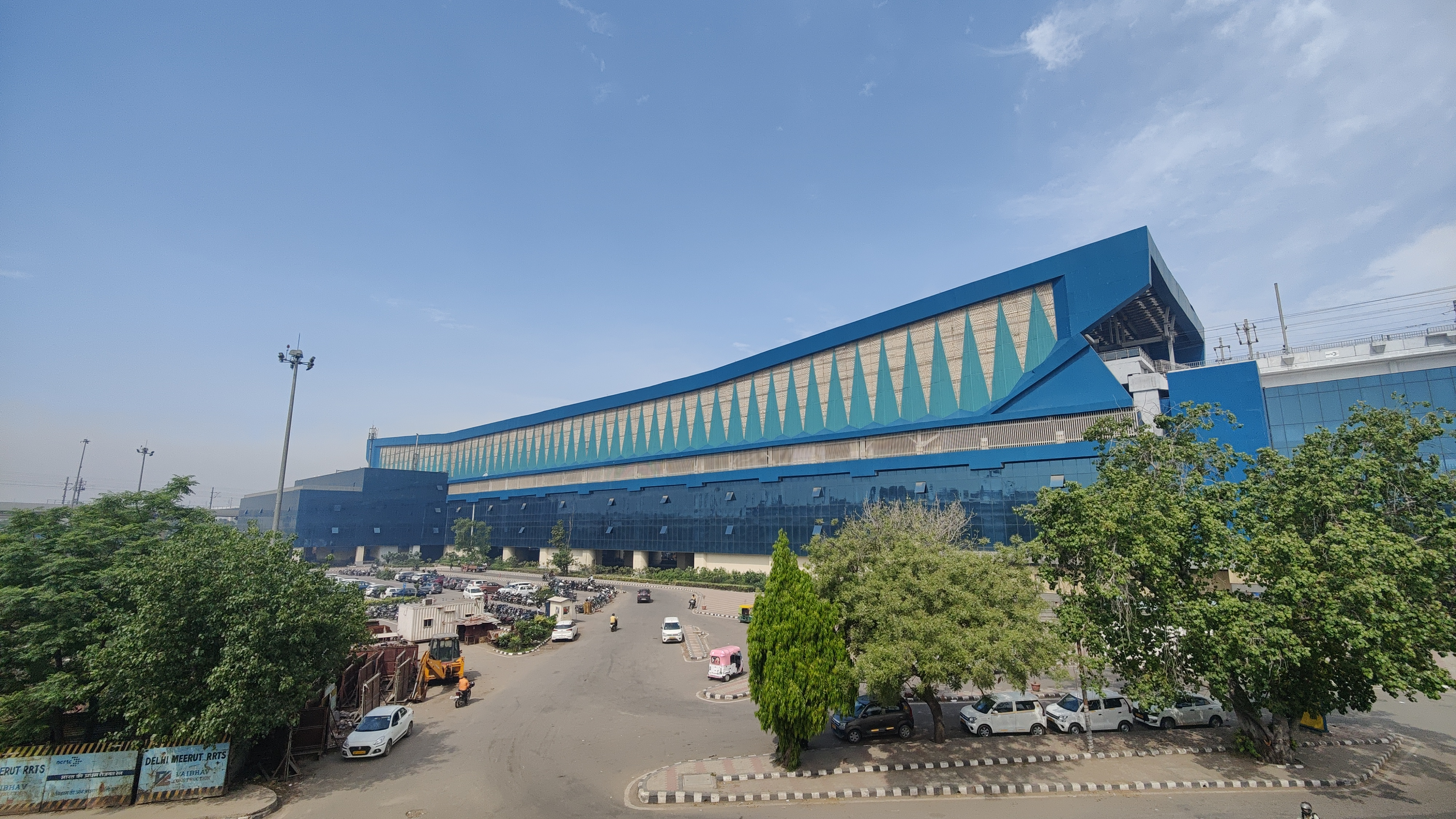
- Ghaziabad Station of RapidX, Ghaziabad, Uttar Pradesh

General information
- Location: Sector 7, Patel Nagar 2nd, Patel Nagar, Ghaziabad, Uttar Pradesh 201003; India
- Coordinates: 28.6723652°N 77.4113199°E
- System: Namo Bharat RRTS station
- Owner: NCRTC
- Operator: NCRTC
- Line: Delhi–Meerut RRTS
- Platforms: Side platform Platform-1 → Duhai Depot / Modipuram; Platform-2 → Sarai Kale Khan Island platform Platform-2 → Sarai Kale Khan; Platform-3 → Train Terminates Here
- Tracks: 3
- Connections: Red Line Shaheed Sthal

Construction
- Structure type: Elevated, Double track
- Platform levels: 4
- Parking: Four-Wheeler Parking
- Accessible: Yes

Other information
- Status: Operational

History
- Opened: 21 October 2023; 2 years ago
- Electrified: 25 kV 50 Hz AC through overhead catenary

Services
| Preceding station | Namo Bharat | Following station |
|---|---|---|
| Sahibabad towards Sarai Kale Khan | Delhi–Meerut | Guldhar towards Modipuram |
Route map
Location

Ghaziabad RRTS station is an elevated RRTS station in the Ghaziabad district of Uttar Pradesh, India which serves for higher-speed trains on the Delhi–Meerut Regional Rapid Transit System (Delhi–Meerut RRTS) that can reach speeds of up to 180 km/h. The station is powered by solar energy, with 1,100 solar panels on the station's roof.

Ghaziabad RRTS station was commissioned on 20 October 2023 by Prime Minister Narendra Modi along with the 17 km long Sahibad-Duhaiyya section of Delhi–Meerut RRTS and was open to general public on 21 October 2023.

== History ==
The National Capital Region Transport Corporation (NCRTC) had invited tenders for the construction of the Ghaziabad RRTS station along with the 7.3 km long Sahibabad ramp–Ghaziabad section of the 82.15 km Delhi–Meerut RRTS line. KEC International and China Civil Engineering Construction Corporation emerged as the lowest bidder for construction work. As a result, KEC International and China Civil Engineering Construction Corp has been awarded a Rs 579.76 crore contract responsible for Package 1 (Sahibabad ramp–Ghaziabad) in August 2019. Under the agreement, companies started construction of Ghaziabad RRTS station.

== Station layout ==
The Ghaziabad RRTS station has 3 elevated station platforms, with the operational station building being located underneath of platform level. The RRTS station has 2 side platforms and one island platform, which serves 4 rail tracks for regular service.

It has 4 levels - platform, mezzanine, concourse and street level. Ghaziabad RRTS station will be 215 meters long and 42 meters wide. The RRTS Station is the tallest station in Delhi-NCR, with the height of 26 meters from the ground level.

| G | Street Level | Exit/ Entrance |
| L1 | Mezzanine | Fare control, station agent, Metro Card vending machines, crossover |
| L2 | Side platform | Doors will open on the left |
| L2 | Platform 1 Eastbound | Towards → Duhai Depot / Modipuram; Next Station: DPS Rajnagar Guldhar |
| L2 | Platform 2 Westbound | Towards ← Sarai Kale Khan; Next Station: Sahibabad |
| L2 | Island platform | P2 and P3 Doors will open on the left |
| L2 | Platform 3 Westbound | Towards → Modipuram; Next Station: DPS Rajnagar Guldhar |
| L2 |

There are 5 Gate points – 1, 2, 3, 4 and 5. Commuters can use either of the points for their travel:-

- Gate 1 (Closed) - Towards Traffic Police Training Center, Meerut Side (Delhi End)
- Gate 2 (Closed) - Towards Meerut Side (Meerut End)
- Gate 3 (Closed) - Towards DMRC Shaheed Sthal metro station or Mod Gol Chakkar (Meerut End)
- Gate 4 (Opened) - Towards Mahamaya Stadium (Delhi End)
- Gate 5 (Opened) - Towards Meerut End
