= Mudrika Seva =

Bus route in Delhi, India

The Mudrika Seva (Ring road bus service) is one of the most popular bus routes in Delhi, India. It was started by the Delhi Transport Corporation (DTC) in May 1974, and is now operated by both the Corporation and DIMTS' cluster buses. The service runs on Delhi's inner ring road, with major stops at AIIMS, Lajpat Nagar, Sarai Kale Khan, ITO, Delhi Gate, Kashmere Gate, DU North Campus, Model Town, Azadpur market, Shalimar Bagh, Punjabi Bagh, Britannia Factory, Rajouri Garden, Naraina, and DU South Campus.

The service's origins can be traced to a government report drafted in 1973. The report, titled "A Systems Approach to the DTC Bus Problem", recommended a radical reorganization of DTC routes, and called for a focus on direction instead of destination. This led to the creation of the Mudrika Seva on the ring road, with buses running on the 55 km (34 mi) road in both directions at 10-minute intervals.

One variant of this service, the Teevra Mudrika Seva (TMS), originating and ending at DTC's Wazirpur depot, plies via Sarai Kale Khan, instead of passing through Nizamuddin Dargah and Pragati Maidan, to join the Ring Road at Indraprastha depot. This service is the second longest bus route operated by DTC and is a lifeline for many commuters because of its high frequency.

A second variant, the Outer Mudrika Service (OMS), is the longest route operated by DTC with a length of 105 km (65 mi). It was started in 2002, the same year Delhi Metro began its operations. The service originates from Uttam Nagar Terminal in West Delhi, takes 6 hours to complete its journey, and covers distant parts of Delhi. It has its major stops at Uttam Nagar, Peeragarhi, Pitampura, Mukarba Chowk, Burari, Wazirabad, Bhajanpura, Yamuna Vihar, Dilshad Garden, Anand Vihar ISBT, Laxmi Nagar, Akshardham, NH-24, Sarai Kale Khan, Ashram, Kalkaji, Okhla, Sangam Vihar, Ambedkar Nagar, Saket, Munirka, R.K. Puram, Dhaula Kuan, and Janakpuri.

A third variant, the Yamuna Mudrika Service (YMS) is another circular bus route operated by DTC in the parts of Delhi east of the Yamuna river, comprising the districts of East Delhi, North-East Delhi, and Shahdara. The route originates and terminates at Mori Gate Terminal, and its major stops include Mori Gate, Shastri Park, Geeta Colony, Ganesh Nagar, Mayur Vihar, Trilokpuri, Kalyanpuri, Anand Vihar ISBT, Seemapuri, Nand Nagri, Yamuna Vihar, and Bhajanpura.

A fourth variant, the West Delhi Mudrika (WDM), has a length of 45 km (28 mi) and takes 2.5 hours to complete its journey. Its starts and ends at Madhu Vihar, with major stops at Janakpuri, Mayapuri, Naraina, Shadipur, Kirti Nagar, Rajouri Garden, Tilak Nagar and Uttam Nagar.
