= Anand Vihar RRTS station =

RapidX's Delhi–Meerut RRTS station

Anand Vihar
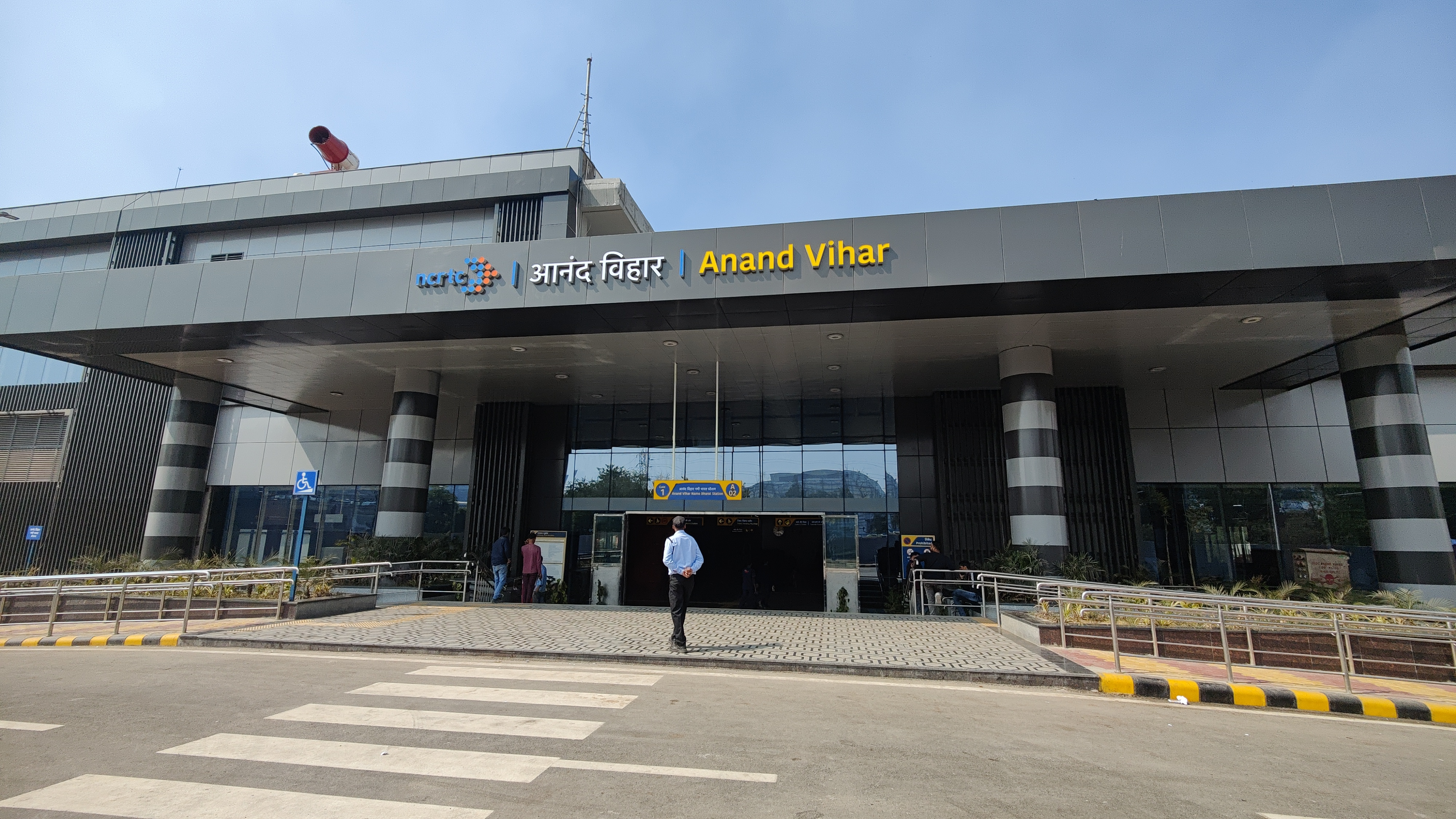
- Anand Vihar RRTS station

General information
- Location: Anand Vihar, East Delhi, Delhi; India
- Coordinates: 28.6477198°N 77.3177137°E
- System: Namo Bharat RRTS station
- Owner: NCRTC
- Operator: RapidX
- Line: Delhi–Meerut
- Platforms: Island platform Platform-1 → Modipuram; Platform-2 → Sarai Kale Khan
- Tracks: 2
- Connections: Anand Vihar; Blue Line Pink Line; Anand Vihar Terminal; Anand Vihar ISBT

Construction
- Structure type: Underground, Double track
- Parking: TBC

Other information
- Status: Operational

History
- Opened: 5 January 2025; 19 months ago
- Electrified: 25 kV 50 Hz AC through overhead catenary

Services
Preceding station	Namo Bharat	Following station
New Ashok Nagar towards Sarai Kale Khan	Delhi–Meerut	Sahibabad towards Modipuram
Route map
Location
- Interactive map

The Anand Vihar RRTS station is an underground high-speed rail station located in East Delhi, India. It is the only underground station on the Delhi–Meerut Regional Rapid Transit System of the RapidX regional high-speed rail network. Trains at this station currently operates at speeds of up to 180 km/h, offering rapid transit along the corridor.

== History ==
The National Capital Region Transport Corporation invited tenders on November 11, 2019, for the construction of the Anand Vihar RRTS station along with the 5.6 km stretch from the ramp at New Ashok Nagar to the one located at Sahibabad along the 82.15 km Delhi–Meerut Regional Rapid Transit System line. The Shanghai Tunnel Engineering Co. Limited (STEC) emerged as the lowest bidder for the construction work and was subsequently awarded a ₹1,126.89 crore contract on December 9, 2020, for Package 4, which covers the section from the New Ashok Nagar ramp to the Sahibabad ramp. Under the agreement, the company embarked on the construction of the Anand Vihar RRTS station.

== Station layout ==
The Anand Vihar RRTS station will feature two underground island platforms, serving the Delhi–Meerut line. The station is located at a depth of 8 meters below ground level.
