= Delhi–Alwar Regional Rapid Transit System =

Semi high-speed rail corridor in India

Overview
- Owner: NCRTC
- Area served: National Capital Region
- Locale: NCR
- Transit type: Semi-high speed rail; Regional rail
- Number of stations: 22

Operation
- Operation will start: November 2031
- Operator: NCRTC

Technical
- System length: 164 km (102 mi)
- No. of tracks: 2
- Track gauge: (1,676 mm (5 ft 6 in) broad gauge)
- Electrification: 25 kV, 50 Hz AC overhead catenary
- Average speed: 100 km/h (60 mph)
- Top speed: 160 km/h (100 mph)

The Delhi–Alwar Regional Rapid Transit System (Delhi–Alwar RRTS) is a 164 km (102 mi) planned semi-high speed rail corridor that will connect Delhi, Gurugram, Rewari, SNB and Alwar. It is one of the three Namo Bharat corridors planned under Phase 1 of the Rapid Rail Transport System of the National Capital Region Transport Corporation (NCRTC). With a maximum speed of 160 km/h (100 mph) and average speed of 105 km/h (65 mph), the distance between Delhi and Alwar is projected to be covered in 104 minutes.

The corridor has been planned for dual use, accommodating both Regional Rapid Transit System (RRTS) services for longer-distance travel with fewer stops and metro services for shorter suburban travel with more frequent stops. The project's cost estimated in 2017 was ₹37,000 crore (equivalent to ₹570 billion or US$6.051 billion in 2026).

== History ==
As part of the Integrated Transportation Plan 2032, the National Capital Region Planning Board (NCRPB) identified eight rail-based rapid transit corridors to improve the efficacy of transportation system in the NCR. These were:

1. Delhi - Gurgaon - Rewari - Alwar
2. Delhi - Ghaziabad - Meerut
3. Delhi - Sonipat - Panipat
4. Delhi - Faridabad - Ballabhgarh - Palwal
5. Delhi - Bahadurgarh - Rohtak
6. Delhi - Shahadra - Baraut
7. Ghaziabad - Khurja
8. Ghaziabad - Hapur

Of the aforesaid corridors, Delhi-Alwar, Delhi-Panipat and Delhi-Meerut are to be constructed in the first phase. The Urban Mass Transit Company was commissioned to conduct a feasibility study on 23 March 2010. The study thus submitted was approved by the Planning Board in 2012. The contract was then transferred to NCRTC on 18 January 2017 to carry the study forward.

On 15 June 2018, the first phase of the project, a 100 km (62 mi) long segment from Hazrat Nizamuddin to Shahjahanpur-Neemrana-Behror, slated to cost an estimated ₹25,000 crore (equivalent to ₹36,000 in 2026; or US$3.78 billion), was approved by the Haryana government.

== Construction ==
Construction of the Delhi-Alwar RRTS is likely to commence from August 2026, lasting until November 2031.

== Stations ==
There will be total 22 stations in total; 16 (11 elevated and five underground) will be built in the first phase and the rest in later phases.

| No. | Station Name | Connections | Station Layout | Status |
Phase-1
| 1 | Sarai Kale Khan | Pink Line; Hazrat Nizamuddin; Sarai Kale Khan ISBT | Elevated | Completed |
| 2 | INA | Yellow Line; Pink Line | Underground | Planned |
| 3 | Munirka | Magenta Line | Underground | Planned |
| 4 | Delhi Aerocity | Airport Express; Golden Line | Underground | Planned |
| 5 | Cyber City | None | Elevated | Planned |
| 6 | Gurugram Sector-17 | None | Elevated | Planned |
| 7 | Gurugram Rajiv Chowk | None | Elevated | Planned |
| 8 | Kherki Daula | None | Underground | Planned |
| 9 | IMT Manesar | None | Underground | Planned |
| 10 | Panchgaon | None | Elevated | Planned |
| 11 | Bilaspur Chowk | None | Elevated | Planned |
| 12 | Dharuhera | None | Elevated | Planned |
| 13 | MBIR | None | Elevated | Planned |
| 14 | Rewari District | None | Elevated | Planned |
| 15 | Bawal | None | Elevated | Planned |
Phase-2
| 16 | Kotputli-Behror Border | None | Elevated | Planned |
| 17 | Shahjahanpur | None | Elevated | Planned |
| 18 | Neemrana | None | Elevated | Planned |
| 19 | Behror | None | Elevated | Planned |
| 20 | Sotanala | None | Elevated | Planned |
Phase-3
| 21 | Khairthal | None | Elevated | Planned |
| 22 | Alwar | None | Elevated | Planned |

== Status updates ==
- June 2018: The Detailed Project Report (DPR) of the project is approved by the Government of Haryana.
- December 2018: The Phase-I construction project proposal for Delhi-Gurgaon-Shahjahanpur-Neemrana-Behror stretch is approved by NCRTC.
- February 2019: The Government of Haryana approved the project.
- June 2019: The Government of Rajasthan approved the project.
- November 2019 Nov: Bids for the construction of the Gurgaon section of the project were invited.
- May 2022: Pre-construction work begins on the project's corridor in Gurgaon.
- March 2023: Pre-construction work complete in Gurgaon.
- October 2024: The Ministry of Housing and Urban Affairs announced that the commissioning of the networks linking Delhi-Panipat and Delhi to Shahjahanpur-Neemrana-Behror and Alwar is expected to commence in 2025.
- November 2024: It was decided that the entire rapid rail route will be developed all at once in one phase.
- May 2025: Construction likely to start in August 2026.

== See also ==
- Urban rail transit in India
- Delhi-Sonipat-Panipat RRTS
- Delhi–Meerut Regional RRTS
- Ghaziabad–Jewar RRTS
- Railway in Haryana
- Highways in Haryana
