= New Ashok Nagar metro station =

Metro station in Delhi, India

New Ashok Nagar

- New Ashok Nagar station

General information
- Location: A-706, Block B, New Ashok Nagar, New Delhi, Delhi, 110096
- Coordinates: 28°35′21″N 77°18′07″E
- System: Delhi Metro station
- Owner: Delhi Metro Rail Corporation Ltd. (DMRC)
- Line: Blue Line
- Platforms: Side platform; Platform-1 → Noida Electronic City; Platform-2 → Dwarka Sector 21
- Tracks: 2
- Connections: New Ashok Nagar

Construction
- Structure type: Elevated
- Platform levels: 2
- Accessible: Yes

Other information
- Station code: NAGR

History
- Opened: 12 November 2009; 17 years ago
- Electrified: 25 kV 50 Hz AC through overhead catenary

Passengers
- 2015: Average 12,188 /day 377,841 (Month of Jan)

Services
Preceding station	Delhi Metro	Following station
Mayur Vihar Extension towards Dwarka Sector 21	Blue Line	Noida Sector 15 towards Noida Electronic City
Route map
Location

New Ashok Nagar is an elevated metro station on the Blue Line of the Delhi Metro, located in East Delhi. It serves the residential locality of New Ashok Nagar and surrounding areas.

The station is connected to the New Ashok Nagar station of the Delhi–Meerut Namo Bharat Regional Rapid Transit System (RRTS) through a 90 metres (300 ft) long foot overbridge (FOB), facilitating interchange between the two transport networks. The Namo Bharat station commenced passenger operations on 5 January 2025, while the connecting footbridge was opened to commuters in November 2025.

== Station layout ==
L2	Side platform | Doors will open on the left
L2	Platform 1 North bound	Towards → Noida Electronic City; Next Station: Noida Sector 15 (Delhi-UP Border)
L2	Platform 2 South bound	Towards ← Dwarka Sector 21; Next Station: Mayur Vihar Extension
L2	Side platform | Doors will open on the left
L1	Concourse	Fare control, station agent, Metro Card vending machines, crossover
G	Street Level	Exit/Entrance

== Facilities ==
The station has commercial outlets on its ground floor, including a Domino's outlet. A Punjab National Bank ATM is available near Gate 1. The station also provides parking facilities for cars and two-wheelers.

== Connections ==
Auto-rickshaws and e-rickshaws are available outside the station, providing last-mile connectivity to nearby areas and destinations, including Vasundhara Enclave, Dharamshila Cancer Hospital, New Ashok Nagar Police Chowki, Plaza Market and DDA Market. E-rickshaws also provide connectivity to Noida, including Sectors 15, 16, 18 (Atta Market) and 37.

== See also ==
- List of Delhi Metro stations
- Transport in Delhi
- Delhi Metro Rail Corporation
- Delhi Suburban Railway
- List of rapid transit systems in India
