= Sahibabad RRTS station =

RapidX's Delhi–Meerut RRTS station

Sahibabad

General information
- Location: Madan Mohan Malviya Marg, PIR Colony, Sahibabad Industrial Area Site 4, Vasundhara, Ghaziabad, Uttar Pradesh 201010; India
- Coordinates: 28.6675396°N 77.365493°E
- System: Namo Bharat RRTS station
- Owner: NCRTC
- Operator: NCRTC
- Line: Delhi–Meerut RRTS
- Platforms: Side platform Platform-1 → Modipuram; Platform-2 → Sarai Kale Khan
- Tracks: 2
- Connections: Sahibabad Bus Terminal

Construction
- Structure type: Elevated, Double track
- Platform levels: 2
- Parking: Four-Wheeler Parking
- Accessible: Yes

Other information
- Status: Operational

History
- Opened: 21 October 2023; 2 years ago
- Electrified: 25 kV 50 Hz AC through overhead catenary

Services
Preceding station	Namo Bharat	Following station
Anand Vihar towards Sarai Kale Khan	Delhi–Meerut	Ghaziabad towards Modipuram
Route map
Location

Sahibabad RRTS station is an elevated temporary terminal RRTS station in the Ghaziabad district of Uttar Pradesh, India which serves semi high speed trains on the Delhi–Meerut Regional Rapid Transit System that can reach speeds of up to 180 km/h. The station is powered by solar energy, with 1,100 solar panels on the station's roof.

Sahibabad RRTS station was commissioned on 20 October 2023 by Prime Minister Narendra Modi along with the 17 km long Sahibad-Duhaiyya section of Delhi–Meerut RRTS and was opened to general public on 21 October 2023.

== History ==
The National Capital Region Transport Corporation (NCRTC) had invited tenders for the construction of the Sahibabad RRTS station along with the 7.3 km long Sahibabad ramp–Ghaziabad section of the 82.15 km Delhi-Meerut RRTS line. KEC International and China Civil Engineering Construction Corporation emerged as the lowest bidder for construction work. As a result, KEC International and China Civil Engineering Construction Corporation has been awarded a Rs 579.76 crore contract responsible for Package 1 (Sahibabad ramp–Ghaziabad) in August 2019. Under the agreement, companies started construction of Sahibabad RRTS station.

== Station layout ==
The Sahibabad RRTS station has 2 elevated station platforms, with the operational station building being located underneath of platform level. The RRTS station has 2 side platforms, which serves 2 rail tracks for regular service.

It currently has three levels - platform, concourse and street level. Sahibabad RRTS station is having length of 215 meters long and breadth of 26 meters wide. The rail tracks are constructed at a height of 24 meters above the ground level.

G	Street level	Exit/Entrance
L1	Mezzanine	Fare control, Station agent, Token vending machines, Crossover
L2	Side platform | Doors will open on the left
L2	Platform 1 Eastbound	Towards → Modipuram; Next Station: Ghaziabad
L2	Platform 2 Westbound	Towards ← Sarai Kale Khan; Next Station: Anand Vihar
L2	Side platform | Doors will open on the left
L2

=== Gate Points:- ===
There are 3 gate points – 1, 2 and 3. Commuters can use either of the points for their travel:-

- Gate 1 - Towards Mohan Nagar (Delhi Side), Sahibabad Bus Depot Petrol station
- Gate 2 - Towards Mohan Nagar (Meerut Side)
- Gate 3 - Towards Shri Digambar Jain Mandir (Delhi Side), Madan Mohan Malviya Marg, Loh Purush Drada Sardar Patel Udyan
