= Haryana Orbital Rail Corridor =

Under-construction high-speed railway project in India

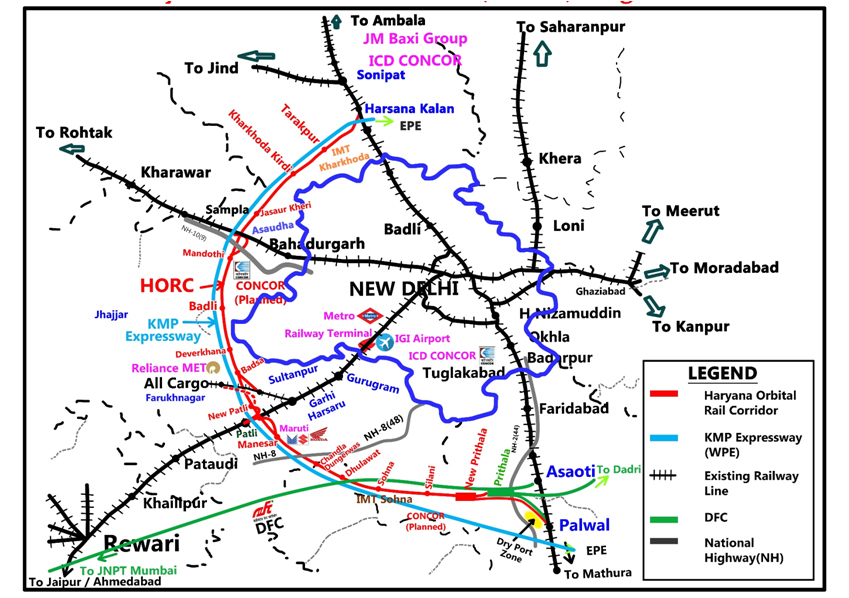
- Haryana Orbital Rail Corridor route map

Overview
- Status: Under construction
- Owner: Indian Railways and Government of Haryana
- Locale: Haryana
- Termini: Palwal; Sonipat

Service
- Type: Passenger rail, freight rail
- Operator: Haryana Rail Infrastructure Development Corporation
- Ridership: 20,000 (projected)

Technical
- Line length: 121.7 km (75.6 mi)
- Track gauge: 5 ft 6 in (1,676 mm) broad gauge
- Operating speed: 160 kmph

Haryana Orbital Rail Corridor (HORC) is an under construction broad-gauge twin-track 121.7-kilometre (75.6 mi) long and 160 km per hour higher-speed railway project in Haryana state of India, which will run around along the Western Peripheral Expressway (WPE) on the western side of Delhi. It is expected to be complete by 2028.

It connects Palwal to Sonipat via Sohna, Manesar and Kharkhoda. At Palwal, Patli (Delhi–Rewari line), Sultanpur (Garhi Harsaru–Farukhnagar line), Asaudha (Delhi–Rohtak line) and Harsana Kalan (Delhi-Ambala line) railway stations. It will connect to existing railway lines running radially from Delhi. It will also connect to the Western Dedicated Freight Corridor (WDFC) at Prithala near Palwal railway station. It will transport 20,000 passengers a day and 50 MTPA cargo.

== Details ==
=== Length ===
Mainline corridor has the total "route length" of 121.7 km, but the additional connectivity and loop lines of 9.9 km will result in the total "line length" of at least 131.6 km.

=== Funding ===
The Haryana Rail Infrastructure Development Corporation (HRIDC), a joint venture founded by the Ministry of Railways and Government of Haryana - Haryana State Industrial and Infrastructure Development Corporation (HSIIDC), will construct the corridor by 2025. The Cabinet Committee on Economic Affairs of Government of India approved ₹5,617 crore (US$580 million) for the project in September 2020.

=== Civil works ===
It will have 23 over-water bridges (25 main bridges over canals and 195 small bridges over culverts), three road flyovers, two road over-bridges, and 153 road under-bridges.

=== Aravali tunnel ===
Haryana Orbital Railway Aravali Tunnel (HORA Tunnel), Rs1088 cr, 4.69 km long, 25 m high, double-lane railway tunnel (allowing for passage of two trains simultaneously), parallel to the Western Peripheral Expressway through the Aravali mountain range, is the only tunnel on this route. Tenders were invited in July 2022 and finalised in December 2022. Construction was awarded by HRIDC to RVNL. It is scheduled to be completed by 2026. Tunnel height is such that it will allow the operation of double-decker trains.

== Extension ==
=== EORC - Eastern Orbital Rail Corridor in Uttar Pradesh ===
Eastern Orbital Rail Corridor (EORC) 90 km - DPR done in Feb 2025: As part of the NCR Planning Board's 2041 regional plan, is a 90km railway extension of HORC corridor along the Eastern Peripheral Expressway (EPE) within Uttar Pradesh with the aim to also connect Ghaziabad, Baghpat, Noida, and Greater Noida, and Dadri to facilitate passenger and goods transport across the Delhi National Capital Region (NCR) and integrate with other transportation modes. The Government of Uttar Pradesh paid Haryana Rail Infrastructure Development Corporation (HRIDC) Rs. 1.5. crore in August 2024 for carrying out the 6-month long feasibility study, which was completed in Feb 2025. Running along the EPE and WPE, it will have 9 stations in UP and 5 stations in Haryana, from north to south, Sonipat district in Haryana (Malha Mazara, Jatheri on NH-44, and Bhaira Bakipur), Ghaziabad district in UP (Khekhra - near junction of NH-709B and EPE, Badagaon, Manauli, Dasna, Sukhanapur), Gautam Buddha Nagar district in UP (Rajatpur, Shamshudinpur, Bisaich, and Gunapura), and Faridabad district in Haryana (Chhainsa, Jawan, and Fatehpur Biloch).

=== Palwal-Noida International Airport-Khurja rail line ===
- Palwal-Noida International Airport-Khurja rail line (under-construction) - DPR underway in April 2025: It will connect HORC to Noida Airport and to Khurja.

=== Garhi Harsaru–Farukhnagar–Jhajjar rail line ===
Garhi Harsaru–Farukhnagar–Jhajjar rail line (36 km) - DPR underway in April 2025: Will connect HORC to Gurugram-Delhi and Jhajjar. DPR (Detailed Project Reports) for the Garhi Harsaru–Farukhnagar–Jhajjar (36 km) and Karnal–Yamunanagar (65 km) rail lines, which will be interconnected to HORC, were under preparation in April 2025.

=== Delhi–Alwar rail line ===
Delhi–Alwar rail line (104 km) - construction commenced with budget allocation in FY2025-26 rail budget: Running via Sohna-Nuh-Ferozepur Jhirka, it will have 17 new stations. Will connect to HORC near Sohna.

== Additional connectivity ==
Haryana Orbital Rail Corridor will enhance connectivity with and among the following.

=== Expressways ===
The rail corridor will run within Haryana along the Western Peripheral Expressway (WPE), connecting various hubs along the way. WPE is connected to the Eastern Peripheral Expressway (EPE) which runs in Uttar Pradesh, It will also pass across the Delhi–Mumbai Expressway between Sohna and Palwal, and Delhi–Amritsar–Katra Expressway near Kharkhoda.

=== DMIC and WDFC ===
This orbital railway will be a key enabler of Delhi–Mumbai Industrial Corridor Project as it will also connect to the Delhi-Mumbai Western Dedicated Freight Corridor (WDFC) near Palwal railway station. Delhi–Mumbai Expressway is also part of this corridor which will intersect the orbital railway.

=== Rail lines among IGI Delhi, Hisar and Noida airports ===
From Hisar International Airport to IGI Delhi, a semi-high-speed train will be introduced, which may require the upgrade or replacement of existing line, or the laying of additional new line between Hansi to Asaudha (near Bahadurgarh on the Haryana Orbital Rail Corridor). This will also connect to the Delhi–Alwar Regional Rapid Transit System near Gurugram via Haryana Orbital Rail corridor.

This will also enable connectivity between Hisar Airport and Noida International Airport (Jewar Airport), and Jewar Airport to IGI Delhi.

=== RRTS and high-speed rail ===
This corridor will also intersect with Delhi–Ahmedabad high-speed rail corridor near Manesar, and various RRTS such as Delhi–Alwar RRTS, Delhi–Karnal RRTS, Delhi-Rohtak-Hisar RRTS and Delhi-Palwal-Hodal RRTS.

=== Metro ===
This corridor will also intersect with the following proposed and/or under-construction spurs of Delhi Metro:

- Narela-Sonipat metro on the Red Line
- Bahadurgarh-Rohtak metro near Asaudha on the Green Line
- Gurugram-Manesar metro at Manesar on the Yellow Line
- Najafgarh-Jhajjar metro near Badli on the Grey Line
- Badli-Badsa metro near AIIMS Badsa on the Grey Line
- Faridabad-Palwal metro near Asaoti on the Violet Line

== Construction updates ==
=== Planned construction schedule ===
- FY2025-2026 Basic Infrastructure Construction - under construction: construction of bridges, tunnels and stations; laying of tracks; connecting industrial areas with track e.g. Maruti sliding and Reliance sliding.
- FY2027-2028 Electrification and Trail Run - planned: Track electrification, safety tests, trail run, and commence regular scheduled operation.
- FY2027-2028 Official Completion Date for entire 121.6 km route - 31 March 2028 (likely to be delayed due to delay in contract award of packages C6A and C6B which mandate 2.5 yr or 910 days construction period after contract award).

=== Current status ===
- Overall:
  - Land acquisition:
    - 2024: 665.92 ha land of 67 villages has been acquired.
    - 2026 Jan: A joint panel was formed to resolve land transfer issues between HSIIDC and HRIDC for the entire route of HORC.
- Gurugram (Patli) - Palwal (New Prithla) section, 91 km:
  - Package-C1 Manesar – New Patli, 5.9 km, operational since 2025: Completed in 2025, with additional ~ 8 km long private rail link to the Maruti Car factory (not part of the HORC scope) was also operationalised.
  - Package-C23 New Patli - Dhulawat, 25.9 km, target completion June 2026: Under-construction by PNC Infratech.
  - Package-C4 Dhulawat–Sohna Tunnel, 4.7 km, target completion June 2026: Under-construction by RVNL.
  - Package-C5 Dhulawat-Sohna Tunnel to New Prithla (Palwal), 21.1 km, target completion date is June 2026: Under-construction by Dilip Buildcon.
- Gurugram (Patli)-Sonipat (Harsana Kalan), 74.3 km: June 2024 was scrapped and revised work was split into the following two sections.
  - Package-C6A New Patli – New Asaudha, 41.3 km, realistic target completion December 2028:
    - 2026 Jan: Revised tender issued in January 2026 with bid closing date of March 2026 and bid award likely in June 2024, after which 910 days (2.5 year) construction period will result in target completion by December 2028.
  - Package-C6B New Asaudha – Sonipat (Harsana Kalan), 32.0 km, unconfirmed likely-target completion mid-to-late 2029: The pending tender is expected to be floated around mid-2026 (unconfirmed tentative-only dates) and awarded by late-2026 with 910 days (2.5 year) construction period resulting in the likely target completion by mid-to-late 2029.

== See also ==
- Administrative divisions of Haryana
- Highways in Haryana
- Railway in Haryana
- Future of rail transport in India
- High-speed rail in India
- National Capital Region Transport Corporation
