= Delhi–Panipat Regional Rapid Transit System =

Indian rail system

Overview
- Owner: NCRTC
- Area served: Delhi; Sonipat; Panipat; Karnal
- Locale: NCR
- Transit type: Semi-high speed rail; Regional rail
- Number of lines: 1 line
- Number of stations: 22

Operation
- Headway: 5–10 minutes

Technical
- System length: 136.30 km
- No. of tracks: 2
- Track gauge: (1,435 mm (4 ft 8 1/2 in) standard gauge)
- Electrification: 25 kV, 50 Hz AC overhead catenary

The Delhi–Karnal Regional Rapid Transit System (Delhi–Karnal Namo Bharat) is an approved, 136.30 km (84.69 mi) long, semi-high speed rail corridor connecting Delhi, Sonipat, Panipat and Karnal in the National Capital Region. It is one of the three RapidX corridors planned under Phase-1 of the Rapid Rail Transport System of the National Capital Region Transport Corporation (NCRTC). The project is expected to cost ₹34,740 crore (US$3.7 billion).

== Route and stations ==
The line will start from Sarai Kale Khan station, which will allow interchange with Delhi-Alwar RapidX and Delhi-Meerut RapidX lines, as well as connectivity to the Nizamuddin railway station, Sarai Kale Khan ISBT and Sarai Kale Khan - Nizamuddin metro station. There will be total 22 stations on the corridor out of which two will be underground and the rest will be elevated.

No.	Station name		Connections	Layout	Status
No.	English	Hindi	Connections	Layout	Status
1	Sarai Kale Khan	सराय काले ख़ान	Pink Line; Hazrat Nizamuddin; Sarai Kale Khan ISBT	Elevated	Construction works underway
2	Indraprastha	इंद्रप्रस्थ	Blue Line	Elevated	Planned
3	Kashmere Gate	कश्मीरी गेट	Red Line; Yellow Line; Violet Line; Kashmere Gate ISBT	Underground	Planned
4	Jharoda Majra	झड़ौदा माजरा	Pink Line	Elevated	Planned
5	Bhalaswa	भलस्वा	Magenta Line	Elevated	Planned
6	Alipur	अलीपुर	None	Elevated	Planned
7	Narela	नरेला	Red Line	Elevated	Planned
8	Kundli	कुंडली	Red Line	Elevated	Planned
9	KMP	केएमपी	None	Elevated	Planned
10	Bahalgarh Chowk	बहालगढ़ चौक	None	Elevated	Planned
11	Murthal	मुरथल	None	Elevated	Planned
12	Bahri	बरी	None	Elevated	Planned
13	Gannaur	गनौर	None	Elevated	Planned
14	Samalkha	समालखा	None	Elevated	Planned
15	Panipat ISBT	पानीपत आईएसबीटी	None	Elevated	Planned
16	Panipat City	पानीपत सिटी	None	Underground	Planned
17	Panipat Sector 18	पानीपत सेक्टर 18	None	Elevated	Planned
18	Ganjbar-Badauli-Kohand	गंजबर-बदौली-कोहंड	None	Elevated	Planned
19	Gharunda	घरौंदा	None	Elevated	Planned
20	Karnal Bypass	करनाल बाईपास	None	Elevated	Planned
21	Karnal Sector 7	करनाल सेक्टर 7	None	Elevated	Planned
22	Karnal ISBT	करनाल ISBT	None	Elevated	Planned

== Inter-connectivity ==
It will connect with the following multi-model transports:

- Haryana Orbital Rail Corridor near Kundli
- National Highway 44 (India) (NH44), track will mostly run along NH44
- Western Peripheral Expressway interchange near Sonipat

== Status ==
- 19 July 2017 - NHAI granted in-principle approval.
- 13 March 2020 - DPR approved by NCRTC Board.
- 18 January 2021 - Delhi Panipat RRTS corridor approved by Government of Haryana.
- 12 March 2021 - Process to identify Station land for extension to Karnal begins (3 more stations).
- 18 August 2021 - DPR pending with Central Government since Dec 2020.
- 14 Dec 2021 - Centre has not received the Delhi government's approval for its financial commitment with regard to DPR of the Delhi-Panipat RRTS.
- 8 Feb 2023 - Delhi Government not agreed to provide financial support for Delhi-Panipat RRTS and Delhi-SNB RRTS, and also hasn't made full payment for Delhi-Meerut RRTS.
- 17 Dec 2023 - Delhi government expressed its willingness to grant an in-principle/administrative approval for Delhi-Panipat RRTS project, provided its share of contribution was met by the Centre.
- 31 Dec 2023 - Delhi government releases 50 crores as initial fund for Delhi-Panipat RRTS.
- 3 October 2025 – NCRTC begins pre-construction preparatory work, including utility diversion (power lines, cables, transformers) across ~22 km between Narela and Murthal (Sonipat).
- 12 November 2025 - PIB Approves Delhi-Panipat RRTS Corridor, enabling the project to proceed to the Union Cabinet for final sanction.

== See also ==
- Delhi–Alwar Regional Rapid Transit System
- Delhi–Meerut Regional Rapid Transit System
