= Sarai Kale Khan =

- Village
- Location in Southeast Delhi, India
- Coordinates: 28.5911°N 77.2578°E
- Country: India
- State: Delhi
- District: South East Delhi
- Named for: Kale Khan

Languages
  - Official: Hindi
- Time zone: UTC+5:30 (IST)
- PIN: 110013

Sarai Kale Khan is a neighborhood located in the South East Delhi district of Delhi and a major multimodal transport hub offering convenient transportation options, between Delhi Metro’s Pink line, nearby Sarai Kale Khan ISBT, semi-high-speed RRTS station, the planned high-speed rail and the adjacent Hazrat Nizamuddin Railway Station (one of Delhi's five major railway hubs).

== History ==
The name Sarai originates from the era of Afghan ruler Sher Shah Suri, who established a network of paved roads, with roadside inns known as serais placed every twelve miles to accommodate travellers. The area around Sarai Kale Khan hosted a caravanserai for travellers and caravans along the royal route connecting the Mughal imperial courts and Chandni Chowk in Shahjahanabad (now referred to as Old Delhi) to their retreat in Mehrauli, about 32 km (20 mi) away.

This sarai was named after Kale Khan, a Sufi saint from the 14th–15th century, whose resting place, along with that of another prominent Sufi saint from Delhi, is now located within the Delhi Airport complex, marking it as a historical site for travellers' respite.

Another theory speculating the origin of the suburb's name stems from Kale Khan's Gumbad, a structure from the Lodi era located in the Kotla Mubarakpur Complex in South Delhi. According to an inscription on the mihrab (prayer niche) inside the tomb, it dates back to 1481 AD. This other Kale Khan was a courtier during the reign of Sultan Bahlol Lodi (r. 1451–1589).

Nawab Faizullah Beg, son of Nawab Qasim Jan—a courtier during the reign of Mughal Emperor Shah Alam II (r. 1728–1806)—was also a courtier during the reign of the last Mughal Emperor Bahadur Shah Zafar. He built a complex that later became known as Ahata Kaley Sahab, christened after a saint called Kaley Khan who resided there for a time and after whom the area was subsequently named. The complex was later acquired by Bunyadi Begum, poet Mirza Ghalib's sister-in-law, and housed the poet after he was released from debtors' prison.

== Multi-model transport hub ==
Sarai Kale Khan multi-model transit transport hub is one of the major local, regional and long-distance multi-model transit transport hub entailing highways, rail, metro, semi-highspeed RRTS, and high-speed rail, etc co-located for the easy transfer from one mode of transport to another.

- Sarai Kale Khan ISBT: one of the major long-distance Inter-State Bus Terminal of Delhi caters to short and long-haul bus services to the cities and towns south and southeast of Delhi in neighbouring states of Haryana, Rajasthan, and Uttar Pradesh. It includes a DTC bus depot, supporting the Mudrika Seva and various other local bus routes within Delhi state.
- Hazrat Nizamuddin Railway Station: One of Delhi's five major railway hubs, which serves as both the originating and terminating point for 60 trains.
- Sarai Kale Khan Nizamuddin metro station of Delhi Metro's Pink Line:
- Sarai Kale Khan RRTS Interchange: for the Delhi NCR's regional semi-highspeed rail.
- Sarai Kale Khan HSR interchange: on the Delhi–Kolkata high-speed rail corridor and Delhi–Ahmedabad high-speed rail corridor of High-speed rail in India.

== See also ==
- Transport in Delhi
- Tourism in Delhi
