= Private Shared Wireless Network =

Wireless radio telecommunications network

A Private Shared Wireless Network (PSWN) is a wide area wireless radio telecommunications network developed and provided by different entities specifically for the use of public safety, utilities, machine to machine, and business communications. Its broad area coverage allows for a greater signal range and a lower cost of implementation. Public safety agencies and businesses utilize Private Shared Wireless Networks to send and receive data, communicate, and receive diagnostics information on their fixed equipment, vehicles or employees.

A Private Shared Wireless Network is built to operate on frequencies that are separate from those of public cellular communications networks and other publicly accessible wireless cellular or radio networks so to avoid their associated network congestion and security vulnerabilities.

== Background ==
Since 9/11, when data interoperability between first responders radio communications and interference issues with public networks led to loss of life, the US federal government has expressed a need for an interoperable communications networks for first responders.

One of the U.S. government's attempts at creating a private shared wireless network occurred in 2008, with FCC Spectrum Auction 73. The radio spectrum being sold was divided into five blocks, A, B, C, D and E. It was the D block that held special conditions placed upon the winner; mainly that whoever purchased this spectrum would be required to build out a next generation network that will also support public safety broadband services. The only bid on this block of spectrum did not meet the minimum reserve price, and thus the shared network was never realized.

As a result, many telecommunications equipment providers have begun building their own private shared networks, and selling various services and applications to businesses, such as AVL/GPS, asset tracking via RFID & barcode scanning, and 2-way messaging.

== Composition and function ==
A Private Shared Wireless Network is made up of multiple communications towers and base stations, each at a fixed location, spread about a given geographic area for ubiquitous coverage. The data exchange generally occurs between a company's assets via a vehicle mounted mobile data terminal, or via an RFID, and a central dispatching logistics center. This allows the dispatcher the ability to monitor and correct the performance of these assets remotely.

Private Shared Wireless Networks are generally engineered for data-only communications networks. This allows for a greater number of users on the network and more reliable communications, as data makes much more efficient use of wireless spectrum than does voice. Many regional and municipal governments have begun to create and engineer their own private networks over multiple tower infrastructures. Companies such as Cisco Systems have invested in Private Shared Wireless Networks as part of their strategic planning.

Private Shared Wireless Networks are an evolving solution addressing the communication and data requirements of government at the national, regional and municipal level, as well as utility companies, transportation companies and businesses which require a private solution operating via an established tower based network. US government mandates have fueled a need for first responders to operate in an interoperable manner. A Private Shared Wireless Network is a network available to businesses who seek an alternative from those hosted by cellular companies.
