= Duhai Depot RRTS station =

Railway station in Uttar Pradesh, India

Duhai Depot
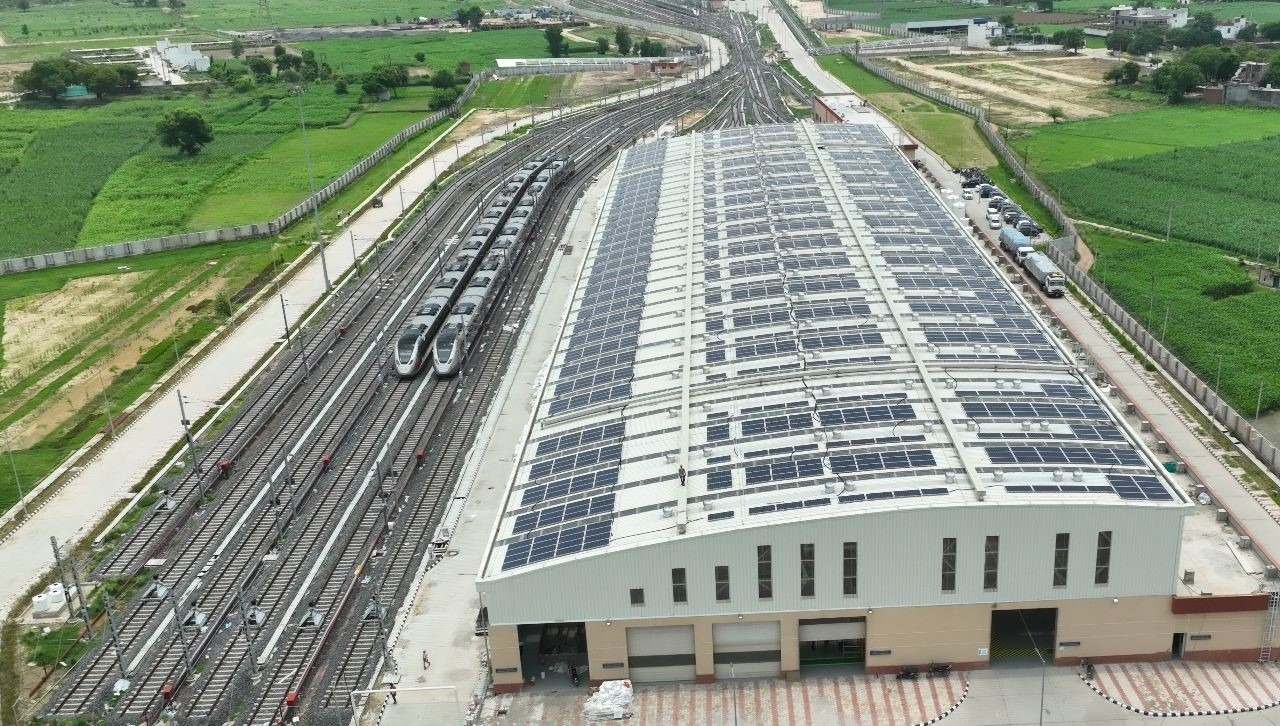

General information
- Location: Basantpur Saitli, Uttar Pradesh 201003; India
- Coordinates: 28.74208°N 77.46794°E
- System: Namo Bharat RRTS station
- Owner: NCRTC
- Operator: NCRTC
- Line: Delhi–Meerut
- Platforms: Side platform Platform-1 → Train Terminates Here; Platform-2 → Sarai Kale Khan
- Tracks: 2

Construction
- Structure type: At-Grade, Double track
- Platform levels: 1
- Parking: Four-Wheeler Parking
- Accessible: Yes

Other information
- Status: Operational

History
- Opened: 21 October 2023; 2 years ago
- Electrified: 25 kV 50 Hz AC through overhead catenary

Services
Preceding station	Namo Bharat	Following station
Duhai towards Sarai Kale Khan	Delhi–Meerut	Terminus
Route map
Location

Duhai Depot RRTS station is an At-Grade terminal RRTS station in Uttar Pradesh, India. It serves as a RRTS station for higher-speed trains on the Delhi–Meerut Regional Rapid Transit System that can reach speeds of up to 180 km/h. It is the depot for all Namo Bharat trainsets for maintenance purposes.

Duhai Depot RRTS station was commissioned on 20 October 2023 by Prime Minister Narendra Modi along with the 17 km long Sahibad-Duhai section of Delhi–Meerut RRTS and was opened to general public on 21 October 2023.

== History ==
The National Capital Region Transport Corporation (NCRTC) had invited tenders for the construction of the Duhai Depot RRTS station along with the 1.9 km long Duhai ramp–Duhai Depot section of the 82.15 km Delhi-Meerut RRTS line. Vijay Nirman Co. and KEC International (JV) emerged as the lowest bidder for construction work. As a result, under the agreement, companies started construction of Duhai Depot RRTS station.

== Station layout ==
The Duhai Depot RRTS station will have one level - platform with concourse and street level. Duhai Depot RRTS station will be 215 meters long and 26 meters wide.

G	Street level & Mezzanine	Exit/Entrance, Fare control, Station agent, Token vending machines, Crossover
P	Side platform | Doors will open on the left
P	Platform 1 Eastbound	Towards → Train Terminates Here
P	Platform 2 Westbound	Towards ← Sarai Kale Khan; Next Station: Duhai (Passengers heading towards Modipuram may alight at the next station)
P	Side platform | Doors will open on the left
P

There are 3 Gate points – 1, 2 and 3. Commuters can use either of the points for their travel:-

- Gate 1 - Towards Eastern Peripheral Highway (EPE)
- Gate 2 - Towards Eastern Peripheral Highway (EPE)
- Gate 3 - Towards Duhai Depot and Bhikanpur
