= Sarai Kale Khan Inter-State Bus Terminus =

Bus terminal complex in Delhi, India

Sarai Kale Khan Interstate Bus Terminus सराय काले खां अंतरराज्यीय बस टर्मिनस

General information
- Location: Sarai Kale Khan; South East Delhi district India
- Coordinates: 28.5852°N 77.2579°E
- System: DTC, HRST & RSRTC ISBT
- Owner: Delhi Tourism and Transportation Development Corporation
- Operator: Delhi Tourism and Transportation Development Corporation
- Bus operators: Delhi Transport Corporation; Haryana Roadways State Transport; Rajasthan State Road Transport Corporation
- Connections: Pink Line Sarai Kale Khan Nizamuddin; Sarai Kale Khan; Hazrat Nizamuddin

Construction
- Structure type: At-grade
- Parking: Yes
- Cycle facilities: No
- Accessible: Yes

Other information
- Website: https://dtidc.co.in/Home/sarikalekhan

History
- Opened: January 2005
Location
- Location within Delhi Location within India

Sarai Kale Khan Interstate Bus Terminus (Sarai Kale Khan ISBT), is one of the three Inter State Bus Terminals in Sarai Kale Khan, Delhi. It operates short and long-haul bus services between Delhi and the neighbouring states of Haryana, Uttar Pradesh, and Rajasthan.

As part of the Sarai Kale Khan multi-model transport hub located on the Inner Ring Road, the Sarai Kale Khan ISBT facilitates the transfer between the Sarai Kale Khan Inter-State Bus Terminal, Hazrat Nizamuddin railway station, Sarai Kale Khan Nizamuddin metro station, Sarai Kale Khan RRTS Interchange for the Delhi NCR's regional semi-highspeed rail, and the Sarai Kale Khan HSR interchange on the Delhi–Kolkata high-speed rail corridor and Delhi–Ahmedabad high-speed rail corridor.

== History ==
=== 1996: Origin ===
The terminus was built to decongest the overcrowded Maharana Pratap Interstate Bus Terminus located at Kashmiri Gate in North Delhi, which could not bear the burgeoning traffic. The construction of a new ₹80-crore terminus complex began in March 1996, and it was unveiled to the public in January 2005. It was later upgraded to accommodate the growing number of passengers.

=== Upgrade ===
In 2026, Dehi announced the Rs881 crore plan to upgrade 36.19 acre Anand Vihar ISBT to additional 557,000 sqm G+1 ISBT mixed use multimodal transport hub, which accommodated 64 bus bays in 2026, will have 100 bays by 2033, 123 by 2043 and 154 by 2053. 10% will be used for the ISBT operations, commercial 35% (retail shops, food courts, budget hotels, etc), 32%, residential, 11% government mass housing, 12% parking and utilities. Developed in the PPP-mode, the concession period for ISBT operations will be 30 years and 90 years for the real estate. ISBT will be upgraded in 24 months, and the real estate development will be over 48 months.

== Services ==
Sarai Kale Khan ISBT has following scheduled passenger bus serves

- Inter-state: to South Haryana, Rajasthan, Central and Southern Uttar Pradesh (Bundelkhand), and Central India regions.
- Local connectivity within Delhi NCR: provides direct connectivity to Noida, Gurgaon, and central Delhi hubs, as well as to other ISBTs in Delhi via regular Delhi Transport Corporation (DTC) bus services.

== See also ==
- Delhi
- Transport in Delhi
- Maharana Pratap Inter State Bus Terminus
- Sarai Kale Khan - Nizamuddin metro station
- Interstate Bus Terminals
- Swami Vivekanand Inter State Bus Terminus
