= Swami Vivekanand Inter State Bus Terminus =

Bus terminal complex in Delhi, India

Swami Vivekanand Interstate Bus Terminus Anand Vihar Interstate Bus Terminus स्वामी विवेकानन्द अंतरराज्यीय बस टर्मिनल आनंद विहार अंतरराज्यीय बस टर्मिनस
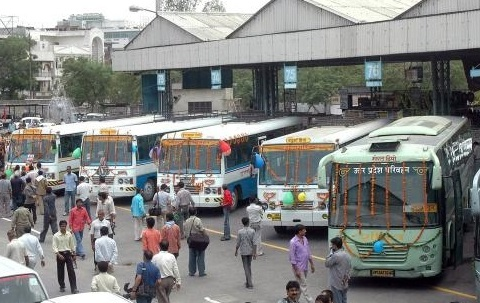

General information
- Location: Anand Vihar; National Capital Territory of Delhi; India
- Coordinates: 28°38′50″N 77°18′58″E
- System: DTC, UPSRTC & UTC ISBT
- Owner: Delhi Tourism and Transportation Development Corporation
- Operator: Delhi Tourism and Transportation Development Corporation
- Bus stands: 140
- Bus operators: Delhi Transport Corporation; Uttar Pradesh State Road Transport Corporation; Uttarakhand Transport Corporation
- Connections: Blue Line Pink Line Anand Vihar; Anand Vihar Terminal; Anand Vihar

Construction
- Parking: Yes
- Accessible: Yes

Other information
- Website: Swami Vivekanand ISBT

History
- Opened: March 1996
Location
- Location within Delhi Location within India

The Swami Vivekanand Interstate Bus Terminus (Swami Vivekanand ISBT), commonly referred to as the Anand Vihar Interstate Bus Terminus (Anand Vihar ISBT), is one of Delhi's three Inter-State Bus Terminals. Located in Anand Vihar, it serves as a major hub for bus services connecting Delhi with neighbouring states, primarily Uttar Pradesh and Uttarakhand.

== History ==
In 1993, construction of a new ISBT at Anand Vihar began which was completed and opened to the passenger service in March 1996. It was built to decongest the overcrowded Maharana Pratap Interstate Bus Terminus, which was unable to bear the increasing traffic.

After the renovation of Maharana Pratap Interstate Bus Terminus in 2013, there have been plans to renovate Swami Vivekanand ISBT. Delhi Development Authority also renovated Anand Vihar ISBT, on an area of 9.2 hectares at a cost of Rs 200 crore.

In 2026, Dehi announced the Rs7,600 crore plan to upgrade 25 acre Anand Vihar ISBT to additional 79,802 sqm G+1 ISBT mixed use multimodal transport hub, which accommodated 154 bus bays in 2026, will be able to manage 178 bays by 2033, 220 by 2043 and 266 by 2053. 70% (55,861 sqm) will be used for the ISBT operations, 8% for retail shops and food courts, 14% for office spaces, 8% for and a budget hotel. The total proposed built-up area is about 79,802 square metres. Developed in the DBFOT-mode, the concession period for ISBT operations will be 30 years and 90 years for the real estate. ISBT will be upgraded in 24 months, and the real estate development will be over 48 months.

== Services ==
The Anand Vihar ISBT serves as Delhi's primary link to the neighboring states of Uttar Pradesh and Uttarakhand, with approximately 1,500 interstate buses departing daily. In addition to interstate services, the terminus also accommodates local DTC and cluster buses, with around 1,800 to 2,000 buses operating within the city each day.

Anand Vihar ISBT (Viveka Nand IBT) has following scheduled passenger bus serves

- Inter-state: to Eastern Uttar Pradesh (Purvanchal e.g. Lucknow, Gorakhpur, Varanasi), Bihar, Uttarakhand, Noida and Ghaziabad areas.
- Local connectivity within Delhi NCR: provides direct connectivity to Noida, Gurgaon, and central Delhi hubs, as well as to other ISBTs in Delhi via regular Delhi Transport Corporation (DTC) bus services.

== Multi-model connections ==
Swami Vivekanand ISBT is located adjacent to the Anand Vihar Terminal railway station, Anand Vihar metro station, and the Anand Vihar RRTS station.

== See also ==
- Transport in Delhi
- Anand Vihar Terminal railway station
- Anand Vihar metro station
