= Sarai Kale Khan RRTS station =

Upcoming RapidX's Delhi–Meerut RRTS station

Sarai Kale Khan
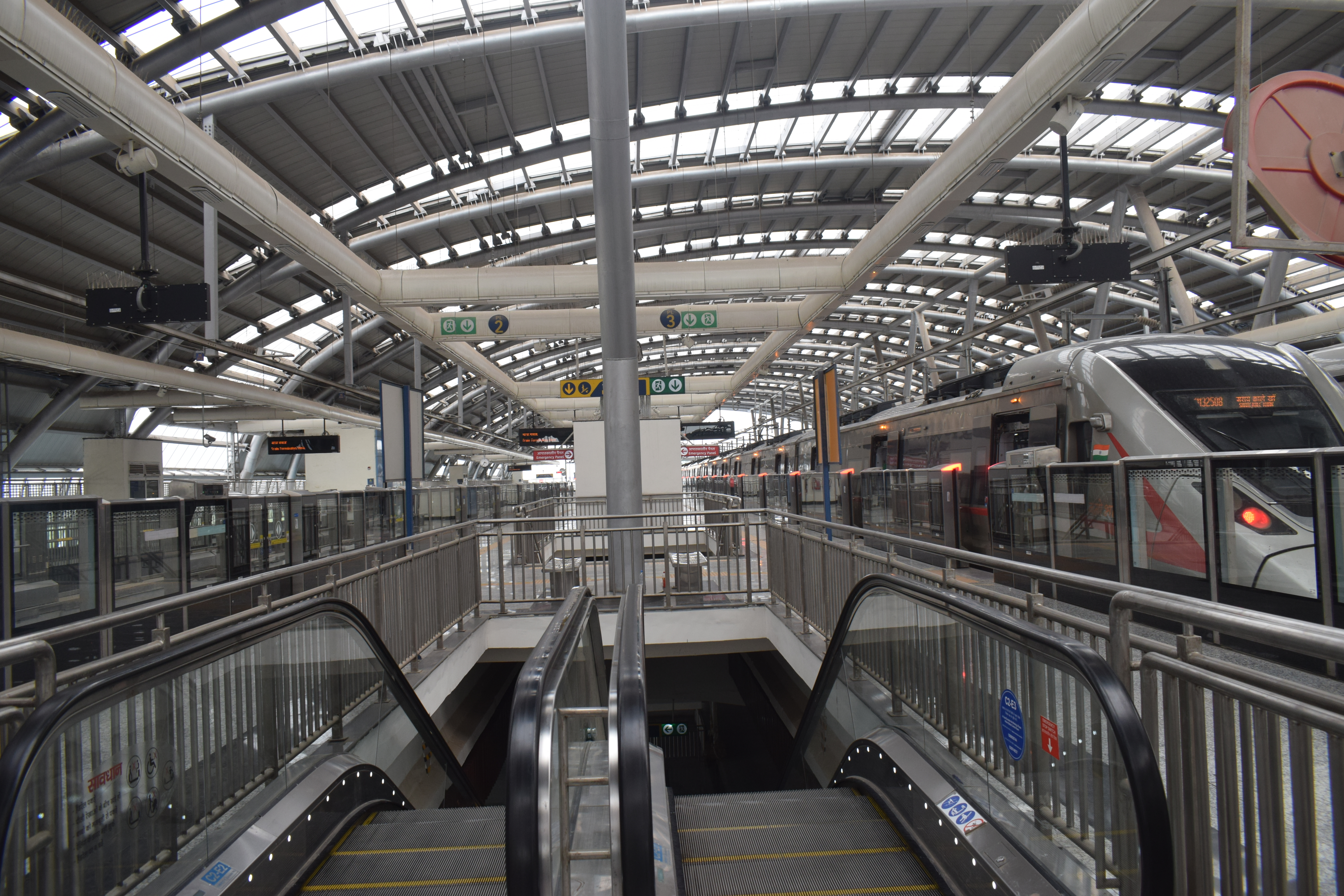
- Sarai Kale Khan RRTS station

General information
- Location: Sarai Kale Khan, South East Delhi, Delhi; India
- Coordinates: 28.588512°N 77.258407°E
- System: Namo Bharat RRTS station
- Owner: NCRTC
- Operator: RapidX
- Lines: Delhi–Meerut; Delhi–Alwar Delhi–Sonipat–Panipat
- Platforms: 6
- Tracks: 4
- Connections: Pink Line Sarai Kale Khan Nizamuddin; Hazrat Nizamuddin; Sarai Kale Khan ISBT

Construction
- Structure type: Elevated
- Parking: Yes

Other information
- Status: Operational

History
- Opening: 22 February 2026; 6 months ago

Services
| Preceding station | Namo Bharat | Following station |
|---|---|---|
| Terminus | Delhi–Meerut | New Ashok Nagar towards Modipuram |
Planned Services
| Terminus | Delhi–Alwar | INA towards SNB or Alwar |
| Terminus | Delhi–Sonipat–Panipat | Indraprastha towards Sonipat or Panipat |
Route map
Location
- Interactive map

Sarai Kale Khan RRTS station is an elevated terminal semi-high-speed-rail station located in the South East Delhi district of Delhi, India. This station caters to trains operating on the RapidX network, capable of reaching speeds up to 180 km/h. It is the terminus and originating station for three priority RRTS corridors in Phase I: Delhi–Meerut, Delhi–Panipat, and Delhi–Alwar. Currently, only the Delhi–Meerut corridor is operational; construction on the other two corridors has not yet commenced.

Commencement of operations at the Sarai Kale Khan RRTS station was plagued with several delays, with the station missing several deadlines in succession: June, mid-September, and late September of 2025. Officials overseeing the project stated that while all the civil works and trial runs concluded as scheduled, the station would not be rendered operational until the Prime Minister inaugurates it.

Following successive delays, the station was finally made operational on February 22, 2026. With this, the entirety of the Delhi-Meerut RRTS network became functional too.

== History ==
The National Capital Region Transport Corporation, a joint venture between the Government of India and the governments of the states of Delhi, Uttar Pradesh, Rajasthan, and Haryana, invited tenders in February 2020 for the construction of the Sarai Kale Khan RRTS station, along with the 4.3 km stretch from Sarai Kale Khan to New Ashok Nagar of the 82.15 km Delhi-Meerut RRTS line. Afcons Infrastructure was entrusted with the construction of the station.

== Station layout ==
The Sarai Kale Khan RRTS station features six elevated platforms, with the station building constructed below the platform level. These six platforms serve four tracks dedicated to regular train services.

The Sarai Kale Khan RRTS station will consist of three levels: platform, concourse, and street level. It will be 215 meters long and 50 meters wide, with the station constructed 15 meters above ground level.

=== Station Layout (TBC) ===
| G | Street Level | Exit/Entrance |
| L1 | Mezzanine | Fare control, station agent, Metro Card vending machines, crossover |
| L2 | Side platform | Opening of Doors (TBC) |
| L2 | Platform # | ← Under Construction → |
| L2 | Island platform | P# and P# Opening of Doors (TBC) |
| L2 | Platform # | ← Under Construction → |
| L2 | Platform # | ← Under Construction → |
| L2 | Island platform | P# and P# Opening of Doors (TBC) |
| L2 | Platform # | ← Under Construction → |
| L2 | Side platform | Opening of Doors (TBC) |
| L2 |
