= List of Gurjars =

List of People belonging to Gurjar Community

Gurjar are an ethnic group in India, Afghanistan and Pakistan. Notable people from the community include:

== India ==
=== Historical figures ===
- Prataprao Gujar, military leader of Shivaji Maharaj's Army.
- Nain Singh Nagar of Parichhatgarh was a notable Gurjar king of Meerut district in the Indian state of Uttar Pradesh in the 18th century.
- Vijay Singh Pathik, was among the first Indian revolutionaries who lit the torch of freedom movement against British rule
- Dhan Singh, played an important role during the Indian Rebellion of 1857

=== Education and social reform ===
- Masud Choudhary, was the founding Vice Chancellor of Baba Ghulam Shah Badshah University in Rajouri and Chief Patron of the Gurjar Desh Charitable Trust, Jammu.

=== Gurjar writers ===
- Javaid Rahi, is a Gurjar (Khatana) researcher of India. He has authored 12 books in Gujari/Gojri Urdu and English and edited more than 300 books/magazines highlighting the history, culture, and literature related to indigenous communities such as Gurjar and Bakarwals.

=== Armed forces ===
- Fazal Din VC, ran through the chest in Burma by a Japanese samurai officer's sword reaching through to his back and proceeded to pull the sword out of his chest and kill the Japanese officer with it.
- Kirori Singh Bainsla, a retired officer of the Indian Army and leader of a Gurjar reservation movement in Rajasthan
- Kuldip Singh Chandpuri, retired officer of the Indian Army who was awarded the Maha Vir Chakra for his actions at the Battle of Longewala.
- Abdur Rahim Khan, Commander-in-Chief of the Pakistan Air Force during Operation Chengiz Khan

=== Indian independence movement ===
- Ram Chandra Vikal, freedom fighter, Deputy Chief Minister of Uttar Pradesh.
- Kadam Singh, Raja of Parikshitgarh and Mawana, led Gurjar fight against the British during the Indian Rebellion of 1857.

=== Politics ===
- Iqra Hasan, a politician from Kairana, Uttar Pradesh
- Rajesh Pilot, politician of the Indian National Congress party who represented the Dausa in Lok Sabha
- Pranav Singh, former MLA of Khanpur
- Malook Nagar, MP of Bijnor
- Govind Singh Gurjar, (9 March 1932 – 6 April 2009) was a Gujjar from Rajasthan who served as Lt. Governor of Puducherry in India.
- Mian Bashir Ahmed, (born November 1923) is a politician and a Caliph of Islamic Sufi order (Naqshbandi, Majadadi, Larvi). He is the first Gurjar from Jammu and Kashmir who was awarded the Padma Bhushan (the third highest civilian award), by the government of India on 26 January 2008 for his contribution to the society.
- Hukum Singh, former Member of Parliament from Kairana constituency of Uttar Pradesh
- Yashpal Singh, former member of Parliament from Saharanpur constituency of Uttar Pradesh
- Narayan Singh, former deputy Chief Minister of Uttar Pradesh
- Virendra Singh, former member of Parliament from Uttar Pradesh
- Sanjay Singh Chauhan, former member of Parliament from Bijnor constituency of Uttar Pradesh
- Ashok Katariya, Indian BJP politician from Uttar Pradesh

=== Criminals ===
- Nirbhay Singh Gurjar

== Pakistan ==
=== Pakistan Independence Movement ===
- Choudhry Rahmat Ali, was a Pakistani nationalist who is credited with creating the name "Pakistan" for a separate Muslim homeland in South Asia and is generally known as the originator of the Pakistan Movement.

=== Government ===
- Fazal Ilahi Chaudhry, was a Pakistani politician and lawyer who served as the Speaker of National Assembly and President of Pakistan.

=== Sports ===
- Shoaib Akhtar, is a former cricketer and commentator. Nicknamed the "Rawalpindi Express", he was the first bowler to be recorded bowling at 100 miles per hour, a feat he achieved twice in his career.
- Mohammad Asif, is a former Pakistani cricketer who played for the Pakistan national cricket team between 2005 and 2010.

=== Social and Welfare ===
- Hafiz Saeed, Pakistani Islamist and founder of many religious and welfare organisations

=== Literature ===
- Mian Muhammad Bakhsh, was a renowned Punjabi poet and Sufi scholar for the people of Punjab and Kashmir.

== See also ==
- List of Gurjar clans
