= Dabthla =

- Village
- Nickname: Dabthla
- Location in Uttar Pradesh, India Dabthla (India) Dabthla (Asia)
- Coordinates: 29.94°N 77.89°E
- Country: India
- State: Uttar Pradesh
- District: Meerut

Language
- Time zone: UTC+5:30 (IST)
- PIN: 250406
- Sex ratio: ♂/♀

Dabthla is a village situated in Machhra Mandal/ block of Meerut District in Uttar Pradesh, India.
