= Kadam Singh =

Kadam Singh was a leader who fought against the British East India Company during the Indian Rebellion of 1857. During the rebellion, he was the Raja (King) of Parikshitgarh and Mawana in Meerut district.
