= Dhan Singh (name) =

Dhan Singh is a given name and may refer to:

- Dhan Singh Rawat, Minister of Higher Education of Uttarakhand
- Dhan Singh Rawat (Rajasthan politician), former Member of the Lok Sabha
- Dhan Singh, Indian freedom fighter
- Dhan Singh Thapa, Indian Army officer
- Dhan Singh Negi, former Member of the Uttarakhand Legislative Assembly
- P. Dhansingh, member of the 14th Tamil Nadu Legislative Assembly

Village

- Akarli Dhansingh, Village in Rajasthan
