= Niloha =

Niloha is a village in Meerut District of Uttar Pradesh, India. It is situated at a distance of 7 km from Mawana, 15 km from Hastinapur and 24 km from Meerut. It is a peaceful and prosperous village. The primary occupation of the citizens of this village is agriculture. It is primarily a Jat dominant village. There are three temples and two mosques situated in Niloha. One Inter college, three government primary schools and two private public schools are also there. One government primary health center and one government ayuvedic clinic are also there. One electrical feeder is also there in Niloha. A big kanya pathshala, land for which was donated by Chaudhary Jaipal Singh exists there.

Niloha village is also famous for the Jahar vir Mela celebration during the Hindu month of Shravan.
