= Karnawal =

Karnawal may refer to:

- Karnawal, Meerut, a town and a nagar panchayat in Meerut district, Uttar Pradesh, India
- Karnawal (film), a 2020 coming-of-age drama film
