= Fatehapur Narayan =

Village in Uttar Pradesh, India

Fatehpur Narayan फतेहपुर नारायण
- Village
- Fatehpur Narain
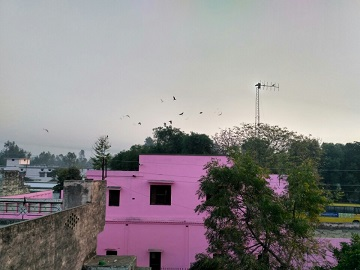

- Location in Uttar Pradesh
- Coordinates: 28°51′45″N 78°00′09″E

Fatehapur Narayan is a village in the Mawana Tehsil of Meerut district of Uttar Pradesh. It has two intermediate colleges. The literacy rate of village is 93.2%. The female literacy rate is 94.2%. There is a temple who made jeeto jatnee and chajju singh jatt in 1931.Caste-wise, the majority of Hindus, mainly Tyagis (Brahmins), dominate the village.

== Location and Administration ==
The name of Fatehpur Narain village gram panchayat is Fatehpur Narayan. Its distance from sub district headquarter Mawana is 33 km and from headquarter Meerut is 31 km. Nearest town is Kithor at a distance of 6 km.

== Demography ==
The village has 551 houses and its population of 3442 of which 1617 are female and 1825 are male.

== Education ==
There are primary and secondary private and government schools in the village. It also has a government degree college.

== Agriculture ==
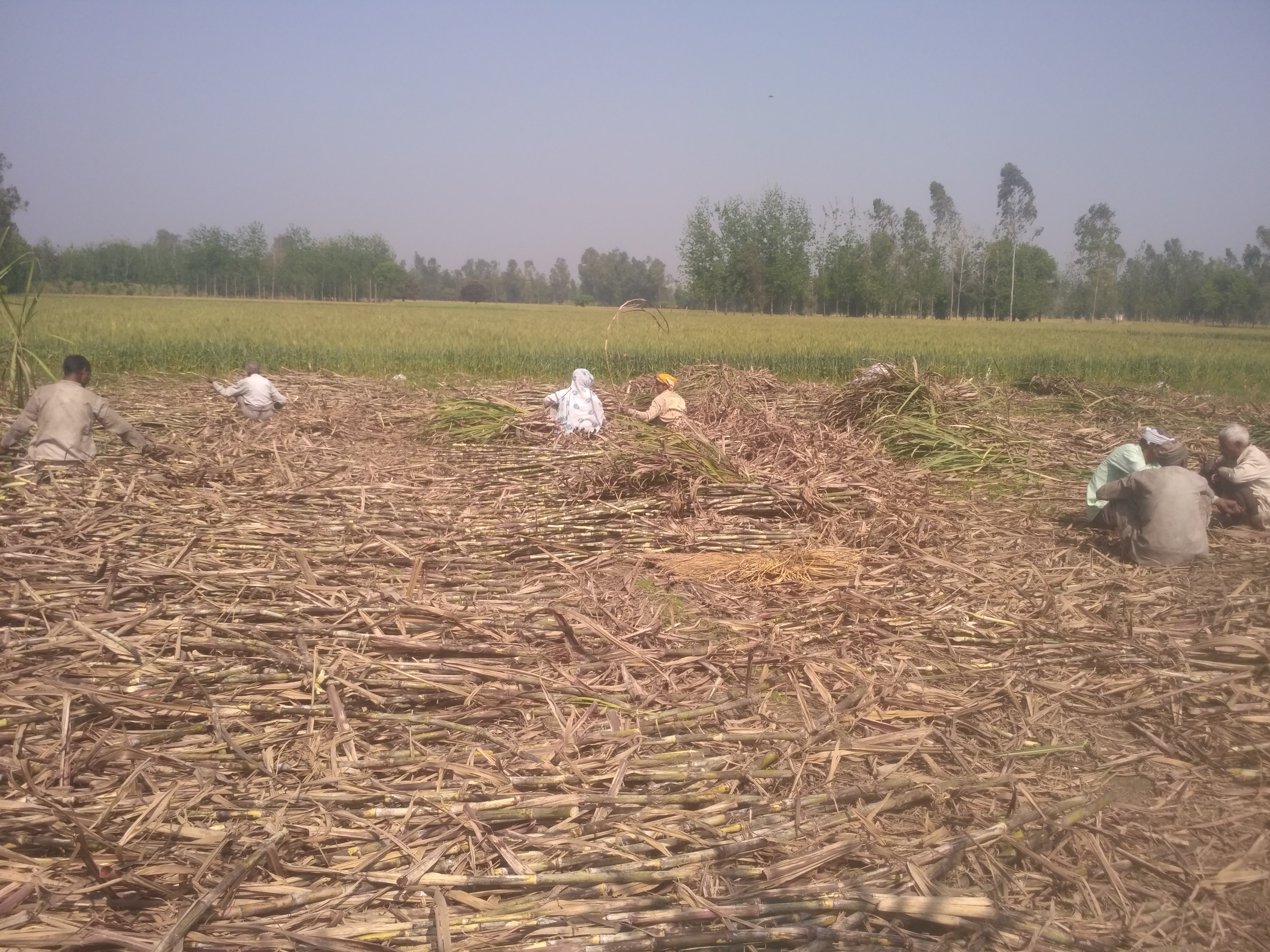
Sugarcane production

Sugarcane, paddy, mangoes and wheat are main agricultural commodities grown in this village. Gur handicraft items are also created here. The village gets 6 hours of agricultural power supply in summers and 8 hours of agricultural power supply in winters. Total irrigated area here is 485.9 hectares. Canals contribute to 116.12 hectares and tube wells support 369.78 hectares of land.

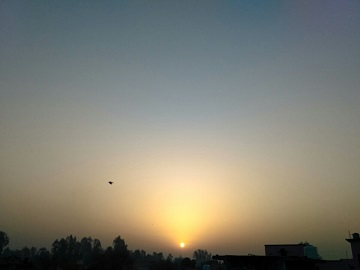
Morning Time in Fatehpur Narayan

== Communication ==
The village has a sub post office, landline telephone and mobile phone network facilities. The nearest private courier facility is at 5 km from the village.

== Transportation ==
Animal driven carts, auto rickshaw and cycle rickshaw are the main transport facilities available in the village. The nearest bus and train services are located at 5 km.
