= Kaland, India =

Kaland
- village
- Location in Uttar Pradesh, India Kaland (India)
- Coordinates: 29°10′N 77°35′E
- Country: India
- State: Uttar Pradesh
- District: Meerut
- Tehsil: Sardhana

Government
  - Type: Panchayati raj (India)
  - Body: Gram panchayat

Population (2011)
  - Total: 4,497

Languages
- Time zone: UTC+5:30 (IST)
- PIN: 250342
- Vehicle registration: UP-
- Website: UP 15

Kaland is a village in Meerut district. It is 6 km (3.7 mi) from Sardhana and 22 km (14 mi) from Meerut, It's nearest village Chhur from 2 km (1.2 mi). The total geographical area of village is 543.199 hectares, It is famous for cane sugars and Gur sweets.

The nearest railway station to Kaland is Sakhoti Tanda which is located in and around 13.8 km (8.6 mi) distant. Kaland Villagers have focus over education that's why having large number of government employees such as orthopaedic surgeon Dr Md Asif Ali, Dr Vikas Tyagi, Professor, Thapar University belongs to this village.

== Demographics ==
Kaland is a large village with about 736 families residing, It has population of 4497 of which 2382 are males while 2115 are females as per Population Census 2011. Average sex ratio of Kaland village is 888 which is lower than Uttar Pradesh state average of 912. Child sex ratio for the Kaland as per census is 780, lower than Uttar Pradesh average of 902.

Kaland village has higher literacy rate compared to Uttar Pradesh. In 2011, literacy rate of Kaland village was 72.21% compared to 67.68% of Uttar Pradesh. World famous orthopaedic surgeon Dr Md Asif Ali and cardiologist Dr Akram belongs to this village. As per constitution of India and Panchyati Raaj Act, Kaland village is administrated by Sarpanch (Head of Village) who is elected representative of village.
