= Sadat Colony =

Karachi neighbourhood

Sadat Colony Karachi Block 20 is located in Gulberg town in Karachi, Pakistan. It is a name of block 20 of Federal B Area, Karachi and has a predominantly Shia population of around 99%. Initially it was the project of Sadat colony near Karachi airport in the early 1960s but because of expanded airport plans a few blocks of a proposed colony in that area was shifted to a newly formed subdivision of Karachi named F.B Area block 20. Four lanes of Block 20 constituting 1000, 400 and 200 yard square houses were allotted to Sadat Colony trust. Later on more Sadat (plural of Sayyed) moved to this block in 120 yard houses. Adjacent to block 20 there is block 19 of Federal B Area in which Muhajir from a town called Incholi, Uttar Pradesh, India have settle. People from Incholi, Uttar Pradesh, India were all non-Sadat Sunni and used to work in alcohol brewery before partition. Initially Shia Sadat elders didn't like the idea of Sadat colony being called as Incholi for that particular reason. Syed Mahmood ul Hasan Rizvi who was the renowned Shia ideologue and thinker of Karachi lived in A 47 Block 20. He never liked the idea of calling Sadat colony as Incholi However as bus stop used to be called incholi by the public bus conductors new generation slowly abandoned the real name "Sadat Colony". All elders died with passage of time and now whole Sadat colony is known by misnomer "Incholi".
