= Bahsuma =

Bahsuma Bhishma Nagri
- Town
- Location in Uttar Pradesh, India
- Coordinates: 29.22°N 77.97°E
- Country: India
- State: Uttar Pradesh
- District: Meerut
- Named for: Bhishma Pitamah

Government
  - Type: Chairman
- Elevation: 223 m (732 ft)

Population (2001)
  - Total: 10,561

Languages
  - Official: Hindi
- Time zone: UTC+5:30 (IST)
- Postal code: 250404

Bahsuma or Behsuma is a town and a nagar panchayat in Meerut district in the state of Uttar Pradesh, India. It is an ancient town of Mahabharata. It is basically known for being the birthplace of Bhism Pitamah.

Bahsuma is located near the famous Mahabharata Place, which is just 5 km away.

== Geography ==
Bahsuma is located at 29.22°N 77.97°E. It has an average elevation of 223 metres (731 feet).

== History ==
In the days of Mahabharta (A great epic of India), its name was Bhishma Puri. It was the place of Great Bhishma Pitamah (the Son of Ganga). According to the tradition, Bahsuma was a muhalla of Hastinapur (which is about 5 km south-east of the village) and served as the treasury of the Kauravas and Pandavas, the place deriving its name from 'vasu' which means treasure. In the times of Raja Nain Singh Nagar of Parikshitgarh, it became the headquarters of the government. The house of the Raja Nain Singh and a fort built by him still stand in the village.

=== Jain Temple ===
Behsuma is home to Shri Digambara Jain Atishay Ksetra, a Jain pilgrimage site dedicated to Bhagwan Chandraprabha, the eighth Tirthankara of Jainism. The temple houses a standing (khadgasana) image of Chandraprabha, which is traditionally believed by devotees to date from the fourth era (Chaturth kaal). The temple is reported to be approximately 250 years old.

Chandraprabhu Bhagwan Idol at Shri Digamabar Jain Atishay Kshetra

According to a local Jain tradition, Jain idols were discovered during excavation work associated with the Ganga Canal. The idols were reportedly being transported by bullock cart to the Digambara Jain Bada Mandir at Hastinapur. During the journey, the cart stopped at Bahsuma for the night. When the travellers attempted to continue their journey the following morning, the cart reportedly could not be moved despite repeated efforts. This event was interpreted as a religious sign that the idol were meant to remain at Bahsuma.

Following this incident, land was reportedly provided by a member of the local Jain community for the establishment of a temple. The idols were installed at the site, which subsequently developed into a Digambara Jain pilgrimage centre. The temple is also associated with an image of Bhagwan Pārśvanātha.

The temple is known for its tall architectural spire (Shikhara), reported to be approximately 200 feet high. The precise date and circumstances of the original idol discovery, as well as the historical origins of the temple, require further documentary and archaeological verification.

== Demographics ==
As of 2001 India census, Bahsuma had a population of 10,561. Males constitute 53% of the population and females 47%. Bahsuma has an average literacy rate of 58%, lower than the national average of 59.5%; with 60% of the males and 40% of females literate. 17% of the population is under 6 years of age.
