= Havildar Anuj Kumar =

Indian bodybuilder

- हवलदार अनुज कुमार
- Born: Chhur, Meerut, Uttar Pradesh, India
- Occupation: Bodybuilder
- Awards: 2019 World Bodybuilding Championships (gold medal)

Anuj Kumar Taliyan (हवलदार अनुज कुमार) is an Indian professional bodybuilder. He was born into a Hindu Jat family. He won the gold medal at the 11th World Bodybuilding Championships, held on Jeju Island in South Korea in November 2019. He is one of the most successful bodybuilders in India. He has won many national and international titles.

Taliyan was fond of wrestling in his school days and took up bodybuilding seriously after joining the Indian Army in 2010. In 2019 he was a havildar in the Madras Engineer Group.

In 2018, he won the Mr India title at the 12th National Body Building Championship. In 2019 he again won the 100+ kg category at the Senior Nationals, held in Chennai. The 2019 world championships were his first international tournament, and his gold medal there was the first for an Indian in the 100+ kg category. He also won a gold medal at the 54th Asian Bodybuilding and Physique Sports Championships 2022, held in the Maldives.
