= Daurala =

- Town
- Location in Uttar Pradesh, India
- Coordinates: 29.113°N 77.703°E
- Country: India
- State: Uttar Pradesh
- District: Meerut
- Elevation: 223 m (732 ft)

Population (2001)
  - Total: 10,684

Languages
  - Official: Hindi
- Time zone: UTC+5:30 (IST)
- PIN: 250221
- Telephone code: 01237...

Daurala is a town and a nagar panchayat in Meerut district in the state of Uttar Pradesh, India.

Daurala is also the headquarters of Daurala development block, which falls under Sardhana tehsil in Meerut district.

== Geography ==
Daurala is located at 29.113°N 77.703°E. It has an average elevation of 223 metres (731 feet). Daurala is situated 84 km in north from national capital Delhi. Daurala town falls on national highway 58 and has a dual right angled metalled road to make a square route (Chaudhary Charan Singh Chowk), one of this road is joining Daurala to Baraut while other to national highway 119 at Masuri (Meerut). The construction of a new flyover that connects commuters to Sardhana town has been completed.

== Demographics ==
As of 2001 India census, Daurala had a population of 10,684. Males constitute 54% of the population and females 46%. Daurala has an average literacy rate of 56%, lower than the national average of 59.5%: male literacy is 65% and, female literacy is 45%. In Daurala, 17% of the population is under 6 years of age.
