= 2014 Meerut riots =

- Date: 10 May 2014 – 10 May 2014
- Location: Meerut, Uttar Pradesh, India; 28.98°N 77.70°E
- Caused by: Scuffle between two communities over fence construction around a well escalated into riot

Violence and action
- Deaths: 3
- Injuries: 50
- Location of riots in Uttar Pradesh, India

On 10 May 2014, a scuffle between two communities over construction of fence around well escalated into riots in Meerut, Uttar Pradesh, a northern state of India As of 11 May, 3 people were killed and 50 injured, including a top police officer and two media persons.

== Background ==
Two local groups in Meerut were staking claims in a well which has been directed by court to be maintained at status quo. But, in-charge of nearby mosque had started to construct concrete fence around the well. The incident started at around 2 pm on 10 May in the Teer Gehran area of Meerut. There have been various theories regarding the cause of violence. While Times of India reported that this construction of fence paved way for riots, the New Indian Express reported that installation of water facilitation centre was objected by members from Jain community arguing that it would affect their temple, which started the riots.

== Clashes ==
While the cause of riot was uncertain, the argument between the two communities escalated into shouting of slogans against each other. Soon violence erupted and vehicles were set fire. Stone pelting and firing of arms were done by members of both communities. Few police personnel who tried to control the mob faced injuries.

One person succumbed to bullet wound, while other injured were being taken to local hospitals.

== Security ==
Police sources stated that patrolling has been intensified. Six companies of Provincial Armed Constabulary and Eight companies of Rapid Action Force has been deployed to restore peace Shops were closed in the area due to rioting.

Criminal Cases were registered against 200 people in connection with the riots and Nauchandi Mela has been wound up before its scheduled end. According to Meerut SP Om Prakash Singh, the police have identified some criminals from a video footage.

== Arrest ==
Two persons were held after the victim succumbed to injuries.
