= Shahjahanpur, Meerut =

Shahjahanpur is a town in the state of Uttar Pradesh in India, located about 25 kilometres from the district headquarters at Meerut. It has a population of 26075, the majority of whom are Muslim. There are also about 600 households of Hindus in the village, mainly belonging to the Jatav caste and other .

Shahjahanpur is also known as "Mango Market", as it exports fruit like mango and lychee to markets around the country.

== History ==
The village is named after the Mughal Emperor Shahjahan, and was said to have been founded by Mohammed Abbas Khan, a Dilazak Pashtun. Abbas Khan was granted an estate by the Mughal Emperor, who named the village in his honour. A significant portion of the village's population still belongs to the Dilazak tribe. Other Muslim groups include the RaiBhaat, Qureshi and Ansari.

Shahjahanpur fought in the freedom fighting moment of India under the leadership of Babuji Ilhamullah Khan, Firoz Mand Khan, Pandit Chandi Prasad and Maulana Mujtaba Khan Rahmani.

Shahjahanpur organised a mango festival in 1992, in collaboration with the Punjab Department of Horticulture.

== Economy ==
Shahjahanpur's economy is largely agricultural. Exports include fruit (including mango, peaches, pears, and lychee), timber, and ornamental plants (such as Gulabjamun, Dasehri, Chonsa, and Ratol). The town has a number of jobs in agriculture and plant nurseries, which has attracted wage workers from neighbouring towns and villages. It has attracted wholesale customers, suppliers, and exporters from all the states of the country as well as Bangladesh, Nepal, and China.

== Culture ==
Maulana Mohammed Dawood Khan Rahmani was a profile author who translated Muqaddamah Ibne Khaldun and Tafseer Ibne Kaseer into Urdu language.
