= Palra (Meerut) =

Village in Meerut District, Uttar Pradesh, India

Palra is a village situated in the Hastinapur Mandal of Meerut District in the state of Uttar Pradesh in India.

It is 4.245 km distance from Hastinapur, and 30.65 km from the district headquarters in Meerut. It has a population of about 4034 persons living in around 607 households. Most of the population belong to the Gurjar Hindu community.Nishant Bhati also lived in this village who runs rafale academy.
