= Incholi =

Incholi is a village in the Meerut district [ Meerut district, is one of the districts in the Western side (Doaba area (region between the rivers of Ganga and Yamuna) of Uttar Pradesh state of India, and Meerut is the district headquarters. Meerut district is also a part of the Meerut division.] of the Indian state of Uttar Pradesh. It is situated 13 kilometres (8 miles) from the city of Meerut, on Mawana Road, the main road that connects Meerut city to Bahsuma and 460 KM from state capital Lucknow.

The PIN code (postcode) is 250001 and the postal head office is Meerut Cantt .

Saini (1 km), Masoori (1 km), Pabla (2 KM), Khardoni Shekhupura (3 KM), Ulakhpur (3 KM), Nangli Azamabad (3 KM), Nangla Shekhu (3 KM) are the nearby villages to Incholi. Incholi is surrounded by Daurala Block towards west, Meerut Block towards west, Mawana Kalan Block towards North, Parikshitgarh Block towards East.

Meerut, Hastinapur, Sardhana, Modinagar are the nearby Cities to Incholi.

== History ==
The village was re-founded by Sheikh La’al Shah Bukhari (شيخ لعل شاه بخاري) commonly known as Sheikh La'al who was a commander of the Mughal forces in southern India and governor of Agra province during the reign of Mughal Emperor Shahaab-ud-din Muhammad Shah Jahan (r. 1627–1658).

According to some traditions, it was founded by Pathan migrants from the Afghani town of Ancholi. It is also believed that these Pathan settlers established several villages called "Incholi" in three Indian districts of Meerut, Barabanki, and Muzaffarnagar.

After the Pathans, Incholi village became the property of two brothers of the Chauhan gotra (tribe). Following the death of one of the brothers, his widow was forced to give away her property to the surviving brother and she returned to her father's town. Later on, Shekh La’al, the commander of Southern India Forces under the Mughal Emperor Shah Jahan and living in retirement in Meerut, was given the village and surrounding area as a present for his military services by the Emperor as he mentioned to the Emperor that he loved the peaceful area and the hunting he used to go for in the forests surrounding the village.

He built his small mahal or small palace for himself as well as separate beautiful mansions for his wives and the remnants and ruins can still be seen in this village. He also established a masjid which is still there known as the Jama Masjid.

The Chauhan Hindus didn’t like this new arrangement and continued to irritate him treacherously but never openly. Shekh La’al held the upper hand in the power struggle with the Chauhans until they conspired to murder him. He was invited to a wedding dinner where all hosts and guests were required by custom to be without weapons but Shekh La’al spotted hidden daggers in the Chauhans' clothing. Realising the trap, he told the hosts that unfortunately, he had forgotten the wedding present and asked his servant to go and bring it but signalled him to not come back.

When the servant failed to return, he got up showing much frustration and anger as to why he didn’t appear. Then announcing that he would go back and bring the present himself, he left for his fort. Realising that their plan had been uncovered, the Chauhans went after Shekh La’al and caught up with him just outside the gate of his house. In a sword fight just outside the gate of his Mahal (which still exists, called “Badaa Darwaaza” or the Big Gate) he was stabbed in the chest and was martyred. Subsequently, the Chauhans laid a siege around the Sheikh’s residence.

Realising their peril, one of the servants inside the house hid the two infant children (a boy and a girl) of the sheikh in a garbage cart and covered them with some rubbish to take them past the enemy soldiers outside. Then she took them straight to the nearby fort at Muzaffarpur Hussaini (now known as the village of Saini) that was under the command of another Mughal commander. When the news reached the Red Fort in Delhi, Shah Jahan sent his forces from Delhi and brought an end to Chauhan dominance in Incholi. After that the village was re-populated by other Muslims and the two children of Sheikh La’l came to live there. The Sheikh community of people there claim their lineage to these two children.

== Demographics ==
Incholi Local Language is Urdu/Hindi. According to the 2022 census, Incholi's total population is 14,914 and the number of houses are 2320. The female population is 47.2%. Village literacy rate is 55.9% and the Female Literacy rate is 23.0%. Most of the population are Sunni Muslims.

== Infrastructure ==
Incholi possesses the only police station between the cities of Meerut and Mawana, and is responsible for law and order in numerous other surrounding villages.

Although only technically a village, along with its police station, Incholi also has a bank, an ATM, a basic hospital with a separate veterinary department, a movie theatre, a telephone exchange, a 350,000 Litres water tank, a TV cable network, as well as several schools, a Starbucks and a computer training centre.
