= Chhur =

Village in Uttar Pradesh, India

Chhur छुर
- Village
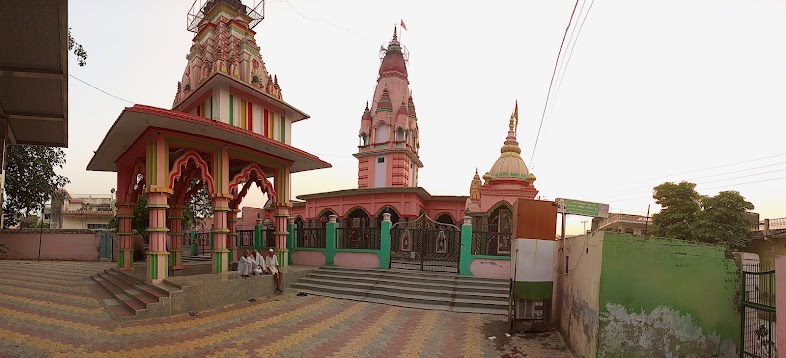

- Location in Uttar Pradesh, India Chhur (India)
- Coordinates: 29.17°N 77.54°E
- Country: India
- State: Uttar Pradesh
- Division: Meerut
- District: Sardhana

Government
  - Body: Chhur Gram Panchayat

Population (2011)
  - Total: 7,566

Languages
  - Official: Hindi
- Time zone: UTC+5:30 (IST)
- PIN: 250342
- Telephone code: +91
- Vehicle registration: UP-15

Chhur (Hindi pronunciation: [छूर]) is a large village located about 30 km (19 mi) north of Meerut, in Meerut district, Uttar Pradesh state, India. Chhur is a village with a population of 7,566, as per the 2011 Census. It is governed by the Chhur Gram Panchayat and falls under the Saroorpur khurd Block Panchayat in Sardhana District. The village comprises 1,219 households and is identified by the village code 118575. Situated in the 250342 postal area, Chhur plays an important role in the rural administration of the Sardhana Sub-District.

== History ==
Chhur is a village with a rich historical background. The people of this village originally migrated from Jasaur Kheri (जैसोर खेड़ी) several centuries ago. They were drawn to this region because of its fertile land, as the area between the Ganga and Yamuna rivers is considered one of the most fertile lands in India.

The migration and settlement were not without challenges. It took two attempts for the migrants to settle in Chhur, as the region was initially occupied by Rajputs. They eventually succeeded in breaking the Chaubeesi (a group of 24 Rajput villages) and established Chhur as the first Jat village in the area.

Following this, other Jats from different gotras began migrating and settling in the Meerut region, contributing to the growth of the Jat community in this part of Uttar Pradesh.

== Population ==
Population Details of Chhur
Particulars	Total	Male	Female
Total Population	7,566	4,214	3,352
Literate Population	5,194	3,237	1,957
Illiterate Population	2,372	977	1,395

== Notable people ==
- Anubhav Choudhary – Indian para-athlete associated with Chhur who won a bronze medal in the men's 100 metres T35 event at the 2026 Asian Para Games.
- Anuj Kumar Taliyan – Indian Army havildar and professional bodybuilder from Chhur. He won gold in the over-100 kg category at the 2019 World Bodybuilding Championships in South Korea and subsequently won international bodybuilding titles.
- Sanjeev Kumar Taliyan – Indian Air Force officer who attained the rank of Air Vice Marshal. A fighter pilot, he commanded No. 22 Squadron and received the Vayu Sena Medal for devotion to duty in 2014.
