= Bhoopgarhi =

- Village
- Nickname: Chaudhary gaon
- Location in Uttar Pradesh, India Bhoopgarhi (India)
- Coordinates: 28.99°N 77.70°E
- Country: India
- State: Uttar Pradesh
- Division: Meerut
- District: Meerut district

Government
  - Body: Gram panchayat
  - gram pradhan: Anil kumar kakkan

Area
  - Total: 1.44 km^{2} (0.56 sq mi)
- Elevation: 219 m (719 ft)

Population (2001)
  - Total: 700
  - Density: 158/km^{2} (410/sq mi)

Languages
  - Official: Hindi
- Time zone: UTC+5:30 (IST)
- PIN: 250501
- Telephone code: 0121
- Vehicle registration: UP-15

Bhoopgarhi is a small village in the Meerut district of Uttar Pradesh, near the Vikas Khand administrative region of Jani Khurd, on the Bagpat road.

The village was established in 1910 by Chaudhary Bhoopat Singh Teotia, who came from Bhatona village in Bulandshahar, West Uttar Pradesh. It is also associated with former prime minister Chaudhary Charan Singh. The population today is around 700, of whom all are Hindus of the Teotia gotra of Jats. The village's present gram pradhan (village leader) is Anil kumar.

The village had a literacy rate of 95.2% in 2009. The villagers are predominantly farmers, and water from the Gaangnehar canal is used as irrigation to sustain sugarcane cultivation in the village.
