= Global Centre for Nuclear Energy Partnership =

World's first nuclear energy partnership centre in India

Global Centre for Nuclear Energy Partnership is the world's first nuclear energy partnership centre at Jasaur Kheri village of Bahadurgarh tehsil in Jhajjar district of Haryana state in India. This centre facilitates deliberation and discussions by international experts on various issues including innovation in nuclear reactors and the nuclear fuel cycle, development of proliferation-resistant reactors, security technologies and the effects of radiation exposure.

== Campus ==
One among six research institutes of the Department of Atomic Energy of Govt of India, this campus is located on 400 acre land in NCR Delhi.

== Schools ==
Five schools are:

- School of Advanced Nuclear Energy System Studies (SANESS
- School of Nuclear Security Studies (SNSS)
- School on Radiological Safety Studies (SRSS)
- School of Nuclear Material Characterization Studies (SNMCS)
- School for Studies on Applications of Radioisotopes and Radiation Technologies (SARRT)

== Courses ==
The institute offers training courses and workshops in various areas through its schools.

== See also ==
- International Solar Alliance
