= Hajipur (Meerut) =

Hajipur is a village in Meerut District in the state of Uttar Pradesh in India. It has a population of about 1461 persons living in around 194 householdshols. Most of the population is Muslim, and belongs mainly to the Muslim Gaddi community, with smaller numbers of Bhishti, Jogi Faqir, Muslim Barhai and Muslim Banjara.
