= Meerut district =

- District of Uttar Pradesh
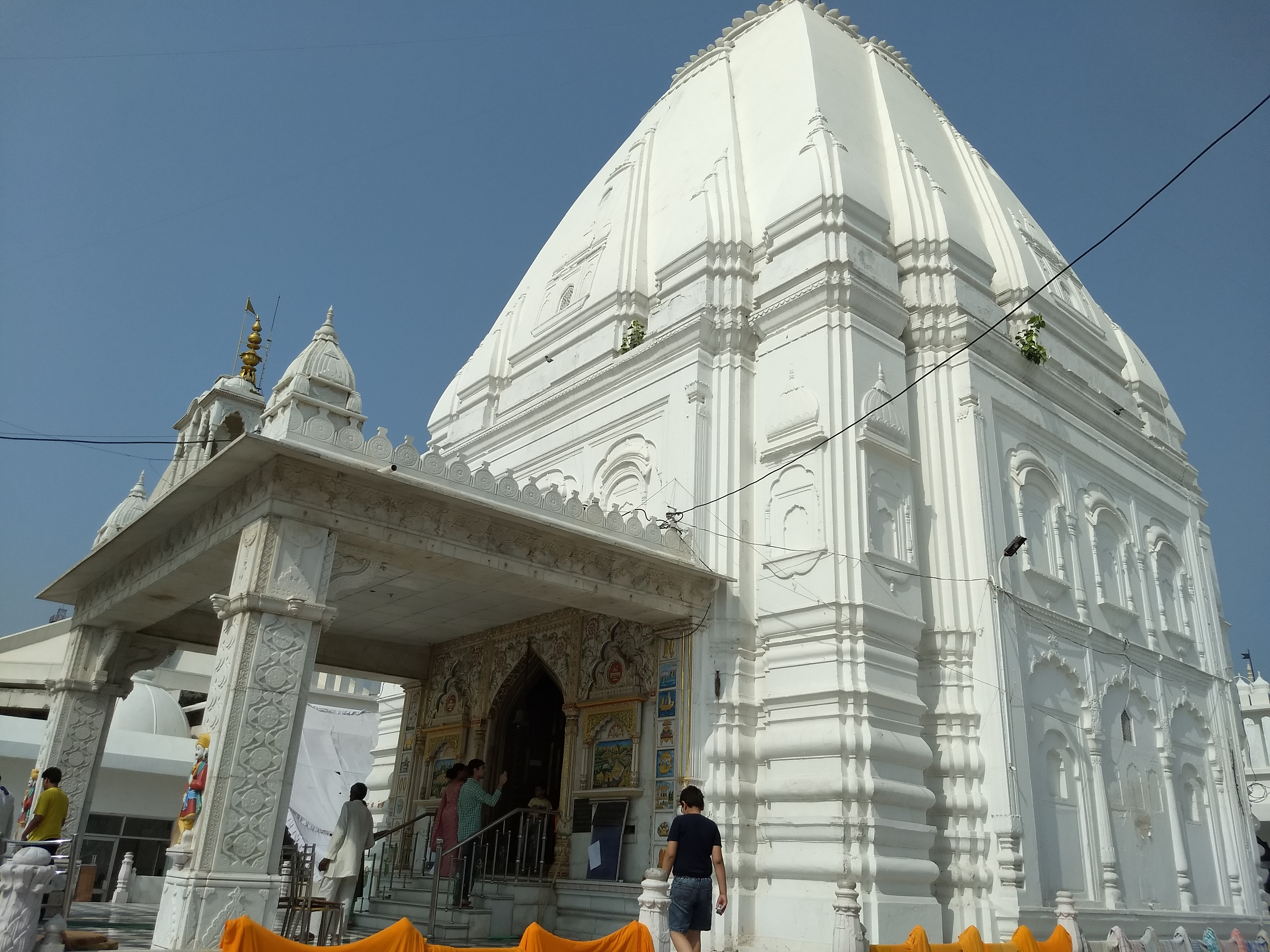
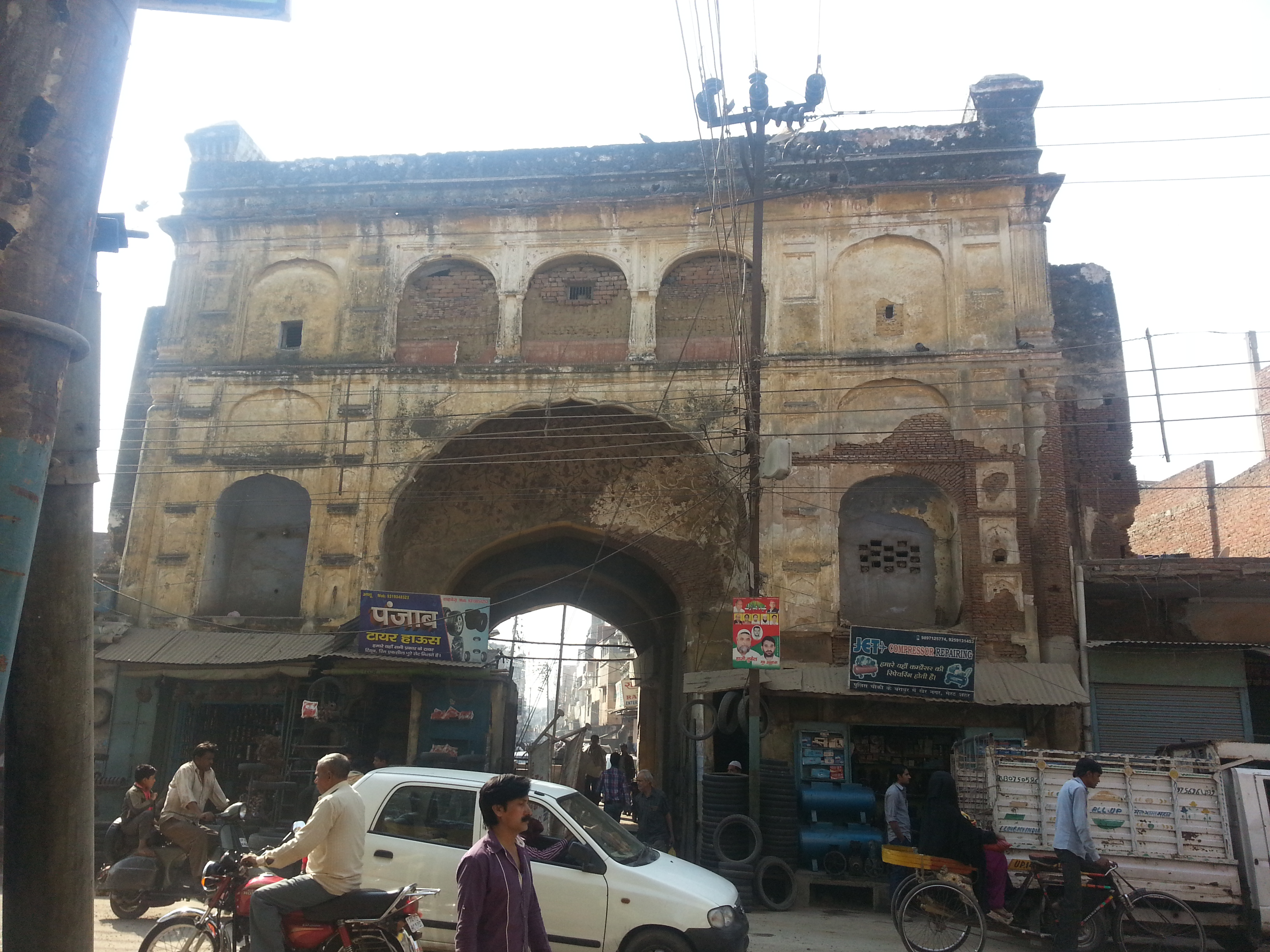
- Top: Jain Pracha Bada Mandir in Hastinapur; Bottom: Khair Nagar Gate in Meerut

- Location of Meerut district in Uttar Pradesh
- Coordinates (Meerut): 28.984°N 77.704°E
- Country: India
- State: Uttar Pradesh
- Division: Meerut division
- Headquarters: Meerut
- Tehsils: 3

Government
  - Lok Sabha constituencies: Meerut
  - Vidhan Sabha constituencies: 7

Area
  - Total: 2,522 km^{2} (974 sq mi)

Population (2011)
  - Total: 3,443,689
  - Density: 1,365/km^{2} (3,537/sq mi)
  - Urban: 51.07 %

Demographics
  - Literacy: 84.80 %
  - Sex ratio: 885
- Time zone: UTC+05:30 (IST)
- Major highways: NH-58, NE-3
- Website: http://meerut.nic.in/

Meerut district (Hindi pronunciation: [meːɾəʈʰ]) is one of the districts of the Indian state of Uttar Pradesh, and a part of Delhi, with the city of Meerut as the district headquarters. Meerut District is also a part of the Meerut Division. The administrative head of district of Meerut is a District Magistrate while the administrative head of Meerut Division is Divisional Commissioner, an IAS officer.

== History ==
The district was established under British rule in 1818, constituting the then tehsils of Meerut, Ghaziabad, Mawana, Baghpat, Sardhana and Hapur. These now form the districts of Meerut, Ghaziabad, Hapur, Bagpat, Muzaffarnagar, Bulandshahr and a part of Gautam Buddh Nagar district.

== Geography ==
Meerut District lies between 28°57’N to 29°02’N and 77°40’E to 77°45’E in the Indo-Gangetic plains of India. It is bound on the north by Muzaffarnagar District and in the south by Bulandshahar District, while Ghaziabad District and Baghpat District form the southern and western borders. The River Ganges forms the eastern boundary and separates the district from Moradabad District and Bijnor District, while the Hindon forms the western boundary and separates the district from Baghpat. The ground is not rocky and there are no mountains. The soil is composed of pleistocene and sub-recent alluvial sediments transported and deposited by the river, whose source is from the Himalayas. These alluvial deposits are unconsolidated. Lithologically, sediments consist of clay, silt and fine to coarse sand. Land is very fertile for growing crops, especially wheat, sugarcane and vegetables.

== Administration ==
The administrative head of district of Meerut is a District Magistrate while the administrative head of Meerut Division is Divisional Commissioner, an IAS officer.

=== Tehsils ===
The District administration comprises three tehsils, namely:

- Meerut
- Mawana
- Sardhana

=== Blocks ===
Meerut District is divided into 12 blocks, namely:

- Meerut
- Rajpura
- Kharkhauda
- Jani
- Rohata
- Mawana
- Parikshitgarh
- Machhara
- Hastinapur
- Sardhana
- Daurala
- Saroorpur

== Politics ==
Meerut is in part served by the Meerut-Hapur constituency for elections to the Lok Sabha of the Parliament of India.

As of 25 January 2017, the district has seven Vidhan Sabha (Legislative Assembly) constituencies, which return members of the Legislative Assembly of Uttar Pradesh. These are Siwalkhas, Sardhana, Hastinapur (which is reserved for candidates from the Scheduled Castes), Kithore, Meerut Cantonment, Meerut, and Meerut South.

== Demographics ==
Historical population
Year	Pop.	±% p.a.
1901	675,150	—
1911	666,027	−0.14%
1921	663,961	−0.03%
1931	709,677	+0.67%
1941	840,218	+1.70%
1951	1,010,618	+1.86%
1961	1,201,058	+1.74%
1971	1,492,928	+2.20%
1981	1,897,593	+2.43%
1991	2,397,099	+2.36%
2001	2,973,877	+2.18%
2011	3,443,689	+1.48%

According to the 2011 census, Meerut District has a population of 3,443,689, roughly equal to the nation of Panama, ranking 94th in India. The district has a population density of 1,346 inhabitants per square kilometre (3,490/sq mi). Its population growth rate as recorded over the decade 2001-2011 was 1.489%. Meerut has a sex ratio of 886 females for every 1000 males, lower than the state average of 908; while the child sex ratio is 852, lower than the state average of 899. The district has a literacy rate of 84%, higher than the state average of 67.68%. 51% of the population lives in urban areas. Scheduled Castes made up 18.12% of the population.

According to the 2011 census, the district ranked 6th in terms of population density in Uttar Pradesh. The district had an average literacy rate of 83.96%, higher than the national average of 78.8% and the state average of 67.36%. 16.66% of the population was under 6 years of age. The percentage of Muslim population was over 36%, one of the largest within India.

At the time of the 2011 Census of India, 86.55% of the population of the district spoke Hindi, 12.43% Urdu and 0.47% Punjabi as their first language.

=== Area-based data ===
Demographics of Meerut District (2011 Census)
Tehsil	Town/Village (Note: M Corp. = Municipal Corporation, NP = Nagar panchayat, NPP = Nagar Palika Parishad, CB = Cantonment Board, CT = Census Town)	==== Population ====			==== Sex Ratio ====	==== Literacy Rate ==== (Note: For Literacy rate, population aged 7 and above only is considered in India.)		
Tehsil	Town/Village	Male	Female	Total	==== Sex Ratio ====	Male	Female	Total
Meerut	Kharkhoda (NP)	7584	6780	14,364	894	95.68%	77.51%	86.99%
Meerut	Sewalkhas (NP)	13073	11809	24,882	903	76.52%	55.94%	66.74%
Meerut	Meerut (CB)	53024	40288	93,312	760	97.99%	89.48%	94.33%
Meerut	Meerut (M Corp.)	688118	617311	1,305,429	897	80.97%	69.79%	75.66%
Meerut	Mohiuddinpur (CT)	2811	2389	5,200	850	89.17%	69.63%	80.13%
Meerut	Aminagar Urf Bhurbaral (CT)	3314	2827	6,141	853	91.01%	69.68%	81.02%
Meerut	Amehra Adipur (CT)	2844	2641	5,485	929	85.68%	68.05%	77.14%
Meerut	Sindhawali (CT)	2782	2553	5,335	918	79.92%	64.44%	72.53%
Meerut	Tehsil Meerut Total	2114701	1887456	4,102,157	886	91.54%	77.26%	84.81%
Mawana	Kithaur (NP)	14488	13445	27,933	928	79.85%	61.71%	71.11%
Mawana	Parikshitgarh (NP)	10385	9445	19,830	909	87.83%	70.92%	79.73%
Mawana	Mawana (NPP)	43029	38414	81,443	893	77.81%	62.49%	70.55%
Mawana	Hastinapur (NP)	14010	12442	26,452	888	82.50%	63.47%	73.48%
Mawana	Bahsuma (NP)	6307	5446	11,753	863	84.14%	66.12%	75.70%
Mawana	Phalauda (NP)	10423	9485	19,908	910	71.54%	51.01%	61.79%
Mawana	Tehsil Mawana Total	409829	362612	772,441	885	90.30%	69.27%	80.40%
Sardhana	Lawar (NP)	11599	10425	22,024	899	69.82%	47.92%	59.37%
Sardhana	Daurala (NP)	10565	9211	19,776	872	87.64%	69.71%	79.23%
Sardhana	Sardhana (NPP)	30171	28081	58,252	931	70.96%	54.88%	63.18%
Sardhana	Karnawal (NP)	6296	5367	11,663	852	86.81%	66.50%	77.36%
Sardhana	Tehsil Sardhana Total	301213	267878	569,091	889	78.34%	58.05%	68.74%
District - Meerut Total		1,825,743	1,617,946	3,443,689	886	90.74%	73.98%	82.84%

Population Statistics
Year	Urban			Rural			Total			Growth rate	Sex ratio (Note: In females per 1000 males)	Density (Note: In persons per square kilometer)
Year	Male	Female	Total	Male	Female	Total	Male	Female	Total	Growth rate	Sex ratio	Density
1971 (Note: Includes Ghaziabad and Gautam Buddh Nagar districts) (Note: Includes Bagpat district)	NA	NA	817,445	NA	NA	2,546,204	NA	NA	3,363,649	24.04%	830	563
1981	NA	NA	863,280	NA	NA	1,903,280	NA	NA	2,767,246	28.43% (Note: Ghaziabad district (including parts of Gautam Buddh Nagar district) was separated from Meerut district in 1976. Baghpat district was separated in 1998. Growth rates in the 1971-1981 and 1991-2001 periods exclude the populations of these districts.)	841 (+11)	708 (+145)
1991 (Note: Does not include Bagpat district)	NA	NA	849,799	NA	NA	1,567,714	1,301,137 (53.82%)	1,116,376 (46.18%)	2,417,513	24.91%	858 (+17)	959 (+251)
2001	774,670	677,313	1,451,983	826,908	718,470	1,545,378	1,601,578 (53.43%)	1,395,783 (46.56%)	2,997,361	24.16%	871 (+13)	1190 (+231)
2011	932,736	829,837	1,762,573	896,456	788,376	1,684,832	1,829,192 (53.06%)	1,618,213 (46.94%)	3,443,689	15.92%	885 (+14)	1347 (+157)

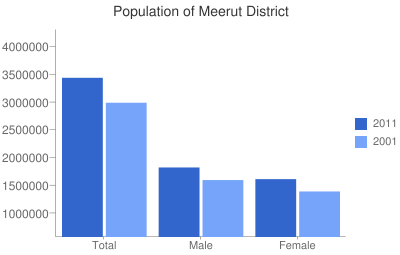
Change in the population of Meerut, 2001–2011

Literacy Rate (Percentage)
Year	Male	Female	Total
1991 (Note: Does not include Bagpat district)	64.88	37.67	52.41
2001	76.31 (+11.43)	54.12 (+16.45)	65.96 (+13.55)
2011	92.91 (+16.6)	75.69 (+21.57)	84.80 (+18.84)

=== Religion ===
Religions in Meerut district (2011)
Religion	Percent
Hinduism	63.40%
Islam	34.43%
Sikhism	0.72%
Jainism	0.54%
Other or not stated	0.91%
Distribution of religions

Hindus are the majority belief in the district, although Muslims are a significant minority. There are also additional minorities of Sikhs, Jains and Christians in the district.

Religious rifts are present within the district between Hindus and Muslims, the 1987 Meerut communal riots and 2014 Meerut riots having taken place here.

The Roman Catholic Diocese of Meerut serves this district.

== Areas ==
=== Cities ===
- Meerut

=== Towns ===
- Bahsuma
- Daurala
- Hastinapur
- Karnawal
- Kharkhoda
- Kithaur
- Lawar
- Mawana
- Mohiuddinpur
- Parikshitgarh
- Partapur
- Phalauda
- Sardhana
- Sewalkhas

=== Villages ===
- Chhur
- Samaypur
- Bhatipura
- Ajrara
- Alamgirpur
- Bhoopgarhi
- Bhopgarh
- Meerpur
- Fatehapur Narayan
- Hajipur
- Harra
- Incholi
- Khiwai
- Kaland
- Machhra
- Niloha
- Pabarsa
- Palra
- Shahjahanpur
