= Mawana =

- City
- Nickname: Muhana
- Location in Uttar Pradesh, India Mawana (India)
- Coordinates: 29.10°N 77.92°E
- Country: India
- State: Uttar Pradesh
- District: Meerut
- Elevation: 221 m (725 ft)

Population (2011)
  - Total: 81,443

Language
  - Official: Hindi
  - Additional official: Urdu
- Time zone: UTC+5:30 (IST)
- PIN: 250401
- Telephone code: 01233
- Sex ratio: 1000:893♂/♀

Mawana is a city in Meerut district in the Uttar Pradesh state of India. It is 26 km from the district headquarters Meerut. Its name comes from the word "Muhana" which means gateway. It is supposed to be the Muhana of Hastinapur kingdom. Hastinapur is a Mahabharata period town situated 9 km from the city center.

== Geography ==
The river Ganga is 10 km from Mawana. NH-34 joints Meerut to Mawana then Mawana to Bijnor.

== History ==
During the Mughal period, the town came under the sway of the Barha Dynasty nobility when descendants of Akbar's general and Governor of Patan, Gujrat , Qasim Khan Barha settled in Mawana Kalan and controlled a Jagir of 21 surrounding villages and retained their influence somewhat till the Indian Partition . Later, during the 1857 Indian Rebellion, the region became a key center of resistance led by Rao Qadam Singh Gujjar. Declared Raja by local revolutionaries across the Mawana, Parikshitgarh, and Bahsuma belt, Qadam Singh organized thousands of fighters, cut off British supply lines, and besieged the Mawana tehsil before British forces eventually suppressed the uprising .

== Administration ==
Mawana is a Nagar Palika Parishad city in district of Meerut, Uttar Pradesh (India). Mawana city is divided into 25 wards for which elections are held every five years.

== Demographics ==
As of 2011 Indian Census, Mawana had a total population of 81,443, of which 43,029 were males and 38,414 were females. Population within the age group of 0 to 6 years was 11,426. The total number of literates in Mawana was 49,395, which constituted 60.6% of the population with male literacy of 66.6% and female literacy of 54.0%. The effective literacy rate of 7+ population of Mawana was 70.6%, of which male literacy rate was 77.8% and female literacy rate was 62.5%. The Scheduled Castes and Scheduled Tribes population was 8,347 and 48 respectively. Mawana had 13566 households in 2011.

== Work profile ==
Out of the total population, 23,562 were engaged in work or business activity. Of this 20,728 were male while 2,834 were female. In the census survey, a worker is defined as person who does business, job, service, and cultivator and labour activity. Of the total 23,562 working population, 84.02% were engaged in main work while 15.98% of the total workers were engaged in marginal work.

== Healthcare ==
- Community Health Centre (CHC), Mawana

== Schools ==
- Primary School No. 1, Tehsil Road, Mawana
- Primary School No. 3, Pritnagar, Mawana
- Girls Upper Primary School, Tehsil Road, Mawana
- Upper Primary School, Tehsil Road, Mawana

== Banking ==
- State Bank of India — Mawana branch

== Festivals and fairs ==
Mawana hosts an annual fair named Shaheed Chadrabhan Pradarshani. The founder of Shaheed Chandrabhan Samiti is R. Singh (ret. DSP and freedom fighter). Mela Makhdumpur is famous for Ganga-Snan festival.

=== Nagar Palika Ground ===
Mawana Nagar Palika Ground is a public ground in the city that is used for sporting activities and hosts a weekly market every Sunday. In 2023, the municipal administration proposed developing the ground as a mini stadium.

== Notable people ==
- Amar Pal Singh – Former Member of Parliament, Meerut

== Mawana tehsil - Meerut ==
This is a list of all towns and villages in Mawana Tehsil of Meerut district, Uttar Pradesh.

| # | Town | State | Population |
|---|---|---|---|
| 1 | Mawana Nagar Palika Parishad | Uttar Pradesh | 81,443 |
| 2 | Kithaur Nagar Panchayat | Uttar Pradesh | 27,933 |
| 3 | Hastinapur Nagar Panchayat | Uttar Pradesh | 26,452 |
| 4 | Phalauda Nagar Panchayat | Uttar Pradesh | 19,908 |
| 5 | Parikshitgarh Nagar Panchayat | Uttar Pradesh | 19,830 |
| 6 | Bahsuma Nagar Panchayat | Uttar Pradesh | 11,753 |

| # | Villages | Administrative division | Population |
|---|---|---|---|
| 1 | Achi Khurd | Mawana | 2,630 |
| 2 | Achikalan | Mawana | 1,342 |
| 3 | Afjalpur Urf Raninagla | Mawana | 2,825 |
| 4 | Agwanpur | Mawana | 11,353 |
| 5 | Ahmadnagar Badhla | Mawana | 1,507 |
| 6 | Ahmadpur Urf Dandoopur | Mawana | 2,098 |
| 7 | Ahmadpuri Urf Amanpuri | Mawana | 2,136 |
| 8 | Aidalpur | Mawana | 8 |
| 9 | Aidalpur | Mawana | 578 |
| 10 | Akbarpur Garhi | Mawana | 3,028 |
| 11 | Akbarpur Ichchhabad | Mawana | 462 |
| 12 | Akbarpur Sadat | Mawana | 4,496 |
| 13 | Akheypur | Mawana | 179 |
| 14 | Alamgirpur Badhla | Mawana | 4,076 |
| 15 | Alipur Alampur | Mawana | 1,551 |
| 16 | Alipur Morna | Mawana | 2,577 |
| 17 | Amarpur Mazra Khandawli | Mawana | 2,373 |
| 18 | Amarsinghpur | Mawana | 2,559 |
| 19 | Ameharasani | Mawana | 703 |
| 20 | Aminabad Urf Baragoan | Mawana | 2,347 |
| 21 | Amroli Urf Baragoan | Mawana | 4,597 |
| 22 | Asfabad | Mawana | 1,674 |
| 23 | Asilpur | Mawana | 5,179 |
| 24 | Askaripur | Mawana | 288 |
| 25 | Assa | Mawana | 3,396 |
| 26 | Atalpur | Mawana | 1,608 |
| 27 | Atmadpur | Mawana | 2,358 |
| 28 | Attaura | Mawana | 2,445 |
| 29 | Badhwa | Mawana | 184 |
| 30 | Badhwi | Mawana | 100 |
| 31 | Baghpur | Mawana | 84 |
| 32 | Bahadurpur | Mawana | 2,777 |
| 33 | Bahorpur | Mawana | 2,962 |
| 34 | Bajampur | Mawana | 1,632 |
| 35 | Bali | Mawana | 2,922 |
| 36 | Bamnaula | Mawana | 3 |
| 37 | Bamnauli | Mawana | 466 |
| 38 | Bana | Mawana | 3,324 |
| 39 | Barauda | Mawana | 245 |
| 40 | Basiviran | Mawana | 7 |
| 41 | Bastora Norang | Mawana | 2,107 |
| 42 | Batawli | Mawana | 2,429 |
| 43 | Batnor | Mawana | 5,477 |
| 44 | Behbalpur | Mawana | 13 |
| 45 | Behjadka | Mawana | 1,452 |
| 46 | Behlolpur | Mawana | 2,137 |
| 47 | Behrora | Mawana | 5,279 |
| 48 | Behsuma | Mawana | 50 |
| 49 | Bhagawanpur | Mawana | 2,301 |
| 50 | Bhagupur | Mawana | 282 |
| 51 | Bhagwanpur Bangar | Mawana | 1,233 |
| 52 | Bhagwanpur Khadar | Mawana | 161 |
| 53 | Bhainsa | Mawana | 7,391 |
| 54 | Bharolli | Mawana | 1,833 |
| 55 | Bhattipura | Mawana | 6,626 |
| 56 | Bhirwara | Mawana | 1,436 |
| 57 | Bhndora | Mawana | 1,103 |
| 58 | Bisola | Mawana | 4,909 |
| 59 | Bondra | Mawana | 2,727 |
| 60 | Chamraud | Mawana | 651 |
| 61 | Chandlawar Urf Mahalwala | Mawana | 4,645 |
| 62 | Chhuchai | Mawana | 3,159 |
| 63 | Chitwana Sherpur | Mawana | 2,959 |
| 64 | Dabkheri | Mawana | 419 |
| 65 | Dabthla | Mawana | 2,546 |
| 66 | Dariapur | Mawana | 1,253 |
| 67 | Daulatpur Urf Mamipur | Mawana | 1,042 |
| 68 | Dayalpur | Mawana | 924 |
| 69 | Dayalpur | Mawana | 1,768 |
| 70 | Dedupur | Mawana | 1,161 |
| 71 | Dhanpura | Mawana | 2,365 |
| 72 | Dhanpura | Mawana | 1,468 |
| 73 | Dhuma Nagli | Mawana | 703 |
| 74 | Dudheli Bangar | Mawana | 447 |
| 75 | Dudhli Khadar | Mawana | 778 |
| 76 | Duperi Chaw | Mawana | 71 |
| 77 | Durveshpur | Mawana | 3,527 |
| 78 | Fajilpur | Mawana | 370 |
| 79 | Fatehpur Narain | Mawana | 3,442 |
| 80 | Fatehpur Prem | Mawana | 221 |
| 81 | Firozpur | Mawana | 42 |
| 82 | Ftahpur Hansapur | Mawana | 547 |
| 83 | Gagsona | Mawana | 2,406 |
| 84 | Gajraula | Mawana | 1,754 |
| 85 | Gajrauli | Mawana | 657 |
| 86 | Gajupura | Mawana | 150 |
| 87 | Ganeshpur | Mawana | 4,820 |
| 88 | Garina | Mawana | 4,068 |
| 89 | Gayanagla Urf Nagla Katar | Mawana | 1,046 |
| 90 | Gazipur | Mawana | 1,984 |
| 91 | Gesupur Januvi | Mawana | 2,118 |
| 92 | Gesupur Shumali | Mawana | 2,165 |
| 93 | Gokulpur | Mawana | 5 |
| 94 | Govindpur Sakarpur | Mawana | 2,971 |
| 95 | Govindpuri | Mawana | 2,556 |
| 96 | Guramb | Mawana | 623 |
| 97 | Gurha | Mawana | 2,179 |
| 98 | Hadipur Gaori | Mawana | 139 |
| 99 | Haripur | Mawana | 219 |
| 100 | Hasanpur Kalan | Mawana | 4,591 |
| 101 | Hastinapur Kaurwan | Mawana | 35 |
| 102 | Hastinapur Pandwan | Mawana | 726 |
| 103 | Hatoopura | Mawana | 639 |
| 104 | Himaupur | Mawana | 1,519 |
| 105 | Ikwara | Mawana | 1,951 |
| 106 | Issapur | Mawana | 677 |
| 107 | Jai | Mawana | 7,375 |
| 108 | Jaisinghpur | Mawana | 2,226 |
| 109 | Jalalpur Jora | Mawana | 480 |
| 110 | Jalalpur Maqbulpur | Mawana | 620 |
| 111 | Jalalpur Raunakali | Mawana | 5 |
| 112 | Jandheri | Mawana | 2,616 |
| 113 | Jarauda | Mawana | 4,299 |
| 114 | Jataula | Mawana | 1,643 |
| 115 | Jharaka | Mawana | 733 |
| 116 | Jhijharpur | Mawana | 1,584 |
| 117 | Jhunjhunee | Mawana | 2,717 |
| 118 | Kailirampur | Mawana | 2,351 |
| 119 | Kanker Khera | Mawana | 1,356 |
| 120 | Kareempur | Mawana | 1,608 |
| 121 | Kasimpur | Mawana | 2,839 |
| 122 | Katra | Mawana | 10 |
| 123 | Kayasth Barha | Mawana | 9,358 |
| 124 | Khaikhera | Mawana | 1,448 |
| 125 | Khalidpur | Mawana | 1,707 |
| 126 | Khand Awli | Mawana | 2,699 |
| 127 | Khanpur Banger | Mawana | 3,623 |
| 128 | Khanpur Garhi | Mawana | 996 |
| 129 | Kharkhali | Mawana | 252 |
| 130 | Khata | Mawana | 3,020 |
| 131 | Khatki | Mawana | 3,722 |
| 132 | Khejuri Alyarpur | Mawana | 7,427 |
| 133 | Kheri Kalan | Mawana | 706 |
| 134 | Kheri Manihar | Mawana | 3,245 |
| 135 | Kherki Jadid | Mawana | 1,687 |
| 136 | Khorrai | Mawana | 1,335 |
| 137 | Kishanpur | Mawana | 184 |
| 138 | Kishanpur Birana | Mawana | 2,480 |
| 139 | Kishorpur | Mawana | 1,005 |
| 140 | Kithor Rural | Mawana | 2,928 |
| 141 | Kohla | Mawana | 1,513 |
| 142 | Kol | Mawana | 2,465 |
| 143 | Kunda | Mawana | 1,295 |
| 144 | Kunehra | Mawana | 1,352 |
| 145 | Kuri Kamalpur | Mawana | 1,577 |
| 146 | Kutubpur | Mawana | 8 |
| 147 | Laliyana | Mawana | 11,372 |
| 148 | Lalpur | Mawana | 1,083 |
| 149 | Latifpur | Mawana | 2,478 |
| 150 | Lutfullapur Baksar | Mawana | 1,608 |
| 151 | Machhra | Mawana | 3,394 |
| 152 | Mahamudpur Shikhera | Mawana | 1,849 |
| 153 | Mahmudabad | Mawana | 217 |
| 154 | Mahmudpur Garvi | Mawana | 851 |
| 155 | Mahmudpur Sherki | Mawana | 1,118 |
| 156 | Makhannagar | Mawana | 2,804 |
| 157 | Mamipur | Mawana | 879 |
| 158 | Mandwari | Mawana | 1,944 |
| 159 | Manpur | Mawana | 534 |
| 160 | Manpur | Mawana | 2,408 |
| 161 | Matora | Mawana | 2,989 |
| 162 | Mavi | Mawana | 1,313 |
| 163 | Mawana Kalan | Mawana | 57 |
| 164 | Mawana Khurd | Mawana | 6,399 |
| 165 | Meerpur | Mawana | 708 |
| 166 | Meerpur Sadhunagal | Mawana | 378 |
| 167 | Meghrajpur | Mawana | 2,190 |
| 168 | Mewa | Mawana | 5,002 |
| 169 | Mirzapur | Mawana | 490 |
| 170 | Mishipur | Mawana | 689 |
| 171 | Mohammadpur Kheri | Mawana | 124 |
| 172 | Mohammadpur Shakist | Mawana | 1,717 |
| 173 | Mor Kalan | Mawana | 1,522 |
| 174 | Morkhurd | Mawana | 3,847 |
| 175 | Mubarikpur | Mawana | 2,261 |
| 176 | Mubarikpur | Mawana | 2,920 |
| 177 | Murad Gaon Urf Kuwan Khera | Mawana | 595 |
| 178 | Muradpur Urf Sholda | Mawana | 3,422 |
| 179 | Muzaffarpur Khunti | Mawana | 389 |
| 180 | Nagla Azdi | Mawana | 1,120 |
| 181 | Nagla Chand | Mawana | 1,209 |
| 182 | Nagla Gusai | Mawana | 3,155 |
| 183 | Nagla Hareroo | Mawana | 3,763 |
| 184 | Nagla Salempur | Mawana | 607 |
| 185 | Nagla Shahu | Mawana | 6,436 |
| 186 | Nagli Abdulla | Mawana | 1,241 |
| 187 | Nagli Issa | Mawana | 1,517 |
| 188 | Nagli Khadar | Mawana | 742 |
| 189 | Nagli Kithaur | Mawana | 3,262 |
| 190 | Nagori | Mawana | 1,664 |
| 191 | Nai Putha | Mawana | 112 |
| 192 | Naidru | Mawana | 2,926 |
| 193 | Narangpur | Mawana | 4,255 |
| 194 | Nasarpur | Mawana | 2,154 |
| 195 | Navipur Amanatnagar | Mawana | 1,222 |
| 196 | Nawal Surajpur | Mawana | 2,060 |
| 197 | Neemka | Mawana | 1,868 |
| 198 | Niloha | Mawana | 5,602 |
| 199 | Nirawali | Mawana | 1,589 |
| 200 | Nityanandpur | Mawana | 2,436 |
| 201 | Paharpur | Mawana | 1,685 |
| 202 | Paharpur Kutub | Mawana | 23 |
| 203 | Pali | Mawana | 2,115 |
| 204 | Palra | Mawana | 2,334 |
| 205 | Paricchatgarh | Mawana | 3,296 |
| 206 | Partapur Hansapur | Mawana | 160 |
| 207 | Paswara | Mawana | 3,544 |
| 208 | Penai | Mawana | 354 |
| 209 | Phalawda Rural | Mawana | 328 |
| 210 | Phitkari | Mawana | 4,343 |
| 211 | Pilona | Mawana | 2,040 |
| 212 | Poothi | Mawana | 7,188 |
| 213 | Rachhoti | Mawana | 7,662 |
| 214 | Radhna Inayatpur | Mawana | 10,835 |
| 215 | Rafan | Mawana | 1,355 |
| 216 | Rahawati | Mawana | 2,802 |
| 217 | Rahmapur | Mawana | 2,367 |
| 218 | Rampur Ghoria | Mawana | 1,074 |
| 219 | Rampur Sadhu Nagli | Mawana | 902 |
| 220 | Rasulpur Goari | Mawana | 2,150 |
| 221 | Rasulpur Ikla | Mawana | 4,401 |
| 222 | Rathaura Khurd | Mawana | 1,192 |
| 223 | Rathora Kalan | Mawana | 513 |
| 224 | Rehadra | Mawana | 1,737 |
| 225 | Roopra | Mawana | 4 |
| 226 | Rustampur Bhikund | Mawana | 459 |
| 227 | Sadarpur | Mawana | 1,905 |
| 228 | Sadullapur | Mawana | 107 |
| 229 | Sadullapur | Mawana | 1,249 |
| 230 | Saidipur Sadipur Urf Ramnagar | Mawana | 2,353 |
| 231 | Saidipur Seth | Mawana | 852 |
| 232 | Saifpur Firojpur | Mawana | 13,828 |
| 233 | Saifpur Karamchandpur | Mawana | 4,038 |
| 234 | Sakoti | Mawana | 2,318 |
| 235 | Salah Rasulpur Panah | Mawana | 883 |
| 236 | Sandhan | Mawana | 2,815 |
| 237 | Sanota | Mawana | 4,016 |
| 238 | Sarai Khadar | Mawana | 876 |
| 239 | Sarangpur | Mawana | 1,406 |
| 240 | Sathla | Mawana | 7,555 |
| 241 | Seena | Mawana | 3,426 |
| 242 | Shah Kulipur | Mawana | 1,486 |
| 243 | Shahabad Garhi | Mawana | 26 |
| 244 | Shahajhapur | Mawana | 17,066 |
| 245 | Shahapur | Mawana | 2,957 |
| 246 | Shahipur | Mawana | 402 |
| 247 | Shahpur Sultanpur | Mawana | 195 |
| 248 | Shahzadpur | Mawana | 943 |
| 249 | Shamashpur | Mawana | 1,949 |
| 250 | Shamaspur | Mawana | 1,409 |
| 251 | Sherpur | Mawana | 11 |
| 252 | Shikhera | Mawana | 2,202 |
| 253 | Shirjepur | Mawana | 473 |
| 254 | Shivpuri | Mawana | 1,082 |
| 255 | Shodatt | Mawana | 7,453 |
| 256 | Sikandarpur | Mawana | 641 |
| 257 | Singhpur | Mawana | 1,078 |
| 258 | Sona | Mawana | 1,929 |
| 259 | Sujatpur | Mawana | 296 |
| 260 | Sultanpur Dabal | Mawana | 153 |
| 261 | Tajpura | Mawana | 1,284 |
| 262 | Takhawali | Mawana | 1,632 |
| 263 | Tarapur | Mawana | 2,118 |
| 264 | Tarbiyatpur Janubi | Mawana | 1,627 |
| 265 | Tarbiyatpur Shumali | Mawana | 409 |
| 266 | Tatina | Mawana | 2,159 |
| 267 | Tigri | Mawana | 2,397 |
| 268 | Tofapur | Mawana | 3,739 |
