= Pabarsa =

Village in Uttar Pradesh, India

Pabarsa, also known as Baparsa or Pawarsa, is a sub-urban village in Meerut district, Uttar Pradesh, India, near Sardar Vallabh Bhai Patel Agriculture & Technology University, Modipuram (Meerut) having population of 2500 inhabitants. It is located at approximation of 750 meters from Main University Campus. Urban centre (Modipuram) of Meerut metropolitan city & Daurala nagar panchayat of Meerut district are very near to village approx 3.5 Kilometres in south east & north east directions respectively.

It is 2.8 kilometres (1.7 mi) away from National Highway 58, popularly known as Delhi Dehradun highway. It is also very close to under construction "Modipuram depot station" of Delhi Meerut RRTS ( Rapid metro). Agriculture is main occupations of villagers, especially farming of Sugar cane, Wheat, Rice & Potato. Village population have dominance of Jat community (Panwar & Puniya gotra) along with other caste Saini, Dalit, Prjapati, Gadaria, Kahaar, Balmiki & other Hindu castes in low proportions. Jat-Panwars here are the descendants of Royal maulaheri Panwar Dynasty.
