= Jasaur Kheri =

- Village
- Location in Haryana, India Jasaur Kheri (India)
- Coordinates: 28.78°N 76.86°E
- Country: India
- State: Haryana
- District: Jhajjar
- Tehsil: Bahadurgarh
- Elevation: 207 m (679 ft)

Languages
  - Official: Haryanvi, Hindi
- Time zone: UTC+5:30 (IST)
- PIN: 124535
- Telephone code: 01276
- Vidhan Sabha constituency: Bahadurgarh
- Civic agency: Village Panchayat

Jasaur Kheri is a large village located near Bahadurgarh city in the Jhajjar District of the Indian state of Haryana. It is located on Asaudha - Kharkhoda road. It is about 15 kilometres (9 mi) from nearest city Bahadurgarh and about 36 km from Jhajjar town, the district headquarter.

== Atomic Research Centre ==
Government of India has established a Global Centre for Nuclear Energy Partnership in the village in about 400 acres (160 ha) of land. This is the 6th research and development unit under the aegis of the Department of Atomic Energy. In the future this centre will have direct connectivity to New Delhi Airport and will play a pivotal role in atomic energy research and development.

== Local attractions ==
The village is notable for its ancient Mata Chandraghanta (Chorasi Ghanto wali) Devi temple. On side of temple there is Harshringi lake. There is a hospital and water treatment plant established by the Government of Haryana. It is 40 km (25 mi) from the national capital New Delhi and can be reached by both train or road.

== Transport ==
=== Expressways ===
The six-lane Western Peripheral Expressway passes through Jasaur Kheri village. Western Peripheral Expressway is also known as Kundli-Manesar-Palwal Expressway. The starting point of Delhi–Amritsar–Katra Expressway is also in Jasaur Kheri village. The Detailed Project Report (DPR) of 20 km Link Expressway from Jasaur Kheri to Rohini, Delhi is under process.

=== Connectivity ===
The nearest Railway Station is Asauda (6 km (3.7 mi)). Limited State Transport is available for Bahadurgarh and Sonepat.

== See also ==
- Bahadurgarh
- Rohtak
- Kundli
- Jhajjar
