= Machhra =

- Village
- Interactive map of Machhra
- Country: India
- State: Uttar Pradesh
- District: Meerut district

Population (2011)
  - Total: 3,394
- Postal Index Number: 250106

Machhra is a village situated in Meerut district, Uttar Pradesh state of India.
