= Nauchandi Mela =

Annual fair in Meerut, India

Nauchandi Mela नवचण्डिका मेला
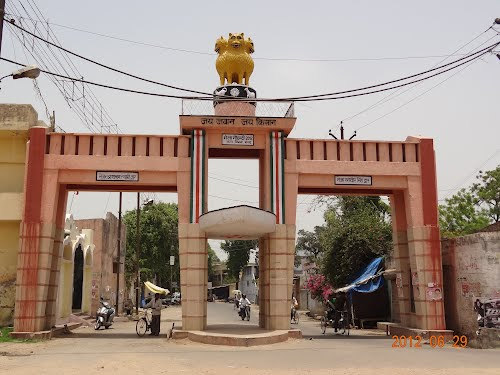
- Nauchandi Gate, Meerut
- Status: active
- Genre: fairs
- Dates: Vikram Samwat, Chaitra Navratri
- Begins: Chaitra month Krishna Pratipada
- Ends: Chaitra Poornamasi
- Frequency: Annually
- Venue: Nauchandi Ground
- Locations: Garh Road, Meerut
- Coordinates: 28.9667126°N 77.7173716°E
- Country: India
- Inaugurated: Vikram Samwat Chaitra Navratri to worship Prachin Shri Chandi Devi Mata, old temple situated at the beginning of the ground.
- Founder: Prachin Shri Chandi Devi Mata
- Organiser: Meerut Nagar Nigam

The Nauchandi Mela is an annual fair held at Nauchandi Ground in Meerut. The fair stretches for about a month and is organized by the Municipal Corporation of Meerut. It generally starts from the second Sunday after Holi. The fair is held to worship goddess Chandi during Chaitra Navratri. Prachin Shri Chandi Devi mandir is situated at the beginning of the ground opposite Bale Miyan Mazaar. People from across the nation and abroad visits the old Prachin Shri Chandi Devi Mandir and gets blessings for children and family. The main exhibits are the artistic and religious rituals followed in rustic Uttar Pradesh. The fair witness more than 50,000 visitors every year. The Indian Railways' Nauchandi Express train is named after this fair from Meerut to the state capital Lucknow.

== History ==
The fair has a prominent history dating back several hundred years. It is said to have started with the start of Vikram Samwat as a 3-Day Navratri fair held on Saptami Ashtami and Ram Nawami in Chaitra Month.The name Nauchandi (Nav-Chandi : means 9 forms of goddess) was derived from an ancient temple of Goddess Chandi which is situated in the ground as Pracheen Shri Chandi Devi Mandir. It is said that Meerut was earlier known as MayRashtra on the name of Mey Daanav, father of Maharani Mandodri, Raavan's wife. (MeyRashtra later got called Meerut in local dialect). Maharani Mandodri, before marriage, used to worship Goddess Chandi in this temple, and since then this Nauchandi mela is held during Chaitra Navratri. A train called Nauchandi Express is run to honor Pracheen Shri Chandi Devi Mata.Now the fair is around 40 days starting from 2nd Sunday after Holi every year. The fair has been held every year, excluding 1858, the year after 1857 revolt, which started from Meerut. Since then even cattle trading has been added along with a number of other activities. During the rule of Mughals Aurangzeb, a shrine was made opposite the temple and fair is now known for unity amongst all communities.The fair was postponed in 2020 due to the Coronavirus pandemic.

== Fair ==
The fair feature shops for Lucknow's Chikan work, Moradabad's brassware, Varanasi's carpets, rugs and silk sarees, Agra's footwear, Kanpur's leather items, etc. Meerut's own products like sports goods, scissors, gajaks, nan-khatai are also sold. Giant rides, wheels, circus and various other recreational arenas where artists perform stunts, remains a big attraction of the fair.

== Gallery ==
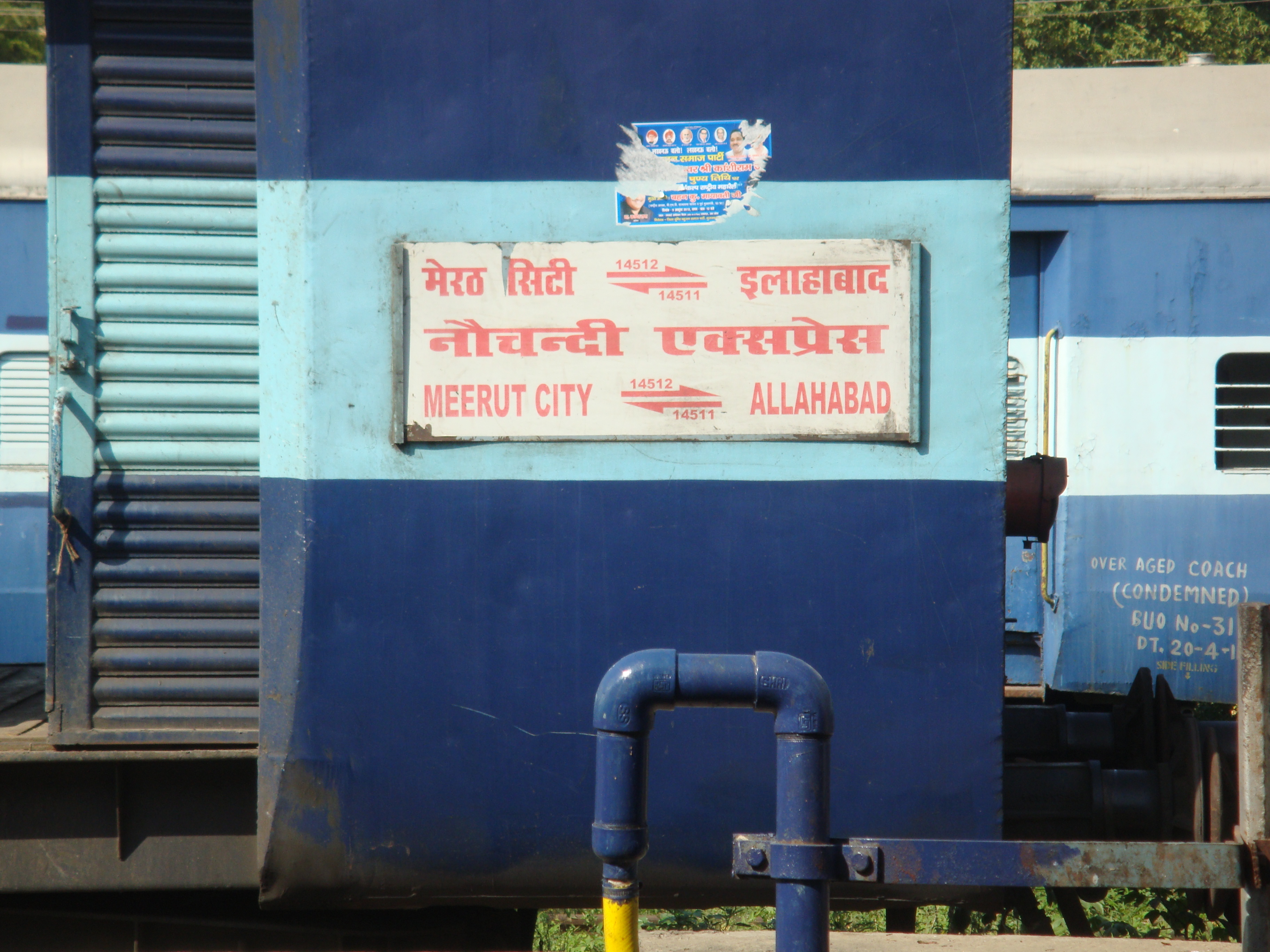
Indian Railways runs a train named Nauchandi Express from Meerut to Lucknow after the name of the Goddess.

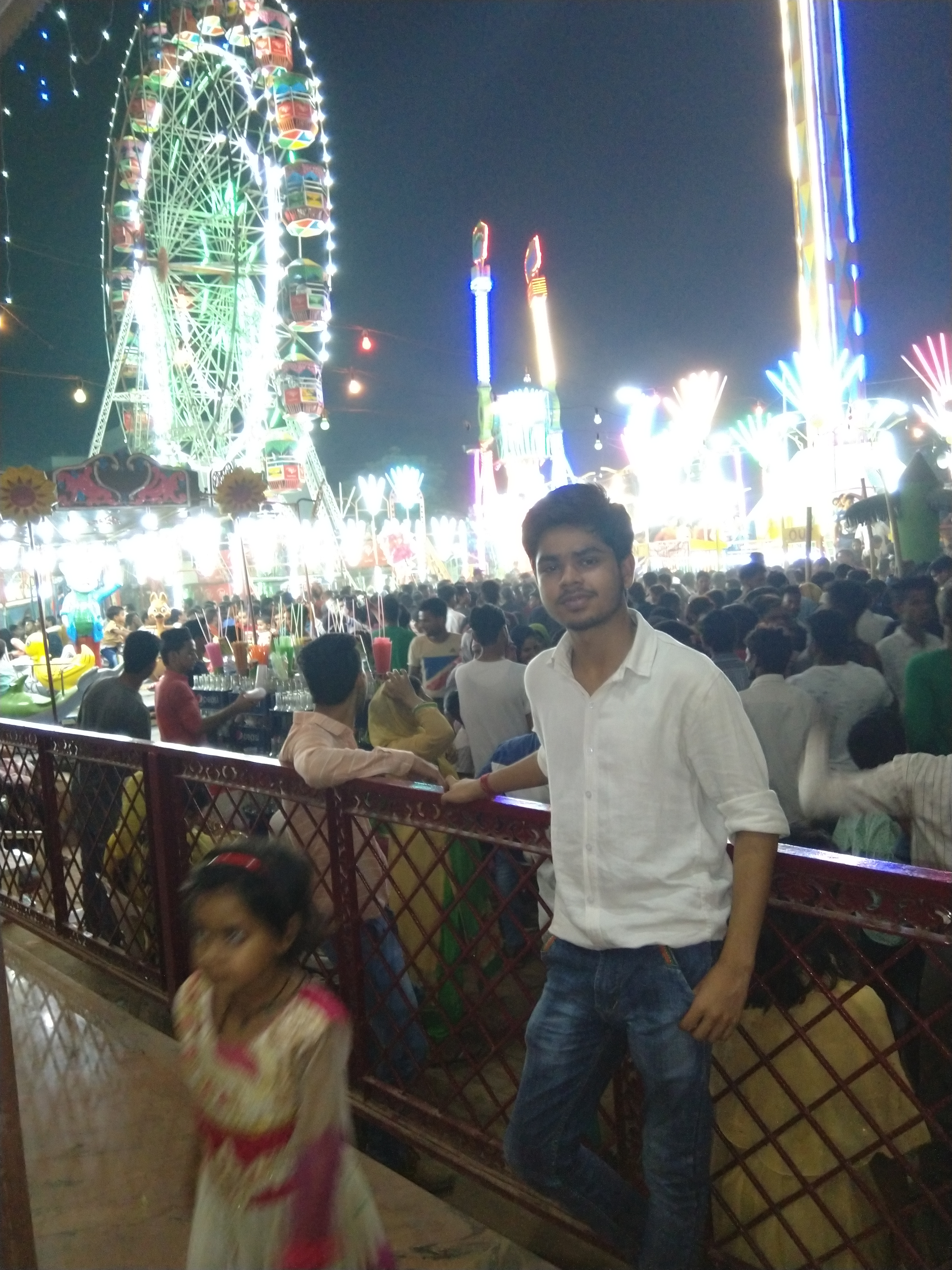
A photo of Nauchandi Mela annually organised in meerut city.

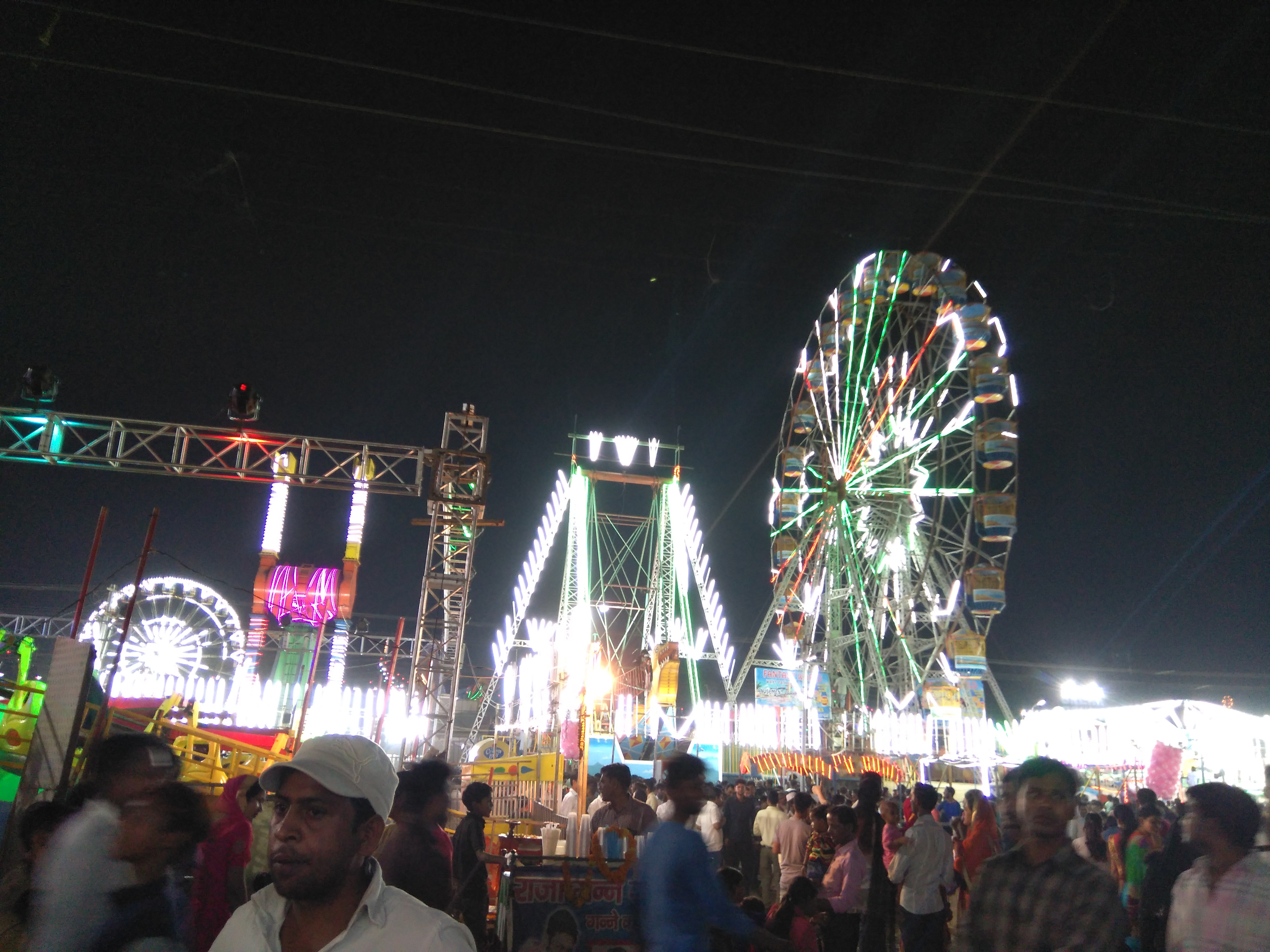
Nauchandi Mela in Meerut, Uttar Pradesh
