= Karnawal, Meerut =

Karnawal
- Town
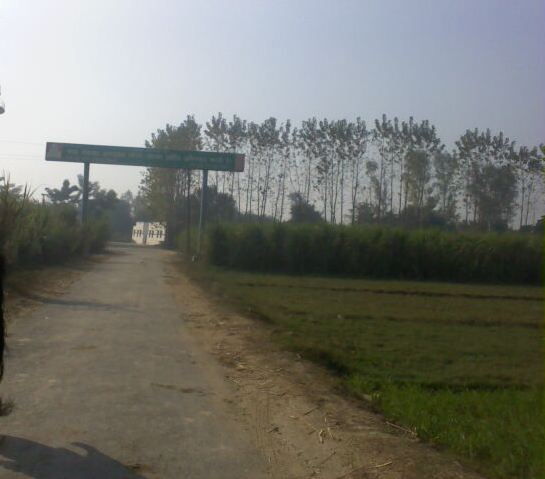
- Main Entrance gate of Karnawal village

- Location in Uttar Pradesh, India
- Coordinates: 29°06′N 77°31′E
- Country: India
- State: Uttar Pradesh
- District: Meerut

Population (2001)
  - Total: 12,618

Languages
  - Official: Hindi
- Time zone: UTC+5:30 (IST)

Karnawal is a town and a nagar panchayat in Meerut district in the Indian state of Uttar Pradesh. This village is located near Sardhana and Barnava. The name Karnawal is derived from the name "Karna" of Mahabharata.

== Demographics ==
As of 2001 India census, Karnawal had a population of 12,618. Males constitute 54% of the population and females 46%. Karnawal has an average literacy rate of 57%, lower than the national average of 59.5%: male literacy is 73%, and female literacy is 37%. In Karnawal, 18% of the population is under 6 years of age. Karnawal is around 12 km away from main city on Sardhana Binoli road. Sugarcane is the main crop of this village.

== Karnawal Town Nagar panchayat Election ==
In the 2023 Urban Local Body elections in Karnawal Lokendra s/o Charan Singh won by a margin of 144 votes getting 1610(24.98%) votes while nearest rival Shiri Satish s/o Hardan got 1466(22.75%) votes making him the runner up candidate.
