= Dhan Singh Gurjar =

Police chief who took part in the 1857 Indian Rebellion

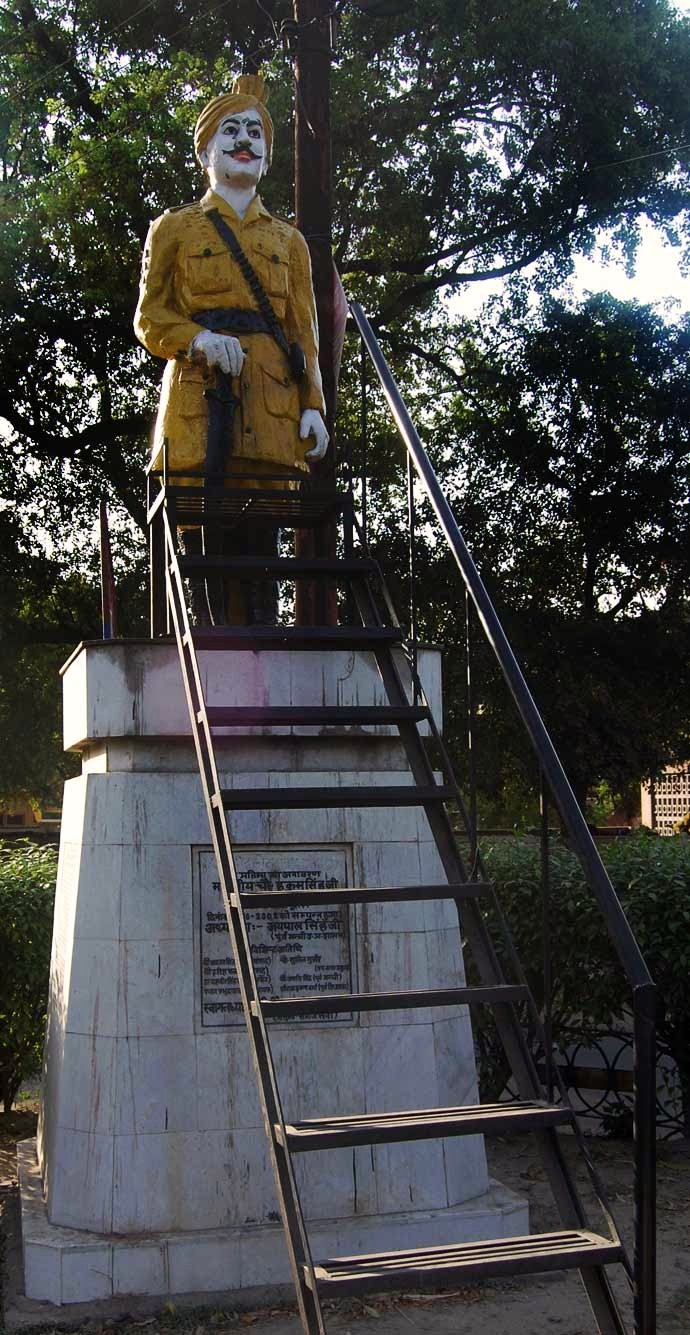
- Statue of Dhan Singh Gurjar in Meerut
- Born: Panchali, Meerut, East India Company
- Died: 4 July 1857 (aged 36–37); Meerut, British India
- Movement: Indian independence movement

Dhan Singh Gurjar, also known as Dhunna Singh, was the Indian kotwal (police chief) of Meerut, who participated in the 1857 rebellion.

== Early life ==
Dhan Singh Gurjar was born in the Panchli or Panchali village in Meerut district to a Gurjar family. many of whom joined the rebellion against British rule in 1857.

== Role in the 1857 rebellion ==
On 10 May 1857, a rebellion against the East India Company rule broke out in Meerut during the 1857 uprising. As the kotwal of the city, Dhan Singh's job was to protect the city. However, many of his officers deserted his force on that day, either to join the rebellion or to escape the rebels' fury. The city saw large-scale rioting, plunder and murder. When two of his chowkidars (guards) apprehended two men for stealing horses, he asked them not to make arrests, fearing reprisals from the rebels. Around midnight, he was called to the house of a Bengali man, which was being plundered by a huge group of armed rioters. Dhan Singh's chowkidars arrested two of the plunderers, but Singh restrained them from using force against them. He then released the two men with the loot, after the group agreed to go away.

Dhan Singh and several other policemen later deserted the police force (kotwali). He is believed to have led thousands of villagers from all across the Meerut district to the city's central jail. According to the official records, the rebels released 839 prisoners from the jail. These prisoners were among the rebels who participated in the siege of Delhi.

Singh was later hanged by the British authorities for his role in the uprising.

== Commemoration ==
- Uttar Pradesh Director General of Police O. P. Singh unveiled the statue of Kotwal Dhan Singh Gurjar on the premises of the Sadar police station in Meerut. He announced that a chapter of Dhan Singh Kotwal would be included in police training, and a documentary would be made to "take his inspiring story of bravery and martyrdom to the public." He also proposed a separate section for Dhan Singh Kotwal in the proposed National Police Museum in Delhi
- "Dhan Singh Kotwal Community Centre", the campus community centre of Meerut University, is named after him.
- The Dhan Singh Gurjar Mahavidyalaya in Loni, Ghaziabad is also named after him.
- Samajwadi Party's (SP) National President and the former Chief Minister Akhilesh Yadav addressed a gathering and unveiled the statue of Kotwal Dhan Singh Gurjar, at Mawana, 20 kilometres from district headquarter Meerut.
- An arterial road running through the Sarita Vihar area of New Delhi is named after Kotwal Dhan Singh.
