= Kithaur =

- Town
- Location in Uttar Pradesh, India Kithaur (India)
- Coordinates: 28.866°N 77.938°E
- Country: India
- State: Uttar Pradesh
- District: Meerut

Population (2001)
  - Total: 23,510

Languages
  - Official: Hindi
- Time zone: UTC+5:30 (IST)
- Vehicle registration: UP
- Website: up.gov.in

Kithaur is a town and a nagar panchayat in Meerut district in the Indian state of Uttar Pradesh.

== Demographics ==
As of 2001 India census, Kithaur had a population of 23,510. Males constituted 52% of the population and females 48%, and 21% of the population was under 6 years of age. Kithaur had an average literacy rate of 42%, lower than the national average of 59.5%, with 52% of males and 32% of females literate.

== Education ==
There is no Degree college in kithaur so the young children have to travel to other places to get the education.

== Health ==
There is no Government Hospital in Kithaur so the patients have to travel 26 kilometers to get the treatment.
