= Department of Horticulture (Punjab, India) =

Government department in Punjab, India

Department of Horticulture, Government of Punjab
- ਬਾਗਬਾਨੀ ਵਿਭਾਗ, ਪੰਜਾਬ ਸਰਕਾਰ

Agency overview
- Headquarters: Kheti Bhawan, Mohali
- Agency executive: Director of Horticulture, Punjab
- Website: horticulture.punjab.gov.in

The Department of Horticulture, Government of Punjab (Punjabi: ਬਾਗਬਾਨੀ ਵਿਭਾਗ, ਪੰਜਾਬ ਸਰਕਾਰ) is the apex body for horticultural development in the state of Punjab, India. It works for increasing the land under horticultural crops, providing quality planting material, providing technical know-how to the farmers, reducing post harvest losses, etc.

The department is responsible for implementation of schemes such as MIDH, Agriculture Infrastructure Fund, Rashtriya Krishi Vikas Yojana, National Bee Keeping and Honey Mission and development of sericulture in the state.

== Punjab Tissue Culture Based Seed Potato Act, 2020 ==
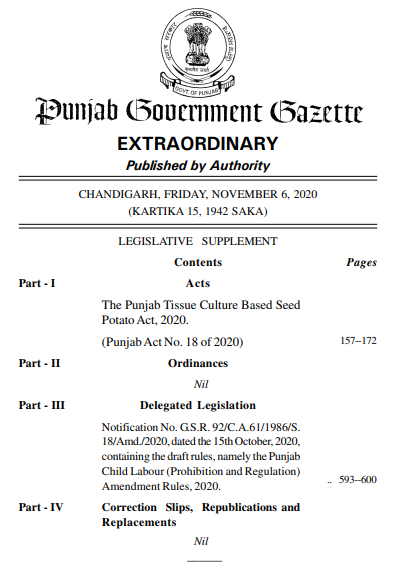
Punjab Government Gazette, CHD/092/2018-2020 notifying the Punjab Tissue Culture Based Seed Potato Act, 2020

The Department of Horticulture, Punjab is the licensing authority for seed potato production and Director of Horticulture, Punjab is the appellate authority as per the Punjab Tissue Culture Based Seed Potato Act, 2020. The Punjab Cabinet approved Punjab Tissue Culture Based Seed Potato Act, 2020 on 30 Oct 2020. It came into effect on 6 Nov 2020. The purpose of this act is to provide for regulating the quality of potato seeds produced through tissue culture plants in aeroponics or net houses, etc. This act makes certification and traceability of potato seed mandatory to ensure quality control. Its implementation helps to incentivize potato production, leading to greater diversification by bringing more area under potato crop cultivation.

== Agriculture Infrastructure Fund ==
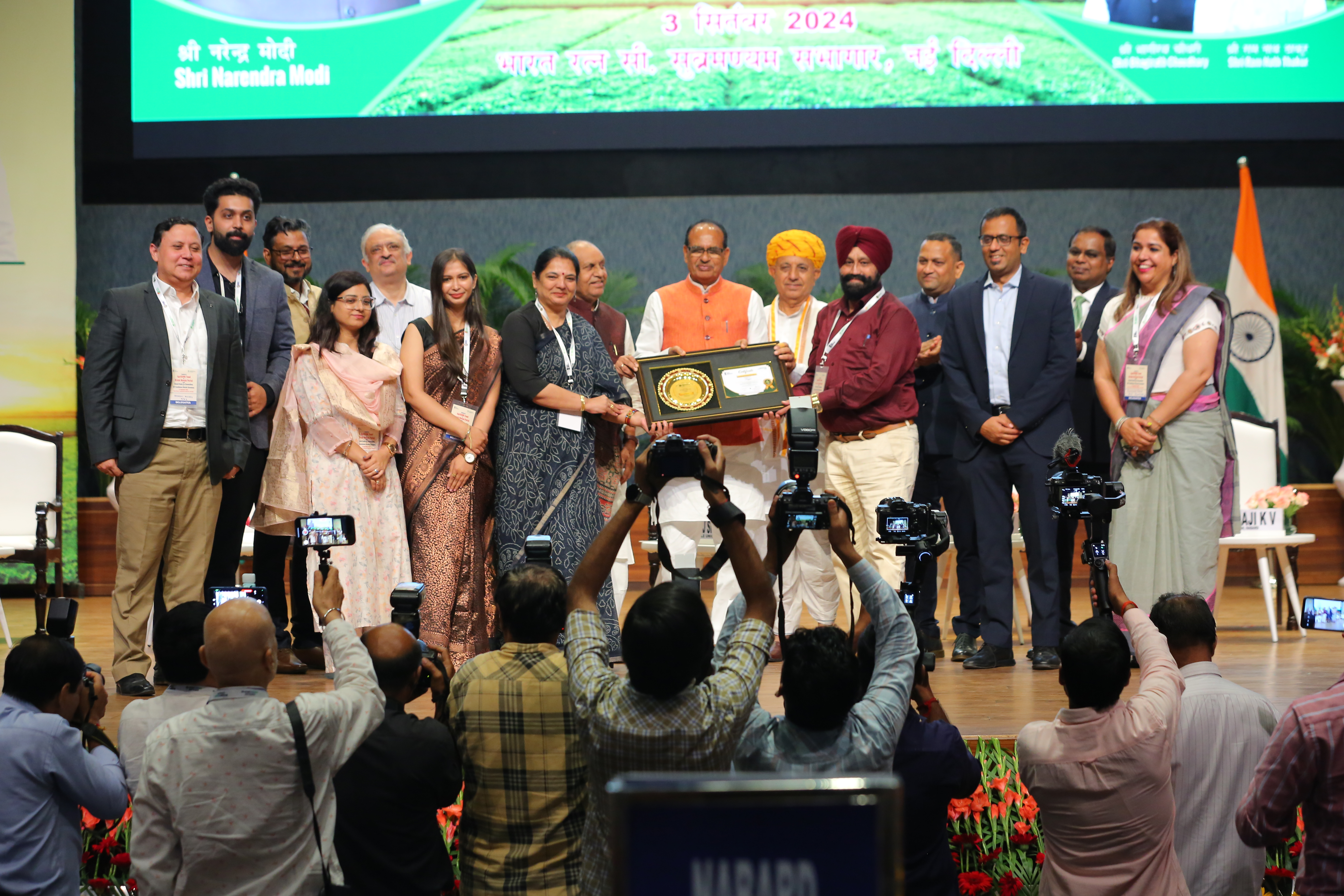
Punjab wins Best Performing State (2023–24) Award at the AIF Excellence Awards held at New Delhi, presented by Minister of Agriculture, India, Shivraj Singh Chouhan (center)

The Government of India launched Agriculture Infrastructure Fund (AIF) Scheme in July 2020 with a corpus of Rs. 1,00,000 crores.to provide financial support to agri-entrepreneurs, start-ups, agri-tech players and farmer groups for infrastructure and logistics facilities. In this fund, Punjab state was initially allotted INR 4713 crore. Punjab achieved this initial target ahead of schedule and accordingly this allocation was increased to Rs. 7,050 Crores in February 2025.

The Department of Horticulture is the state nodal agency for implementation of this scheme in Punjab for which it has set up a Project Monitoring Unit. The department organizes stakeholder activities across the various districts of Punjab to maximize the implementation and awareness of the Agriculture Infrastructure Fund Scheme.

As of October 2023, Punjab state ranks No.1 in India in terms of maximum number of applications sanctioned under the scheme.

As of June 2024, 9 out of the top 10 districts in India are from Punjab (in terms of total number of projects sanctioned).

In January 2025, the Punjab government reported sanctioning of over 20,000 projects under AIF scheme in the state and highlighted the successful promotion of the scheme by the Department of Horticulture.

=== Awards and Recognition ===
Punjab won the "Best Performing State" Award, 2023–24 at the AIF Excellence Awards held at New Delhi on 3 September 2024. The award was presented by Shivraj Singh Chouhan, the Minister of Agriculture & Farmers Welfare, Govt. of India. The Minister of Horticulture Sh. Chetan Singh Jouramajra congratulated the Horticulture Department and the AIF Project Monitoring Unit for their role in elevating the scheme in Punjab.

In January 2026, Punjab was awarded Best Performing State and Best State Project Monitoring Unit at the Agriculture Infrastructure Fund (AIF) Regional Conference held in Chandigarh by the Ministry of Agriculture and Farmers Welfare.

== Punjab Horticulture Advancement and Sustainable Entrepreneurship (PHASE) ==
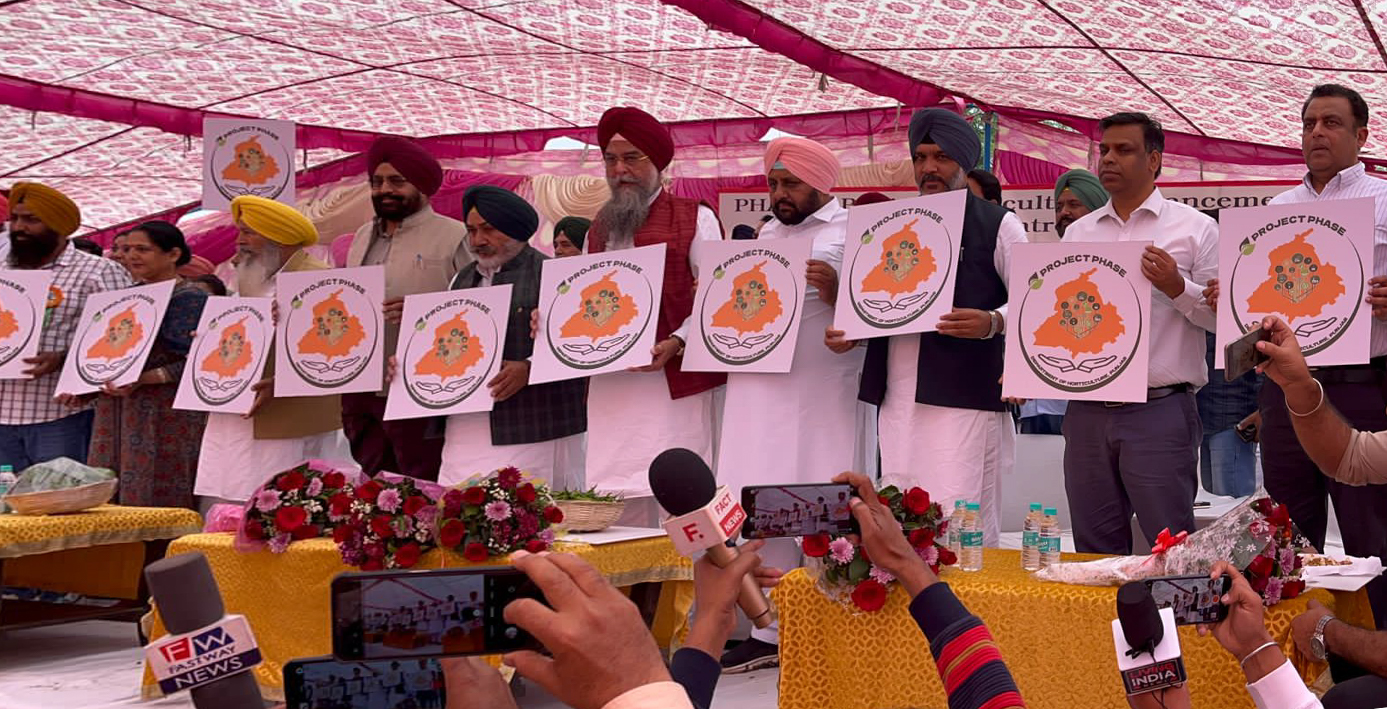
Launch of Chilli Cluster under Project Phase by Kultar Singh Sandhwan, Chetan Singh Jauramajra, Fauja Singh Sarari, and other officials at Ferozepur, Punjab.

The Punjab Horticulture Advancement and Sustainable Entrepreneurship (PHASE) program was launched on March 17 in Ferozepur, Punjab by Chetan Singh Jauramajra, Kultar Singh Sandhawan along with other officials.

Under PHASE, the department has launched a chilli cluster at Ferozepur with the aim of increasing the efficiency in the value chain, improving the marketing of the product and encouraging crop diversification.

As a measure to improve product quality and to develop horticulture crop clusters in major production zones of Punjab, Punjab Horticulture Advancement and Sustainable Entrepreneurship (PHASE) was announced on the state level in the Punjab State Budget 2024-25 presented by finance minister Harpal Singh Cheema at the Vidhan Sabha.

In June 2025, the first shipment of litchi was exported from the cluster in Pathankot district to Doha and Dubai. The consignment, comprising rose-scented litchi, was facilitated by the Agricultural and Processed Food Products Export Development Authority in collaboration with the Punjab Department of Horticulture and other stakeholders.

In April 2026, a consignment of green chillies was exported to Dubai from the cluster in Ferozepur district, in what was described as the state's first such shipment. The consignment was flagged off by Kultar Singh Sandhwan, Speaker of the Punjab Legislative Assembly. The initiative was associated with the department's efforts efforts to enhance farmers’ market access and promote agricultural exports from the state.

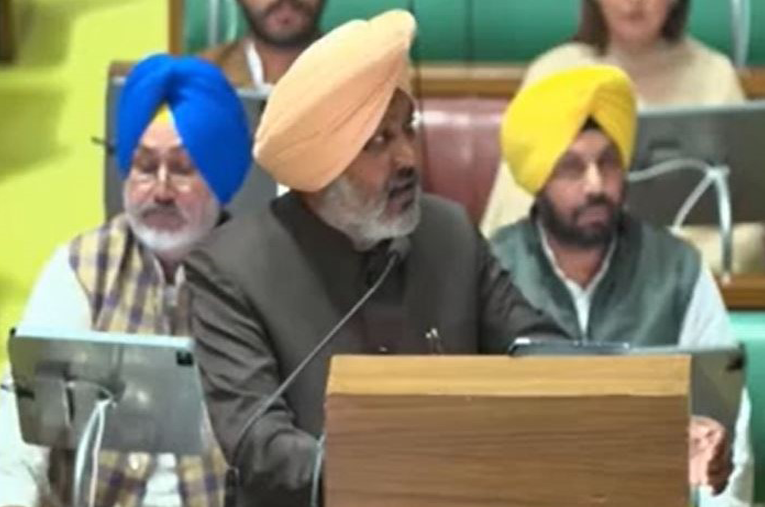
Finance Minister announcing PHASE Scheme at Punjab Vidhan Sabha

== Estates ==
The Department of Horticulture, Punjab works to establish various estates across Punjab based on horticultural crops. These estates are equipped with the technological information and machinery to provide facilities to the horticulturists for producing high-quality fruits and cutting the cost of fruit production. Training and information dissemination activities are conducted in these estates for the farmers of the region. Citrus Estate, Hoshiarpur houses Punjab's first biofertilizer production laboratory.

List of estates
S.no	Name of the Estate	Location	Villages covered	Image
1	Citrus Estate	Badal	85	
2	Citrus Estate	Bhunga	379	
3	Citrus Estate	Hoshiarpur	150	
4	Citrus Estate	Tahliwala Jattan	213	
5	Citrus Estate	Abohar	99	
6	Pear Estate	Amritsar	District Amritsar, Tarn Taran and surroundings	
7	Guava Estate	Patiala	District Patiala and surroundings	
8	Litchi Estate	Pathankot	District Pathankot, Hoshiarpur and Gurdaspur	

== Sericulture ==
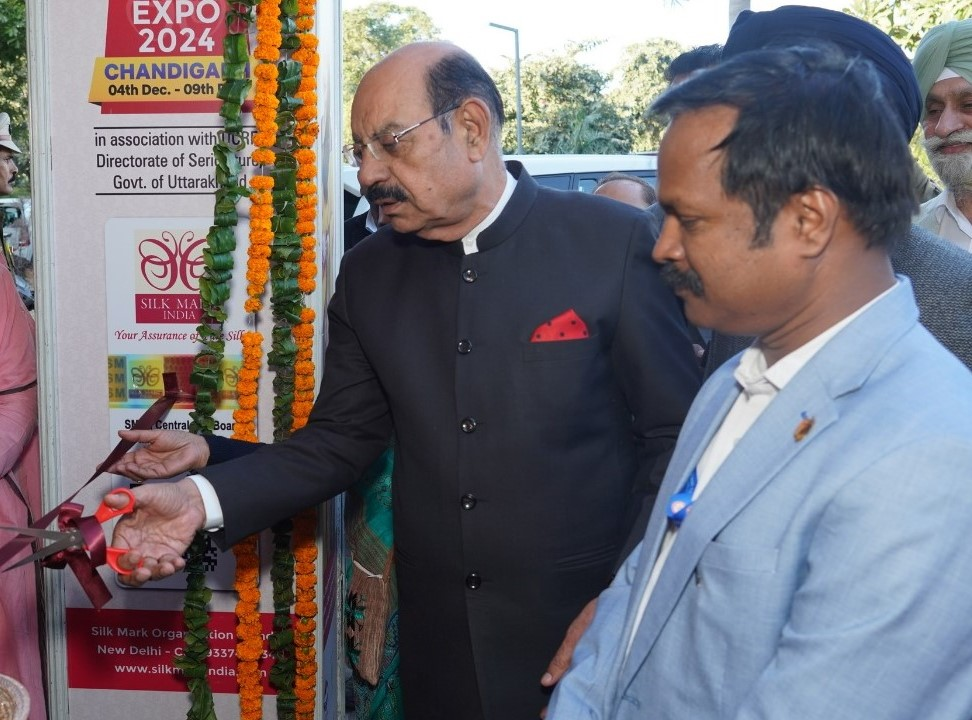
Inauguration of the Silk Mark Expo 2024 in Chandigarh by Cabinet Minister Sh. Mohinder Bhagat (Government of Punjab). P. Sivakumar, Member Secretary, Central Silk Board (Government of India) on the right.

The Sericulture Wing of the Department of Horticulture, Punjab, is responsible for managing silk production in the state, with an emphasis on supporting small-scale and economically disadvantaged farmers. Punjab's silk production is concentrated in the Hoshiarpur, Gurdaspur, Rupnagar and Pathankot districts, and the state primarily produces bivoltine mulberry and eri silk.

Sericulture wing of the department has won the SKOCH Silver Award in 2024 for project titled 'Women Empowerment and Socio-Economic Growth through Sericulture'. Earlier, it had achieved the semi final position in 2023.

=== Punjab Silk ===
In 2024, the Punjab government launched the "Punjab Silk" brand with an intention to provide recognition and marketability of local silk and boost farmer incomes.

As part of the initiative, the government reopened the Dalhousie silk seed production center, which had previously been closed. This center is aimed at enhancing the availability of silk seeds to support local production. Additionally, there are plans to establish a silk reeling unit in Pathankot, intended to facilitate local processing of silk cocoons and reduce production costs.

The sericulture initiative is designed to benefit approximately 1,200 to 1,400 farmers, many of whom come from disadvantaged backgrounds. By focusing on local silk processing and introducing the "Punjab Silk" brand, the department is aiming to streamline production and improve marketability for locally produced silk. These efforts are part of a broader strategy to support rural communities engaged in sericulture and strengthen the sector's economic contribution to the region's agricultural economy.

=== Silk Mark Expo ===
The Silk Mark Expo 2024 was conducted for the first time in Chandigarh from 4/12/24 by the Silk Mark Organization of India- Central Silk Board, in collaboration with the Sericulture Wing, Department of Horticulture, Punjab. This expo was launched to encourage silk farming in Punjab, to act as a platform for artisans and traders from all over India and to showcase the growth of sericulture in Punjab.

The Expo was inaugurated by Minister of Horticulture, Shri Mohinder Bhagat. The Minister also launched a document titled 'Journey of Sericulture in Punjab' which highlights the initiatives, growth, and achievements of sericulture sector of the state.

== Center of Excellence and other infrastructure ==
The department has established Centers of Excellence for vegetables, fruits, potato and floriculture at Kartarpur, Hoshiarpur, Jalandhar, Ludhiana respectively. These centers function as sites for front line demonstrations, training as well as sources of quality planting material. Stakeholder activities are organized in these centers for development of horticulture in the state. Other infrastructure include potato seed farms, community canning centers, fruit preservation lab, landscape units, mushroom lab and nurseries. The Center of Excellence for Vegetables won the SKOCH Award (Silver), while the Center of Excellence for Potato was a semi-finalist at the SKOCH Awards for the year 2023.
