= Phalauda =

- Town
- Location in Uttar Pradesh, India
- Coordinates: 29.187°N 77.829°E
- Country: India
- State: Uttar Pradesh
- District: Meerut
- Elevation: 221 m (725 ft)

Population (2001)
  - Total: 17,200

Languages
  - Official: Hindi
- Time zone: UTC+5:30 (IST)

Phalauda is a town and a nagar panchayat in Meerut district in the Indian state of Uttar Pradesh.

== Geography ==
Phalauda is located at 29.187°N 77.829°E. It has an average elevation of 221 metres (725 feet).

== Demographics ==
As of 2001 India census, Phalauda had a population of 17,200. Males constitute 53% of the population and females 47%. Phalauda has an average literacy rate of 49%, lower than the national average of 59.5%: male literacy is 59%, and female literacy is 38%. In Phalauda, 19% of the population is under 6 years of age.
