= Akarli Dhansingh =

Village in Rajasthan, India

- Neighbourhood
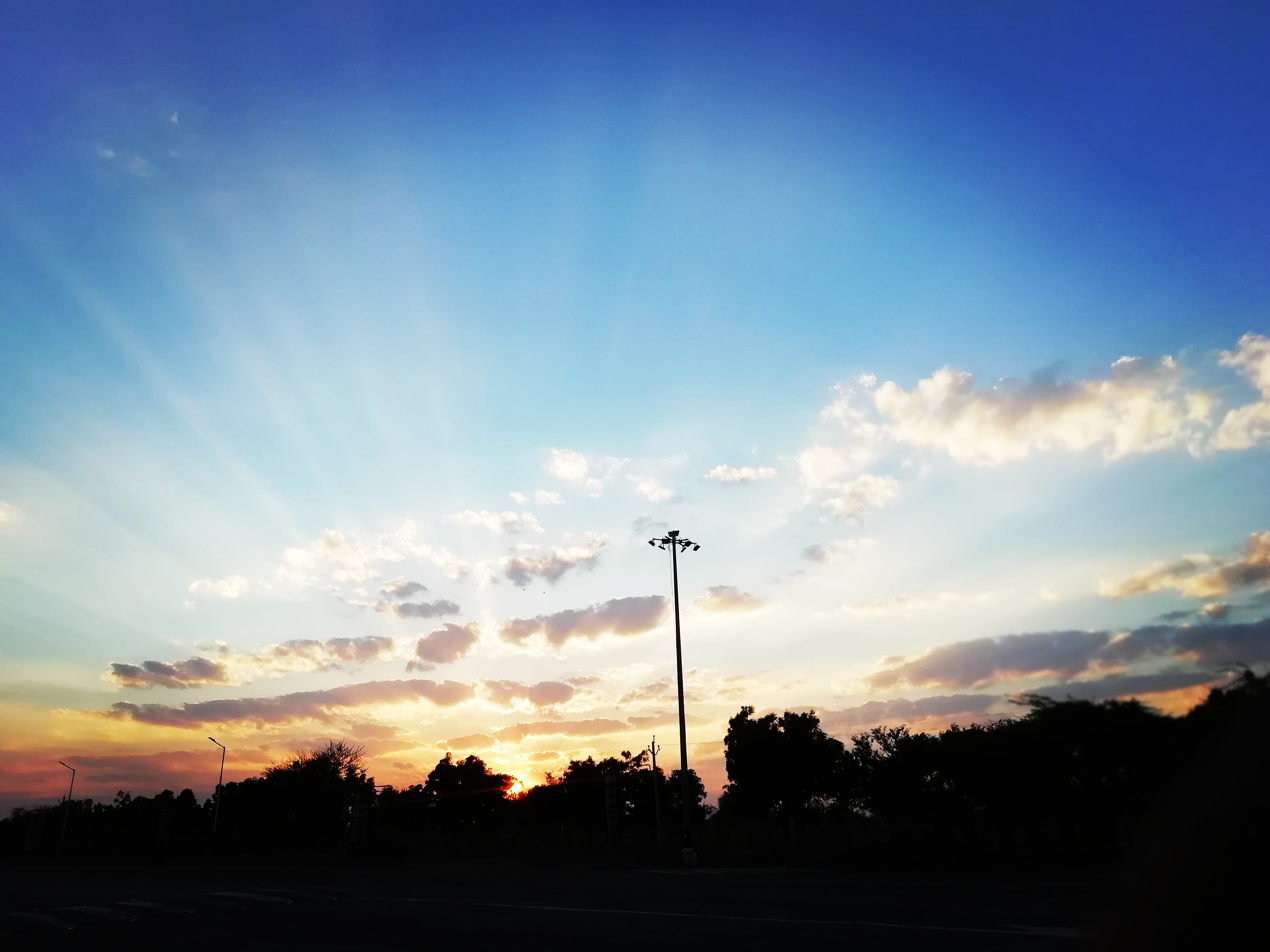
- Sky at Akarli Dhansingh, Barmer

- Location in Rajasthan, India Akarli Dhansingh (India)
- Coordinates: 25.49°N 72.13°E
- Country: India
- State: Rajasthan
- District: Barmer
- Elevation: 107 m (351 ft)

Population (2011)
  - Total: 724

Languages
  - Official: Hindi, Marwari
- Time zone: UTC+5:30 (IST)
- Telephone code: 02988
- ISO 3166 code: RJ-IN
- Vehicle registration: RJ-39
- Sex ratio: 935 ♂/♀

Akarli Dhansingh (आकड़ली धनसिंह) village in Pachpadra tehsil of Barmer district in Rajasthan, India. As of the 2011 India census, the total population of the village is 724.
