= Bhopgarh =

Bhoopgarh (Village ID 187889) is a small village near Gorakhpur city in Uttar Pradesh, India. According to the 2011 census it has a population of 3108 living in 413 households.
