= Nain Singh Nagar =

Raja Nain Singh Nagar & Rao Jeta Gujar(Raja Jait(Jit) Singh Gujar)
- Born: 2nd november, 1746; Behsuma, Uttar Pradesh
- Children: Raja Nattha Singh
- Parents: Raja Gulab Singh Nagar (father); Queen Maaya (mother)

Rao Jeta Gujar (Raja Jait(Jit) Singh) And Raja Nain singh Nagar

== History ==
An account about Raja Nain Singh Nagar in (1857) noted by Edwin Thomas Atkinson as;

As early as 1540 A.D. the Gujars of the Duab were powerful enough to interfere with Sher Shah whilst building his fort¹ and mosque at Dehli. Sher Shah himself marched against Páli and Páhal and reduced the Gújars to subjection. "He left orders that they should be expelled from that country; consequently, not a vestige of their habitations was left." They however did not attain to any political influence until the middle of the last century, when the foundations of the great mukararis of Rajas Ramdayál Singh and Raja Nain Singh were laid in the Saharanpur and Meerut Districts.
