= Parikshitgarh =

- Town
- Location in Uttar Pradesh, India
- Coordinates: 28°59′N 77°56′E
- Country: India
- State: Uttar Pradesh
- District: Meerut

Population (2001)
  - Total: 17,399

Languages
  - Official: Hindi
- Time zone: UTC+5:30 (IST)
- Postal code: 250406
- Vehicle registration: UP-15

Parikshitgarh is a town and a Nagar Panchayat in Meerut district in the Indian state of Uttar Pradesh.

== Demographics ==
As of 2001 India census, Parikshitgarh had a population of 17,399. Males constitute 62% of the population and females 38%. Parikshitgarh has an average literacy rate of 76%, higher than the national average of 74%: male literacy is 60%, and female literacy is 50%. In Parikshitgarh, 17% of the population is under 6 years of age.

== History ==
Parikshitgarh (literally, "Parikshit's fort") is said to have been built by the legendary king Dushyanta. Excavations have yielded pots of coins and pottery pieces, validating the antiquity of the place. The ashram of Rishi Shringi, that great medicine-man and facilitator to the birth of the sons of the King Dashrath, also lies nearby, re-affirming the mythological origins of the town of Parikshitgarh.

- According to a legend, the fort Parikshitgarh, that was built by Raja Parikshit. Later, restored by Raja Nain Singh in the 18th century. The fort was dismantled in 1857, to be used as a police station.

== Notable people ==
- Raja nain singh nagar

== Famous monuments ==
- Gandhar - A pond or "talab" which is believed to be the bathing place of Gandhari. There is also a Shiv Lingam which has appeared from the earth and if seen from the top trishool is also visible on the top of Shiv Lingam.
- Gopeshwar Mandir - There is a Shiv Lingam which is believed to be made by lord Krishna to worship lord Shiva during his stay at parikshitgarh (named after King Parikshit who was grandson of great Arjun) while going to Hastinapur as shanti doot before the war of Mahabharata.
- Navaldeh Koop - A well the water of which is believed to cure skin diseases.
- Maharaj Shringi Rishi Aashram - An ancient Aasharm which is in the outskirts of town on the way to village Badhla.
- Three ancient caves which leads to the Hastinapur (Believed capital of Pandva and Korvas), entry is currently closed.
- Sardar Bhagat Singh- It is a well known divider in parikshit garh.
- There is a tree from where the Kali Yuga was started. It is located near Maharaj Shringi Rishi Aashram.
