= Peeragarhi metro station =

Metro station in Delhi, India

Peeragarhi पीरागढ़ी

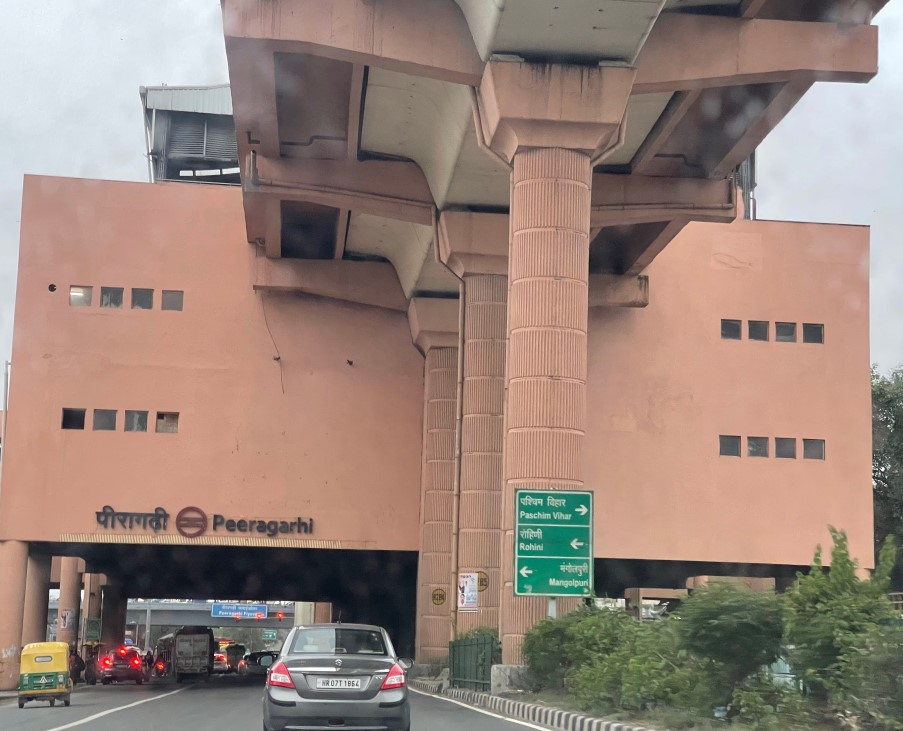

General information
- Location: Main Rohtak Rd, Peeragarhi Village, Peera Garhi, West Delhi, Delhi, 110087
- Coordinates: 28°40′47″N 77°05′33″E
- System: Delhi Metro station
- Owner: Delhi Metro
- Line: Green Line Magenta Line
- Platforms: Side platform; Platform-1 → Brigadier Hoshiyar Singh; Platform-2 → Inderlok / Kirti Nagar
- Tracks: 2

Construction
- Structure type: Elevated
- Platform levels: 2
- Parking: Available
- Accessible: Yes

Other information
- Station code: PAGI

History
- Opened: 2 April 2010; 16 years ago
- Electrified: 25 kV 50 Hz AC through overhead catenary

Passengers
- Jan 2015: 11,510 /day 356,796/ Month average

Services
Preceding station	Delhi Metro	Following station
Udyog Nagar towards Brigadier Hoshiyar Singh	Green Line	Paschim Vihar West towards Inderlok or Kirti Nagar
Future service
Mangolpuri towards Ramakrishna Ashram Marg	Magenta Line	Paschim Vihar towards Botanical Garden
Route map
Location

Peeragarhi is a metro station on the Green Line of the Delhi Metro and is located at Peeragarhi in the West Delhi district of Delhi. It is an elevated station and was inaugurated on 2 April 2010.

== Etymology ==
The station is named after the "Peeragarhi" village. The history of Peeragarhi (also referred to as Garhi Pira) is deeply rooted in the agrarian and defensive traditions of the Delhi-Haryana frontier. The name is a compound of the Hindi words "Garhi" (गढ़ी), meaning a "small fort" or "fortified enclosure," and "Peera" (पीरा), which likely refers to a local Muslim Peer or a prominent founding figure of the settlement. The defensive nature of the settlement is reflected in its name, "Garhi" (गढ़ी) denoting a fortified residential enclosure commonly used by local agrarian clans for protection against raiding parties and regional skirmishes during the 18th and 19th centuries.

== Station layout ==
L2	Side platform | Doors will open on the left
L2	Platform 2 Eastbound	Towards → Inderlok / Kirti Nagar; Next Station: Paschim Vihar West
L2	Platform 1 Westbound	Towards ← Brigadier Hoshiyar Singh; Next Station: Udyog Nagar
L2	Side platform | Doors will open on the left
L1	Concourse	Fare control, station agent, Metro Card vending machines, crossover
G	Street level	Exit/Entrance

== Facilities ==
ATMs are available at Peeragarhi metro station.

== Transport interchange ==
=== Metro's Green and Magenta lines ===
The existing Peeagarhi metro station on Green Line (Bahadurgarh-Indraprastha route along the NH9) is set to be an interchange with the Magenta Line (Indraprastha-Okhla Bird Sanctuary route along the Outer Ring Road) as a new station with the same name is currently being constructed. The existing Peeragarhi Metro station on Green line will be connected to the new Peeragarhi metro station on Magenta line via a 140 m-long (460 ft) footbridge for the passenger transfer. When ready by 2026, it will ease traffic woes and improve connectivity to northern and southern parts of Delhi, IGI Airport, Noida International Airport and Noida.

=== Peera Garhi Chowk long distance buses ===
Peera Garhi Chowk is a major intersection of Outer Ring Road and NH-9 Rohtak-Hisar Road adjacent to the Peeragarhi metro station. The chowk lies in the Paschim Vihar area, and is a major transport hub on the NH-9 where long-distance buses between Delhi and western Haryana (Bahadurgarh, Rohtak, Hansi, Hisar, Fatehabad, Sirsa and Dabwali), western Punjab (Bathinda, Abohar and Fazilka), and north Rajasthan (Nohar, Bhadra, Hanumangarh, Sri Ganganagar, Rawatsar, and Suratgarh) are available 24x7 with to 10 minutes frequency. Once the under-construction Keshopur and Peeragahri Magenta Line stations on Megenta line are completed, bus passengers can switch to Magenta Line for connection to IGI Airport T1.

== Attractions ==
The Peragarhi village's religious and communal identity centers on the Prachin Sidh Baba Mandir and its associated water structures. Over the late 20th century, the expansion of the Outer Ring Road and the rapid urbanization of the West Delhi corridor transformed Peeragarhi from a rural agricultural community into a major transit and commercial hub. Despite this modernization, the local community continues to preserve the oral traditions and "personal history" of the site, maintaining the baoli and temple as vestiges of the village's pre-colonial past.

- Prachin Sidh Baba Mandir temple complex: is a Hindu temple on the western flank of Outer Ring Road and 650m south of Peeragarhi metro station, also has the following:
  - Dada Sidh Maharaj pond: a shallower, rectangular basin lined with broad stone slabs.

  - Peeragarhi Baoli is a historical subterranean stepwell located in Peeragarhi Village, Delhi, situated approximately 20–30 metres south-southwest of the Prachin Sidh Baba Mandir on the western side of the Outer Ring Road. The baoli consists of a deep, circular masonry well with a dedicated internal flight of stone steps designed to access the water table during fluctuating seasonal levels. Baoli was primarily utilized for potable water and specific Hindu ritual ablutions, with local tradition attributing therapeutic properties to its source. Although the site has undergone modern modifications, including the installation of protective iron grates and cement plastering that partially obscure its original stonework, the underlying masonry aligns with the 18th or 19th-century vernacular water architecture prevalent in the Delhi-Haryana region. The Peeragarhi Baoli, constructed using local masonry techniques, reflects the 19th-century focus on hydraulic engineering to sustain semi-arid settlements. Despite its local religious significance, the structure remains an unlisted heritage site, lacking formal protection from the Archaeological Survey of India (ASI) or the Delhi Heritage Conservation Committee.
- Prachin Shiv Mandir and park: further west of Prachin Sidh Baba Mandir.

== Present status ==
- 2023 April: Under-construction Keshopur and additional Peeragahri Meganta Line stations on Meganta line are completed by September 2025, bus passengers can switch to Magenta Line for connection to IGI Airport T1.

== See also ==
- List of Delhi Metro stations
- Transport in Delhi
- Delhi Metro Rail Corporation
- Delhi Suburban Railway
- List of rapid transit systems in India
