= Ghevra metro station =

Metro station in Delhi, India

Ghevra

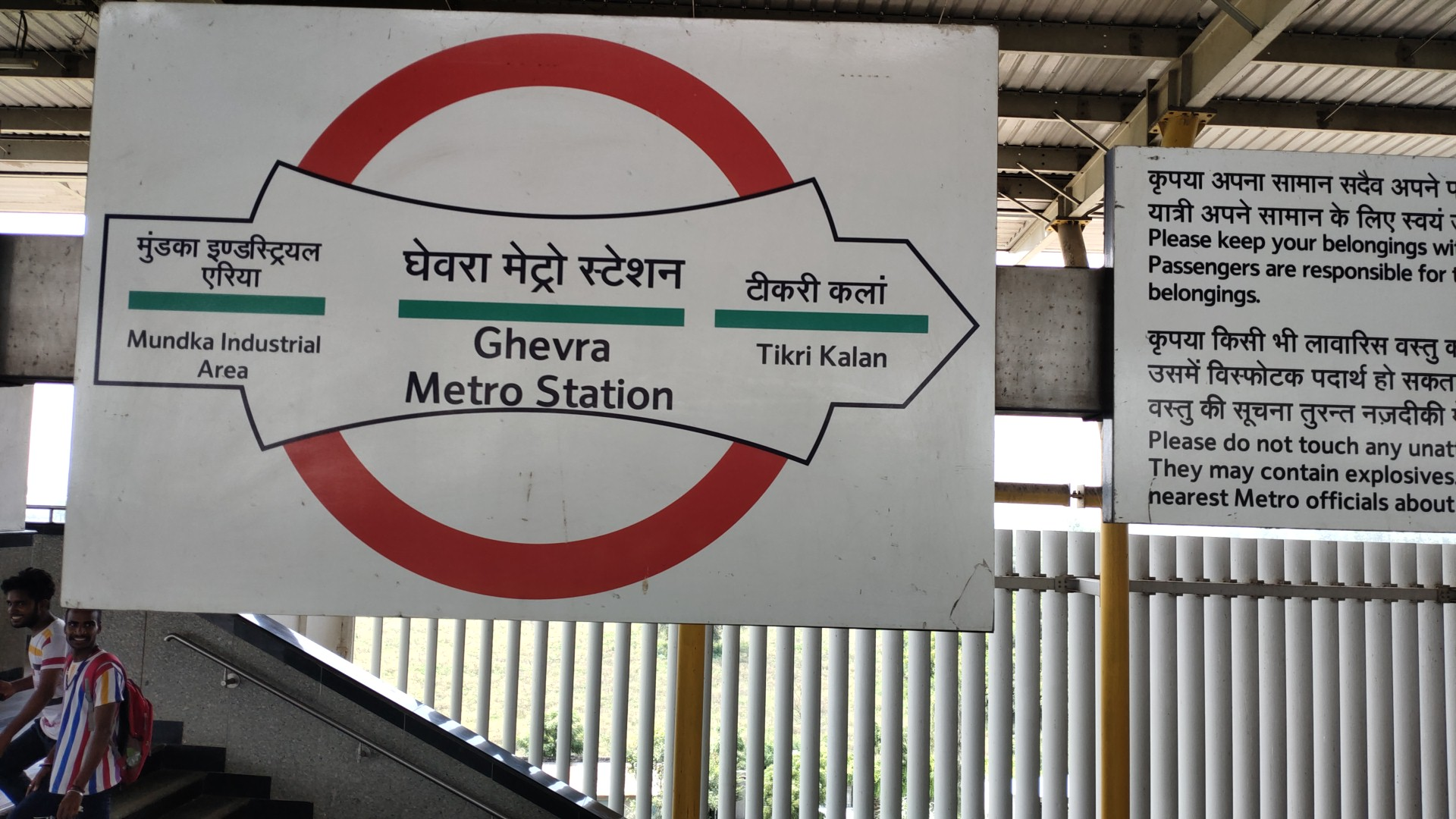

General information
- Location: Rohtak-Bahadurgarh Road, Ghevra Village, North West Delhi, Delhi, 110081
- Coordinates: 28°41′07″N 76°59′45″E
- System: Delhi Metro station
- Owner: Delhi Metro Rail Corporation
- Line: Green Line
- Platforms: Side platform; Platform-1 → Brigadier Hoshiyar Singh; Platform-2 → Inderlok / Kirti Nagar
- Tracks: 2

Construction
- Structure type: Elevated
- Platform levels: 2
- Accessible: Yes

Other information
- Station code: GHEM

History
- Opened: 24 June 2018; 8 years ago
- Electrified: 25 kV 50 Hz AC through overhead catenary

Services
| Preceding station | Delhi Metro | Following station |
|---|---|---|
| Tikri Kalan towards Brigadier Hoshiyar Singh | Green Line | Mundka Industrial Area towards Inderlok or Kirti Nagar |
Route map
Location

Ghevra metro station is located on the Green Line of the Delhi Metro in Ghevra Village in the North West Delhi district of Delhi. It is an elevated station and opened on 24 June 2018.

== Station layout ==
| L2 | Side platform | Doors will open on the left |
| L2 | Platform 2 Eastbound | Towards → Inderlok / Kirti Nagar; Next Station: Mundka Industrial Area |
| L2 | Platform 1 Westbound | Towards ← Brigadier Hoshiyar Singh; Next Station: Tikri Kalan |
| L2 | Side platform | Doors will open on the left |
| L1 | Concourse | Fare control, station agent, Metro Card vending machines, crossover |
| G | Street Level | Exit/Entrance |

== Facilities ==
List of available ATM at Ghevra metro station are

== See also ==
- List of Delhi Metro stations
- Transport in Delhi
- Delhi Metro Rail Corporation
- Delhi Suburban Railway
- List of rapid transit systems in India
