= Tikri Border metro station =

Metro station in Delhi, India

Tikri Border

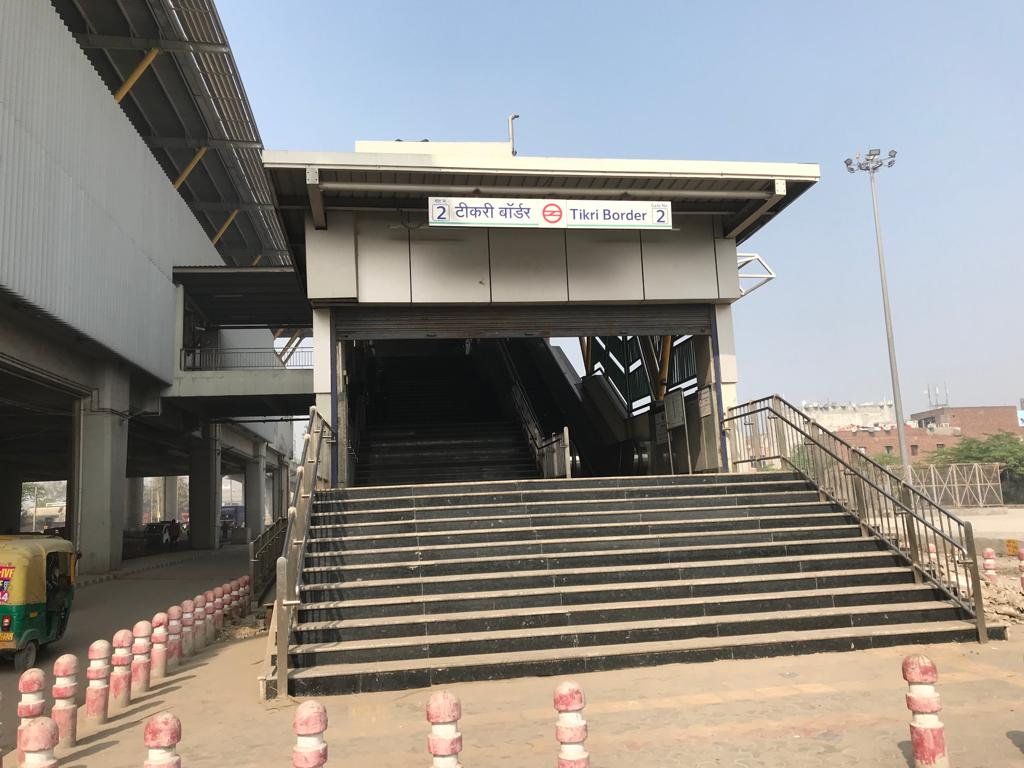

General information
- Location: Rohtak-Bahadurgarh Road, Tikri Kalan Village, North West Delhi, Delhi, 110041
- Coordinates: 28°41′17″N 76°57′51″E
- System: Delhi Metro station
- Owner: Delhi Metro Rail Corporation
- Line: Green Line
- Platforms: Side platform; Platform-1 → Brigadier Hoshiyar Singh; Platform-2 → Inderlok / Kirti Nagar
- Tracks: 2

Construction
- Structure type: Elevated
- Platform levels: 2
- Accessible: Yes

Other information
- Station code: TKBR

History
- Opened: 24 June 2018; 8 years ago
- Electrified: 25 kV 50 Hz AC through overhead catenary

Services
Preceding station	Delhi Metro	Following station
Pandit Shree Ram Sharma towards Brigadier Hoshiyar Singh	Green Line	Tikri Kalan towards Inderlok or Kirti Nagar
Route map
Location

Tikri Border is a station on the Green Line of the Delhi Metro and is located on Delhi-Haryana Border in Tikri Kalan Village in the North West Delhi district of Delhi. It is an elevated station and opened on 24 June 2018.

== Station layout ==
L2	Side platform | Doors will open on the left
L2	Platform 2 Eastbound	Towards → Inderlok / Kirti Nagar; Next Station: Tikri Kalan
L2	Platform 1 Westbound	Towards ← Brigadier Hoshiyar Singh; Next Station: Pandit Shree Ram Sharma
L2	Side platform | Doors will open on the left
L1	Concourse	Fare control, station agent, Metro Card vending machines, crossover
G	Street Level	Exit/Entrance

== Facilities ==
List of available ATM at Tikri Border metro station are

== Exits ==
Tikri Border metro station exits
Gate No-1	Gate No-2
Govt. Girl Senior. Sec School	
Sarvodaya Kanya Vidyalaya Tikri	

== See also ==
- List of Delhi Metro stations
- Transport in Delhi
- Delhi Metro Rail Corporation
- Delhi Suburban Railway
- List of rapid transit systems in India
