= Tikri Kalan metro station =

Metro station in Delhi, India

Tikri Kalan

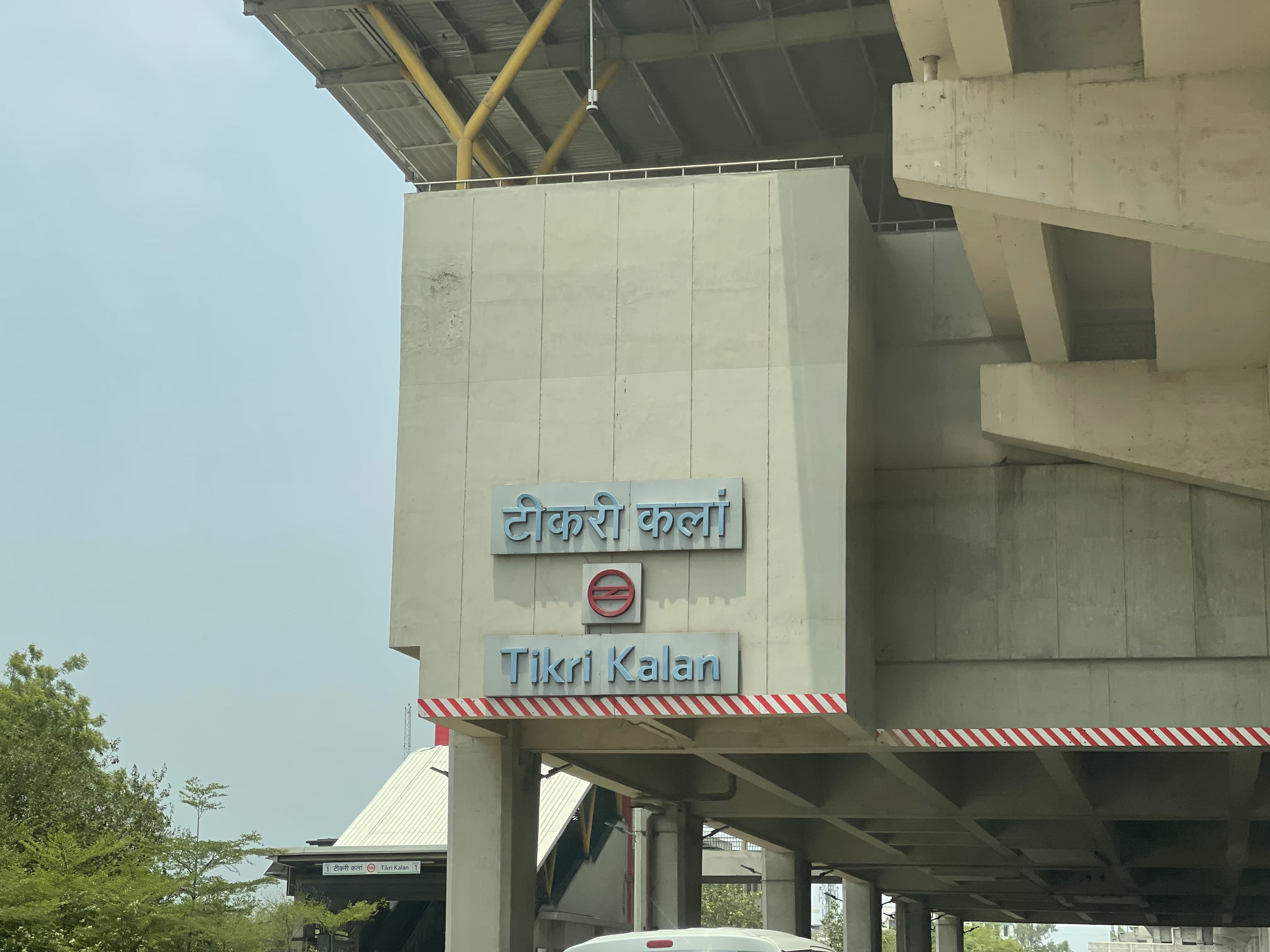

General information
- Location: Rohtak-Bahadurgarh Road, Tikri Kalan Village, North West Delhi, Delhi, 110041
- Coordinates: 28°41′13″N 76°58′38″E
- System: Delhi Metro station
- Owner: Delhi Metro Rail Corporation
- Line: Green Line
- Platforms: Side platform; Platform-1 → Brigadier Hoshiyar Singh; Platform-2 → Inderlok / Kirti Nagar
- Tracks: 2

Construction
- Structure type: Elevated
- Platform levels: 2
- Accessible: Yes

Other information
- Station code: TKLM

History
- Opened: 24 June 2018; 8 years ago
- Electrified: 25 kV 50 Hz AC through overhead catenary

Services
| Preceding station | Delhi Metro | Following station |
|---|---|---|
| Tikri Border towards Brigadier Hoshiyar Singh | Green Line | Ghevra towards Inderlok or Kirti Nagar |
Route map
Location

Tikri Kalan is a station on the Green Line of the Delhi Metro and is located in Tikri Kalan Village in the North West Delhi district of Delhi. It is an elevated station and opened on 24 June 2018.

== Station layout ==
| L2 | Side platform | Doors will open on the left |
| L2 | Platform 2 Eastbound | Towards → Inderlok / Kirti Nagar; Next Station: Ghevra |
| L2 | Platform 1 Westbound | Towards ← Brigadier Hoshiyar Singh; Next Station: Tikri Border |
| L2 | Side platform | Doors will open on the left |
| L1 | Concourse | Fare control, station agent, Metro Card vending machines, crossover |
| G | Street Level | Exit/Entrance |

== Facilities ==
List of available ATM at Tikri Kalan metro station are

== See also ==
- List of Delhi Metro stations
- Transport in Delhi
- Delhi Metro Rail Corporation
- Delhi Suburban Railway
- List of rapid transit systems in India
