= Green Line (Delhi Metro) =

Line on the Delhi Metro system

Green Line (Line 5)
- A Mitsubishi-Rotem-BEML train at the Rajdhani Park metro station

Overview
- Status: Operational
- Locale: Delhi, Bahadurgarh
- Termini: Inderlok / Kirti Nagar; Brigadier Hoshiyar Singh
- Stations: 24

Service
- Type: Rapid transit
- System: Delhi Metro
- Operator: DMRC
- Depots: Mundka; Bahadurgarh
- Rolling stock: Mitsubishi-Rotem-BEML

History
- Opened: 3 April 2010; 16 years ago
- Last extension: 24 June 2018

Technical
- Line length: 28.79 km (17.89 mi)
- Character: Elevated and at-grade
- Track gauge: 1,435 mm (4 ft 8 1/2 in) standard gauge
- Electrification: 25 kV 50 Hz AC from overhead catenary
- Signaling: Bombardier Transportation: CITYFLO 350

The Green Line (Line 5) is a rapid transit metro line of the Delhi Metro in Delhi, India. It consists of 24 stations covering a total length of 28.79 km (17.89 mi). It runs between Inderlok and Brigadier Hoshiyar Singh with a branch line connecting the line's Ashok Park Main station with Kirti Nagar station.

The line is almost fully elevated (except for Kirti Nagar Metro Station, which is at-grade) and runs mostly along the busy NH 9 route in North Delhi and North West Delhi, bypassing Tikri Border to enter Bahadurgarh. It is the first Delhi metro line on standard gauge, as opposed to 5 ft 6 in (1,676 mm) broad gauge, prevalent in the Red, Yellow and Blue Lines.

== History ==
The line was opened in two stages, with the 15.1 km (9.38 mi) Inderlok – Mundka section opening on 3 April 2010 and the 3.5 km (2.17 mi) Kirti Nagar – Ashok Park Main branch line opening on 27 August 2011. Though its route is shorter than other lines, the Green Line serves as a lifeline for Delhiites connecting to the Red and Blue Lines because it covers major commercial and residential areas like Punjabi Bagh, Paschim Vihar, Nangloi and Mundka.

On 6 August 2012, the Union government approved the extension of Delhi Metro from Mundka to Bahadurgarh in Haryana. The 11.18 km (6.95 mi) metro stretch comprises seven stations, with four of them in Delhi and the remaining three in Bahadurgarh – Mundka Industrial Area, Ghevra, Tikri Kalan, Tikri Border, Pandit Shree Ram Sharma (Modern Industrial Estate), Bahadurgarh City (Bus Stand) and Brigadier Hoshiar Singh (City Park). Construction work of this extension began in 2013 and was completed by the second half of 2018 as part of Delhi Metro's Phase III expansion. The inauguration of the Mundka – Bahadurgarh stretch took place on 24 June 2018.

In late October 2019, it was decided to construct steel platforms on the viaduct of the Green Line between Punjabi Bagh and Shivaji Park stations to provide a seamless interchange between the Green Line and Pink Line. Construction began in that year itself and the new halt platform of the Green Line, named Punjabi Bagh West, was thrown open to the public on 29 March 2022 after multiple delays.

The new halt platform of the Green Line is connected by a foot over bridge (FOB), which links with the Punjabi Bagh West station of the Pink Line. The FOB is 212 metres (696 ft) long. The new platforms are 155 metres (509 ft) in length and are connected with the FOB by two extra-large lifts on each platform with a capacity of 26 passengers each as well as staircases.

=== Extension to Indraprastha ===
Under Phase-IV, six new lines covering a length of about 104 km (64.62 mi) were planned to be added to the metro network, out of which the extension of the Green Line would connect Inderlok with Indraprastha, at a length of 12.57 km (7.81 mi). The plans were finalized for implementation by the Government of Delhi in December 2018.

A 12.37 km (7.69 mi) extension of the Green Line with ten stations was approved by the Union Government in March 2024. Construction is expected to begin in 2024, as part of the fourth phase of the Delhi Metro's development, and is slated to be completed by 2029.

As of 11 February 2026, it was decided that the Inderlok-Indraprastha corridor under the Green Line's extension for Phase 4 will be implemented as an extension for the Magenta Line instead, which will bring the total corridor length from Botanical Garden to Inderlok to about 89 km, making it the longest metro line in Delhi. Consequently, the line will form an interchange with itself at Nabi Karim.

== Stations ==
=== Main line ===
Green Line
#	Station name		Phase	Opening	Interchange connection	Station layout	Platform level type
#	English	Hindi	Phase	Opening	Interchange connection	Station layout	Platform level type
1	Inderlok	इंद्रलोक	II	3 April 2010	Red Line; Magenta Line (Phase IV - under construction)	Elevated	Island
2	Ashok Park Main	अशोक पार्क मेन	II	3 April 2010	Green Line	Elevated	Side
3	Punjabi Bagh East	पंजाबी बाग़ पूर्व	II	3 April 2010	None	Elevated	Side
4	Punjabi Bagh West	पंजाबी बाग़ पश्चिम	II	29 March 2022	Pink Line	Elevated	Side
5	Shivaji Park	शिवाजी पार्क	II	3 April 2010	Shakurbasti	Elevated	Side
6	Madipur	मादीपुर	II	3 April 2010	None	Elevated	Side
7	Paschim Vihar East	पश्चिम विहार पूर्व	II	3 April 2010	None	Elevated	Side
8	Paschim Vihar West	पश्चिम विहार पश्चिम	II	3 April 2010	None	Elevated	Side
9	Peeragarhi	पीरागढ़ी	II	3 April 2010	Magenta Line (Phase IV - under construction)	Elevated	Side
10	Udyog Nagar	उद्योग नगर	II	3 April 2010	None	Elevated	Side
11	Maharaja Surajmal Stadium	महाराजा सूरजमल स्टेडियम	II	3 April 2010	None	Elevated	Side
12	Nangloi	नांगलोई	II	3 April 2010	Grey Line Phase V(B) Dhansa Bus Stand	Elevated	Side
13	Nangloi Railway Station	नांगलोई रेलवे स्टेशन	II	3 April 2010	Nangloi	Elevated	Side
14	Rajdhani Park	राजधानी पार्क	II	3 April 2010	None	Elevated	Side
15	Mundka	मुण्डका	II	3 April 2010	None	Elevated	Side
16	Mundka Industrial Area (MIA)	मुण्डका इंडस्ट्रियल एरिया (एमआईए)	III	24 June 2018	None	Elevated	Side
17	Ghevra Metro Station	घेवरा मेट्रो स्टेशन	III	24 June 2018	None	Elevated	Side
18	Tikri Kalan	टीकरी कलाँ	III	24 June 2018	None	Elevated	Side
19	Tikri Border	टीकरी बॉर्डर	III	24 June 2018	None	Elevated	Side
20	Pandit Shree Ram Sharma (Modern Industrial Estate)	पंडित श्री राम शर्मा (मॉर्डन इंडस्ट्रियल एस्टेट)	III	24 June 2018	None	Elevated	Side
21	Bahadurgarh City (Bus Stand)	बहादुरगढ़ सिटी (बस स्टैंड)	III	24 June 2018	None	Elevated	Side
22	Brigadier Hoshiyar Singh (Bahadurgarh City Park)	ब्रिगेडियर होशियार सिंह (बहादुरगढ़ सिटी पार्क)	III	24 June 2018	None	Elevated	Side

=== Branch line ===
Green Line Branch
#	Station name		Phase	Opening	Interchange connection	Station layout	Platform level type
#	English	Hindi	Phase	Opening	Interchange connection	Station layout	Platform level type
1	Ashok Park Main*	अशोक पार्क मेन*	II	3 April 2010	Green Line	Elevated	Side
2	Satguru Ram Singh Marg	सतगुरु राम सिंह मार्ग	II	27 August 2011	Patel Nagar	Elevated	Side
3	Kirti Nagar	कीर्ति नगर	II	27 August 2011	Blue Line	At-grade	Side

== Train info ==
Green Line
Rakes	Mitsubishi	Hyundai Rotem	BEML
Train length	4		
Train gauge	1,435 mm (4 ft 8 1/2 in) standard gauge		
Electrification	25 kV 50 Hz AC (nominal) from overhead catenary		
Train's maximum speed	100 km/h		
Train operation	Inderlok - Mundka Kirti Nagar - Brig. Hoshiyar Singh		

== Infrastructure ==
The Green Line is equipped with Bombardier CITYFLO 350 signalling.

=== Rolling stock ===
The Green Line uses standard-gauge trains that were manufactured by a consortium of Mitsubishi, Hyundai Rotem, and BEML. A total of 196 cars for the Green Line and the Violet Line were ordered in both four-car configurations (46 trains) and six-car configurations (two trains). One train was manufactured at Changwon in South Korea, while the remaining trains were manufactured at BEML's facility in Bangalore. The width of these trains is 2.9 meters as compared to 3.2 meters on broad gauge trains.

== Future extensions ==
- Delhi: Within Delhi it will be extended to include the following.
  - Central Vista Loop Line: As part of the Central Vista Redevelopment Project, this underground line with four stations, including the existing Central Secretariat metro station interchange of existing Yellow Line and Violet Line, by connecting the new government buildings coming up as part of the Central Vista Redevelopment project.
- Rohtak: Green Line (Delhi Metro) will be extended from existing metro station in Bahadurgarh to Rohtak in the following phases:
  - Delhi Green Line Metro: Bahadurgarh to Asaudha extension: The Bahadurgarh (Brigadier Hoshiyar Singh metro station) to Asaudha extension to Asaudha railway station has been approved, where it will interchange with Haryana Orbital Rail Corridor at Asaudha railway station. From the existing Brigadier Hoshiar Singh metro station, it will extended east to Western Peripheral Expressway (WPE) with 5 new stations, namely Sankhol, Udhyog Vihar Sector 16 (near Somany Ceramics and Parle-G biscuit factory), HSIDC Sector 17, Jakhoda (eastern intersection of Delhi Road and Bahadurgarh Southern Bypass), HPCL Plant, and Asaudha near WPE (integrate with Asaudha railway station of Delhi-Rohtak-Hisar line and Haryana Orbital Rail Corridor (HORC)). Physical survey was completed in November 2025, DPR will be ready in 6 months by May 2026, after which tenders will be issued once the budget is approved.
  - Delhi Green Line Metro: Asaudha to Rohtak extension: It will be further extended from Asaudha to Rohtak city.

== See also ==
- Delhi Suburban Railway
- List of metro systems
- List of rapid transit systems
- National Capital Region Transport Corporation
- Rapid transit in India
- Transport in Delhi
