= Mundka Industrial Area metro station =

Metro station in Delhi, India

Mundka Industrial Area

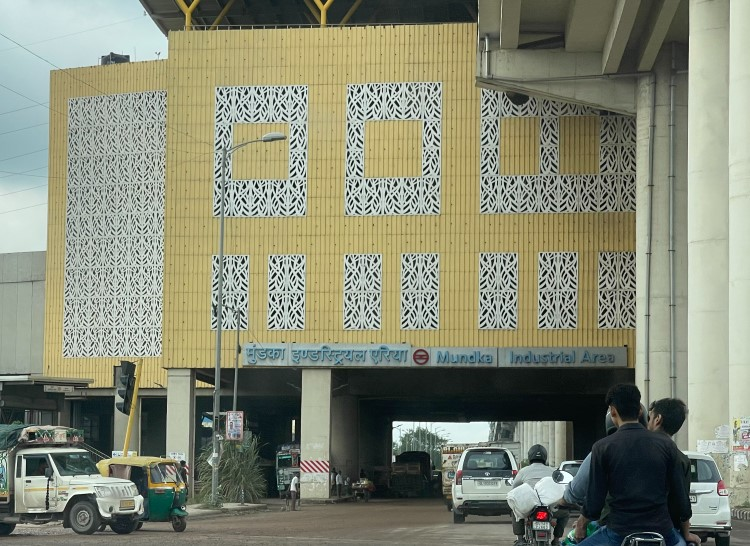

General information
- Location: Rohtak-Bahadurgarh Road, Mundka Industrial Area, Mundka, North West Delhi, Delhi, 110041
- Coordinates: 28°41′00″N 77°01′03″E
- System: Delhi Metro station
- Owner: Delhi Metro Rail Corporation
- Line: Green Line
- Platforms: Side platform; Platform-1 → Brigadier Hoshiyar Singh; Platform-2 → Inderlok / Kirti Nagar
- Tracks: 2

Construction
- Structure type: Elevated
- Platform levels: 2
- Accessible: Yes

Other information
- Station code: MIAA

History
- Opened: 24 June 2018; 8 years ago
- Electrified: 25 kV 50 Hz AC through overhead catenary

Services
Preceding station	Delhi Metro	Following station
Ghevra towards Brigadier Hoshiyar Singh	Green Line	Mundka towards Inderlok or Kirti Nagar
Route map
Location

Mundka Industrial Area is an elevated metro station on the Green Line of the Delhi Metro and is located in Mundka Industrial Area, Mundka in the North West Delhi district of Delhi. The station is currently and is opened on 24 June 2018.

== Station layout ==
L2	Side platform | Doors will open on the left
L2	Platform 2 Eastbound	Towards → Inderlok / Kirti Nagar; Next Station: Mundka
L2	Platform 1 Westbound	Towards ← Brigadier Hoshiyar Singh; Next Station: Ghevra
L2	Side platform | Doors will open on the left
L1	Concourse	Fare control, station agent, Metro Card vending machines, crossover
G	Street Level	Exit/Entrance

== Facilities ==
The available ATMs at Mundka Industrial Area metro station belong to HDFC Bank and Yes Bank.

== See also ==
- List of Delhi Metro stations
- Transport in Delhi
- Delhi Metro Rail Corporation
- Delhi Suburban Railway
- List of rapid transit systems in India
