= Nangloi metro station =

Metro station in Delhi, India

Nangloi नांगलोई

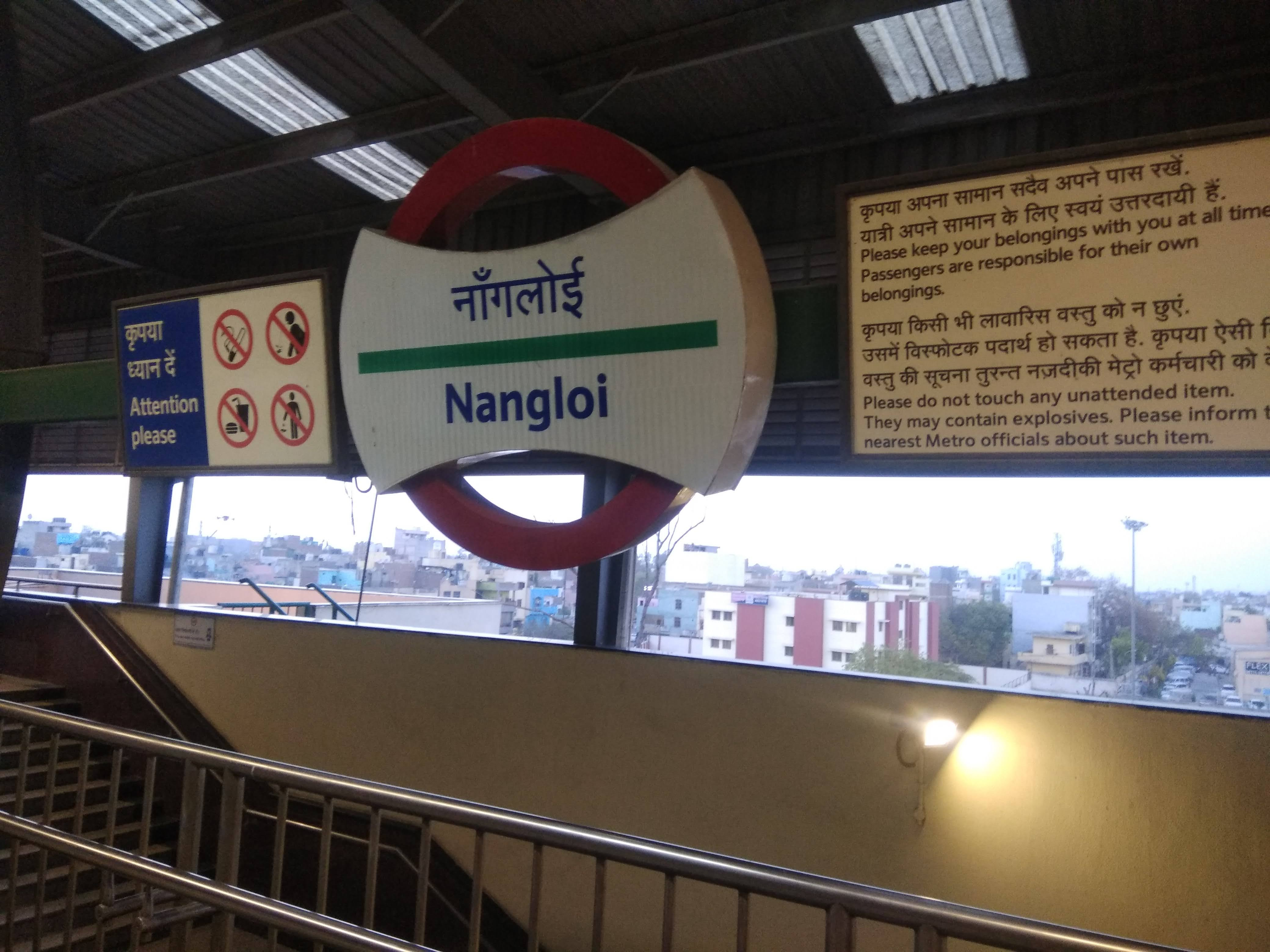

General information
- Location: Kirari Extension 2, JJ Colony No 1, Nangloi, New Delhi, Delhi 110041
- Coordinates: 28°40′57″N 77°03′53″E
- System: Delhi Metro station
- Owner: Delhi Metro Rail Corporation
- Line: Green Line Grey Line (Proposed)
- Platforms: Side platform; Platform-1 → Brigadier Hoshiyar Singh; Platform-2 → Inderlok / Kirti Nagar
- Tracks: 2

Construction
- Structure type: Elevated
- Platform levels: 2
- Parking: Available
- Accessible: Yes

Other information
- Station code: NNOI

History
- Opened: 2 April 2010; 16 years ago
- Electrified: 25 kV 50 Hz AC through overhead catenary

Passengers
- Jan 2015: 14,987 /day 464,583/ Month average

Services
Preceding station	Delhi Metro	Following station
Nangloi Railway Station towards Brigadier Hoshiyar Singh	Green Line	Maharaja Surajmal Stadium towards Inderlok or Kirti Nagar
Route map
Location

Nangloi is a station on the Green Line of the Delhi Metro and is located in the West Delhi district of Delhi. It is an elevated station and was inaugurated on 2 April 2010.

== Station layout ==
L2	Side platform | Doors will open on the left
L2	Platform 2 Eastbound	Towards → Inderlok / Kirti Nagar; Next Station: Maharaja Surajmal Stadium
L2	Platform 1 Westbound	Towards ← Brigadier Hoshiyar Singh; Next Station: Nangloi Railway Station
L2	Side platform | Doors will open on the left
L1	Concourse	Fare control, station agent, Metro Card vending machines, crossover
G	Street level	Exit/Entrance

== See also ==
- List of Delhi Metro stations
- Transport in Delhi
- Delhi Metro Rail Corporation
- Delhi Suburban Railway
- List of rapid transit systems in India
