= Mundka =

- Town
- Location in India Mundka (India)
- Coordinates: 28.67944°N 77.02835°E
- Country: Indian Flag India
- State: Delhi
- District: West Delhi

Government
  - Member of Parliament, Lok Sabha: Yogender Chandoliya
  - Member of the Legislative Assembly (India): Gajender Drall

Population (2001)
  - Total: 43,898

Languages
  - Spoken: Hindi, Haryanvi
  - Official: Hindi, English
- Time zone: UTC+5:30 (IST)
- PIN: 110041
- Telephone code: 2834
- Sex ratio: 1.27 ♂/♀

Mundka is a census town and village in the West Delhi district of Delhi. It is known for its historical, industrial and infrastructural significance. The name is believed to have originated from the Sanskrit word "Muṇḍa" (मुण्ड), meaning "head", with local folklore linking it to the beheading of Shishupala by Krishna, where his head allegedly fell into Shishupal or Shishuwala pond. It also holds cultural importance with landmarks like the Dada Bhairav Temple. Its neighbouring villages are Nangloi Jat, Bakkarwala, Tikri Kalan, Rani Khera (Delhi), Rasoolpur and Ghevra.

It is the birthplace and village of former Chief Minister of Delhi, the late Dr. Sahib Singh Verma and his son Parvesh Verma. The current MLA of the Mundka constituency is Gajender Drall, a member of the Bharatiya Janata Party (BJP). Yogender Chandoliya is the current Member of Parliament, Lok Sabha representing the North West Delhi Lok Sabha constituency, which includes the Mundka area. Politically, it is an active constituency in Delhi’s governance.

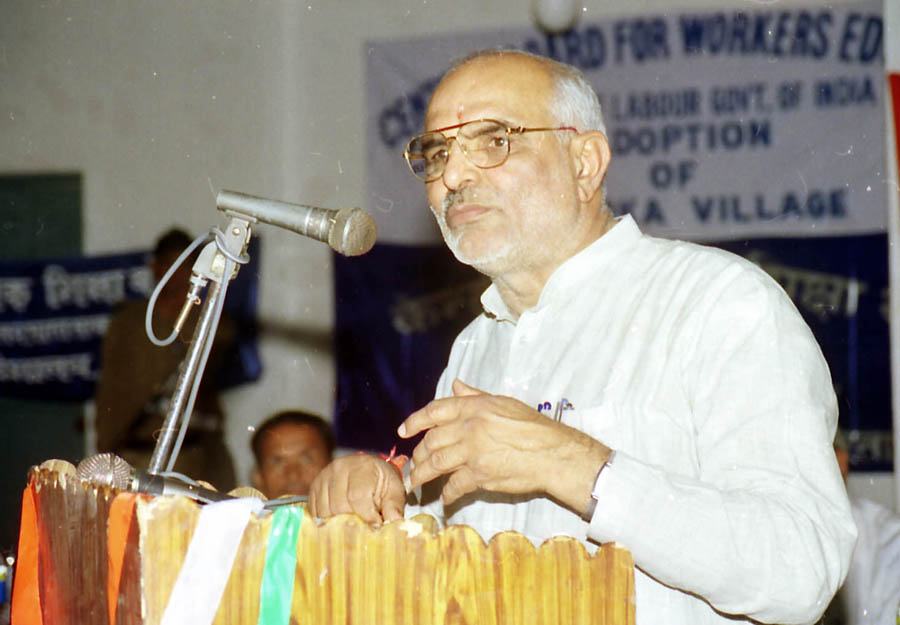
Dr. Sahib Singh Verma

== History ==
Mundka was primarily an agricultural village during British Raj, with farming being the main livelihood for its residents. The fertile lands of the region were used for growing crops such as wheat, barley, and millet. The British administration introduced land revenue systems, such as the Permanent Settlement or Ryotwari system in parts of India, impacting rural areas like Mundka. Land taxes imposed on farmers often caused economic strain. The British period saw the introduction of railways and road networks across India. Mundka benefited from its proximity to Delhi, the administrative center. The development of railway lines (such as the Delhi-Rohtak line) in the vicinity connected rural areas to urban centers, influencing trade and mobility. Mundka Police Station (now Nangloi) was established on October 29, 1861, making it one of the earliest police stations in Delhi. This establishment followed the enactment of the Indian Police Act of 1861 by the British administration, which aimed to structure and regulate policing across India. The first five police stations inaugurated in Delhi under this act were Sadar Bazar, Sabzi Mandi, Mehrauli, Kotwali and Mundka.

== Etymology ==
The name is believed to have originated from the Sanskrit word muṇḍa (मुण्ड), meaning "head", with local folklore linking it to the beheading of Shishupala by Krishna, where his head allegedly fell into Shishupal Pond in Mundka.

== Dada Bhairav (Bharo) Temple ==
Dada Bhairav Temple is a well-known temple in the village Dada Bhairav is regarded as the Kuladevata (ancestral deity) of the people of Mundka. Many local families have deep-rooted faith in Dada Bhairav and consider him their protector and guiding force. The temple plays a vital role in their religious and cultural traditions, with devotees offering prayers for prosperity, protection, and the well-being of their families. During the annual Bhandara (community kitchen) at Dada Bhairav Temple, free food is distributed to all devotees as part of a sacred tradition. After his electoral victory in 2025, Parvesh Verma visited his ancestral village of Mundka and offered prayers at the Dada Bhairav Temple.

== Demographics ==
According to the 2011 India census, Mundka had a population of 57,590. Males constituted 56% of the population and females 44%. Mundka had an average literacy rate of 78%, higher than the national average of 74.04%. Male literacy was 75%, and female literacy was 65%. At that time, 16% of the population was under six years of age. The village falls under the 8th Assembly of Delhi.

== Transportation ==
=== Metro connectivity (DMRC) ===
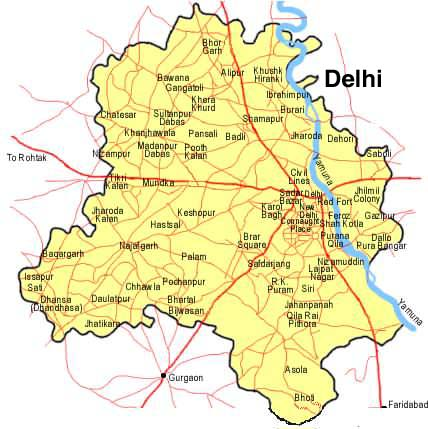
Map of Delhi showing location of Mundka

The Mundka station of Delhi Metro was inaugurated on 2 April 2010. The 15.1 km (9.4 mi) corridor, from Mundka to Inderlok, serves thousands of people daily. The corridor, also called the Green Line, connects Inderlok (on Dilshad Garden – Rithala line) and Kirti Nagar (on Dwarka – Noida City Centre / Vaishali line). It is 22 km from Connaught place (Delhi) and 10 km from Bahadurgarh (Haryana). Mundka Industrial Area metro station, a major hub for factories and warehouses in West Delhi.

=== Railway connectivity (Indian Railways) ===
Mundka railway station, located in Delhi, was built during the British era as part of the Delhi-Rohtak railway line. The Delhi-Rohtak railway line was established in the late 19th century, around 1876–1884, under the British Indian Railways. Mundka station primarily served as a small stop for local trains and freight transport. Later, with urban expansion, it became part of the Delhi Suburban Railway network. Now, Mundka Railway Station, designated by the station code MQC, is situated in the West Delhi district of Delhi, India. It falls under the jurisdiction of the Northern Railway zone of Indian Railways.

=== Road connectivity ===
Mundka enjoys good road connectivity with major parts of Delhi and Haryana. The presence of National Highway 9 (India) and Outer Ring Road makes it a well-connected locality for industrial and residential purposes. NH-9 (Rohtak Road), previously known as NH-10, is a vital highway that runs through Mundka. It connects Delhi to Rohtak, Hisar, and other parts of Haryana, Punjab, and Rajasthan. This road is a key route for freight transportation and daily commuters. The Outer Ring Road, also part of NH-48, is one of the most critical roads in Delhi. It provides seamless connectivity from Mundka to other parts of Delhi such as Punjabi Bagh, Pitampura, and Dhaula Kuan. Opened in 2024 and 2025 respectively, the Dwarka Expressway and Urban Extension Road-II helped enhance connectivity to Dwarka, Gurugram, and IGI Airport.

=== Bus connectivity (DTC) ===
Mundka has strong bus connectivity with various parts of Delhi and neighboring areas like Bahadurgarh, Nangloi, Peeragarhi, Punjabi Bagh, Dwarka, and Connaught Place. Delhi Transport Corporation (DTC) and private buses operate regularly, ensuring easy and affordable travel for commuters.

| 114STL | Mundka - New Delhi Railway Station | Nangloi, Peeragarhi, Punjabi Bagh |
| 123 | Mundka - Uttam Nagar Terminal | Nangloi, Paschim Vihar, Janakpuri |
| 123A | Mundka - Najafgarh | Tikri Kalan, Dwarka Mor |
| 969 | Mundka - Rohini Sector 22 | Peeragarhi, Mangolpuri, Sultanpuri |
| RTP | Mundka - Bahadurgarh | Tikri Kalan, Ashoda, Haryana Border |
| 920 | Mundka - ISBT Kashmere Gate | Karol Bagh, Red Fort, Mori Gate |
| TMS (Ring Road Bus) | Circular Route around Delhi | Outer Ring Road, Dhaula Kuan, AIIMS |

Most of these buses run every 15–30 minutes, ensuring convenient transport.

== Drainage ==
Mundka, like many parts of West Delhi, struggles with poor drainage and waterlogging issues, especially during the monsoon season. Rapid industrialization and construction have led to encroachment on natural drainage paths. Many areas still lack a well-connected drainage network, leading to water stagnation. Garbage dumping and lack of regular cleaning cause drains to overflow during rains. Waterlogging causes roads to flood often, making commuting difficult particularly along the Rohtak Road stretch between Nangloi Metro Station and Tikri Border. This section has been notorious for severe waterlogging and traffic congestion, adversely affecting daily commuters and residents in areas like Nangloi, Mundka, Ghevra, and Tikri.

== 2022 fire ==
The devastating 2022 Delhi fire took place on May 13, 2022, in a four-story commercial building near Mundka metro station. The fire, which is believed to have been caused by a short circuit, originated on the first floor, where a CCTV and router manufacturing company was operating. The flames spread rapidly, trapping workers and office employees inside the building, leading to a significant loss of life and injuries.

== Notable people ==
- Parvesh Verma (born 1977), politician

== See also ==
- Sahib Singh Verma
- Delhi Metro
- West Delhi district
- 2022 Delhi fire
- Delhi Legislative Assembly
