= Pandit Shree Ram Sharma metro station =

Metro station in Delhi, India

Pandit Shree Ram Sharma

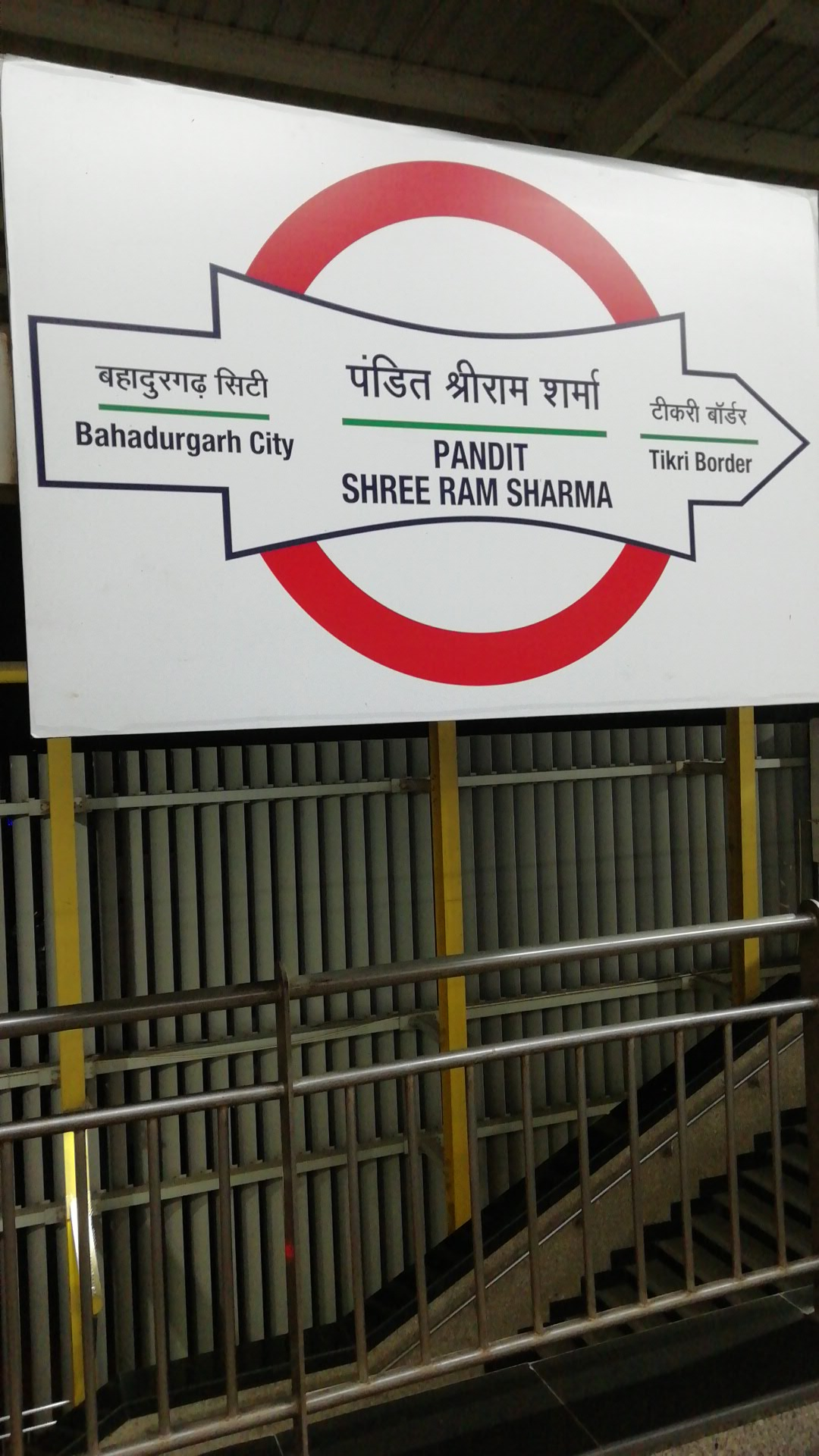

General information
- Location: NH-9, Rohtak Road, Bahadurgarh Border, Bahadurgarh, Jhajjar district, Haryana
- Coordinates: 28°41′21″N 76°57′05″E
- System: Delhi Metro station
- Owner: Delhi Metro Rail Corporation
- Line: Green Line
- Platforms: Side platform; Platform-1 → Brigadier Hoshiyar Singh; Platform-2 → Inderlok / Kirti Nagar
- Tracks: 2

Construction
- Structure type: Elevated
- Platform levels: 2
- Parking: Available
- Accessible: Yes

Other information
- Station code: MIEE

History
- Opened: 24 June 2018; 8 years ago
- Electrified: 25 kV 50 Hz AC through overhead catenary
- Former names: Modern Industrial Estate

Services
Preceding station	Delhi Metro	Following station
Bahadurgarh City towards Brigadier Hoshiyar Singh	Green Line	Tikri Border towards Inderlok or Kirti Nagar
Route map
Location

Pandit Shree Ram Sharma metro station (formerly known as Modern Industrial Estate metro station) is a station on the Green Line of the Delhi Metro and is located in Bahadurgarh Border in the Jhajjar district of Haryana. It is an elevated station and opened on 24 June 2018.

== Etymology ==
The station is named after the Indian freedom activist Pandit Shree Ram Sharma of Bahadurgarh (not to be confused with another freedom activist born in Uttar Pradesh Shriram Sharma), who was born on 1st October in Sarai Aurangabad village near sector-2 on Bahadurgarh–Beri Road 6 km west of this eponymous metro station. He was a follower of Mahatma Gandhi, participated in Gandhi's all five Satyagrahas during Indian independence movement, and launched the Urdu newspaper "Haryana Tilak" in 1923.

== Station layout ==
L2	Side platform | Doors will open on the left
L2	Platform 2 Eastbound	Towards → Inderlok / Kirti Nagar; Next Station: Tikri Border
L2	Platform 1 Westbound	Towards ← Brigadier Hoshiyar Singh; Next Station: Bahadurgarh City
L2	Side platform | Doors will open on the left
L1	Concourse	Fare control, station agent, Metro Card vending machines, crossover
G	Street level	Exit/Entrance

== Facilities ==
List of available ATM at Modern Industrial Estate metro station are

== Exits ==
Ground Level North exit has the car parking lot.

== Connectivity ==
- Road: This metro station, on the Hisar-Delhi-Pithoragarh NH-9, is 1.5 north of the Bahadurgarh Bus Stand which lies on Bahadurgarh Bypass. Buses running on NH-9 from Delhi to Rohtak, Hansi, Hisar, Fatehabad, Sirsa, Dabwali, Abohar and Fazilka also stop there if signaled to do so.
- Orbital railway: Once Haryana Orbital Rail Corridor is completed, this metro station will be connected to the Asaudha railway station via the planned adjacent Asaudha metro station.
- Metro expansion: There is also proposal to link this metro station to the existing Najafgarh metro station via a new line through Bahadurgarh Bus Stand, Bahadurgarh Bypass, Jharoda Kalan, CRPF Camp, Kali Piau, New Anaj Mandi Najafgarh, etc.

== See also ==
- List of Delhi Metro stations
- Transport in Delhi
- Delhi Metro Rail Corporation
- Delhi Suburban Railway
- List of rapid transit systems in India
