= Tikri =

Tikri may refer to:

India

- Tikri, Amethi, a village in Uttar Pradesh, India
- Tikri, Gurgaon, a village in Haryana, India
- Tikri Kalan, a village in North West Delhi, Delhi, India
  - Tikri Border metro station
  - Tikri Kalan metro station
- Tikri Khurd, a village in Delhi, India
- Tikri, Tundla, a village in Uttar Pradesh, India
- Tikri, Uttar Pradesh, in India

Pakistan

- Tikri, Pakistan

== See also ==
- Tikra railway station, West Bengal, India
