= Punjabi Bagh metro station =

Metro station in Delhi, India

Punjabi Bagh

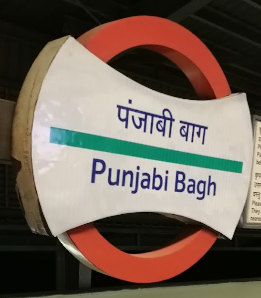
- Punjabi Bagh metro station

General information
- Location: Rohtak Rd, Railway Colony, East Punjabi Bagh, Punjabi Bagh, New Delhi,110026
- Coordinates: 28°40′23″N 77°08′46″E
- System: Delhi Metro station
- Owner: Delhi Metro
- Line: Green Line
- Platforms: Side platform; Platform-1 → Brigadier Hoshiyar Singh; Platform-2 → Inderlok / Kirti Nagar
- Tracks: 2

Construction
- Structure type: Elevated
- Platform levels: 2
- Parking: Available
- Accessible: Yes

Other information
- Station code: PBGA

History
- Opened: 2 April 2010; 16 years ago
- Electrified: 25 kV 50 Hz AC through overhead catenary

Passengers
- Jan 2015: 2,859 /day 88,644/ Month average

Services
Preceding station	Delhi Metro	Following station
Punjabi Bagh West towards Brigadier Hoshiyar Singh	Green Line	Ashok Park Main towards Inderlok or Kirti Nagar
Route map
Location

The Punjabi Bagh Metro station on the Green Line of the Delhi Metro and is located in Punjabi Bagh in the West Delhi district of Delhi. It is an elevated station with parking facilities and was inaugurated on 2 April 2010.

== Station layout ==
L2	Side platform | Doors will open on the left
L2	Platform 2 Eastbound	Towards → Inderlok / Kirti Nagar; Next Station: Ashok Park Main
L2	Platform 1 Westbound	Towards ← Brigadier Hoshiyar Singh; Next Station: Punjabi Bagh West Change at the next station for Pink Line
L2	Side platform | Doors will open on the left
L1	Concourse	Fare control, station agent, Metro Card vending machines, crossover
G	Street level	Exit/Entrance

== Facilities ==
There are HDFC Bank and Canara Bank ATMs at Punjabi Bagh East metro station.

== See also ==
- List of Delhi Metro stations
- Transport in Delhi
- Delhi Metro Rail Corporation
- Delhi Suburban Railway
- List of rapid transit systems in India
