= Shivaji Park metro station =

Metro station in New Delhi, India

Shivaji Park

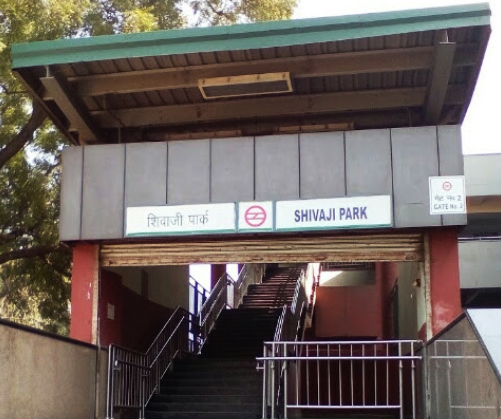
- Shivaji Park metro station

General information
- Location: Rohtak Rd, Block S, Shivaji Park, Punjabi Bagh, New Delhi,110026
- Coordinates: 28°40′30″N 77°07′49″E
- System: Delhi Metro station
- Owner: Delhi Metro
- Line: Green Line
- Platforms: Side platform; Platform-1 → Brigadier Hoshiyar Singh; Platform-2 → Inderlok / Kirti Nagar
- Tracks: 2
- Connections: Shakurbasti

Construction
- Structure type: Elevated
- Platform levels: 2
- Parking: Available
- Accessible: Yes

Other information
- Station code: SHVP

History
- Opened: 2 April 2010; 16 years ago
- Electrified: 25 kV 50 Hz AC through overhead catenary

Passengers
- Jan 2015: 4,480 /day 138,876/ Month average

Services
Preceding station	Delhi Metro	Following station
Madipur towards Brigadier Hoshiyar Singh	Green Line	Punjabi Bagh West towards Inderlok or Kirti Nagar
Route map
Location

Shivaji Park is a station on the Green Line of the Delhi Metro and is located in the West Delhi district of Delhi. It is an elevated station with parking facilities and was inaugurated on 2 April 2010. Passengers for Shivaji Park, Central Market, Punjabi Bagh West and Punjabi Bagh Extension should get down here for these nearby areas.

== Station layout ==
L2	Side platform | Doors will open on the left
L2	Platform 2 Eastbound	Towards → Inderlok / Kirti Nagar; Next Station: Punjabi Bagh West Change at the next station for Pink Line
L2	Platform 1 Westbound	Towards ← Brigadier Hoshiyar Singh; Next Station: Madipur
L2	Side platform | Doors will open on the left
L1	Concourse	Fare control, station agent, Metro Card vending machines, crossover
G	Street level	Exit/Entrance

== Facilities ==
Available ATMs at Shivaji Park metro station are HDFC Bank and Canara Bank

== See also ==
- List of Delhi Metro stations
- Transport in Delhi
- Delhi Metro Rail Corporation
- Delhi Suburban Railway
- List of rapid transit systems in India
