= Ashok Park Main metro station =

Metro station in Delhi, India

Ashok Park Main

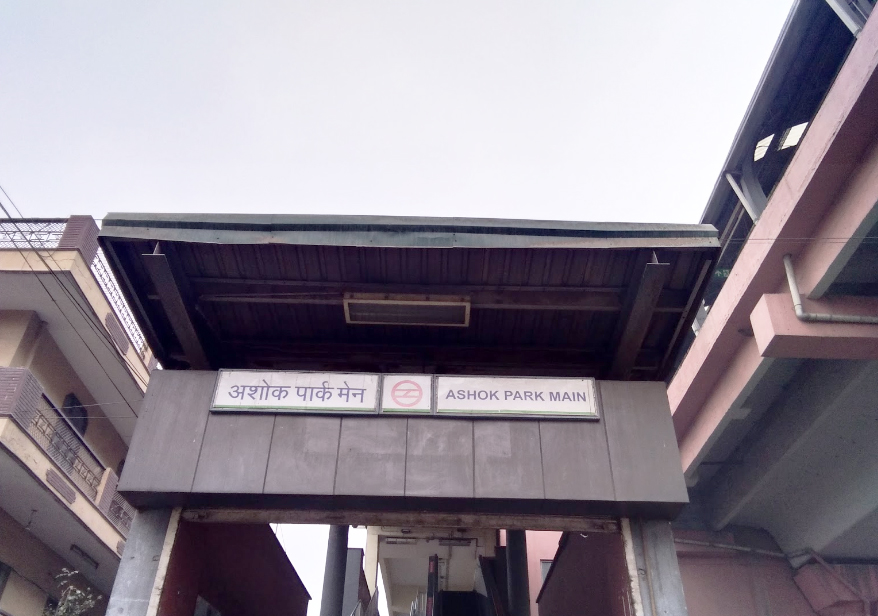
- Ashok Park Main metro station

General information
- Location: Rohtak Rd, Manohar Park, Block D, East Punjabi Bagh, New Delhi, 110026
- Coordinates: 28°40′18″N 77°09′18″E
- System: Delhi Metro station
- Owner: Delhi Metro
- Line: Green Line
- Platforms: Side platform; Platform-1 → Brigadier Hoshiyar Singh; Platform-2 → Inderlok / Kirti Nagar
- Tracks: 2

Construction
- Structure type: Elevated
- Platform levels: 2
- Accessible: Yes

Other information
- Station code: APMN

History
- Opened: 2 April 2010; 16 years ago
- Electrified: 25 kV 50 Hz AC through overhead catenary

Passengers
- Jan 2015: 4,027 /day 124,842/ Month average

Services
Preceding station	Delhi Metro	Following station
Punjabi Bagh towards Brigadier Hoshiyar Singh	Green Line	Inderlok Terminus
Punjabi Bagh towards Brigadier Hoshiyar Singh	Green Line	Satguru Ram Singh Marg towards Kirti Nagar
Route map
Location

Ashok Park Main metro station is an elevated station on the Green Line of the Delhi Metro, located in West Delhi. It was inaugurated on 2 April 2010 as part of the Inderlok–Mundka corridor.

A 3.3 km (2.1 mi) branch of the Green Line connecting Ashok Park Main to Kirti Nagar was opened on 27 August 2011. Ashok Park Main serves as an interchange between the two branches of the Green Line, towards Inderlok and Kirti Nagar.

== Station layout ==
L2	Side platform | Doors will open on the left
L2	Platform 2 Eastbound	Towards → Inderlok Change at the next station for Red Line; Towards → Kirti Nagar; Next Station: Satguru Ram Singh Marg
L2	Platform 1 Westbound	Towards ← Brigadier Hoshiyar Singh; Next Station: Punjabi Bagh
L2	Side platform | Doors will open on the left
L1	Concourse	Fare control, station agent, Metro Card vending machines, crossover
G	Street level	Exit/Entrance

== Facilities ==
An ATM is available at Ashok Park Main metro station.

== Gallery ==
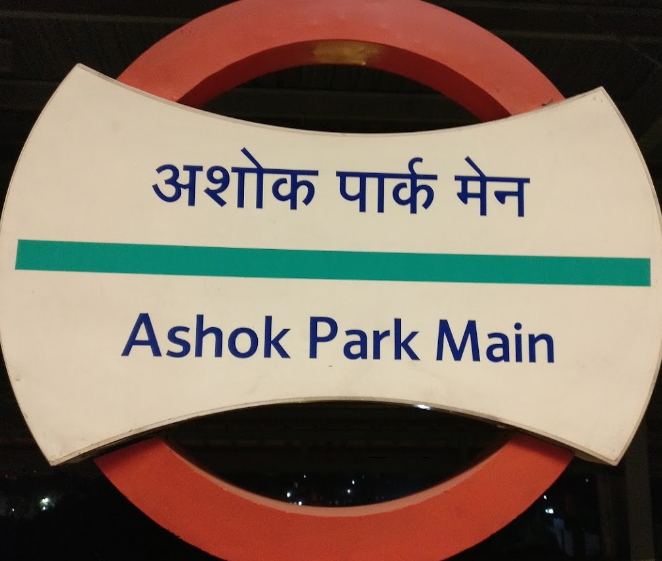
Station Name Display

== See also ==
- List of Delhi Metro stations
- Transport in Delhi
- Delhi Metro Rail Corporation
- Delhi Suburban Railway
- List of rapid transit systems in India
