= Bahadurgarh City metro station =

Metro station in Delhi, India

Bahadurgarh City बहादुरगढ़ सिटी

General information
- Location: NH-9, Rohtak Road, Bahadurgarh City, Jhajjar district, Haryana
- Coordinates: 28°41′27″N 76°56′06″E
- System: Delhi Metro station
- Owner: Delhi Metro Rail Corporation
- Line: Green Line
- Platforms: Side platform; Platform-1 → Brigadier Hoshiyar Singh; Platform-2 → Inderlok / Kirti Nagar
- Tracks: 2

Construction
- Structure type: Elevated
- Platform levels: 2
- Accessible: Yes

Other information
- Station code: BUSS

History
- Opened: 24 June 2018; 8 years ago
- Electrified: 25 kV 50 Hz AC through overhead catenary
- Former names: Bus Stand metro station

Services
Preceding station	Delhi Metro	Following station
Brigadier Hoshiyar Singh Terminus	Green Line	Pandit Shree Ram Sharma towards Inderlok or Kirti Nagar
Route map
Location

Bahadurgarh City Metro Station (formerly known as Bus Stand metro station) is a station on the Green Line of the Delhi Metro and is located in the Bahadurgarh City in Jhajjar district of Haryana. It is an elevated station and opened on 24 June 2018.

== Station layout ==
L2	Side platform | Doors will open on the left
L2	Platform 2 Eastbound	Towards → Inderlok / Kirti Nagar; Next Station: Pandit Shree Ram Sharma
L2	Platform 1 Westbound	Towards ← Brigadier Hoshiyar Singh
L2	Side platform | Doors will open on the left
L1	Concourse	Fare control, station agent, Metro Card vending machines, crossover
G	Street Level	Exit/Entrance

== Facilities ==
List of available ATM at Bus Stand metro station are

== See also ==
- List of Delhi Metro stations
- Transport in Delhi
- Delhi Metro Rail Corporation
- Delhi Suburban Railway
- List of rapid transit systems in India
