= Satguru Ram Singh Marg metro station =

Metro station in Delhi, India

Satguru Ram Singh Marg

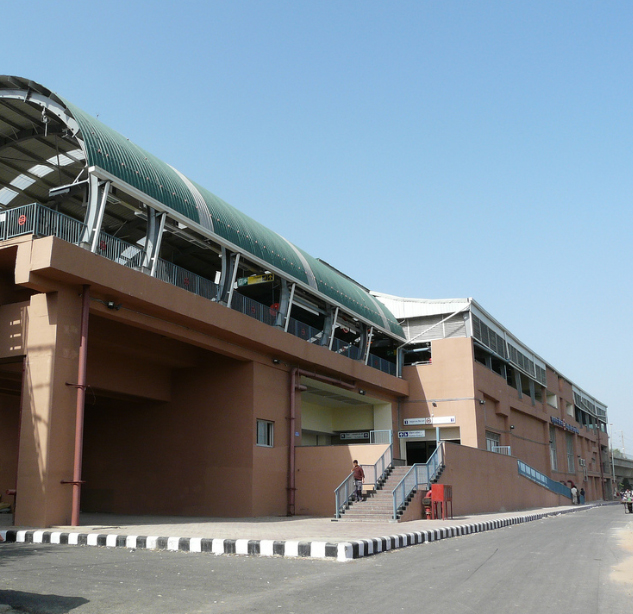
- Satguru Ram Singh Marg metro station

General information
- Coordinates: 28°39′43″N 77°09′28″E
- System: Delhi Metro station
- Owner: Delhi Metro
- Operator: Delhi Metro Rail Corporation (DMRC)
- Line: Green Line
- Platforms: Side platform; Platform-1 → Brigadier Hoshiyar Singh; Platform-2 → Kirti Nagar
- Tracks: 2
- Connections: Patel Nagar

Construction
- Parking: No
- Accessible: Yes

Other information
- Station code: SRSM

History
- Opened: 27 August 2011; 15 years ago

Services
Preceding station	Delhi Metro	Following station
Ashok Park Main towards Brigadier Hoshiyar Singh	Green Line	Kirti Nagar Terminus
Route map
Location

Satguru Ram Singh Marg is an elevated metro station on the Green Line of the Delhi Metro, located in West Delhi. It commenced operations on 27 August 2011, as part of the 3.3 kilometres (2.1 mi) Kirti Nagar–Ashok Park Main section of the line. The station provides access to Patel Nagar railway station, which is part of the Indian Railways' Ring Railway network, connecting the suburban railway system with the Delhi Metro.

The elevated section between Satguru Ram Singh Marg and Ashok Park Main stations features a 262 metres (860 ft) radius curve, which was reported to be the sharpest curve on the Delhi Metro network at the time of its construction. The 518 metres (1,699 ft) long curve was built to navigate the densely populated area while avoiding demolition of existing buildings and residential complexes.

== Station layout ==
L2	Side platform | Doors will open on the left
L2	Platform 2 Eastbound	Towards → Kirti Nagar Change at the next station for Blue Line
L2	Platform 1 Westbound	Towards ← Brigadier Hoshiyar Singh; Next Station: Ashok Park Main
L2	Side platform | Doors will open on the left
L1	Concourse	Fare control, station agent, Metro Card vending machines, crossover
G	Street level	Exit/Entrance
