= Kanjhawala =

- Sub Urban
- Location in India
- Coordinates: 28.72674°N 77.00248°E
- Country: India
- State: Delhi
- District: North West Delhi

Population (2011)
  - Total: 10,331

Languages
  - Official: Hindi, English
  - Mother Tongue: Haryanvi
- Time zone: UTC+5:30 (IST)
- Postal code: 110081

Kanjhawala is the administrative headquarters of the North West Delhi district of Delhi, India. It is also a Sub-division of the North-West Delhi district.

== Demographics ==
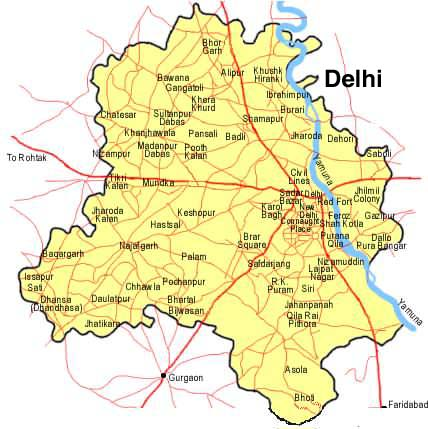
Map of Delhi showing location of Kanjhawala

Kanjhawala had population of 10,331 of which 5,529 are males while 4,802 are females as per report released by Census India 2011.

The population of children ages 0-6 is 1,344, which is 13.01% of total population of Kanjhawala (CT). In Kanjhawala Census Town, the female sex ratio is 869 against state average of 868. Moreover, the child sex ratio in Kanjhawala is around 826, compared to Delhi state average of 871. The literacy rate of Kanjhawala city is 83% lower than the state average of 86.21%. In Kanjhawala, male literacy is around 90.07% while the female literacy is 75%.

People from every religion and caste are now part of this village, which is the center of four industrial areas: Bawana, Mundka, Rani Khera (Delhi), and Bahadurgarh. Also Kanjhawala now boasts of its own industrial area. The District commissioner (DC), Sub-Divisional Magistrate's Office and the Revenue Court for northwest Delhi are all situated in Kanjhawala on main road MDR-8.

The most common language spoken is Haryanvi, along with Hindi.

== Geography ==
The Mahabharat Kalin Khandav Prasth Van is situated 1 km away from Kanjhawala village in Ladpur village area, which is now known as Dada Pobhara.
