= Mundka metro station =

Metro station in Delhi, India

Mundka मुंडका

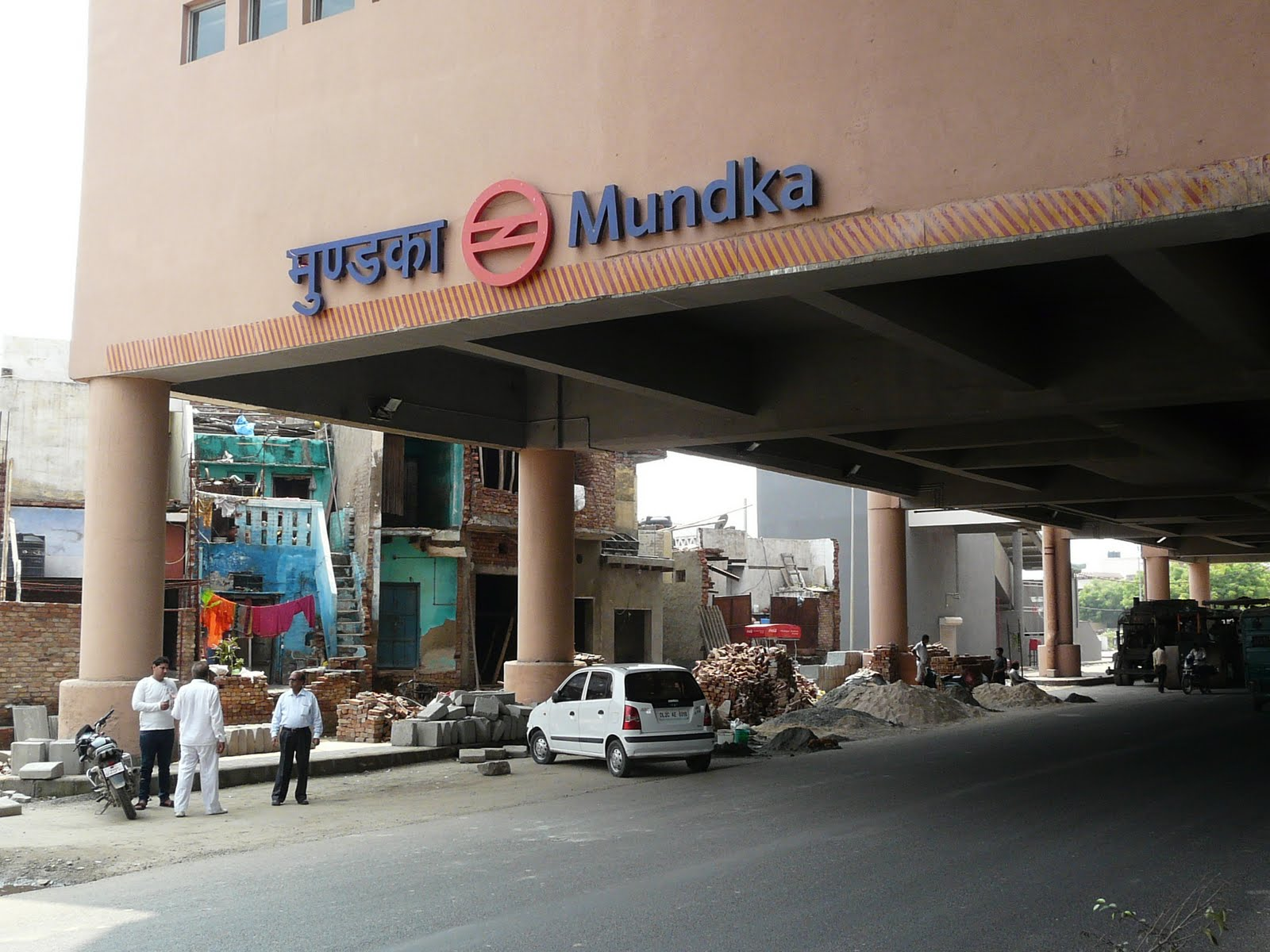

General information
- Location: NH 10, Rohtak Road, Mundka Village, Mundka, North West Delhi, Delhi, 110041
- Coordinates: 28°40′57″N 77°01′50″E
- System: Delhi Metro station
- Owner: Delhi Metro
- Operator: Delhi Metro Rail Corporation (DMRC)
- Line: Green Line
- Platforms: Side platform; Platform-1 → Brigadier Hoshiyar Singh; Platform-2 → Inderlok / Kirti Nagar
- Tracks: 3

Construction
- Structure type: Elevated, Double-track
- Platform levels: 2
- Parking: Available
- Accessible: Yes

Other information
- Status: Staffed, Operational
- Station code: MUDK

History
- Opened: 2 April 2010; 16 years ago
- Electrified: 25 kV 50 Hz AC through overhead catenary

Passengers
- Jan 2015: 10,929/day 338,807/ Month average

Services
Preceding station	Delhi Metro	Following station
Mundka Industrial Area towards Brigadier Hoshiyar Singh	Green Line	Rajdhani Park towards Inderlok or Kirti Nagar
Route map
Location

Mundka is a station on the Green Line of the Delhi Metro. It is an elevated station and was inaugurated on 2 April 2010. The station is located in the Mundka Village locality of North West Delhi district, Delhi. It was the terminal station of the Green Line till 23 June 2018.

== Station layout ==
L2	Side platform | Doors will open on the left
L2	Platform 2 Eastbound	Towards → Inderlok / Kirti Nagar; Next Station: Rajdhani Park
L2	Platform 1 Westbound	Towards ← Brigadier Hoshiyar Singh; Next Station: Mundka Industrial Area
L2	Side platform | Doors will open on the left
L1	Concourse	Fare control, station agent, Metro Card vending machines, crossover
G	Street level	Exit/Entrance

== Facilities ==
List of available ATM at Mundka metro station are HDFC Bank, YES Bank

== Exits ==
Mundka metro station exits
Gate No-1	Gate No-2

== See also ==
- Delhi
- Mundka
- List of Delhi Metro stations
- Transport in Delhi
- Delhi Metro Rail Corporation
- Delhi Suburban Railway
- Delhi Monorail
- Delhi Transport Corporation
- South East Delhi
- New Delhi
- National Capital Region (India)
- List of rapid transit systems
- List of metro systems
