= Punjabi Bagh =

Neighbourhood in West Delhi district of Delhi, India

- Neighbourhood
- Location in Delhi, India Punjabi Bagh (India)
- Coordinates: 28.667508°N 77.121255°E
- Country: India
- Union Territory: Delhi
- District: West Delhi

Languages
  - Official: Hindi, Punjabi, English
- Time zone: UTC+5:30 (IST)
- PIN: 110026
- Lok Sabha constituency: New Delhi (4); West Delhi (6)
- Vidhan Sabha constituency: Moti Nagar (25); Madipur (26) (SC)

Punjabi Bagh is an affluent neighbourhood in the West Delhi district of Delhi, India.

== History ==
The land of the nearby Madipur village was acquired by government of India to resettle Hindu and Sikh refugees from Pakistan. It was previously called Refugees Colony, but was later renamed as Punjabi Bagh in 1960.

These refugees were allotted large pieces of land. However economic growth only started after 1990s and not much later it started becoming the locality for big houses of traders, businessmen, and transporters. The area is famous for these large houses measuring 280–550 square yards, while some plots are in the range of 1100–2200 square yards.

== Development ==
Punjabi Bagh has seen rapid commercial growth since the mid-90s with the opening of innumerable Banks, Salons, restaurants such as Domino's, KFC, McDonald's, Wok in the Clouds, Nandos, Thai Wok, Bikanerwala, Cafe Pasha, etc. Other establishments include health clubs, ice cream shops, sportswear showrooms like Adidas, Nike, Reebok etc. Shri Krishan Janmashathmi Mahotsav Punjabi Bagh is celebrated at Punjabi Bagh Stadium (known as Traffic Training Park). Also has a quaint little park named Shri Neki Ram Gupta Park

The colony mostly consists of private houses on the bungalow pattern and Kothis (large bungalows). However apartments too exist.

It houses some well known Delhi schools such as the Guru Nanak Public School, New Era Public School, S.M. Arya Public School (Punjabi Bagh), Hans Raj Model School, N C Jindal Public School (NCJPS), S.D. Public School (East Punjabi Bagh) and hospitals like Maharaja Agrasen Hospital, MGS Hospital and Teeny Town Playhomes – Indoor Playground for Kids

== Geography ==
The neighborhood is divided into Eastern and Western parts by the Ring Road. It is well-connected to various parts of the city and has a fairly good bus network and roads. It is also well-connected to the Delhi Metro with 4 stations within the main Punjabi Bagh Chowk area. The stations are Madipur, Shivaji Park and Punjabi Bagh East of the Green Line and Punjabi Bagh West on both green and the recently opened Pink Line.

The Western Part of Punjabi Bagh also has an ISKCON temple. ISKCON temple Punjabi Bagh is around 0.5 kilometers away from Punjabi Bagh Club on Road No.77(in the lane of Mother's Pride School), it was established in September 2007.

For recreation and social gatherings there is a club called the Punjabi Bagh Club mainly for the residents offering a lot of facilities like Swimming, Lawn tennis, Badminton, Roller skating, Basketball, Table tennis, Squash, Wedding lawns etc. It also has a well-equipped Gymnasium and rooms for arranging parties and kids entertainment.

Neighboring areas include Ashoka Park, Karampura, Paschim Vihar, Moti Nagar, Shakurpur, Pitam Pura, Bali Nagar, Raja Garden and Rajouri Garden

== Transport ==
Inter-State Bus Terminal: 13 km;
Indira Gandhi International Airport Domestic Airport: 14 km;
Indira Gandhi International Airport International Airport: 16 km;
Connaught Place: 9 km;
New Delhi Railway Station: 10 km;
Old Delhi Railway Station: 11 km;
