= Singhu =

Indian Village

- Village
- Location within Haryana
- Coordinates: 28°51′09″N 77°07′47″E
- Country: India
- State: Delhi
- District: North West Delhi

Population (2011)
  - Total: 4,564

Languages
  - Local: Hindi, English
- Time zone: UTC+5:30 (IST)

Singhu is a village in the North West Delhi district of the National Capital Region (India). Since, Singhu is the border between the states of Delhi and Haryana, it is also called the Singhu Border.

== History ==
Singhu Border became popular during the Indian farmers protest of 2020/2021 when the Indian government erected walls on a flank of the main highway to prevent Haryana protestors from reaching Delhi. As of 21 March 2021, according to Haryana Police, around 18,000-19,000 committed protestors were sitting at the Delhi border at Singhu.

== See also ==
- Tikri Kalan or Tikri Border on NH9, a village in western Delhi at the border between Delhi and Haryana states
