= Rani Khera, Delhi =

Village in northwest Delhi, India

Rani Khera is a village located in northwest Delhi, India. Traditionally an agrarian community, the village has experienced urbanization over the years. Despite these development plans, Rani Khera has faced challenges related to urbanization. In 2017-18, villagers successfully opposed the establishment of a landfill in their area, reflecting concerns about environmental degradation. Additionally, the village has experienced issues such as waterlogging and the proliferation of unauthorized colonies, leading to apprehensions about unplanned urban growth. This village is a low-lying location, water flows in from all around, causing waterlogging. The houses and the local areas get regularly flooded.Its neighbouring villages are Mundka, Rasoolpur, Kanjhawala and Ghevra.

== Demographics ==
As per the 2011 Census, Rani Khera had a population of 16,402 individuals, comprising 8,889 males and 7,513 females. The locality boasts a literacy rate of 82.69%, with male literacy at 89.69% and female literacy at 74.36%.

== Rani Khera Industrial Hub ==
The proposed 147-acre eco-friendly industrial hub in Rani Khera, approved by the Delhi government in January 2024, aims to promote IT, ITES, media, biotechnology, and research industries. Despite approvals, no construction has started as of March 2025. There has been no commencement of construction activities on the site. The project remains in the planning stages, with no visible progress on the ground.
