= 2022 Delhi fire =

Fatal structure fire in India

Coordinates: 28.6866108°N 77.0223095°E

- Date: 13 May 2022
- Location: Mundka, Delhi, India
- Cause: Short circuit (likely)
- Deaths: 27
- Injuries: 40
- Missing: 0

In the afternoon of 13 May 2022, a fire began on the first floor of four-storey office and commercial building near the Mundka metro station in the Mundka area of Delhi, India. It killed 27 people and injured 40 others, and at least 50 people were rescued. The fire is believed to have been started by a short circuit on first floor.

== Event ==
The building did not have clearance from the fire department and was not equipped with fire extinguishers. It did not have a factory licence, sanctioned building plan and Delhi Fire Services (DFS) official informed about the building never applying for a fire clearance inspection. The building had only one entry-exit point, thus trapping the occupants in the only stairway available for exit.

While the firefighters allegedly reached the site late, a crane driver saved over 50 people by rescuing them from the blaze. According to the crane driver, the fire service took over an hour and a half to arrive at the scene. More than 6 hours and 27 fire tenders were used to stop the fire.

== Aftermath ==
The Delhi police registered the fire as culpable homicide and a criminal conspiracy. They arrested two brothers, Harish & Varun Goyal, who owned Cofe Impex Pvt Ltd, a company that manufactures CCTV cameras, Wi-Fi routers, water purifiers, in whose office the fire is believed to have started. They also rented space on second and third floor, where workers worked for assembly. The owner of the building Manish Lakra, lived on top floor with his family; and escaped from terrace to adjacent building and was absconding since then.

The charred unidentified dead bodies underwent DNA testing; that caused delays of more than 2 weeks in handing over the bodies to the family. Prime Minister's Office announced compensation of ₹2 lakh (US$2,100) to the family of dead victims and ₹50,000 (US$520) to the injured victims and Delhi Governemnt announced compensation of ₹10 lakh (US$10,000) and ₹50,000 (US$520) respectively.

In March 2023, the Goyal brothers were released on bail. As of June 2026, the case against remains at the pre-trial stage with charges not filed.
