= Sanoth =

Sannoth
- Village
- Location in India
- Coordinates: 28.820671°N 77.07204°E
- Country: India
- State: Delhi
- District: North West

Population (2001)
  - Total: 6,075
- Time zone: UTC+5:30 (IST)

Sannoth or Sanoth is a village in Narela Zone, Narela in North West district in the Indian state of Delhi. The village is near Narela city.

== Demographics ==
As of 2001 India census, Sanoth had a population of 6075. Males constitute 60% of the population and females 40%. Sanoth has an average literacy rate of 72%, higher than the national average of 59.5%: male literacy is 79%, and female literacy is 66%. In Sanoth, 15% of the population is under 6 years of age.

== Transportation ==
Near Railway Station is Narela & Holambi Kalan of New Delhi-Chandigarh Railway Line. Bus routes 113, 178, 708, 136, 701, 969, etc. serve the area.

== Education ==
Sanoth village has 2 primary schools and 1 senior secondary school recognized by the Delhi Government.
