= Haryana Institute of Technology =

Engineering college in Haryana, India

Haryana Institute of Technology Bahadurgarh
- Type: Education
- Established: 2007
- CEO: Sh. SP Rathee
- Undergraduates: 960
- Postgraduates: 200
- Location: Bahadurgarh, Haryana, India; 28.7288571°N 76.8537179°E
- Campus: Urban, area 15 acres (0.061 km^{2})
- Website: http://www.hit.net.in/

Haryana Institute of Technology is an engineering college in Bahadurgarh, Haryana (located at 34/41 KM Asodha Village, Bahadurgarh).

== History ==
The institute was established as Haryana Institute of Technology, Bahadurgarh in 2007. HIT is part of the Indian Society for Development of Education which was formed in 2003 with the objective of providing education in the technical field of engineering, management, information technology, and vocational courses.

The Indian Society for Development of Education was registered under the Societies Act No. XXI of 1860 vide Registration no. 45226 of 2003 dated 30.01.2003.

== Campus ==
HIT is located in Asodha Village, Bahadurgarh, and is surrounded by green fields and water canals. The campus is situated on the NH-10.

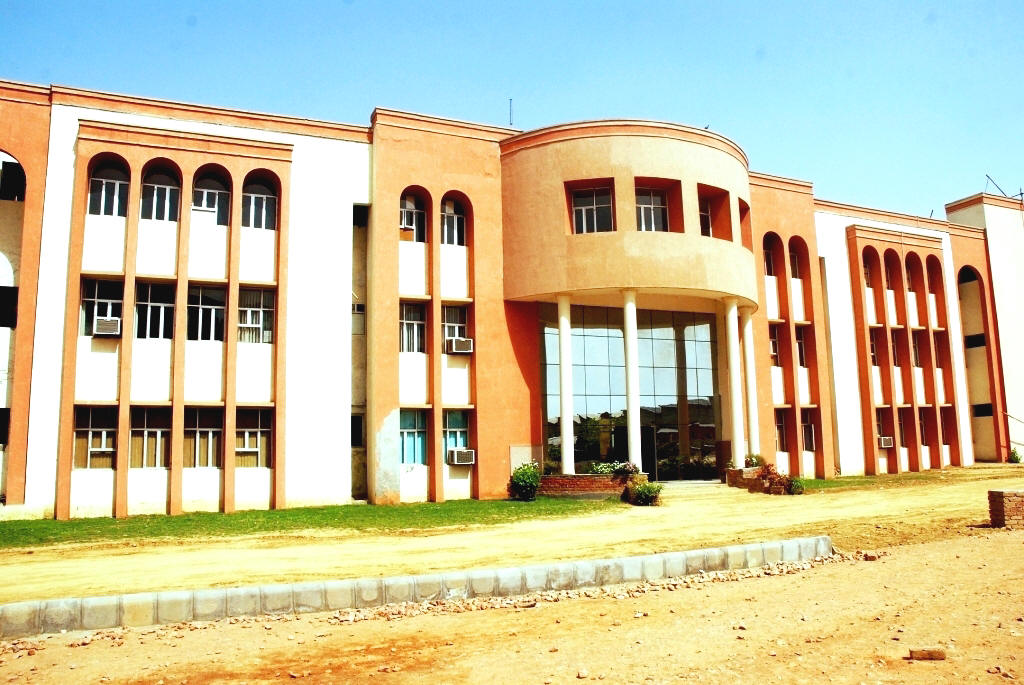
Hit building

The inside of the campus resembles a city with gardens, lawns, residential complexes and wide clean roads. The campus has its own water supply and backup electricity supply along with canteen and medical facility.

== Hostels ==
Separate hostel facilities for boys and girls are available close to the administrative block. Each hostel has a capacity of around 200 students. Each hostel has its own mess, a common room where residents can watch television and read magazines and newspapers and a visiting room where residents can receive their guests. In addition, each hostel has its own computer room facility. All the hostel rooms are provided with an internet connection.

Every hostel has a warden, who is a faculty of the college, and a caretaker. Hostels are in general self managed by students, with the warden not interfering in the hostel affairs, other than the clearing of bills and budget.

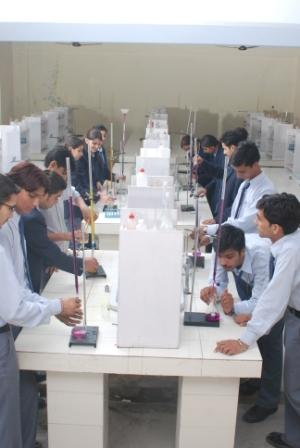
Chemistry lab

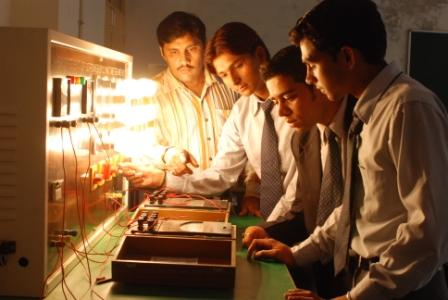
HIT lab

== Undergraduate programs ==
HIT Bahadurgarh offers a Bachelor of Technology in five areas that include Mechanical Engineering, Electronics Engineering, Computer Science and Engineering, Information Technology and Civil Engineering. The admission to these programs is done through AIEEE and LEET.
