= Hardayal Public School =

Private school in Haryana, India

Coordinates: 28.677359°N 76.934853°E

Information
- Established: 1998; 28 years ago
- Language: English
- Affiliation: Central Board of Secondary Education
- Website: www.hardayalpublicschool.com

Hardayal Public School is an English medium public school in Bahadurgarh, Haryana, India. The school was opened on 9 February 1998. It is affiliated with the Central Board of Secondary Education and its affiliation number is 530304. The principal is Mrs. Anuradha Yadav. The HPS is situated on Main Najafgarh Road, Bahadurgarh-124507.

The school is named "hardayal" after the architect Lt. Rao Hardayal Singh. It was established in 1998 and is located in a four-acre campus on Najafgarh Road, Bahadurgarh.

== Controversy ==
In 2024, Hardayal Public School was one of three examination centres in Jhajjar district for the National Eligibility cum Entrance Test in 2024. More than 500 candidates appeared in the examination at the school. The school faced allegations of adopting unfair means after six candidates who appeared there received a score of 720 out of 720, while two others scored 719 and 718. The National Testing Agency subsequently cancelled the grace marks awarded to the candidates who were affected by the loss of examination time.

After some weeks, a re-examination was conducted for the eligible candidates. In the results of the re-examination, the highest score recorded among the candidates at Hardayal Public School was 682. Only 13 candidates scored above 600. This contrasted with the initial results, in which six candidates from the centre had received a perfect score of 720.

== Incidents ==
In October 2017, a Class 12 student of Hardayal Public School was arrested after he attacked a mathematics teacher due a dispute over his examination marks. Police registered a case of attempted murder in connection with the incident.
