= Hindustan National Glass & Industries Limited =

Indian container glassmaker pvt ltd

- Type: Public
- Traded as: BSE: 515145; NSE: HINDNATGLS
- ISIN: INE952A01022
- Industry: Glass production
- Founded: 1946; 80 years ago
- Headquarters: Mumbai, Maharashtra, India
- Key people: Mr. Shrai M. Madhvani (Chairman); Mr. Kamlesh M. Madhvani (Vice-Chairman)
- Owner: INSCO
- Parent: Madhvani Group
- Website: www.hngil.com

Hindustan National Glass & Industries Limited (HNGIL) is an Indian container glassmaker based in Mumbai. The company is the largest and one of the oldest glass manufacturing companies in India.

== History ==
Hindustan National Glass & Industries Limited is engaged in manufacturing and selling of container glass. The company was originally incorporated on 23 February, under the name of "Hindustan National Glass Manufacturing Company Limited". On 22 November 1971 the name was changed to the present one. In 2018, it is reported to have barely escaped bankruptcy.

In September 2025, it was announced that the firm was acquired by Independent Sugar Corporation Limited (also known as INSCO), part of the Uganda-based Madhvani Group.

== Products ==
HNGIL manufactures containers for pharmaceuticals, liquor, beer, beverages, cosmetics and processed food.
