= Bali Nagar =

- Neighborhood of Delhi
- Location in India
- Coordinates: 28.656°N 77.132°E
- Country: India
- State: National Capital Territory of Delhi
- District: West Delhi

Government
  - Body: Municipal Corporation of Delhi

Languages
- Time zone: UTC+5:30 (IST)
- PIN: 110015
- Telephone code: 011
- Lok Sabha constituency: West Delhi
- Civic agency: Municipal Corporation of Delhi

Bali Nagar is a medium-high residential colony located in West of New Delhi, India. It was developed by Bali & Co (Pvt) Ltd. Once a farming land, it was sold for development in the 1970s and was primarily bought up by businessmen.

== History ==
Bali Nagar was developed by a real estate company known as Bali & Co (Pvt) Ltd. The vast collection of farming lands was opened up to development in Delhi's 1970s expansion to the north and west. Many of the new residents were Punjabis who had migrated from Punjab. Over the years, new families and communities have moved into the area, but it still remains a largely Punjabi-dominated area.

== Facilities ==
This government approved commercial market offers a variety of facilities such as a Hindu temple, Gurudwara Sahib, community hall, major banks and financial institutions such as HDFC Bank, Axis Bank, HDB Finance, Indian Overseas Bank, State Bank of Patiala, and Muthoot Finance along with some independent companies/offices. For food shopping there are supermarkets such as Reliance Fresh, Mother Dairy, and Flour Mill along with other independent grocers and food stores. It also boasts major business and brand presence such as LML World Showroom, Semiens, LG, Samsung, Vodafone, Hyundai Car Parts, Airtel, Exide, Bharat Music House, book publishing houses, and wine & beer shops. For eating out, there is a bar and some medium- to low-key restaurants which offer menus from typical Punjabi cuisine to Chinese/Muglai/Halwai sweets and snacks. From a medical point of view there are a few chemists, dental clinics, and several Doctors GP (general practitioner) clinics. There is also a hospital and a nursing home on the high street. Bali Nagar has a number of lush green and serene parks between the residential blocks. The main park offers a variety of activities and services such as yoga mornings, jogging/walking tracks, benches, and sections of kids' play areas. There are a variety of primary schools in and around Bali Nagar. The popular shopping district of Rajouri Garden (with its new malls) is about a ten-minute walk away. For transportation, Bali Nagar shares the Metro station with Ramesh Nagar. Ramesh Nagar Metro Station is sandwiched between Ramesh Nagar and the Southern edge of Bali Nagar on Najafgargh Road. There is also a convenient bus route with stands near both the North and South edges of Bali Nagar. There is also an auto rickshaw stand and cycle rickshaws that are easily available day and night.
