= Tikri Khurd =

- Village
- Location in India
- Country: India
- Union Territory: Delhi
- District: North West

Population (2011)
  - Total: 3,690

Languages
  - Official: Hindi
- Time zone: UTC+5:30 (IST)

Tikri Khurd is a village in Outer North Delhi under Narela Legislative Constituency.

== Etymology ==
"Tikri" word means a small mound, hillock, or elevated spot in North Indian dialects. Khurd and Kalan are Persian words meaning small and big respectively. They are used to distinguish two villages of the same name with reference to their relative size to each other, with the comparatively bigger village being called Kalan (big) and the smaller village being called Khurd (small).

== Demography ==
Tikri Khurd is dominated by Jats of Khatri clan.

== Transport ==
Tikri Khurd village lies on the Grand Trunk Road NH44, and the Narela railway station is the nearest railway station.

== See also ==
- Tikri Kalan, a village in western Delhi at the border between Delhi and Haryana states
