= Ghevra =

- Village
- Ghevra
- Location in India
- Coordinates: 28.6895°N 76.9943°E
- Country: India
- State: Delhi
- District: North West

Population (2001)
  - Total: 5,920

Languages
  - Official: Hindi, English, Haryanvi
- Time zone: UTC+5:30 (IST)
- PIN: 110081
- Telephone code: 2595
- Website: www.ghevra.com

Ghevra is a census town in North West district in the state of Delhi, India.

== Demographics ==
As of 2001, according to the Indian census, Ghevra had a population of 5920. Males constitute 59% of the population and females 41%. Ghevra has an average literacy rate of 69%, higher than the national average of 59.5%: male literacy is 75%, and female literacy is 61%. In Ghevra, 13% of the population is under six years of age. The nearest metro station is Ghevra Metro Station located on Green metro line.

The town was originally inhabited by forward castes like Jats of Jatrana & Dabas clan and Brahmans, also SC community.

== Notable people ==
- Harshit Rana, cricketer
