= Bahadurgarh =

- City
- View of Bahadurgarh City metro station in Bahadurgarh, Jhajjar district, Haryana, India

- Location in Haryana, India Bahadurgarh (India)
- Coordinates: 28.68°N 76.92°E
- Country: India
- State: Haryana
- District: Jhajjar
- Founder: Rathi Jats
- Named for: Baloch ruler Bahadur Khan

Government
  - Body: Municipal Council of Bahadurgarh
  - Chairperson: Mrs. Saroj Rathi

Area
  - Total: 50 km^{2} (19 sq mi)

Population (2011)
  - Total: 170,767

Languages
  - Official: Hindi, Haryanvi
- Time zone: UTC+5:30 (IST)
- PIN: 124507
- Tel Code: 01276
- Vehicle registration: HR-13 (Private), HR-63 (Commercial)
- gender ratio: 1.13 ♂/♀
- Vidhan Sabha constituency: Bahadurgarh
- Planning agency: Haryana Shahari Vikas Pradhikaran
- Civic agency: Municipal council of Bahadurgarh

Bahadurgarh is a city and municipal council within Jhajjar district in the Indian state of Haryana and Part of National Capital Region or NCR of Delhi. The city comprises 31 wards and is approximately 21 km from National Capital Territory (NCT) of Delhi and 31 km from Jhajjar, the district headquarter.

Bahadurgarh is also known as the "Gateway of Haryana".

== History ==
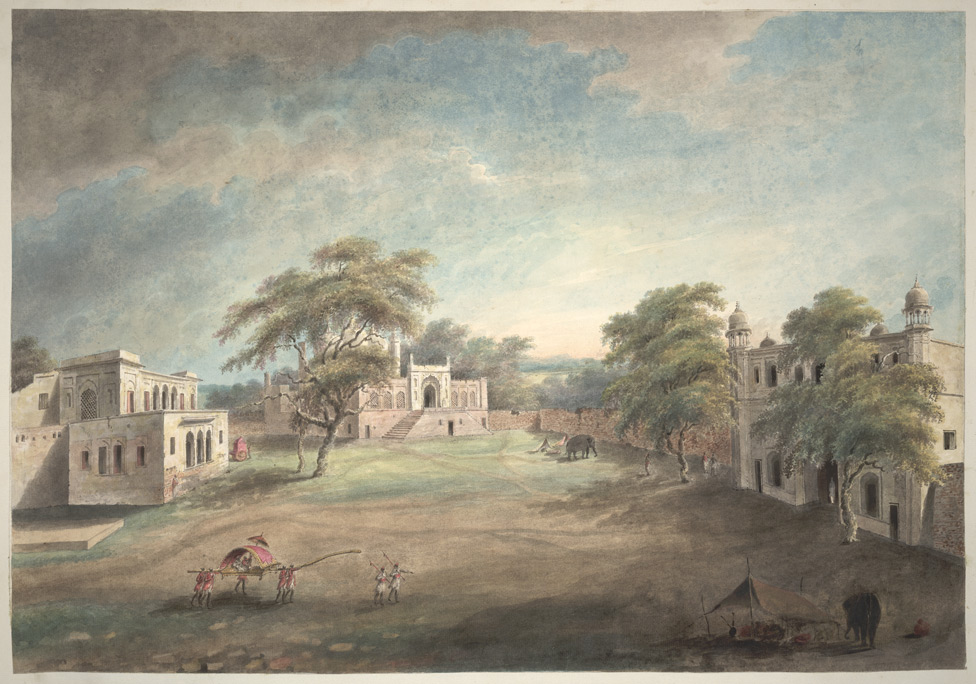
Watercolour view of Bahadurgarh by Sita Ram (fl. c.1810-1822)

Bahadurgarh was founded by either the Rathee Jats, or Mughal Emperor Alamgir II who ruled from 1754 to 1759. He gave the town in jagir to Bahadur Khan and Tej Khan, Baloch rulers of Farrukhnagar in 1754, who changed its name from Sharafabad to Bahadurgarh. One of their ruler, Bahadur Khan, constructed a fort in 1793 CE and named it Bahadurgarh Fort. Baloch Nawabs were defeated by Maratha forces and Bahadurgarh came into the hands of Sindhia in 1793. After Sindhia's defeat in 1803 at the hands of the British raj, Lord Lake transferred control of the town's government to the brother of the Nawab of Jhajjar in the aftermath of Treaty of Surji-Anjangaon. Bahadurgarh Fort is also called Singh Dwar or Gateway of Haryana.

During 1995–1998, a series of rapes and murders of young girls by the Bahadurgarh baby killer led to several dharnas and bandhs by the local population. The police prosecuted three men as the "baby killer", before the real culprit was caught in November 1998.

== Geography ==
Bahadurgarh is located in the Jhajjar district in the Indian state of Haryana and is situated in the eastern part of the state, and northern part of the country. The city is located on the border with New Delhi (commonly known as Tikri Border). The city has a total area of 50 km^{2}. It is located between 76º-55'-25" East longitude and 28º-43'-50" North latitude. The city of Bahadurgarh is very well linked with New Delhi and other important towns such as Rohtak, Sonipat, Najafgarh and Nangloi by Roads and Railways.

=== Climate ===
The climate of Bahadurgarh is considered to be a local steppe climate. Here, there is little rainfall throughout the year. This climate is considered to be BSh according to the Köppen-Geiger climate classification. The average temperature in the city is 25.1 °C (77.2 °F). The average annual rainfall is approximately 510 mm (20 in). The city experiences all four seasons along with the monsoon season setting in towards the later half of the summer. Summers are usually long and hot extending from early April to October which includes the monsoon season. Whereas winters start in November and extend till late February. The winters are usually cold and foggy with a few sunny days.

Climate data for Bahadurgarh
Month	Jan	Feb	Mar	Apr	May	Jun	Jul	Aug	Sep	Oct	Nov	Dec	Year
Record high °C (°F)	27 (81)	33 (91)	41 (106)	45 (113)	49 (120)	47 (117)	45 (113)	41 (106)	39 (102)	38 (100)	33 (91)	29 (84)	47 (117)
Mean daily maximum °C (°F)	19 (66)	24 (75)	29 (84)	37 (99)	41 (106)	39 (102)	35 (95)	33 (91)	34 (93)	33 (91)	28 (82)	22 (72)	33.5 (92.3)
Mean daily minimum °C (°F)	6 (43)	8 (46)	13 (55)	20 (68)	26 (79)	29 (84)	28 (82)	26 (79)	24 (75)	19 (66)	13 (55)	8 (46)	18.3 (64.9)
Record low °C (°F)	0 (32)	2 (36)	7 (45)	14 (57)	21 (70)	25 (77)	25 (77)	24 (75)	21 (70)	15 (59)	8 (46)	2 (36)	0 (32)
Average rainfall mm (inches)	8 (0.3)	18 (0.7)	10 (0.4)	11 (0.4)	21 (0.8)	49 (1.9)	135 (5.3)	128 (5.0)	66 (2.6)	18 (0.7)	2 (0.1)	7 (0.3)	476 (18.7)
Average rainy days	2.2	4.4	4.2	4	6.9	12	22.2	22.6	10.9	2.1	0.7	1.5	93.7
Source: MeteoBlue (Based on 30-year Data)

== Demographics ==
According to the 2011 census, the population of Bahadurgarh is 170,426: 91,736 men and 78,690 women. There are 20,374 total children (0-6) --11,420 boys and 8,954 girls. The child gender ratio is 784 girls per 1000 boys. The average literacy rate in Bahadurgarh is 88.04%; the male and female literacy rates were 94.27 and 80.87 percent.

Religion in Bahadurgarh City
Religion	Population (1911)	Percentage (1911)
Hinduism	2,551	51.12%
Islam	2,344	46.97%
Christianity	55	1.1%
Others (Note: Including Jainism, Buddhism, Zoroastrianism, Judaism, others, or not stated)	40	0.8%
Total Population	4,990	100%

== Economics ==
=== Industrial Model Township Bahadurgarh ===
Bahadurgarh is often called as an "Industrial Hub". It has a large Industrial area in Haryana's Delhi NCR region situated along Delhi Western Peripheral Expressway, i.e.- MIE-I, MIE-II, HSIIDC(Sector16 & 17).It is an important Industrial town wherein Haryana Government has developed about 200 hectares (490 acres) of land for Industrial purpose. Besides other big Industrial units such as Hindustan National Glass Company, Hindustan Sanitary Wares, Surya Roshni, Somany Ceramics, Parle Biscuits and Swastik Pipe, Relaxo, Aerobok Shoes, Yokohoma, Seaga India etc. are its main Industrial Units existing here on the land privately purchased by them. The town has specialization in manufacturing of Sanitary Ware, China Ware, Galvanized steel pipe, footwear etc. In bahadurgarh there is especially developed footwear park established to enhance the production of footwear industries. Recently an area of about 250 Hectares has also been developed by Haryana State Industrial and Infrastructure Development Corporation for Industrial purpose. It is connected to Delhi Metro green line since June 2018.

== Education ==
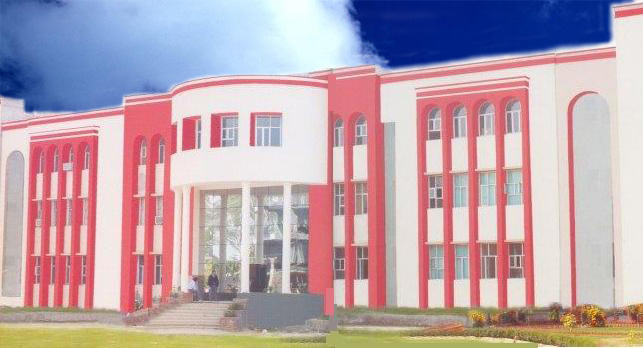
HIT Bahadurgarh

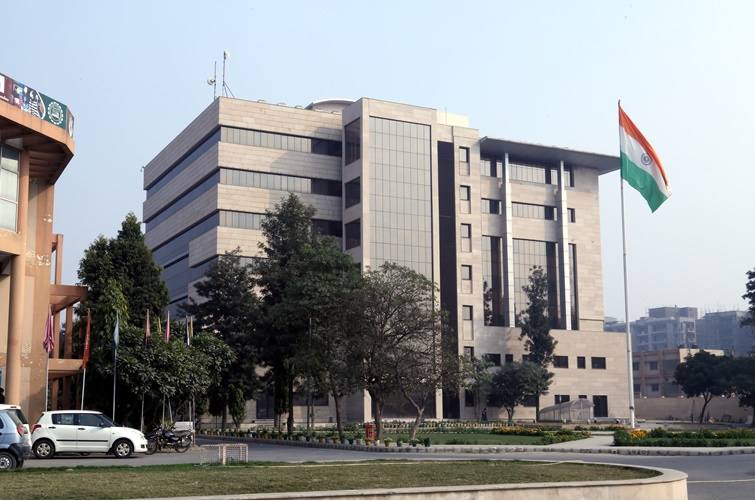
PDM University, Bahadurgarh

Bahadurgarh is considered a Knowledge Hub due to presence of a number of Govt. & Private College & Institutions including PDM University, Bls Institute of Technology and Management, Haryana Institute of Technology (HIT), DTC (Delhi Tech. Campus), AKIDO College of Engineering, MERI Engineering college, Ganga Technical Campus, Sat Kabir Institute of Technology, Vaish Kanya Mahavidyalaya, Govt. PG College for Boys and Govt. PG College for Girls. Majaraja Agrasen Medical College is under construction in sector 37, on Bahadurgarh-Jhajjar Road near Delhi bypass. After completion, it will be the largest medical institute in Bahadurgarh city.

There are approx. 75 schools in the city, affiliated to CBSE & State Board. Major schools of the area include Hardayal Public School, Bal Bharti, scholar, Triveni, SR century school, Vijaya Sr Sec School, St Thomas, Sainik Public School and Delhi Public School.

== Transport ==
Bahadurgarh is well connected with other parts of the country through Roadways, Railways (Including National Railways), in June 2018 Bahadurgarh City metro station connected to Green Line was opened, which connects the city to different parts of New Delhi.

=== Roads ===
The major National Highways and Expressways that connect the city are National Highway 9, Urban Extension Road-II (Bahadurgarh Spur), Western Peripheral Expressway and Delhi–Amritsar–Katra Expressway. The highways link Bahadurgarh to Delhi, Amritsar, Hisar, Rohtak and various other cities of India. Multiple modes of public transport are available such as taxis, buses, e-rickshaws, and auto rickshaws.

=== Rail ===
Bahadurgarh is a railway station, and it falls under Delhi Division of Northern Railway.

=== Delhi Metro ===
The Green Line of the Delhi Metro connects Bahadurgarh.

Bahadurgarh is connected to the Green Line of the Delhi Metro since 24 June 2018. From Inderlok / Kirti Nagar to Brigadier Hoshiyar Singh metro station in Bahadurgarh, the total travel time on Delhi Metro is approximately 50 minutes. In September 2018, CM Manohar Lal Khattar renamed Bus Stand metro station and City Park metro station to Bahadurgarh City metro station and Brigadier Hoshiyar Singh metro station respectively.

== Census 2011 ==
As per provisional reports of Census India, the population of Bahadurgarh in 2011 is 170,426; of which males and females are 91,736 and 78,690 respectively. In the education section, total literates in Bahadurgarh city are 132,108 of which 75,714 are males while 56,394 are females. The average literacy rate of Bahadurgarh city is 88.04 percent of which male and female literacy was 94.27 and 80.87 percent. The sex ratio of Bahadurgarh city is 858 per 1000 males. The child sex ratio of girls is 784 per 1000 boys. Total children (0-6) in Bahadurgarh city are 20,374 as per figure from Census India report on 2011. There were 11,420 boys while 8,954 are girls. The child forms 11.95% of the total population of Bahadurgarh City.

== See also ==
- Rohtak
- Desalpur, Bahadurgarh
- Gurgaon
- Faridabad
- Jhajjar
- Kheri Jasaur
- Surya Roshni Limited
