= Tikri Kalan =

- Village/Neighborhood of Delhi
- Location in Delhi, India
- Coordinates: 28.683°N 76.965°E
- Country: India
- Union Territory: Delhi
- District: North West Delhi
- Nearest City: New Delhi
- Founder: Teka Drall

Languages
  - Official: Hindi, Haryanvi
- Time zone: UTC+5:30 (IST)
- PIN: 110041

Tikri Kalan, a Village & Census Town in North West Delhi district in the Indian union territory of Delhi, is located on the Delhi-Rohtak-Hisar Road (NH9). Since it is the border between Delhi and Haryana, it is also called the Tikri Border.

== Etymology ==
"Tikri" word means a small mound, hillock, or elevated spot in North Indian dialects. Khurd and Kalan are Persian words meaning small and large, respectively. They are used to distinguish Kalan (large) villages from Khurd (small) villages when the two are paired with the same name.

== History ==
Gulab Pehalwan, the wrester from Tikri Kalan.

In 1990s, Gulab Pehalwan from Tikri Kalan was a well-known wrestler.

== Demographics ==
Some 3,455 houses abide there. As per Census India 2011, the town has a population of 16,313, of which 9,247 are males and 7,066 are females. The population of children aged 0–6 is 2,530, 15.51% of the total. Female Sex Ratio is at 764, lower than the state average of 868. Child Sex Ratio is around 831 compared to Delhi state average of 871. Literacy rate of Tikri Kalan city is 81.47%, lower than the state average of 86.21%. Male literacy is around 89.19% while the female literacy rate is at 71.21%.

Haryanvi ( Deshwali Dialect) is the local language.

== Economy ==
5,728 people engage in work and business activity. Of the working population, 95.90% were engaged in main work while 4.10% were engaged in marginal work.

== Education ==
Tikri is known as Delhi's best coaching centre called the Fourth Lord. It is located on the Delhi-Rohtak Road (National Highway 10). This place is dominated by the "Drall" Gotra of the Jat Community,"Bhardwaj" Gotra of Brahman community and many other caste as well. This village gets its name from the Tika Drall.

== See also ==
- Tikri Khurd, a village in Outer North Delhi
- Singhu or Singhu Border on NH44, a village in Outer North Delhi at the border between Delhi and Haryana states
