= West Delhi district =

- District of Delhi
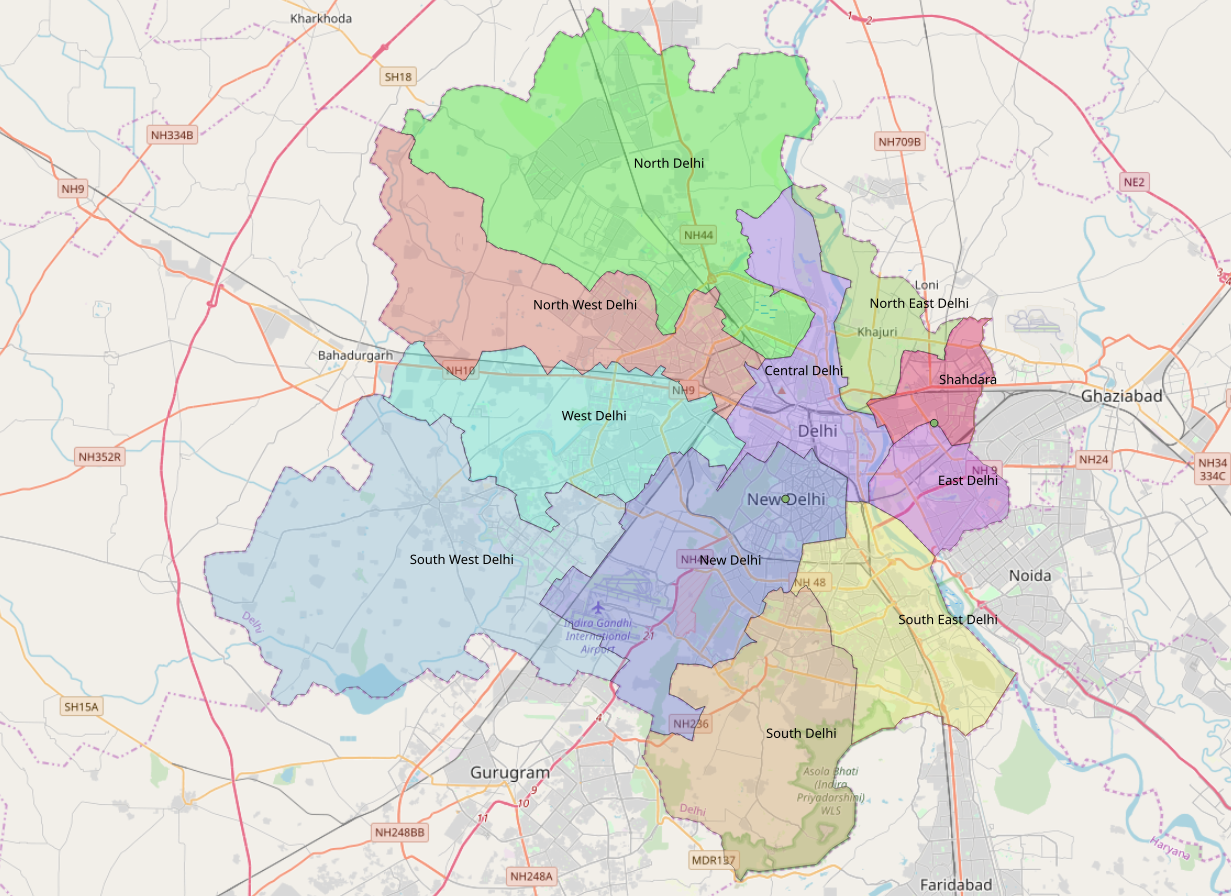
- Location in Delhi, India
- Coordinates: 28.6608°N 77.1008°E
- Country: India
- State: Delhi
- Headquarters: Rajouri Garden

Government
  - Body: Municipal Corporation of Delhi
  - Member of Parliament: Kamaljeet Sehrawat

Area
  - Total: 129 km^{2} (50 sq mi)
  - Rank: 2nd in Delhi
- Elevation: 219 m (719 ft)

Population (2011)
  - Total: 2,543,243
  - Rank: 1st in Delhi
  - Density: 19,700/km^{2} (51,100/sq mi)

Languages
  - Official: Punjabi, Hindi
- Time zone: UTC+5:30 (IST)
- PIN: 1100xx
- Lok Sabha constituency: West Delhi
- Website: dcwestrev.delhi.gov.in

West Delhi district is one of the 11 administrative districts of the National Capital Territory of Delhi in India. It is most populated district in Delhi NCT. Administratively, the district is divided into three subdivisions, Patel Nagar, Rajouri Garden and Punjabi Bagh. West Delhi is bound by the districts of North West Delhi to the north, North Delhi and Central Delhi to the east, South West Delhi to the south, and Jhajjar District of Haryana state to the west. Major residential and commercial areas of Delhi like Janakpuri, Uttam Nagar and Tilak Nagar are located in West Delhi.

West Delhi has an area of 129 km^{2} (50 sq mi), with a population density of nearly 14,000 persons per km^{2} (about 36,000 per sq mi). The population of 2,543,243 consists of 1,356,240 males and 1,187,003 females. Children between 0–6 years are 203,528 (109,526 boys and 94,002 girls). In 2001, the literacy rate for West Delhi was above 83% (87.85% of males and 77.99% of females).

== Demographics ==
Historical population
Year	Pop.	±%
1961	250,702	—
1971	572,976	+128.5%
1981	958,931	+67.4%
1991	1,433,038	+49.4%
2001	2,128,908	+48.6%
2011	2,543,243	+19.5%
2021	2,960,000	+16.4%
2024	3,070,000	+3.7%
2025	3,090,000	+0.7%
Source: Census of India

According to the 2011 census, West Delhi has a population of 2,543,243, roughly equal to the nation of Kuwait or the US state of Nevada. This gives it a ranking of 169th in India (out of a total of 640). The district has a population density of 19,625 inhabitants per square kilometre (50,830/sq mi) . Its population growth rate over the decade 2001–2011 was +19.46%. West Delhi has a sex ratio of 876 females for every 1,000 males, and a literacy rate of 86.98%. Male Literacy is 91.0%, while Female Literacy is 82.39%. 2,536,823 (99.75%) of the population lives in urban areas. Scheduled Castes make up 14.80% of the population.

Religions in West Delhi district (2011)
Religion	Percent
Hinduism	82.07%
Sikhism	10.69%
Islam	5.89%
Christianity	0.72%
Jainism	0.45%
Other or not stated	0.18%

Languages of West Delhi district (2011)
1. Hindi (75.5%)
2. Punjabi (14.5%)
3. Bhojpuri (1.66%)
4. Urdu (1.32%)
5. Rajasthani (1.06%)
6. Others (5.98%)

At the time of the 2011 census, 75.46% of the population spoke Hindi, 14.52% Punjabi, 1.66% Bhojpuri 1.32% Urdu and 1.06% Rajasthani as their first language.

The ethnic Punjabis, which is mostly Hindi-speaking, constitutes over 60% of West Delhi's population.

=== List of Subdistricts by population ===
List of Subdistricts by Population
Subdistrict	Population
Patel Nagar	1,262,158(1st)
Punjabi Bagh	799,453(2nd)
Rajouri Garden	481,632(3rd)
Total	2,543,243(-)

== List of Subdistricts ==
- Patel Nagar
- Punjabi Bagh
- Rajouri Garden

== See also ==
- Districts of Delhi
- Bali Nagar
- Kirti Nagar
