= North West Delhi district =

- District of Delhi
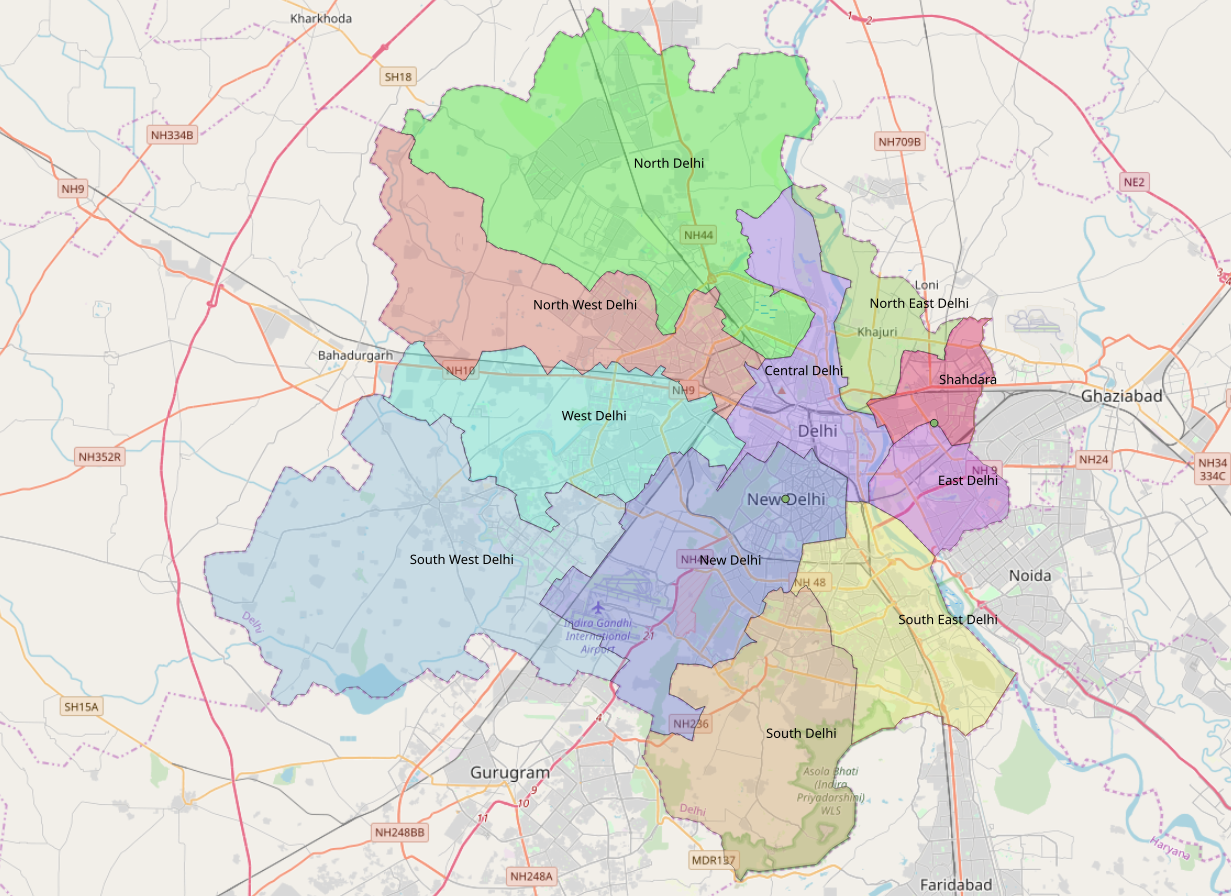
- Location in Delhi
- Coordinates: 28.6964°N 77.1271°E
- Country: India
- State: Delhi
- Headquarters: Kanjhawala

Government
  - Body: Municipal Corporation of Delhi
  - Member of Parliament: Yogender Chandoliya

Area
  - Total: 442.84 km^{2} (170.98 sq mi)
- Elevation: 213 m (699 ft)

Population (2011)
  - Total: 3,211,042
  - Density: 7,251.0/km^{2} (18,780/sq mi)

Languages
  - Official: Haryanvi, Hindi, English, Punjabi
- Time zone: UTC+5:30 (IST)
- PIN: 1100xx
- Lok Sabha constituency: North-West Delhi
- Civic agency: NDMC
- Website: dmnorthwest.delhi.gov.in

North West Delhi district is an administrative district of the National Capital Territory of Delhi in India.

== Geography ==
North West Delhi is bounded by the Yamuna River on the northeast, and by the districts of North Delhi to the east and southeast, West Delhi to the south, Jhajjar District of Haryana state to the west, Sonipat District of Haryana to the northwest and north, Bagpat District and Ghaziabad District of Uttar Pradesh state to the northeast across the Yamuna.

== Demographics ==
Historical population
Year	Pop.	±% p.a.
1961	240,973	—
1971	450,419	+6.45%
1981	991,186	+8.21%
1991	1,777,968	+6.02%
2001	2,860,869	+4.87%
2011	3,656,539	+2.48%

According to the 2011 census North West Delhi has a population of 3,656,539, roughly equal to the nation of Liberia or the US state of Oklahoma. This gives it a ranking of 78th in India (out of a total of 640). The district has a population density of 8,298 inhabitants per square kilometre (21,490/sq mi). Its population growth rate over the decade 2001–2011 was 27.63%. North West Delhi has a sex ratio of 862 females for every 1000 males, and a literacy rate of 84.66%.

The bifurcated district had a population of 2,250,816, of which 2,205,605 (97.99%) of the population lived in urban areas. The district had a sex ratio of 872 females per 1000 males. Scheduled Castes made up 19.31% of the population.

Religions in North West Delhi district (2011)
Religion	Percent
Hinduism	87.82%
Islam	7.97%
Sikhism	2.52%
Jainism	1.19%
Other or not stated	0.50%

Languages of North West Delhi district (2011)
1. Hindi (86.1%)
2. Punjabi (4.04%)
3. Urdu (1.95%)
4. Bhojpuri (1.72%)
5. Haryanvi (1.13%)
6. Maithili (1.08%)
7. Others (3.98%)

At the time of the 2011 census, 86.10% of the population spoke Hindi, 4.04% Punjabi, 1.95% Urdu, 1.72% Bhojpuri 1.13% Haryanvi and 1.08% Maithili as their first language.

== Administration ==
Administratively, the district is divided into three subdivisions: Saraswati Vihar, Rohini Sub City, and Kanjhawala.

== See also ==
- List of districts of Delhi
