= Inderlok metro station =

Metro station in Delhi, India

Inderlok

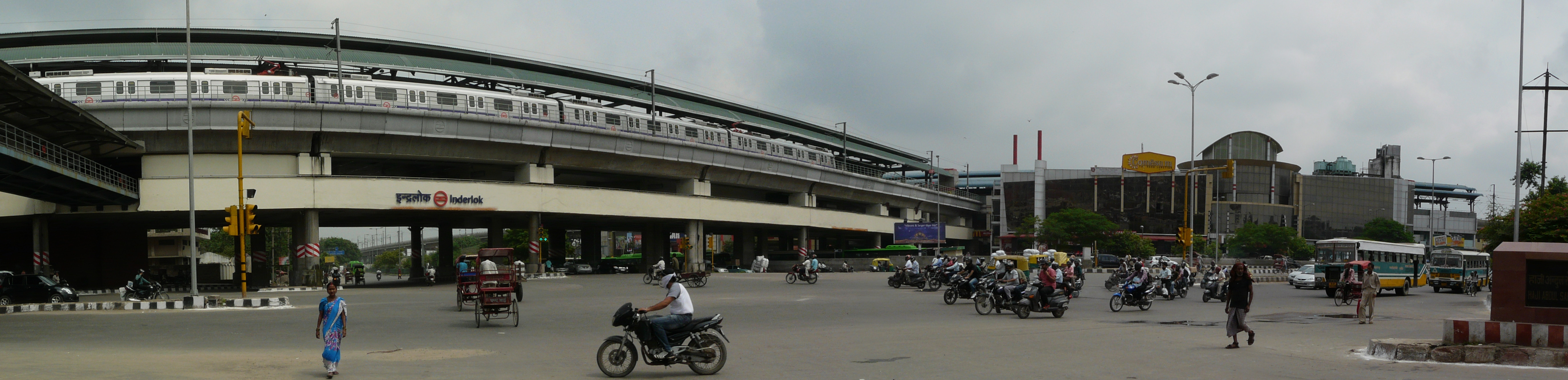
- Inderlok metro station

General information
- Location: Block A, Anand Nagar, Inderlok, New Delhi, Delhi, 110052
- Coordinates: 28°40′24″N 77°10′13″E
- System: Delhi Metro station
- Owner: Delhi Metro
- Line: Red Line Green Line Magenta Line
- Platforms: Side platform (Red Line); Platform-1 → Rithala; Platform-2 → Shaheed Sthal (New Bus Adda); Island platform (Green Line); Platform-3 → Brigadier Hoshiyar Singh; Platform-4 → Brigadier Hoshiyar Singh
- Tracks: 4

Construction
- Structure type: Elevated
- Platform levels: 2
- Parking: Available
- Accessible: Yes

Other information
- Station code: ILOK

History
- Opened: 3 October 2003; 23 years ago (Red Line); 2 April 2010; 16 years ago (Green Line)
- Electrified: 25 kV 50 Hz AC through overhead catenary

Passengers
- October 2019: 67,945
- October 2023: 63,546 ▼6.5%

Services
| Preceding station | Delhi Metro | Following station |
|---|---|---|
| Kanhaiya Nagar towards Rithala | Red Line | Shastri Nagar towards Shaheed Sthal (New Bus Adda) |
| Ashok Park Main towards Brigadier Hoshiyar Singh | Green Line | Terminus |
Future Service
| Terminus | Magenta Line | Daya Basti towards Botanical Garden |
Route map
Location

Inderlok (formerly known as Trinagar) is an interchange station between the Red Line and Green Line of the Delhi Metro. It is one of the two termini of the Green Line, with trains operating towards Brigadier Hoshiar Singh in Bahadurgarh, Jhajjar district, Haryana. At Inderlok, the Green Line meets the Red Line at a right angle.

== Station layout ==
Station Layout Red Line

| L2 | Side platform | Doors will open on the left |
| L2 | Platform 2 Eastbound | Towards → Shaheed Sthal (New Bus Adda); Next Station: Shastri Nagar |
| L2 | Platform 1 Westbound | Towards ← Rithala; Next Station: Kanhaiya Nagar |
| L2 | Side platform | Doors will open on the left |
| L1 | Concourse | Fare control, station agent, Metro Card vending machines, crossover |
| G | Street Level | Exit/Entrance |

Station Layout Green Line

| P | Platform 4 Eastbound | Train Terminates Here / Towards ← Brigadier Hoshiyar Singh; Next Station: Ashok Park Main (Passengers heading towards Kirti Nagar may alight at the next station) |
| P | Island platform | Doors will open on the right |
| P | Platform 3 Westbound | Towards ← Brigadier Hoshiyar Singh; Next Station: Ashok Park Main (Passengers heading towards Kirti Nagar may alight at the next station) |
| C | Concourse | Fare control, station agent, Ticket/token, shops |
| G | Street Level | Exit/ Entrance |

== Facilities ==
The station has the following facilities:

- ATM: PNB ATM near gate number 1
- Toilet: 2 Sulabh Toilets near gate number 1 and gate number 5
- Food / Restaurant: WH Smith and Munch with Ava on the paid concourse
- Stores: Comesum, Raymond, Doeacc Society, Big Bazaar, Rachna Cafe, Hot 'n' Chilli

== Exits ==
Inderlok station entry/exits
| Gate No-1 | Gate No-2 | Gate No-3 | Gate No-4 | Gate No-5 | Gate No-6 |
|---|---|---|---|---|---|
| Big Bazaar Entry | Service Road | Big Bazaar Exit | Cooler Market | Nirankari Bhawan | CISF Dog Training Area |

== See also ==
- List of Delhi Metro stations
- Transport in Delhi
- Delhi Metro Rail Corporation
- Delhi Suburban Railway
- List of rapid transit systems in India
- Delhi Transport Corporation
- List of Metro Systems
