= Brigadier Hoshiyar Singh metro station =

Metro station in Haryana, India

Brigadier Hoshiar Singh metro station

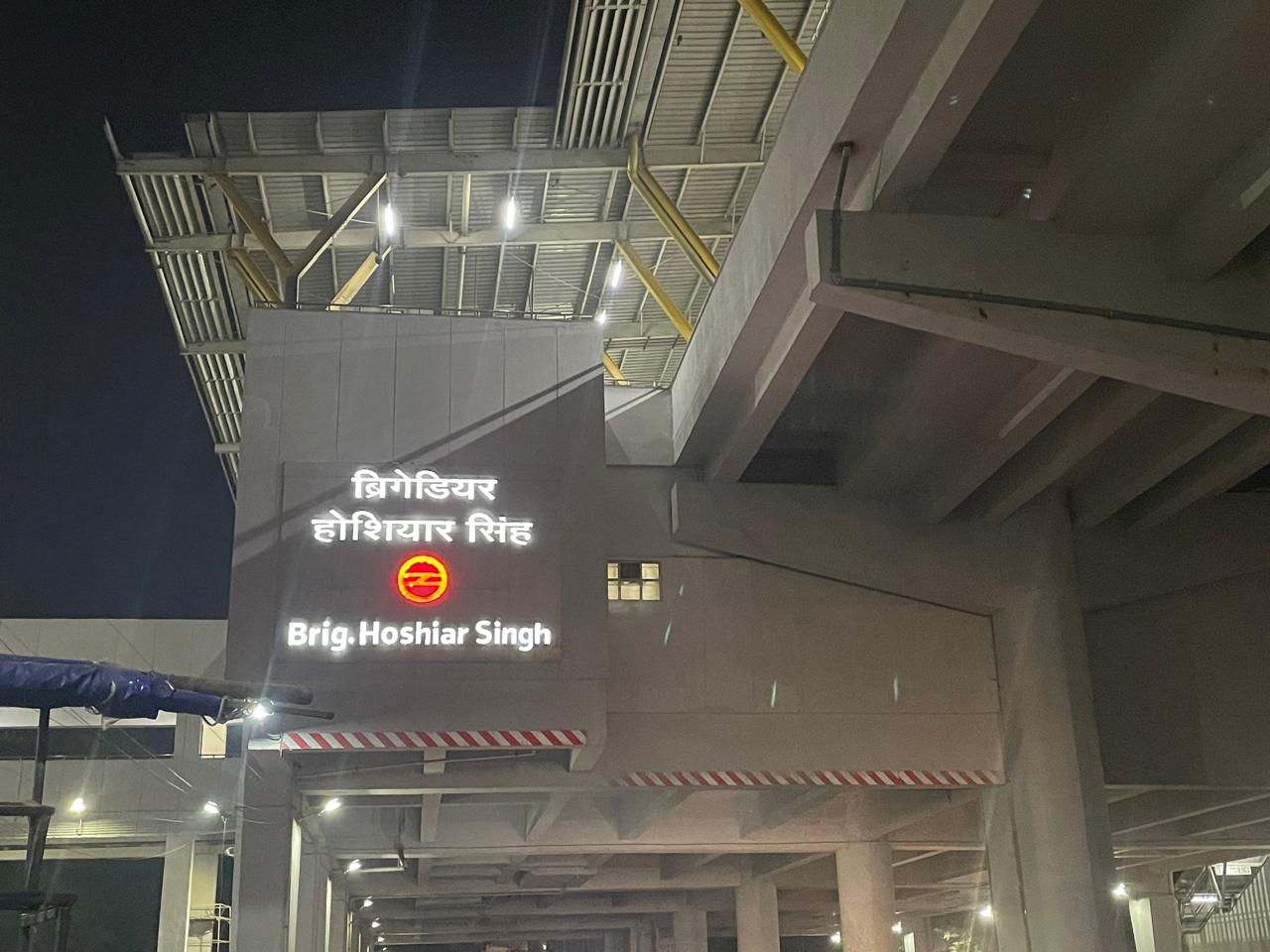
- Outside of Brigadier Hoshiyar Singh metro station

General information
- Location: NH-9, Rohtak Road, Bahadurgarh, Jhajjar district, Haryana
- Coordinates: 28°41′50″N 76°55′09″E
- System: Delhi Metro station
- Owner: Delhi Metro Rail Corporation
- Line: Green Line
- Platforms: Side platform; Platform-1 → Train Terminates Here; Platform-2 → Inderlok / Kirti Nagar
- Tracks: 2

Construction
- Structure type: Elevated
- Platform levels: 2
- Parking: Available
- Accessible: Yes

Other information
- Station code: CIPK

History
- Opening: 24 June 2018
- Electrified: 25 kV 50 Hz AC through overhead catenary
- Former names: City Park metro station

Services
Preceding station	Delhi Metro	Following station
Terminus	Green Line	Bahadurgarh City towards Inderlok or Kirti Nagar
Route map
Location

Brigadier Hoshiar Singh (formerly known as City Park) is an elevated terminal metro station on the Green Line of the Delhi Metro, located in Bahadurgarh, Jhajjar district, Haryana. It serves as the western terminus of the line. Nearby landmarks include Tau Devi Lal Park and Sectors 6 and 7 of Bahadurgarh.

== Etymology ==
The station was originally known as City Park metro station. On 13 September 2018, the Haryana government announced its renaming to Brigadier Hoshiar Singh metro station in honour of Brigadier Hoshiar Singh. The announcement was made by Chief Minister Manohar Lal Khattar as part of a renaming exercise involving several metro stations in Haryana.

== Station layout ==
L2	Side platform | Doors will open on the left
L2	Platform 2 Eastbound	Towards → Inderlok / Kirti Nagar; Next Station: Bahadurgarh City
L2	Platform 1 Westbound	Towards ← Train Terminates Here
L2	Side platform | Doors will open on the left
L1	Concourse	Fare control, station agent, Metro Card vending machines, crossover
G	Street level	Exit/Entrance

== Facilities ==
List of available ATM at Bahadurgarh City Park metro station are

== Exits ==
Exit 1 (Gate No.1) – Tau Devilal Park, Sector-6, Sector-7, Housing Board Colony, PDM University

Exit 2 (Gate No.2) – Old Industrial Area, Civil Hospital, New Basti, Nehru Park

== See also ==
- List of Delhi Metro stations
- Transport in Delhi
- Delhi Metro Rail Corporation
- Delhi Suburban Railway
- List of rapid transit systems in India
