= Kirti Nagar metro station =

Metro station in Delhi, India

Kirti Nagar

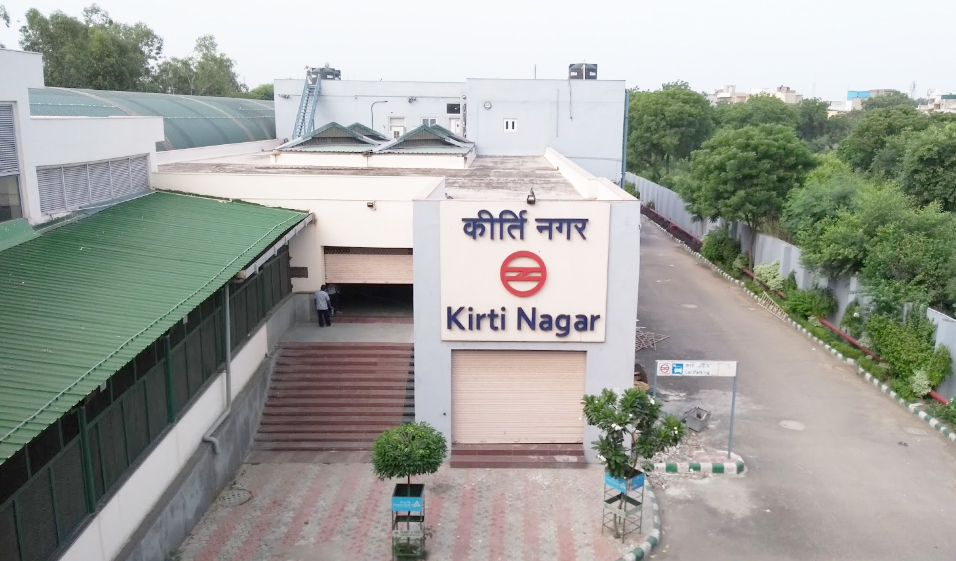
- Kirti Nagar metro station

General information
- Coordinates: 28°39′18″N 77°09′05″E
- System: Delhi Metro station
- Owner: Delhi Metro
- Line: Blue Line Green Line
- Platforms: Side platform; Platform-1 → Noida Electronic City / Vaishali; Platform-2 → Dwarka Sector 21; Platform-3 → Brigadier Hoshiyar Singh; Platform-4 → Train Terminates
- Tracks: 4
- Connections: Kirti Nagar

Construction
- Structure type: Elevated (Blue line); At Grade (Green line)
- Platform levels: 2
- Parking: Available
- Cycle facilities: Yes
- Accessible: Yes

Other information
- Station code: KNR

History
- Opened: Blue Line 31 December 2005; 20 years ago Green Line 27 August 2011; 15 years ago
- Electrified: 25 kV 50 Hz AC through overhead catenary

Passengers
- October 2019: 53,885
- October 2023: 50,215 ▼6.8%

Services
Preceding station	Delhi Metro	Following station
Moti Nagar towards Dwarka Sector 21	Blue Line	Shadipur towards Noida Electronic City or Vaishali
Satguru Ram Singh Marg towards Brigadier Hoshiyar Singh	Green Line	Terminus
Route map
Location

The Kirti Nagar metro station is an interchange station between the Blue Line and Green Line of Delhi Metro. It is one of the eastward terminal stations of the Green Line, the other being Inderlok, and was opened as a part of a small 3.41 km (2.12 mi) branch from this station to Ashok Park Main station on 27 August 2011. This allowed passengers to easily transfer between the Red Line and Blue Line of the network.

The station serves the localities of Kirti Nagar, Moti Nagar, Shadipur, Naraina, and Karampura. Some recreational places near it include Moments mall, Furniture market, Sunday market, and BTW Kirti Nagar.

== Station layout ==
Station Layout Blue Line

P	Side platform | Doors will open on the left
P	Platform 1 Eastbound	Towards → Noida Electronic City or Vaishali; Next Station: Shadipur
P	Platform 2 Westbound	Towards ← Dwarka Sector 21; Next Station: Moti Nagar
P	Side platform | Doors will open on the left
C	Concourse	Fare control, station agent, metro card vending machines, crossover
G	Street Level	Gates

Station Layout Green Line

P	Side platform | Doors will open on the left
P	Platform 4 Eastbound	Towards → Train Terminates Here
P	Platform 3 Westbound	Towards ← Brigadier Hoshiyar Singh; Next Station: Satguru Ram Singh Marg
P	Side platform | Doors will open on the left
C	Concourse	Fare control, station agent, metro card vending machines, crossover
G	Street Level	Gates

== Facilities ==
The station has the following facilities:

- Currency chest: A Yes Bank currency chest in the outer area
- Food & beverages: Multiple establishments on the paid concourse and in the station's outer area
- Token vending and automatic vending machines: Multiple machines on the unpaid concourse
- Toilets: 2 toilets – both on the paid concourse
- Other services: An MTNL exchange in the outer area

== Entry/Exits ==
Kirti Nagar Station: Entry/Exits
Gate No-1
Furniture Market, Moments Mall

== Connections ==
=== Bus ===
- DTC buses: DTC bus routes numbers 72, 78, 78A, 78ASTL, 78STL, 83, 83A, 85, 85BEXT, 85EXT, 108, 114, 116B, 159, 159E, 160, 168, 187, 208, 316, 316A, 318, 408, 408CL, 408EXTCL, 408LSTL, 410, 410ACL, 410CL, 521, 725LSTL, 725STL, 752, 778, 807, 810, 810LSTL, 820, 842, 857, 859, 859A, 871, 871A, 892, 894, 894A, 894CL, 910, 910A, 930, 930A, 940, 940A, 940STL, 943, 944, 953, 953STL, 962, 962B, 970, 970A, 970B, 970C, 975, 980, 985, 990, 990A, 990B, 990CL, 990EXT, 991, and 997 serve the station from nearby Moti Nagar Industrial Area bus stop.

=== Metrolite ===
The Delhi Metrolite is a planned 19 km (12 mi) Metrolite system with 20 stations that will connect Kirti Nagar to Dwarka ECC via Mayapuri, Hari Nagar, Tihar Jail, and Dwarka Sector 2, Sector 7, Sector 6, Sector 20, and Sector 23. It will be designed as per MoHUA's Metrolite specifications, and will be much cheaper to construct because of its lower speeds and carrying capacities compared to regular metros. The detailed project report (DPR) for this line was approved by DMRC's board in October 2019, and is currently awaiting the Delhi Government's approval.

== See also ==
- List of Delhi Metro stations
- Transport in Delhi
