= List of railway stations in Delhi =

This is a list of the 46 railway stations in Delhi, India, including 21 on the Delhi Ring Railway.

== Categories ==
- There are four A-1 category railway stations in Delhi, out of total 75 in India.
- There are four A category railway stations in Delhi, out of total 332 in the country.
- There are 38 minor railway stations in Delhi.

Out of total 46 stations in Delhi, 21 stations are on the 35 km (22 mi) long Delhi Ring Railway that runs parallel to the Delhi Ring Road.

Station	Category	Note
Anand Vihar Terminal	A-1	
Delhi Junction	A-1	
Hazrat Nizamuddin	A-1	Delhi Ring Railway
New Delhi	A-1	Delhi Ring Railway
Adarsh Nagar	A	
Delhi Cantonment	A-1	
Delhi Sarai Rohilla	A-1	Delhi Ring Railway
Delhi Shahdara	A	
Azadpur	minor	
Badli	minor	
Bijwasan	minor	
Brar Square	minor	Delhi Ring Railway
Chanakyapuri	minor	Delhi Ring Railway
Dayabasti	minor	Delhi Ring Railway
Delhi Indrapuri	minor	Delhi Ring Railway
Delhi Kishanganj	minor	Delhi Ring Railway
Delhi Safdarjung	minor	Delhi Ring Railway
Ghevra	minor	
Gokulpuri Saboli Halt	minor	
Holambi Kalan	minor	
Khera Kalan	minor	
Kirti Nagar	minor	Delhi Ring Railway
Lajpat Nagar	minor	Delhi Ring Railway
Lodhi Colony	minor	Delhi Ring Railway
Mandawali-Chander Vihar	minor	
Mangolpuri	minor	
Mundka	minor	
Nangloi	minor	
Naraina Vihar	minor	Delhi Ring Railway
Narela	minor	
Okhla	minor	
Palam	minor	
Patel Nagar	minor	Delhi Ring Railway
Pragati Maidan	minor	Delhi Ring Railway
Sadar Bazar	minor	Delhi Ring Railway
Sardar Patel Marg	minor	Delhi Ring Railway
Sarojini Nagar	minor	Delhi Ring Railway
Sewa Nagar	minor	Delhi Ring Railway
Shahabad Mohammadpur	minor	
Shakur Basti	minor	
Shivaji Bridge	minor	Delhi Ring Railway
Subzi Mandi	minor	
Tilak Bridge	minor	Delhi Ring Railway
Tughlakabad	minor	
Vivekanand Puri	minor	
Vivek Vihar	minor	

== Delhi Ring Railway ==
The Delhi Ring Railway stations are listed in a clockwise direction, starting from Hazrat Nizamuddin:

- Hazrat Nizamuddin
- Lajpat Nagar
- Sewa Nagar
- Lodhi Colony
- Sarojini Nagar
- Delhi Safdarjung
- Chanakyapuri
- Sardar Patel Marg
- Barar Square
- Delhi Indrapuri
- Naraina Vihar
- Kirti Nagar
- Patel Nagar
- Dayabasti
- Delhi Sarai Rohilla
- Delhi Kishanganj
- Sadar Bazar
- New Delhi
- Shivaji Bridge
- Tilak Bridge
- Pragati Maidan

== See also ==
- Northern Railway Zone
- Delhi railway division
- Delhi Suburban Railway
