= Naya Azadpur railway station =

Railway station in India

General information
- Location: Naya Azadpur, North West Delhi district India
- Elevation: 213 m (699 ft)
- System: Indian Railways station
- Owner: Indian Railways
- Operator: Delhi railway division
- Line: Delhi Ring Railway
- Platforms: 4 BG
- Tracks: 6 BG
- Connections: Taxi stand, auto stand

Construction
- Structure type: Standard (on-ground station)
- Parking: Available
- Cycle facilities: Available
- Accessible: Disabled access

Other information
- Station code: NDAZ
- Fare zone: Northern Railways

Services
Preceding station	Indian Railways	Following station
Badli towards ?	Northern Railway zone Delhi Ring Railway	Azadpur towards ?
Location
- Location within India Location within Delhi

Naya Azadpur railway station is a small railway station in Naya Azadpur which is a residential and commercial neighborhood of the North West Delhi district of Delhi. Its code is NDAZ. The station is part of Delhi Suburban Railway. The station consist of four platforms, none well sheltered. It lacks many facilities including water and sanitation.

== See also ==
Delhi travel guide from Wikivoyage

- Hazrat Nizamuddin railway station
- New Delhi railway station
- Delhi Junction railway station
- Anand Vihar Terminal railway station
- Delhi Sarai Rohilla railway station
- Delhi Metro
