= Delhi Ring Railway =

Railway line in Delhi

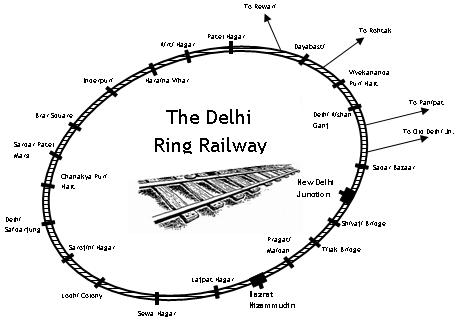

Overview
- Locale: Delhi, India
- Termini: Hazrat Nizamuddin; Hazrat Nizamuddin

Service
- Type: Suburban Rail
- System: Delhi Suburban Railway
- Operator: Northern Railway
- Daily ridership: 3,700

History
- Opened: 1975

Technical
- Line length: 35 km (22 mi)
- Character: At-grade
- Track gauge: 5 ft 6 in (1,676 mm) Broad gauge

The Delhi Ring railway, part of Delhi Suburban Railway, was a 35 kilometres (22 mi) circular railway network in Delhi with 21 stations that runs parallel to the Inner Ring Road. Operational from 8 am to 7 pm, it offers clockwise and anti-clockwise services via Hazrat Nizamuddin Railway Station, completing a full circuit in 90–120 minutes. During peak hours, it has seven clockwise and six anti-clockwise trains, maintaining a 60–90 minute frequency. With a full-circuit fare of approximately ₹12 (12¢ US), significantly lower than the Delhi Metro's ₹60 (62¢ US), it serves as a cost-effective transit option. It was laid in 1975 primarily to service freight trains that could bypass the crowded and passenger-heavy Old Delhi and New Delhi railway stations.

== History ==
The ring-railway service was introduced in 1975 with a stretch from Lajpat Nagar station to Adarsh Nagar station via Delhi Safdarjung and Patel Nagar stations so that the large number of goods trains originating, terminating, or passing through the city, could bypass the main passenger stations at New Delhi, Old Delhi and Hazrat Nizamuddin. Hence, the track was named the 'Delhi Avoiding Line'. It was during the 1982 Asian Games that the service was extended to cater to the movement of people with the introduction of 24 new services.

Prior to the 2010 Commonwealth Games, seven stations near the sports venues, namely Chanakyapuri, Sarojini Nagar, Inderpuri Halt, Lajpat Nagar, Sewa Nagar, Lodhi Colony and Safdarjung, received a facelift at the cost of ₹3 crore (US$312,000).

Today, however, the Northern Railway's service for passengers within the city has become something which Delhiites are avoiding. As of July 2021, nine services were operational on the line in the clockwise and anti-clock-wise directions, with four express/mail and five passenger trains. The average peak hour occupancy of passenger trains is 50 per cent, while their average daily occupancy is 30 per cent. The ridership numbers hover around 3500-4000 per day. In 2018, the Ministry of Railways announced plans to integrate the ring railway into the Delhi Metro system through interchanges and convert it into a robust suburban rail system.

== Stations ==
List of the 21 railway stations in clockwise direction (starting from Hazrat Nizamuddin) is as follows:

Station name	Note
Hazrat Nizamuddin	Interchange with Hazrat Nizamuddin railway station, the Sarai Kale Khan ISBT and the Sarai Kale Khan - Nizamuddin metro station on the Pink Line
Lajpat Nagar	Interchange with Lajpat Nagar metro station on the Violet Line and Pink Line and the Jangpura metro station on the Violet Line
Sewa Nagar	
Lodhi Colony	
Sarojini Nagar	
Delhi Safdarjung	
Chanakyapuri	
Sardar Patel Marg	
Barar Square	
Indrapuri	
Naraina Vihar	Interchange with Naraina Vihar metro station on the Pink Line
Kirti Nagar	Interchange with Kirti Nagar metro station on the Green Line
Patel Nagar	Interchange with Satguru Ram Singh Marg metro station on the Green Line
Daya Basti	
Delhi Sarai Rohilla	Interchange with Shastri Nagar metro station on the Red Line
Delhi Kishanganj	
Sadar Bazar	Interchange with Tis Hazari metro station on the Red Line
New Delhi	Interchange with New Delhi metro station on the Yellow Line and the Airport Express
Shivaji Bridge	
Tilak Bridge	
Pragati Maidan	Interchange with Supreme Court metro station (erstwhile Pragati Maidan) on the Blue Line

== Popularity ==
The ring railway service was quite popular through the 1980s and '90s when Delhi's transport infrastructure was just gathering pace, but since then, with the rapid expansion of the Delhi Metro coupled with an extensive bus network and more recently, the opening of the RRTS, the ring railway has remained neglected by the city as well as the Railways. On average, only 3,700 passengers take the trains every day. The biggest reason for the failure of the railway is a lack of a feeder network, such as approach roads and feeder buses to the stations. The stations are situated at remote locations and are difficult to access by passengers. There is also a problem of security as many stations have been encroached. The trains on this network also run behind schedule most of the time. The network is now utilized as a freight corridor and limited passenger train services are available during peak hours.

=== Plans for Revival ===
The Master Plan for Delhi, 2041 (MPD 2041), recommends that the ridership numbers of the ring railway can be increased by implementing accessibility improvements for major halt stations by creating public plazas, providing walking and cycling infrastructure, and installing proper signage. Interchange facilities may also be planned to integrate ring rail stations with existing metro stations. Additionally, since the ring rail alignment connects areas of heritage, ecological assets of Delhi and many commercial areas, a special hop-on and hop-off service may be considered for movement of tourists.

== See also ==
- Delhi Suburban Railway
- Delhi Metro
