= Okhla railway station =

Railway Station in Delhi, India

Okhla

General information
- Location: Okhla Subzi Mandi, Ishwar Nagar Mathura Road, NCT; India
- Coordinates: 28.5594°N 77.2655°E
- Elevation: 217 m (712 ft)
- System: Indian Railway and Delhi Suburban Railway station
- Owner: Indian Railways
- Operator: Northern Railway
- Platforms: 4 BG
- Tracks: 7 BG
- Connections: Taxi stand, auto stand

Construction
- Structure type: Standard (on ground station)
- Parking: Available
- Cycle facilities: Available
- Accessible: Disabled access

Other information
- Status: Functioning
- Station code: OKA
- Zone(s): Northern Railway
- Division(s): Delhi railway division

Services
Preceding station	Indian Railways	Following station
Hazrat Nizamuddin towards ?	Northern Railway zone Delhi Ring Railway	Lajpat Nagar towards ?
Location
- Location within India Location within Haryana

Okhla railway station is a railway station in Okhla which is a residential and commercial neighborhood of South East Delhi area of Delhi. Its code is OKA. The station is part of the Delhi Suburban Railway. The station consists of four platforms. The platforms are not well sheltered. It lacks many facilities including water and sanitation. Station is located just behind the Okhla subzi mandi and play a vital role of transportation for vendors who trade vegetable and fruits.

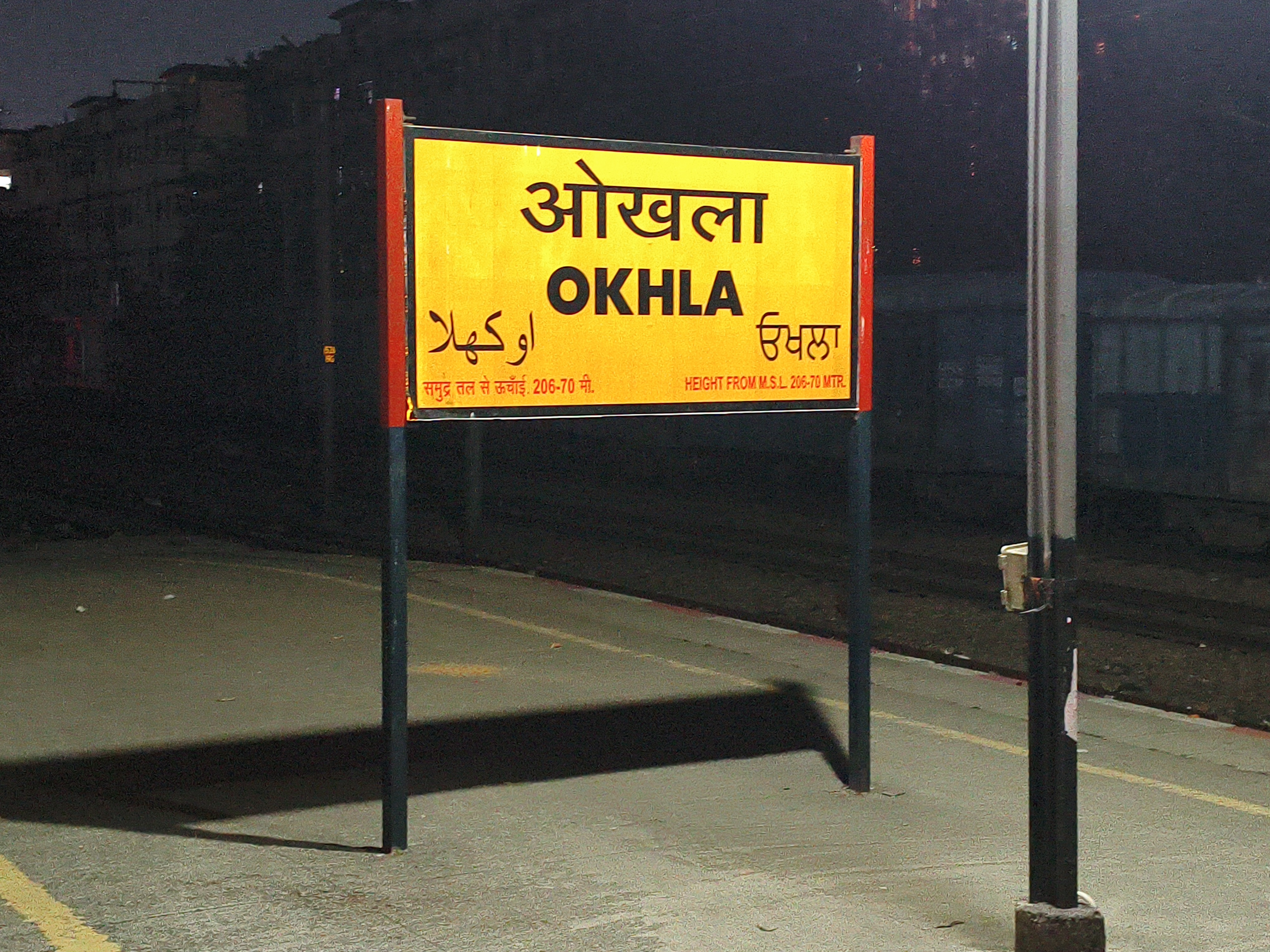
Okhla railway station sign board

== Trains ==
Some of the trains that runs from Okhla are:

- Agra Cantt. – New Delhi Intercity Express
- Agra Cantt. – Nizamuddin MEMU
- Agra Cantt. – Old Delhi Passenger
- Andaman Express
- Hazrat Nizamuddin – Kosi Kalan Passenger
- Hazrat Nizamuddin – Palwal MEMU
- Mandsor – Meerut City Link Express
- Bandra Terminus- Dehradun Express
- Firozpur Janta Express
- Udyan Abha Toofan Express

== See also ==
- Hazrat Nizamuddin railway station
- New Delhi Railway Station
- Delhi Junction Railway station
- Anand Vihar Railway Terminal
- Sarai Rohilla Railway Station
- Delhi Metro

Delhi travel guide from Wikivoyage
