= Adarsh Nagar railway station =

Railway station in Delhi, India

Adarsh Nagar

General information
- Location: Adarsh Nagar, North West Delhi; India
- Coordinates: 28.7166°N 77.1704°E
- Elevation: 215 m (705 ft)
- System: Indian Railways and Delhi Suburban Railway station
- Owner: Ministry of Railways (India)
- Operator: Indian Railways
- Line: Delhi Ring Railway
- Platforms: 2 BG
- Tracks: 4 BG
- Connections: Yellow Line Adarsh Nagar

Construction
- Structure type: At grade
- Parking: Available
- Cycle facilities: Available
- Accessible: Disabled access

Other information
- Status: Active
- Station code: ANDI
- Zone(s): Northern Railway
- Division(s): Delhi

Services
Preceding station	Indian Railways	Following station
Badli towards ?	Northern Railway zone Delhi Ring Railway	Naya Azadpur towards ?
Location

Adarsh Nagar railway station is a small railway station in Adarsh Nagar, a residential and commercial neighborhood of the North West Delhi district of Delhi. Its code is ANDI. The station is part of Delhi Suburban Railway. The station consist of 4 platforms. The platform is not well sheltered. It lacks many facilities including Water and Sanitation. Adarsh Nagar metro station of Yellow Line (Delhi Metro) is a short walk (500-550 metre) from this station.

== Major trains ==
- New Delhi–Kurukshetra MEMU
- Jammu Mail
- Kalka Mail
- Delhi Panipat MEMU
- Panipat Ghaziabad MEMU
- Poorabiya Express
- Delhi Kalka Passenger
- Lokmanya Tilak Terminus Amritsar Express

== See also ==
- Adarsh Nagar metro station
- Hazrat Nizamuddin railway station
- New Delhi railway station
- Delhi Junction railway station
- Anand Vihar Terminal railway station
- Delhi Sarai Rohilla railway station
- Delhi Metro
