= Palam railway station =

Railway station in Delhi, India

Palam
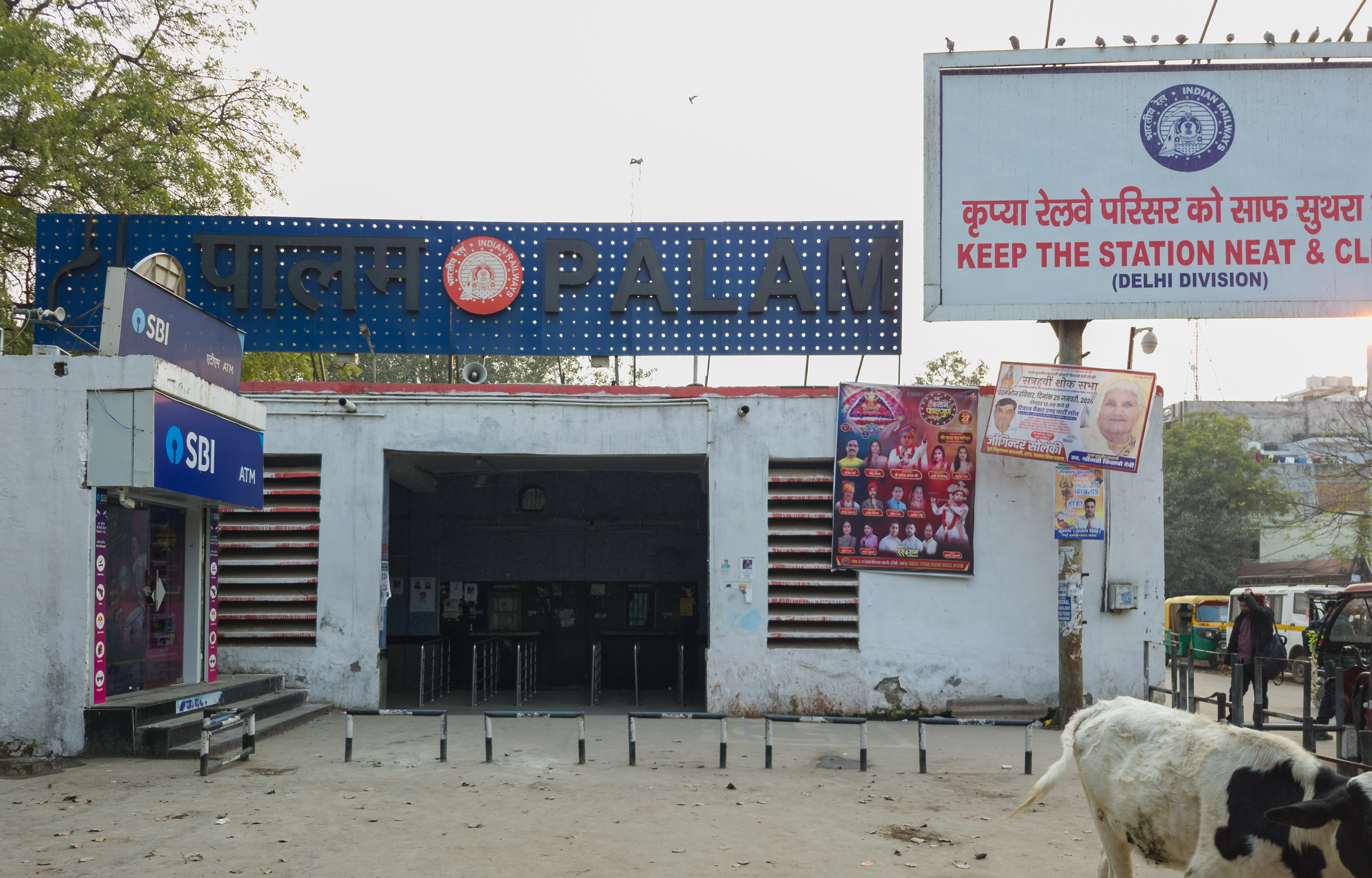

General information
- Location: Raj Nagar I, Palam, New Delhi, Delhi, 110045; India
- Coordinates: 28.5852°N 77.0928°E
- Elevation: 108 metres (354 ft)
- System: Indian Railway and Delhi Suburban Railway station
- Owner: Indian Railways
- Operator: Northern Railway
- Line: Delhi Ring Railway
- Platforms: 3
- Tracks: 4 (construction – doubling of electrified BG)
- Connections: Auto stand

Construction
- Structure type: Standard (on-ground station)
- Parking: Yes
- Cycle facilities: No

Other information
- Status: Functioning (construction – doubling of electrified BG)
- Station code: PM
- Zone(s): Northern Railway
- Division(s): Delhi

Services
Preceding station	Indian Railways	Following station
Shahabad Mohammadpur towards ?	Northern Railway zone Delhi Ring Railway	Nasirpur Halt towards ?
Location
- Location within India Location within Delhi

Palam railway station is a small railway station in Palam which is a residential and commercial neighborhood of the South West Delhi of Delhi. Its code is PM. The station is part of Delhi Suburban Railway. The station consists of three platforms. The platform is not well sheltered. It lacks many facilities including water and sanitation.

== Trains ==
The following trains run from Palam railway station :

- Ala Hazrat Express
- Ala Hazrat Express (via Bhildi)
- Delhi–Farukh Nagar Passenger (unreserved)
- Delhi–Barmer Link Express
- Delhi–Rewari Passenger (unreserved)
- Delhi Sarai Rohilla–Farukhnagar Passenger
- Delhi Sarai Rohilla–Rewari Passenger (unreserved)
- Delhi Sarai Rohilla–Porbandar Express
- Delhi–Rewari Passenger (unreserved)
- Farukhnagar–Saharanpur Janta Express (unreserved)
- Malani Express
- Mandore Express
- Meerut Cantt.– Rewari Passenger (unreserved)
- Tilak Bridge–Rewari Jn. Passenger (unreserved)

== See also ==
- Hazrat Nizamuddin railway station
- New Delhi railway station
- Delhi Junction Railway station
- Anand Vihar Railway Terminal
- Sarai Rohilla railway station
- Delhi Metro
