= Minto Bridge =

Heritage railway underbridge in New Delhi

Shivaji Bridge
- Coordinates: 28°38′1″N 77°13′2″E
- Carries: Trains
- ID number: Q113570344

Rail characteristics
- Track gauge: 5 ft 6 in gauge railway| Broad Gauge
- Electrified: Yes

History
- Built: Disputed

Location
- Interactive map of Shivaji Bridge

An Indian Railways underpass connecting Shivaji Bridge Railway Station to New Delhi Railway StationMinto Bridge is a railway underbridge in New Delhi.

Vivekananda Road, once known as Minto Road, passes under the bridge, connecting Connaught Place to the Ajmeri Gate side of the New Delhi Railway Station and Old Delhi. Journalist and chronicler RV Smith places the date of construction as 1933. AK Jain, an architect and a planner at Delhi Development Authority, places the construction to 1926. It was built to carry a new railway line to New Delhi railway station. It is now a heritage structure; this designation comes into light during plans to redevelop the area. The bridge is named after Gilbert Elliot-Murray-Kynynmound, 4th Earl of Minto who was the viceroy and governor-general of India from 1905 to 1910. It was renamed Shivaji Bridge however the old name is more commonly used. The now shut restaurants 'Blue Star' and 'Splash Bar & Restaurant' were located in its vicinity.

The underpass is known to face waterlogging since India's independence.
