= Khera Khurd =

Khera Khurd Chota Khera
- Village
- Nickname: Chota Khera
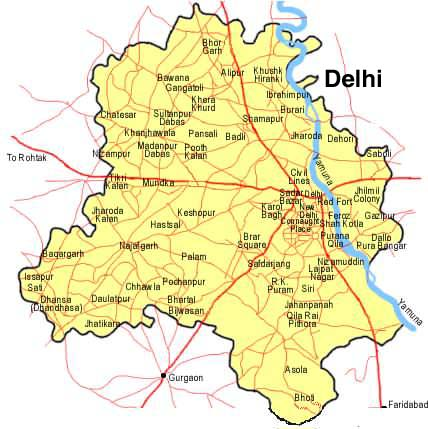
- Khera Khurd Village located in North Delhi district in Delhi

- Location in Delhi, India
- Coordinates: 28.77806°N 77.09882°E
- Country: India
- Union Territory: Delhi
- District: North Delhi
- Tehsil: Narela
- Assembly constituency: Narela

Government
  - Type: Municipal Corporation
  - Body: Municipal Corporation of Delhi

Area
  - Total: 6 km^{2} (2.3 sq mi)

Population (2011)
  - Total: 8,813
  - Density: 1,500/km^{2} (3,800/sq mi)

Languages
  - Official: Hindi, English, Haryanvi
- Time zone: UTC+5:30 (IST)
- Website: www.dmrceu.org

Khera Khurd is a village in Narela subdivision in North Delhi district in the Indian union territory of Delhi. It is also known as Mann Khera or Chota Khera. The nearest railway station is Khera Kalan railway station. Narela is the nearest town and Rohini is the nearest urbanised area. It falls under the Narela assembly constituency.

== Demographics ==
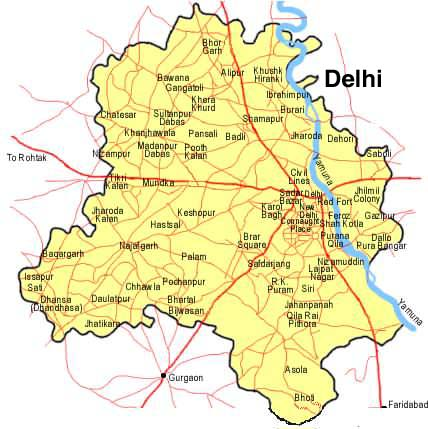
Map of Delhi showing location of Khera Khurd

Historical population
Year	Pop.	±%
2001	8,817	—
2011	9,777	+10.9%
Source: Government of India

As of 2001 India census, Khera Khurd had a population of 8813. Males constitute 56% of the population and females 44%. In Khera Khurd, 13% of the population is under 6 years of age. Haryanvi is the local language.

== Politics ==
The Indian National Congress, Bharatiya Janata Party, Bahujan Samaj Party, and the Aam Aadmi Party are the major political parties.
