= Jahangirpuri metro station =

Metro station in Delhi, India

Jahangirpuri

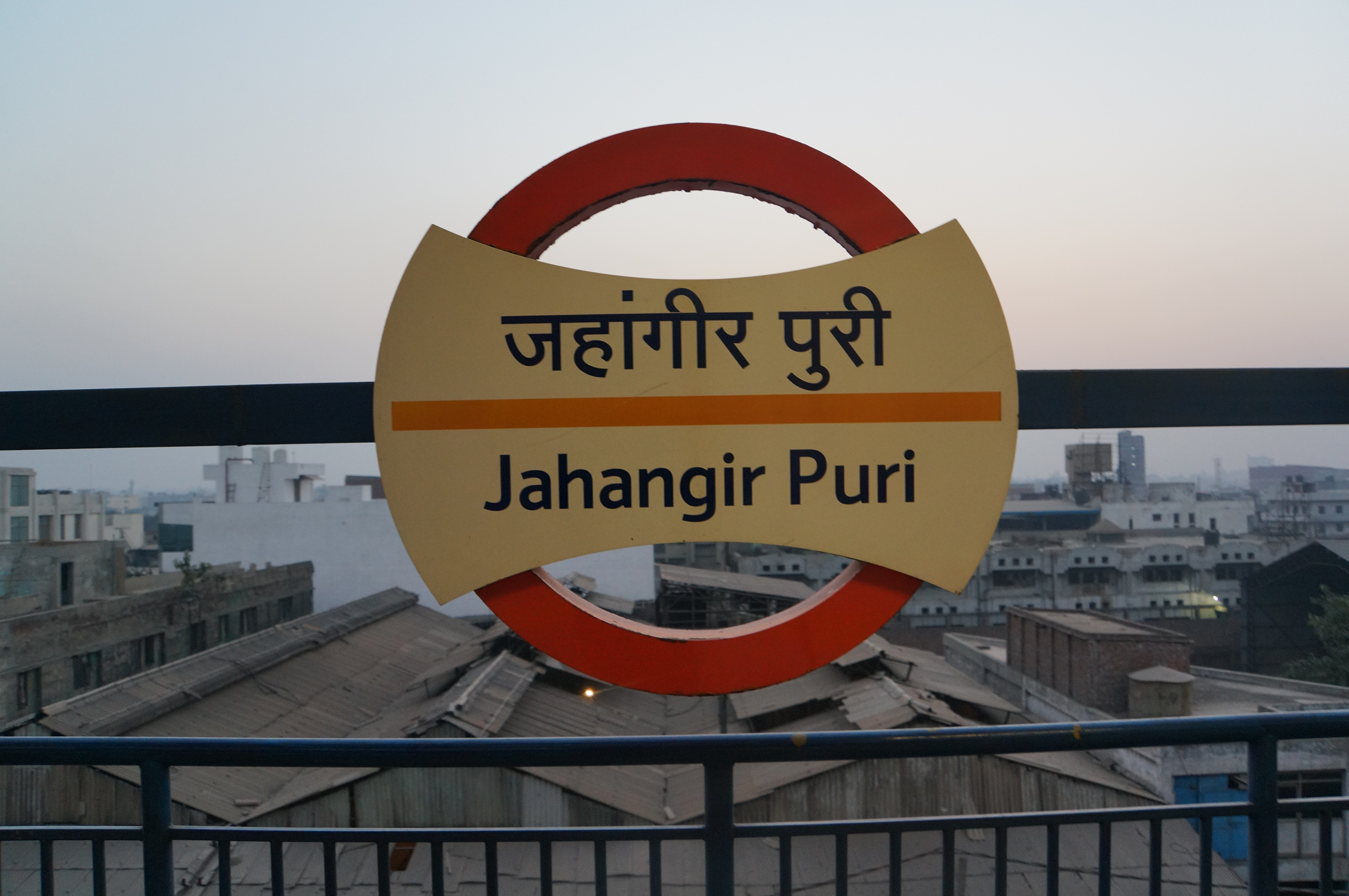

General information
- Location: Grand Trunk Rd, Jahangirpuri, New Delhi, 110033; India
- Coordinates: 28°43′33″N 77°09′46″E
- System: Delhi Metro station
- Owner: Delhi Metro
- Operator: Delhi Metro Rail Corporation (DMRC)
- Line: Yellow Line
- Platforms: Side platform; Platform-1 → Millennium City Centre Gurugram; Platform-2 → Samaypur Badli
- Tracks: 2

Construction
- Structure type: Elevated, Double-track
- Platform levels: 2
- Parking: Available
- Accessible: Yes

Other information
- Status: Staffed, Operational
- Station code: JGPI

History
- Opened: 4 February 2009; 17 years ago
- Electrified: 25 kV 50 Hz AC through overhead catenary

Passengers
- Jan 2015: 892,954; 28,805 Daily Average

Services
Preceding station	Delhi Metro	Following station
Haiderpur Badli Mor towards Samaypur Badli	Yellow Line	Adarsh Nagar towards Millennium City Centre Gurugram
Route map
Location

The Jahangirpuri metro station is located on the Yellow Line of the Delhi Metro. It was the terminal station of the Yellow Line till 9 November 2015.

== Station layout ==
L2	Side platform | Doors will open on the left
L2	Platform 1 Southbound	Towards → Millennium City Centre Gurugram; Next Station: Adarsh Nagar
L2	Platform 2 Northbound	Towards ← Samaypur Badli; Next Station: Haiderpur Badli Mor
L2	Side platform | Doors will open on the left
L1	Concourse	Fare control, station agent, Metro Card vending machines, crossover
G	Street Level	Exit/Entrance

== Entry/exit ==
Jahangirpuri station Entry/exits
Gate No-1	Gate No-2	Gate No-3	Gate No-4
Jahangirpuri Ram Garh	Jahangirpuri Mahendra Park	Rajasthan Udyog Nagar	Jahangirpuri Industrial Area
DDA Flats	DDA Flats		

== Connections ==
Delhi Transport Corporation bus routes number 17, 19, 19A, 19B, 100, 100A, 100EXT, 101A, 101B, 101EXT, 103, 103EXT, 103STL, 106, 106A, 107, 109, 112, 113, 113EXT, 116, 119, 120, 120A, 120B, 123, 124, 125, 128, 129, 130, 131, 134, 135, 136, 137, 138, 140, 142, 142A, 144, 146, 147, 148, 149, 154, 159, 169, 169SPL, 171, 172, 173, 175, 177, 179, 181, 181A, 191, 193, 194, 195, 199, 259, 333, 341, 804, 804A, 861, 883, 982, 982LSTL, GMS(+)(-) serves the station.

== See also ==
- List of Delhi Metro stations
- Transport in Delhi
- Delhi Metro Rail Corporation
- Delhi Suburban Railway
- Delhi Transport Corporation
- North Delhi
- National Capital Region (India)
- List of rapid transit systems
- List of metro systems
