= Jwala Heri =

JwalaHeri is an old village & a very famous market in Paschim Vihar in Delhi, India. It is the heart of Paschim Vihar and is the biggest market in West Delhi. It sells everything from food and clothes to computers and jewellery. Though an extremely congested market, it has the benefits of bargaining as its main attraction. A newly opened Tibetan Market constructed on the lines of famous Tibetan markets of hill stations further north is also a place where you can get cheap clothes and electronic goods(p.s.- now closed). Well known shops and stores in Jwala Heri:

- Temples: Prachin Shiv Temple, Laxmi Narayan Temple
- Sweets: Kumar Sweets, Aggarwal Sweets
- Restaurants: Jugal Bandi
- Men's Fashion Wear: Cobb, Malhotra's, Jaisons, Cantabil
- Women's Fashion Wear: Malhotra Garments, Adhuna, Nupur Sarees
- Branded Stores : Malhotra's, Lotto, Wrangler, Bata, VIP, Duke, etc.
- Books and Stationery : Rajesh Pustak Bhandar, Nitin Books and Stationers
- Clinics :PUHC Paschim Vihar, MCW Centre Jwalaheri, PsyClinic - Center for Healing Minds (mental health treatment)
- Crockery Showroom, Home & Kitchen Store - Mahavir Crockery

Jwala Heri Market is accessible by the nearby Paschim Vihar West metro station, which is just a kilometer away. It is also accessible from Punjabi Bagh, Shivaji Park, Paschim Puri, Paschim Enclave, Madipur, Bhera Enclave, Mianwali Nagar, New Multan Nagar, Peeragarhi, National Market, Udyog Nagar and Nangloi respectively, via metro, auto rickshaws, cycle rickshaws and battery-operated rickshaws as well.
