= Delhi Safdarjung railway station =

Railway station in Delhi, India

Delhi Safdarjung Dilli Safdarjung

General information
- Location: Safdarjung, South Delhi district, National Capital Territory; India
- Coordinates: 28.5824°N 77.1859°E
- Elevation: 503 m (1,650 ft)
- System: Indian Railway and Delhi Suburban Railway station
- Owner: Indian Railways
- Line: Delhi Ring Railway
- Platforms: 3 BG
- Tracks: 6 BG
- Connections: Taxi stand, auto stand

Construction
- Structure type: Standard (on-ground station)
- Parking: Available
- Cycle facilities: Available
- Accessible: Disabled access

Other information
- Station code: DSJ
- Fare zone: Northern Railways

Services
Preceding station	Indian Railways	Following station
Chanakyapuri towards ?	Northern Railway zone Delhi Ring Railway	Sarojini Nagar towards ?
Location
- Location within India Location within Haryana

Delhi Safdarjung railway station is a small railway station in Safdarjung which is a residential and commercial neighborhood of the South Delhi district of Delhi. Its code is DSJ. The station is part of Delhi Suburban Railway. The station consist of three platforms. The station is close to the RLDA (Railway Land Development Authority) headquarter and AIIMS Delhi.

== History ==
In 2025-26, the station underwent ₹385 crore major redevelopment, with target completion date of mid-2026, to a world-class transit hub with airport-style new multi-story station building with shopping areas, restaurants, and hotels, multi-level parking and a focus on creating a multi-modal transport hub and to enhance its role as a key transit point for luxury tourist trains such as the Palace on Wheels and the Maharaja Express.

== Trains ==
- Patalkot Express
- Durg–Jammu Tawi Superfast Express
- Indore–Jammu Tawi Weekly Superfast Express
- Tirupati–Jammu Tawi Humsafar Express
- Firozpur Cantt. - Hazur Sahib Nanded Weekly Express
- Ramayana Express

== See also ==
Delhi travel guide from Wikivoyage

- Hazrat Nizamuddin railway station
- New Delhi railway station
- Delhi Junction railway station
- Anand Vihar Terminal railway station
- Delhi Sarai Rohilla railway station
- Delhi Metro
