= Lodhi Colony railway station =

Delhi ring railway network station

Lodhi Colony

General information
- Location: Najafkhan Road, NCT; India
- Coordinates: 28.5798°N 77.2169°E
- Elevation: 218 m (715 ft)
- System: Indian Railway and Delhi Suburban Railway station
- Owner: Indian Railways
- Operator: Northern Railway
- Platforms: 4 BG
- Tracks: 12 BG
- Connections: Taxi stand, auto stand

Construction
- Structure type: Standard (on ground station)
- Parking: Available
- Cycle facilities: Available
- Accessible: Disabled access

Other information
- Status: Functioning
- Station code: LDCY
- Zone(s): Northern Railway
- Division(s): Delhi railway division

Services
Preceding station	Indian Railways	Following station
Sewa Nagar towards ?	Northern Railway zone Delhi Ring Railway	Sarojini Nagar towards ?
Location
- Location within India Location within Haryana

Lodhi colony railway station is a small railway station in Lodhi colony which is a residential and commercial neighborhood in the South Delhi area of Delhi. Its code is LDCY. The station is part of Delhi Suburban Railway. The station consists of two platforms. Presently no passenger trains stop at this station.

== See also ==
- Lodhi Road
- Lodhi Colony
- Lodhi Garden
- Hazrat Nizamuddin railway station
- New Delhi Railway Station
- Delhi Junction Railway station
- Anand Vihar Railway Terminal
- Sarai Rohilla Railway Station
- Delhi Metro
