= Madipur metro station =

Metro station in Delhi, India

Madipur

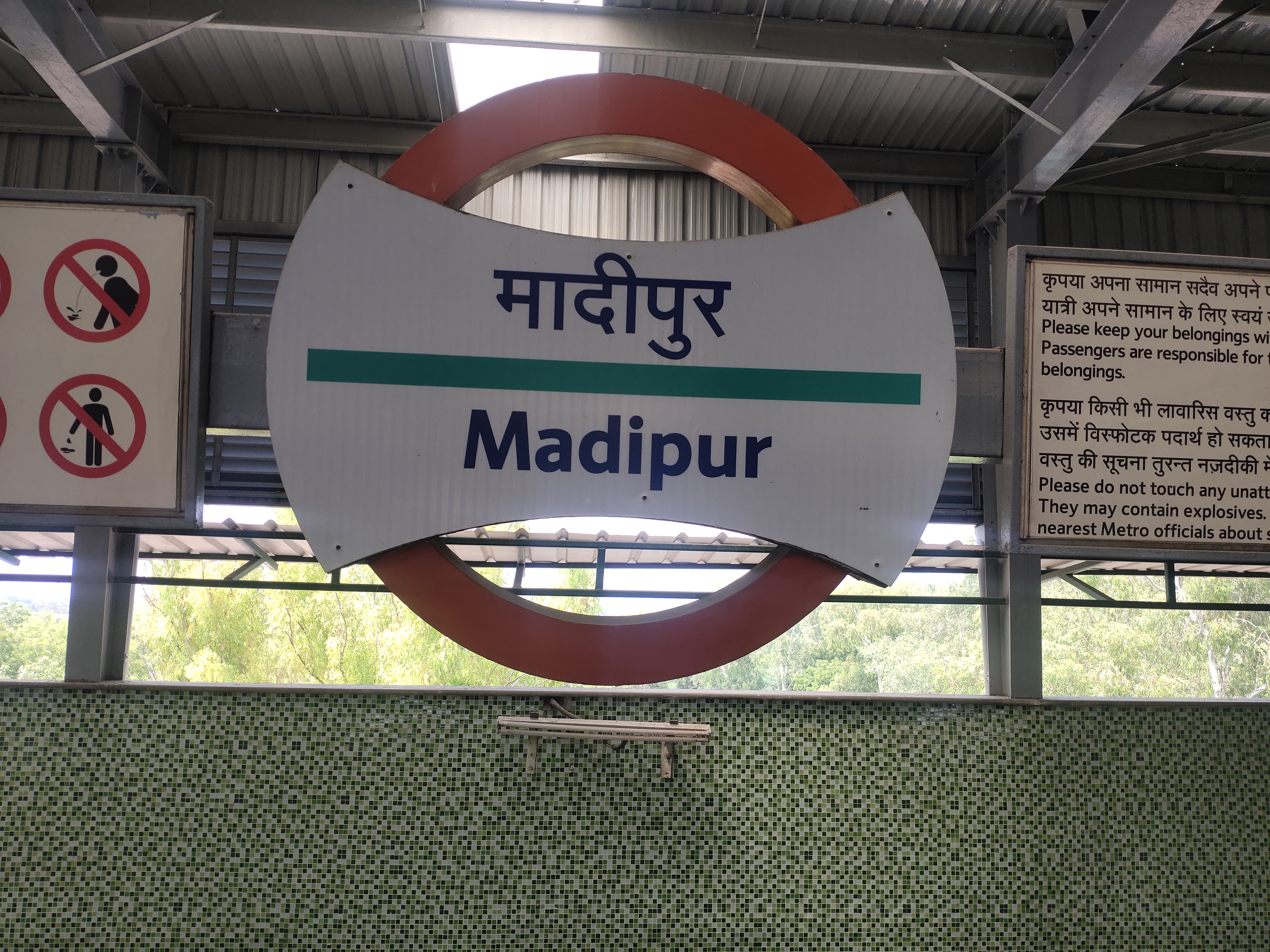

General information
- Coordinates: 28°40′35″N 77°07′11″E
- System: Delhi Metro station
- Owner: Delhi Metro
- Line: Green Line
- Platforms: Side platform; Platform-1 → Brigadier Hoshiyar Singh; Platform-2 → Inderlok / Kirti Nagar
- Tracks: 2

Construction
- Structure type: Elevated
- Platform levels: 2
- Parking: Available
- Accessible: Yes

Other information
- Station code: MAPR

History
- Opened: 2 April 2010; 16 years ago
- Electrified: 25 kV 50 Hz AC through overhead catenary

Passengers
- Jan 2015: 4,942 /day 153,195/ Month average

Services
Preceding station	Delhi Metro	Following station
Paschim Vihar East towards Brigadier Hoshiyar Singh	Green Line	Shivaji Park towards Inderlok or Kirti Nagar
Route map
Location

Madipur is a station on the Green Line of the Delhi Metro and is located in the West Delhi district of Delhi. It is an elevated station and was inaugurated on 2 April 2010. It is named after Madipur village which is a big village of people from Yadav community.

== Station layout ==
L2	Side platform | Doors will open on the left
L2	Platform 2 Eastbound	Towards → Inderlok / Kirti Nagar; Next Station: Shivaji Park
L2	Platform 1 Westbound	Towards ← Brigadier Hoshiyar Singh; Next Station: Paschim Vihar East
L2	Side platform | Doors will open on the left
L1	Concourse	Fare control, station agent, Metro Card vending machines, crossover
G	Street level	Exit/Entrance

== Facilities ==
List of available One artpiece shop

== See also ==
- List of Delhi Metro stations
- Transport in Delhi
- Delhi Metro Rail Corporation
- Delhi Suburban Railway
- List of rapid transit systems in India
