= Khera Kalan railway station =

Railway station in Delhi, India

Khera Kalan

General information
- Location: Khera Kalan, South Delhi district, National Capital Territory; India
- Coordinates: 28.7696°N 77.1158°E
- Elevation: 215 m (705 ft)
- System: Indian Railway and Delhi Suburban Railway station
- Owner: Indian Railways
- Operator: Delhi
- Lines: Delhi–Kalka line Delhi Suburban Railway
- Platforms: 3 BG
- Tracks: 6 BG
- Connections: Taxi stand, auto stand

Construction
- Structure type: Standard (on ground station)
- Parking: Available
- Cycle facilities: Available
- Accessible: Disabled access

Other information
- Status: Active
- Station code: KHKN
- Fare zone: Northern Railways

Services
Preceding station	Indian Railways	Following station
Chanakyapuri towards ?	Northern Railway zone Delhi Ring Railway	Sarojini Nagar towards ?
Location
- Location within India Location within Delhi

Khera Kalan railway station is a small railway station in Khera Kalan which is a residential and commercial neighborhood of the North Delhi district of Delhi. Its code is KHKN. The station is part of Delhi Suburban Railway. The station consists of two platforms, neither well sheltered. It lacks many facilities including Water and Sanitation.

== Trains ==
- Delhi Panipat Passenger
- Delhi Kalka Passenger (unreserved)
- Delhi Panipat Passenger
- Ghaziabad Panipat MEMU
- Kurukshetra – Old Delhi MEMU
- Kurukshetra Delhi MEMU
- Kurukshetra Hazrat Nizamuddin MEMU

== See also ==
Delhi travel guide from Wikivoyage

- Hazrat Nizamuddin railway station
- New Delhi Railway Station
- Delhi Junction Railway station
- Anand Vihar Railway Terminal
- Sarai Rohilla Railway Station
- Delhi Metro
