= Mangolpur Kalan =

Village in India

Coordinates: 28°41′30″N 77°05′20″E

Mangolpur Kalan is a village located in Sector 2, Rohini in North West Delhi district of Delhi, India. This village is about 1000 years old. The population of this village is more than 13,000 and this village was urbanized during the 1980s and lies on North-west region of Delhi. It has a very famous 'Kali Mata Mandir' where devotees come from all across India. It is believed that Mangol Pur Kalan village is the origin of the idol of 'Sheetla Mata' in Gurgaon.
