= Paschim Vihar East metro station =

Metro station in Delhi, India

Paschim Vihar East

General information
- Coordinates: 28°40′38″N 77°06′45″E
- System: Delhi Metro station
- Owner: Delhi Metro
- Line: Green Line
- Platforms: Side platform; Platform-1 → Brigadier Hoshiyar Singh; Platform-2 → Inderlok / Kirti Nagar
- Tracks: 2

Construction
- Structure type: Elevated
- Platform levels: 2
- Parking: Available
- Accessible: Yes

Other information
- Station code: PVE

History
- Opened: 2 April 2010; 16 years ago
- Electrified: 25 kV 50 Hz AC through overhead catenary

Passengers
- Jan 2015: 5,495 /day 170,340/ Month average

Services
Preceding station	Delhi Metro	Following station
Paschim Vihar West towards Brigadier Hoshiyar Singh	Green Line	Madipur towards Inderlok or Kirti Nagar
Route map
Location

Paschim Vihar East is a station on the Green Line of the Delhi Metro and is located in the West Delhi district of Delhi. It is an elevated station and was inaugurated on 2 April 2010. This metro station is just opposite the Bharati Vidyapeeth Deemed University (New Delhi Campus).

== Station layout ==
L2	Side platform | Doors will open on the left
L2	Platform 2 Eastbound	Towards → Inderlok / Kirti Nagar; Next Station: Madipur
L2	Platform 1 Westbound	Towards ← Brigadier Hoshiyar Singh; Next Station: Paschim Vihar West
L2	Side platform | Doors will open on the left
L1	Concourse	Fare control, station agent, Metro Card vending machines, crossover
G	Street level	Exit/Entrance

== See also ==
- List of Delhi Metro stations
- Transport in Delhi
- Delhi Metro Rail Corporation
- Delhi Suburban Railway
- List of rapid transit systems in India
