= Paschim Vihar West metro station =

Metro station in Delhi, India

Paschim Vihar West

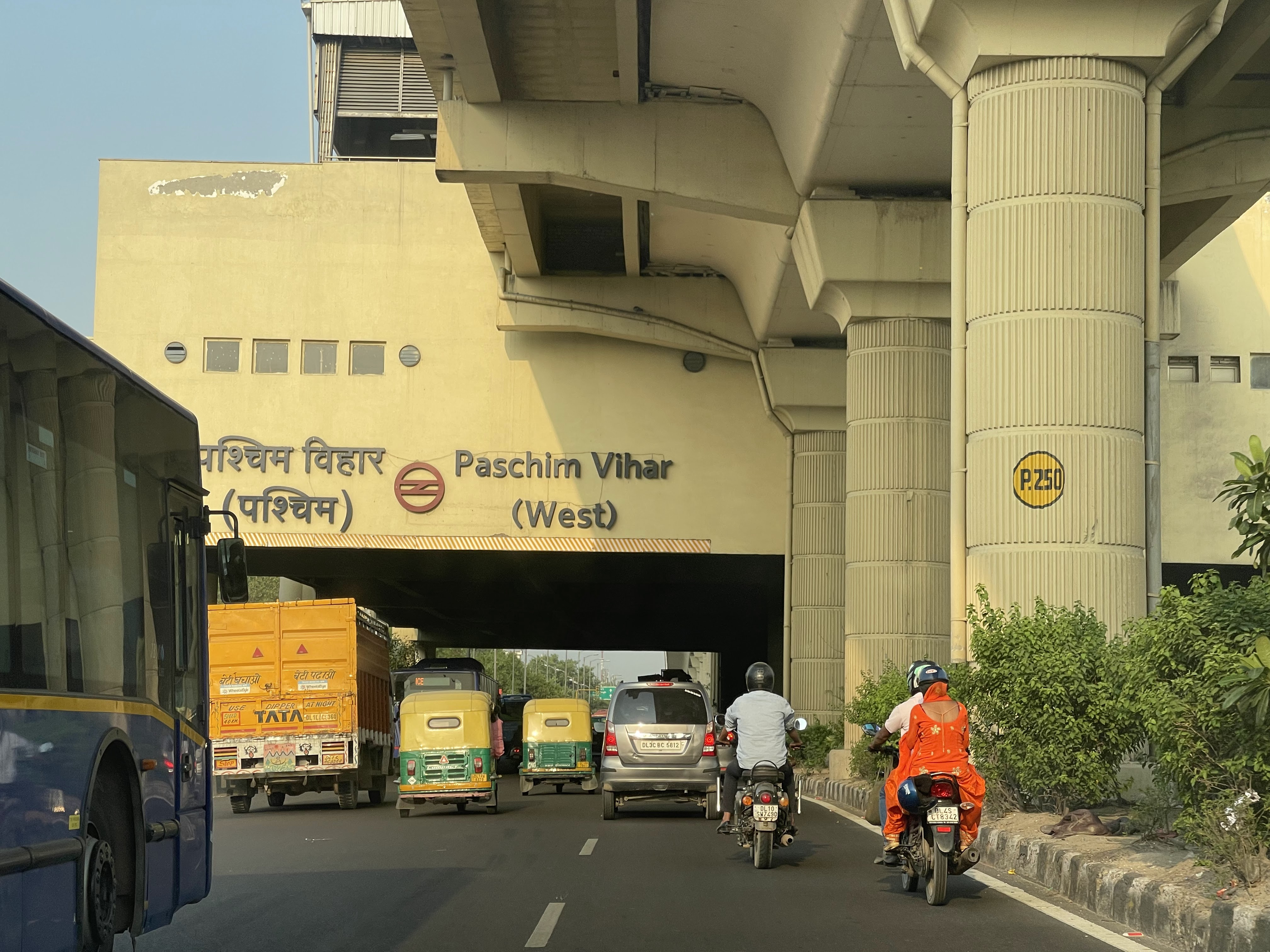

General information
- Location: Block A 1, Ashirwad, Paschim Vihar, New Delhi, 110063
- Coordinates: 28°40′43″N 77°06′08″E
- System: Delhi Metro station
- Owner: Delhi Metro
- Line: Green Line
- Platforms: Side platform; Platform-1 → Brigadier Hoshiyar Singh; Platform-2 → Inderlok / Kirti Nagar
- Tracks: 2

Construction
- Structure type: Elevated
- Platform levels: 2
- Parking: Available
- Cycle facilities: yes
- Accessible: Yes

Other information
- Station code: PVW

History
- Opened: 2 April 2010; 16 years ago
- Electrified: 25 kV 50 Hz AC through overhead catenary

Passengers
- Jan 2015: 4,048 /day 125,503/ Month average

Services
Preceding station	Delhi Metro	Following station
Peeragarhi towards Brigadier Hoshiyar Singh	Green Line	Paschim Vihar East towards Inderlok or Kirti Nagar
Route map
Location

Paschim Vihar West is a station on the Green Line of the Delhi Metro and is located in the West Delhi district of Delhi. It is an elevated station and was inaugurated on 2 April 2010. Paschim Vihar is one of the posh colonies of West Delhi. Many schools are located here like Vishal Bharti Public School, Indraprastha World School, G D Goenka Public School, Doon Public School near Jwala Heri Market and Saraswati Bal Mandir. 1 km away from the metro station is Jwala Heri Market.

== Station layout ==
L2	Side platform | Doors will open on the left
L2	Platform 2 Eastbound	Towards → Inderlok / Kirti Nagar; Next Station: Paschim Vihar East
L2	Platform 1 Westbound	Towards ← Brigadier Hoshiyar Singh; Next Station: Peeragarhi
L2	Side platform | Doors will open on the left
L1	Concourse	Fare control, station agent, Metro Card vending machines, crossover
G	Street level	Exit/Entrance

== Facilities ==
Facilities of ATMs are available at Paschim Vihar West metro station.

== See also ==
- List of Delhi Metro stations
- Transport in Delhi
- Delhi Metro Rail Corporation
- Delhi Suburban Railway
- List of rapid transit systems in India
