= Kirti Nagar railway station =

Railway station in Delhi, India

Kirti Nagar

General information
- Location: Kirti Nagar, West Delhi district India
- Coordinates: 28.6470°N 77.1455°E
- Elevation: 221 m (725 ft)
- System: Indian Railway and Delhi Suburban Railway station
- Owner: Indian Railways
- Line: Delhi Ring Railway
- Platforms: 2 BG
- Tracks: 4 BG
- Connections: Blue Line Green Line Kirti Nagar, Taxi Stand, Auto Stand

Construction
- Structure type: Standard (on ground station)
- Parking: Available
- Cycle facilities: Available
- Accessible: Disabled access

Other information
- Station code: KRTN
- Fare zone: Northern Railways

Services
Preceding station	Indian Railways	Following station
Patel Nagar towards ?	Northern Railway zone Delhi Ring Railway	Naraina Vihar towards ?
Location

Kirti Nagar railway station is a small railway station in Kirti Nagar which is a residential and commercial neighborhood of the West Delhi district of Delhi. Its code is KRTN. The station is part of Delhi Suburban Railway. The station consist of 4 platforms.

== See also ==
- Hazrat Nizamuddin railway station
- New Delhi Railway Station
- Delhi Junction Railway station
- Anand Vihar Railway Terminal
- Sarai Rohilla Railway Station
- Delhi Metro
