= Queen Mary's School Rohini =

Private girls' school in Rohini, Delhi

Coordinates: 28.7350°N 77.0946°E

Queens Convent School is a private girls' school in the sub-city of Sector 25, Rohini in Delhi, India. It was established in 2002 by Sh. Ved Mittal who is the Chairman.

== Staff ==
The principal of Queen Mary's School is Ms. Nalini Andrew.

== Houses ==
The four houses of Queen Mary's School are:

- Florence Nightingale
- Helen Keller
- Mother Teresa
- Sarojini Naidu
