= Rohini Central Jail =

Prison complex in Delhi

- Location in Delhi Location in India
- Location: Rohini, Delhi; 28.7273°N 77.1432°E
- Status: Active
- Capacity: 1050
- Population: 2000+ (March 2025)
- Opened: 2004
- Managed by: Chief Minister of Delhi
- Governor: Vinai Kumar Saxena
- Website: Tihar Prisons/Rohini

Rohini Prisons, also known as Rohini Central Jail, are a prison complex situated in Badli, North West Delhi. It is one of the three Prisons complexes in Delhi, other than Tihar and Mandoli with a capacity of 1,050 inmates and has a central prison. It is situated at banks of Bawana-Yamuna Canal, connected through the Inner Ring Road.

It was established in the year 2004 as an extension of the 10th Prison of the Tihar Prisons to overcome the carrying capacity of the Tihar. The security in the prison is managed by the Delhi Police and is under the supervision of the Rohini district branch under the range of the Northern Police Range. The complex is under the management of Ministry of Jails, Delhi Government headed by Chief Minister of Delhi.

The prison has been criticized on charges of corruption/extortion, over-crowdedness and depravation of basic needs to the prisoners. There has been proposals to extend the complex of prison further to Bawana and Mehrauli to curb the issue of over-crowdedness.
