= Dayabasti railway station =

Railway station in Dayabasti, Delhi, India

Dayabasti

General information
- Location: NH 10, Zakhira, Delhi, National Capital Territory; India
- Coordinates: 28.6674°N 77.1711°E
- Elevation: 224 m (735 ft)
- System: Indian Railway and Delhi Suburban Railway station
- Owner: Indian Railways
- Operator: Delhi railway division
- Line: Delhi Ring Railway
- Platforms: 2 BG
- Tracks: 2 BG
- Connections: Magenta Line Daya Basti (upcoming), Taxi stand, Auto stand

Construction
- Structure type: Standard (on-ground station)
- Parking: Available
- Cycle facilities: Available
- Accessible: Disabled access

Other information
- Station code: DBSI
- Fare zone: Northern Railways

Services
| Preceding station | Indian Railways | Following station |
|---|---|---|
| Delhi Sarai Rohilla towards ? | Northern Railway zone Delhi Ring Railway | Vivekanand Puri Halt towards ? |
Location
- Location within India Location within Haryana

Dayabasti railway station is a small railway station in Dayabasti which is a residential and commercial neighborhood of the North Delhi district of Delhi. Its code is DBSI. The station is part of Delhi Suburban Railway. The station consists of four platforms.

== See also ==
- Hazrat Nizamuddin railway station
- New Delhi railway station
- Delhi Junction railway station
- Anand Vihar Terminal railway station
- Sarai Rohilla railway station
- Delhi Metro
