= Khera Kalan =

Khera Kalan Badda Khera
- Village
- Nickname: Badda Khera
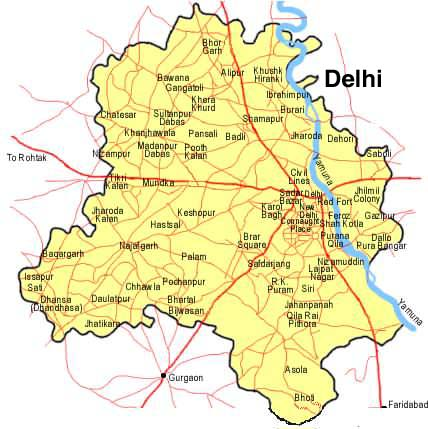
- Khera Kalan Village located in North Delhi district in Delhi

- Location in Delhi, India
- Coordinates: 28.77806°N 77.09882°E
- Country: India
- Union Territory: Delhi
- District: North Delhi
- Tehsil: Narela
- Assembly constituency: Narela

Government
  - Type: Municipal Corporation
  - Body: Municipal Corporation of Delhi

Area
  - Total: 7 km^{2} (2.7 sq mi)

Population (2011)
  - Total: 11,234
  - Density: 1,600/km^{2} (4,200/sq mi)

Languages
  - Official: Hindi, English, Haryanvi
- Time zone: UTC+5:30 (IST)
- Website: dmrceu.org

Khera Kalan is a village in Narela Sub Division in North Delhi district in the Indian union territory of Delhi. It is also known as Badda Khera. The nearest railway station is Khera Kalan railway station. Narela is the nearest town and Rohini is the nearest urbanised area. Khurd and Kalan are Persian language words which mean small and big respectively. When two villages have the same name they are distinguished by adding the word Kalan means Big and Khurd means Small with Village Name. It is in Narela assembly constituency.

== Population ==
In 2011, a report published by Census India stated that Khera Kalan had 1,539 households and a total population of 11,252. This included 6,397 males and 5,855 females. There were 1,095 children between the ages of 0 and 6 which equated to 13.27% of the village population. The distribution of the population in the 2011 census was 877 adult females for every 1,000 adult males. There were 891 female children for every 1,000 male children. This is compared to the average for the larger territory of Delhi where there are 871 females for every 1,000 males.

Khera Kalan has Delhi's largest representation of Jatrana Jats at over 60% of the population .15% Population were Paarcha Clan Balmiki community in the village.The Brahmins represent 6% of the village population while Muslims represent 5% of the population. Therefore, over 70% of the village's land belongs to members of the Jatrana Gotra. The total Scheduled Castes and Scheduled Tribes population in the town was 1,807 people and all were Scheduled Castes. There are no people belonging to Scheduled Tribes recorded in the town.

== See also ==
- Khera Kalan railway station
