= Shivaji Bridge railway station =

Railway station in New Delhi, India

Shivaji Bridge
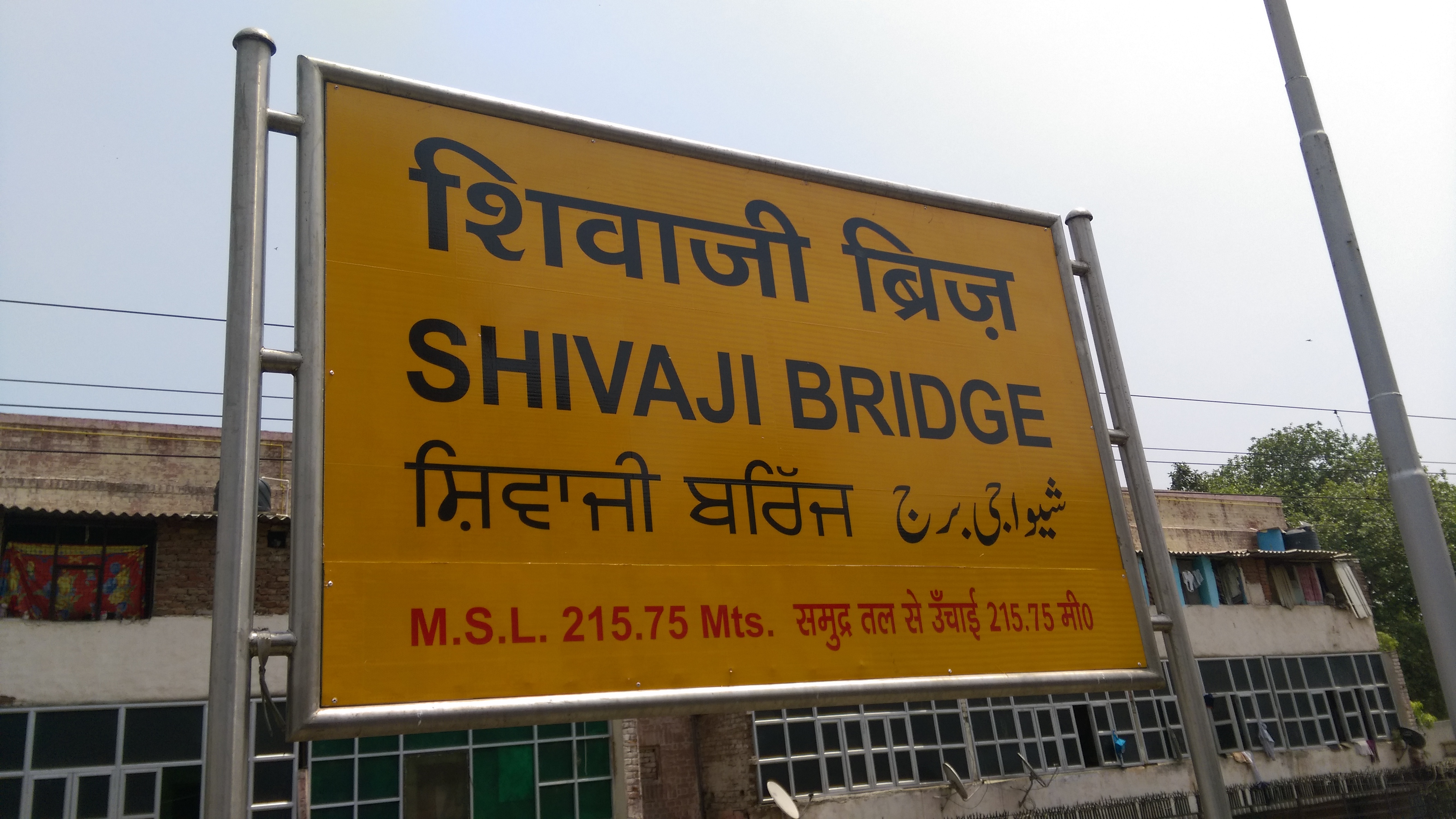

General information
- Location: Minto Road, Connaught Place, North West Delhi district India
- Coordinates: 28.6336°N 77.2262°E
- Elevation: 215.750 m (708 ft)
- System: Indian Railway and Delhi Suburban Railway station
- Owner: Indian Railways
- Line: Delhi Ring Railway
- Platforms: 2 BG
- Tracks: 4 BG
- Connections: Taxi Stand, Auto Stand

Construction
- Structure type: Standard (on ground station)
- Parking: Available
- Cycle facilities: Available
- Accessible: Disabled access

Other information
- Status: Functioning
- Station code: CSB
- Zone(s): Northern Railway
- Division(s): Delhi railway division

Services
Preceding station	Indian Railways	Following station
New Delhi towards ?	Northern Railway zone Delhi Ring Railway	Tilak Bridge towards ?
Location

A Small Suburban Railway Station in Delhi located near Connaught Place

Shivaji Bridge railway station is a small railway station part of the Delhi Suburban Railway, located in Connaught Place which is a residential and commercial neighborhood of the New Delhi district of Delhi. Its code is CSB. The station consist of four platforms.

Officially named after the bridge that follows it on the Track, the Shivaji Bridge (Popularly only referred to by its older name Minto Bridge).

== Trains ==
- Agra Cantt. – Old Delhi Passenger (UnReserved)
- Sirsa Express
- Hazrat Nizamuddin – Rohtak Passenger (UnReserved)
- Saharanpur Delhi Passenger (UnReserved)
- Rewari Meerut Cantt. Passenger (UnReserved)
- Panipat Ghaziabad MEMU
- Tilak Bridge – Rewari Passenger (UnReserved)
- Rewari – Nizamuddin Passenger (UnReserved)
- Ghaziabad Panipat MEMU
- Kurukshetra Hazrat Nizamuddin MEMU
- Meerut Cantt. – Rewari Passenger (UnReserved)
- New Delhi – Bareilly Intercity Express
- Bulandshahr – Tilak Bridge Passenger (UnReserved)

== See also ==
- Adarsh Nagar metro station
- Hazrat Nizamuddin railway station
- New Delhi Railway Station
- Delhi Junction Railway station
- Anand Vihar Railway Terminal
- Sarai Rohilla Railway Station
- Delhi Metro
