= Patel Nagar railway station =

Delhi ring railway network station

Patel Nagar

General information
- Location: Patel Nagar, West Delhi district India
- Coordinates: 28.6603°N 77.1568°E
- Elevation: 222 m (728 ft)
- System: Indian Railway and Delhi Suburban Railway station
- Owner: Indian Railways
- Lines: Delhi Ring Railway; Delhi–Fazilka line Delhi–Jaipur line
- Platforms: 6 BG
- Tracks: 12 BG
- Connections: Green Line Satguru Ram Singh Marg

Construction
- Structure type: Standard (on-ground station)
- Parking: Available
- Cycle facilities: Available
- Accessible: Disabled access

Other information
- Station code: PTNR
- Fare zone: Northern Railways

Services
Preceding station	Indian Railways	Following station
Delhi Cantonment towards ?	Northern Railway zone Delhi Ring Railway	Kirti Nagar towards ?
Location

Patel Nagar railway station is a railway station in Patel Nagar which is a residential and commercial neighborhood of West Delhi area of Delhi. Its code is PTNR. The station is part of Delhi Suburban Railway. The station consists of 7 platforms. Trains like Ajmer Hazrat Nizamuddin Jan Shatabdi Express and Saharanpur Farukhnagar Janta Express are among the fast trains that stop here.

== See also ==
- Hazrat Nizamuddin railway station
- New Delhi railway station
- Delhi Junction railway station
- Anand Vihar Terminal railway station
- Delhi Sarai Rohilla railway station
- Delhi Metro

Delhi travel guide from Wikivoyage
