= Tecnia Institute of Advanced Studies =

Coordinates: 28.7061093°N 77.1276947°E

- Type: Private
- Established: 1998
- Affiliations: Guru Gobind Singh Indraprastha University, NAAC
- Chairman: Ram Kailash Gupta
- Director: Dr. Ajay Kumar
- Location: Madhuban Chowk, Sector 14, Rohini, Delhi, India
- Campus: Madhuban Chowk, (Rohini Sector 14)
- Nickname: TIAS
- Website: www.tiaspg.tecnia.in

Tecnia Institute of Advanced Studies (TIAS) is a college affiliated with Guru Gobind Singh Indraprastha University and located in Madhuban Chowk, Sector 14, Rohini, Delhi. TIAS is recognised under section 2(f) by UGC. Admission to TIAS is through the Common Entrance Test (CET) conducted by Guru Gobind Singh Indraprastha University. Tecnia Institute of Advanced Studies (TIAS) – is ISO 9001:2015 & ISO 14001:2015 certified institute for its Quality Management System (QMS) and Environmental Management System (EMS) by ISC Assurance Services Pvt. Ltd for recognition for its well established system

== History ==
TIAS was established in 1998 by Health and Education

== Recognition and accreditation ==
TIAS has been accredited by the National Assessment and Accreditation Council (NAAC) with an "A" grade. The institute offers MBA, MCA, BBA and BJMC degree programmes.

== Courses ==
Course Name	Intake	Placement CTC
Bachelor of Business Administration (BBA)	120(Morning Shift) + 120 (Evening shift)	5–12.5 LPA
Bachelor of Computer Applications (BCA)	60	3-4 LPA
Bachelor of Journalism and Mass Communication (BJMC)	180(M) + 180(E)	2-3 LPA
Master of Business Administration (MBA)	240 + 60(E)	4-6 LPA
Master of Computer Applications (MCA)	30	4-6 LPA

== Admissions ==
Admissions in TIAS are provided through a Common Entrance Test (CET) exam conducted by GGSIPU. Admissions are also provided through management quota for with 10% of the seats are reserved by the college. Charges for seat might defer from course to course but might cost approx 4-10 lacs per seat.

== Programmes ==
The college offers the following courses:

- MBA
- BBA
- B.Com. (Hons)
- MCA
- BCA
- BAJMC
- MAMC
- M.Clin.Psy
