= Tilak Bridge railway station =

Railway station in New Delhi, India

Tilak Bridge
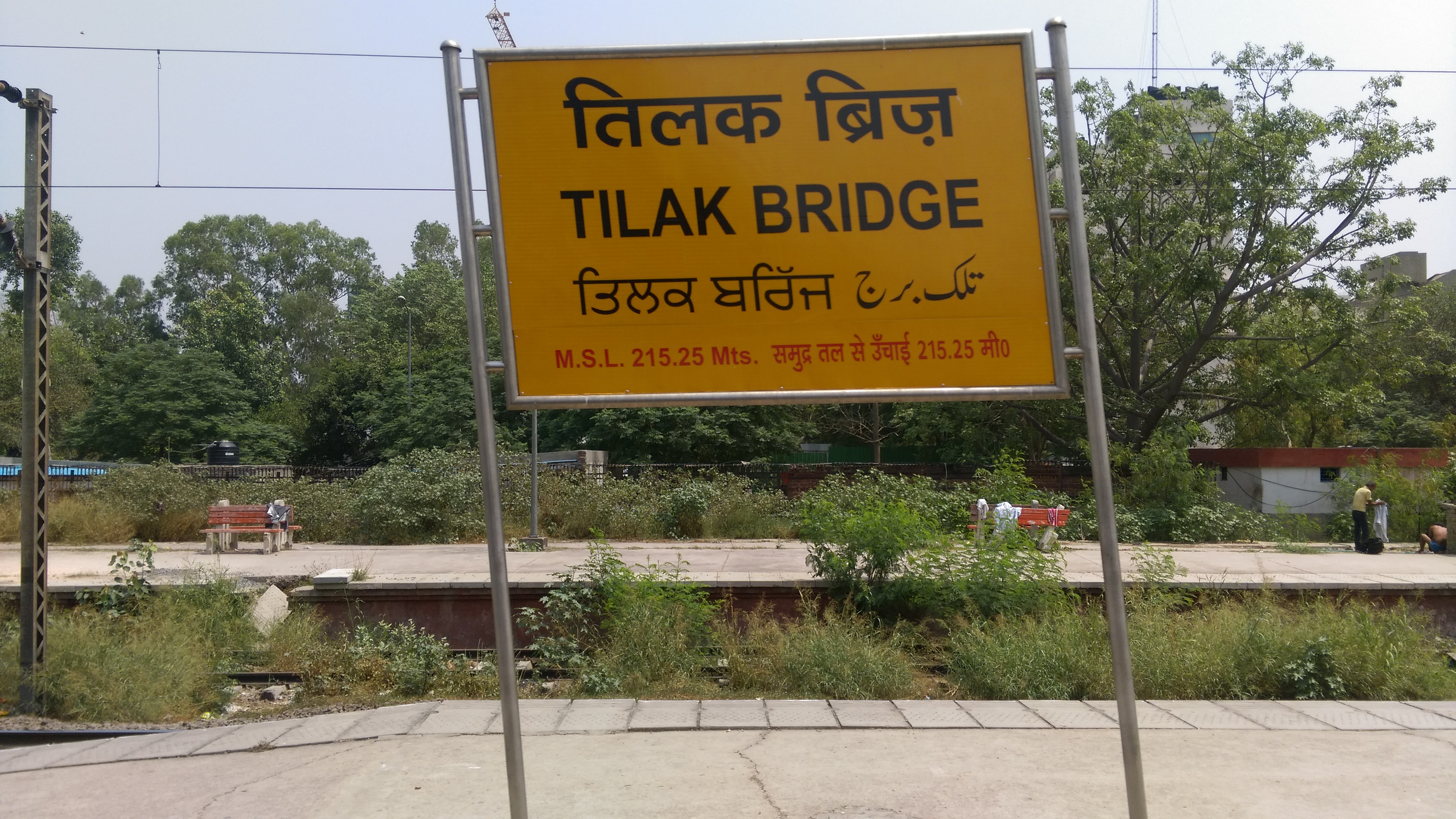

General information
- Location: Mahawat Khan Road, Bengali Market, New Delhi; India
- Coordinates: 28.6283°N 77.2375°E
- Elevation: 215.250 m (706 ft)
- System: Indian Railway and Delhi Suburban Railway station
- Owner: Indian Railways
- Operator: Northern Railway
- Line: Delhi Ring Railway
- Platforms: 2 BG
- Tracks: 4 BG
- Connections: Taxi Stand, Auto Stand

Construction
- Structure type: Standard (on ground station)
- Parking: Available
- Cycle facilities: Available
- Accessible: Disabled access

Other information
- Status: Functioning
- Station code: TKJ
- Zone(s): Northern Railways
- Division(s): Delhi railway division

Services
Preceding station	Indian Railways	Following station
Shivaji Bridge towards ?	Northern Railway zone Delhi Ring Railway	Pragati Maidan towards ?
Location

Tilak Bridge railway station is a railway station in New Delhi. Its code is TKJ. The station is part of the Delhi Suburban Railway. The station consists of four platforms. Construction of additional 5th and 6th new railway line is happening between Tilak Bridge and New Delhi to enhance capacity of already saturated tracks. With this, three additional platforms have been constructed (new platform 6 and 7 would be an island platform ) at Tilak Bridge. This will take the total number of platforms to seven.

Tilak Bridge Station was constructed in 1924, after existing railway lines were re-aligned as a result of the construction of the new imperial capital. Originally named Hardinge Bridge after Hardinge Avenue, the main road to its south, the station acquired its present name in the 1960s after Hardinge Avenue was renamed Tilak Marg.

The Tilak Bridge Railway Station in New Delhi is slated for a significant upgrade as part of the Amrit Bharat Station Scheme. This initiative, which is part of a broader plan to modernize 554 railway stations across India, is expected to cost approximately Rs 26.1 crore. The redevelopment project aims to enhance the station's infrastructure, including the façade, waiting room, and parking facilities, as well as introduce new amenities for passengers.

== Trains ==
Some of the trains that run from Tilak Bridge are :

- Udyan Abha Toofan Express -discontinued
- Saharanpur - Delhi Passenger
- Rewari - Meerut Cantt. Passenger
- Panipat - Ghaziabad MEMU
- Old Delhi - Agra Cantt. Passenger
- New Delhi - Bareilly Intercity Express
- Kurukshetra - Hazrat Nizamuddin MEMU
- Hazrat Nizamuddin - Kurukshetra MEMU
- Hazrat Nizamuddin - Rohtak Passenger
- Hazrat Nizamuddin - Bulandshahr Passenger
- Dehradun - New Delhi Jan Shatabdi Express
- Tilak Bridge - Rewari Passenger
- Sirsa Express

== Connectivity ==
The nearest metro station is Mandi House on Blue Line, which is about 1 km from the railway station and the nearest bus stop is Tilak Bridge.

== See also ==
- Adarsh Nagar metro station
- Hazrat Nizamuddin railway station
- New Delhi Railway Station
- Delhi Junction Railway station
- Anand Vihar Railway Terminal
- Sarai Rohilla Railway Station
- Delhi Metro
