= Barwala, Delhi =

Barwala
- Village
- Location in India
- Coordinates: 28.762°N 77.063°E
- Country: India
- Union Territory: Delhi
- District: North West

Population (2011)
  - Total: 8,948

Languages
  - Official: Hindi
- Time zone: UTC+5:30 (IST)

Barwala is a village is located, near Sector 35, Rohini in North West district in the Indian territory of Delhi. According to 2011 census Barwala Village has population of 8,948 of which 4,783 are males while 4,165 are females as per report released by Census India 2011.

The population of children aged 0-6 is 1199 which is 13.40% of total population of Barwala (CT). In Barwala Village, the female sex ratio is 871 against state average of 868. Moreover, the child sex ratio in Barwala is around 771 compared to Delhi state average of 871. The literacy rate of Barwala city is 85.38% lower than state average of 86.21%. In Barwala, male literacy is around 92.50% while the female literacy rate is 77.35%.

Barwala has total administration over 1,748 houses to which it supplies basic amenities like water and sewerage. It is also authorize to build roads within Census Town limits and impose taxes on properties coming under its jurisdiction. India's first dedicated heliport named Rohini Heliport built at a cost of Rs 100 crore for flying in and out of Delhi to nearby areas in choppers is also located in Barwala.
