= Haiderpur Badli Mor metro station =

Metro station in Delhi, India

Haiderpur Badli Mor

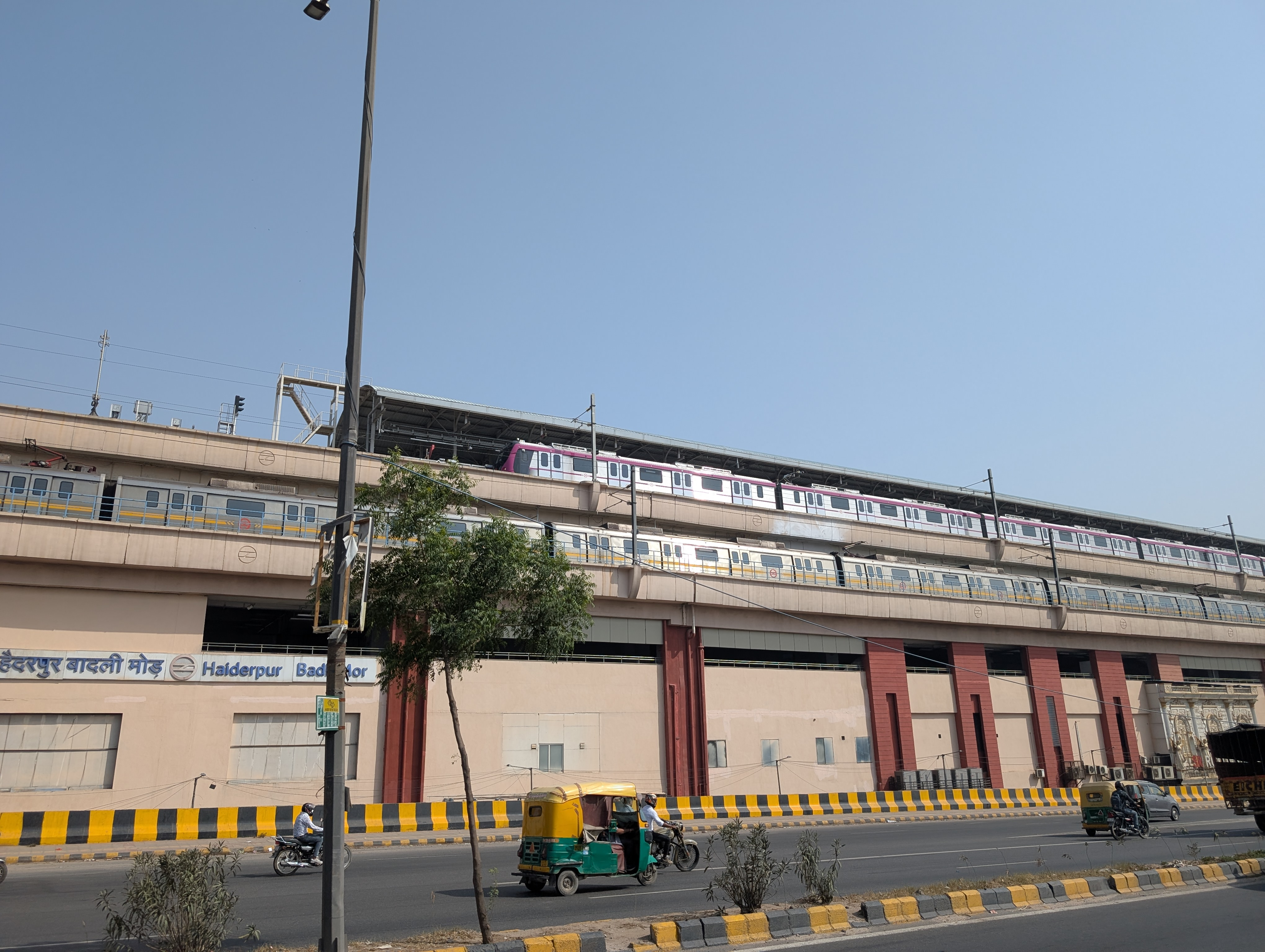

General information
- Location: Badli Mor, Outer Ring Road, Haiderpur, C and D Block, Shalimar Bagh, Delhi 110088; India
- Coordinates: 28°43′48″N 77°08′57″E
- System: Delhi Metro station
- Owner: Delhi Metro
- Operator: Delhi Metro Rail Corporation (DMRC)
- Line: Yellow Line Magenta Line
- Platforms: Island platform; Platform 1 → Samaypur Badli; Platform 2 → Millennium City Centre Gurugram; Platform 3 → Deepali Chowk; Platform 4 → Majlis Park
- Tracks: 4

Construction
- Structure type: Elevated, double-track
- Platform levels: 2
- Parking: Available
- Accessible: Yes

Other information
- Status: Staffed, Operational
- Station code: BIMR

History
- Opened: 10 November 2015; 11 years ago Yellow Line; 8 March 2026; 8 months ago Magenta Line
- Electrified: 25 kV 50 Hz AC through overhead catenary

Passengers
- 10,000

Services
Preceding station	Delhi Metro	Following station
Rohini Sector 18, 19 towards Samaypur Badli	Yellow Line	Jahangirpuri towards Millennium City Centre Gurugram
Bhalaswa towards Majlis Park	Magenta Line	Haiderpur Village towards Deepali Chowk
Route map
Location

Haiderpur Badli Mor is an interchange metro station on the Yellow and Magenta lines of the Delhi Metro. It is an elevated, two-level station located in Haiderpur, Shalimar Bagh, Delhi. The station was inaugurated on 10 November 2015 as part of the Jahangirpuri–Samaypur Badli extension of the Yellow Line under Phase III. The Magenta Line section was opened to the public on 8 March 2026 as part of the Deepali Chowk–Majlis Park corridor under Phase IV.

== Station layout ==
P2	Platform 3 Southbound	Towards → Deepali Chowk; Next Station: Haiderpur Village
P2	Island platform | Doors will open on the right
P2	Platform 4 Northbound	Towards ← Majlis Park; Next Station: Bhalaswa
P1	Platform 1 Southbound	Towards → Millennium City Centre Gurugram; Next Station: Jahangirpuri
P1	Island platform | Doors will open on the right
P1	Platform 2 Northbound	Towards ← Samaypur Badli; Next Station: Rohini Sector 18, 19
C	Concourse	Fare control, station agent, Ticket/token, shops
G	Street Level	Exit/Entrance

== See also ==
- List of Delhi Metro stations
- Transport in Delhi
- Delhi Metro Rail Corporation
- Delhi Suburban Railway
- Delhi Transport Corporation
- North Delhi
- National Capital Region (India)
- List of rapid transit systems
- List of metro systems
