= Supreme Court metro station =

Metro station in Delhi, India

Supreme Court

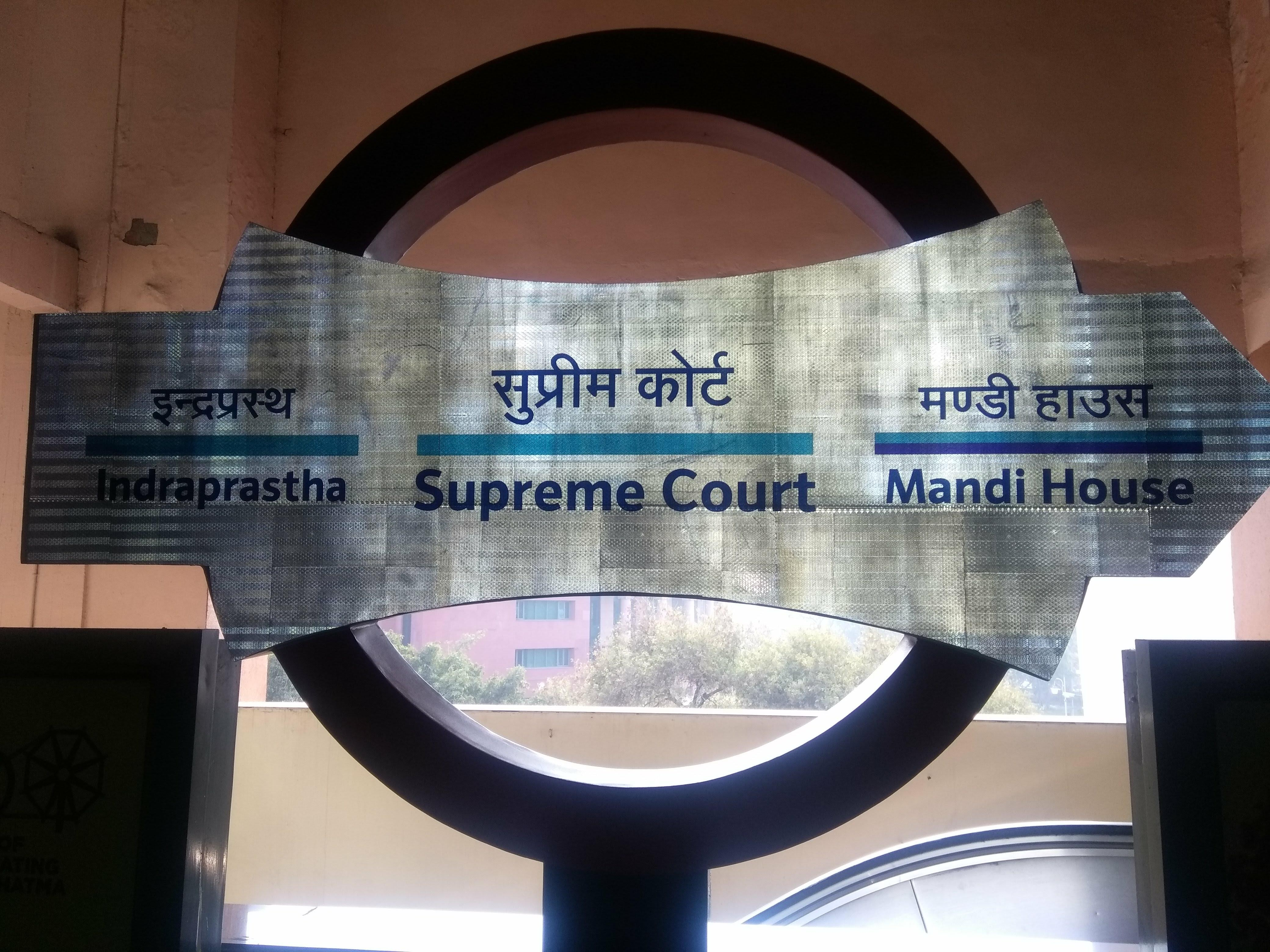

General information
- Coordinates: 28°37′25″N 77°14′33″E
- System: Delhi Metro station
- Owner: Delhi Metro
- Line: Blue Line
- Platforms: Side platform; Platform-1 → Noida Electronic City / Vaishali; Platform-2 → Dwarka Sector 21
- Tracks: 2

Construction
- Structure type: Elevated
- Parking: Available
- Accessible: Yes

Other information
- Station code: PTMD

History
- Opened: 11 November 2006; 20 years ago
- Electrified: 25 kV 50 Hz AC through overhead catenary

Services
Preceding station	Delhi Metro	Following station
Mandi House towards Dwarka Sector 21	Blue Line	Indraprastha towards Noida Electronic City or Vaishali
Route map
Location

The Supreme Court metro station, formerly known as Pragati Maidan metro station, is an elevated station on the Blue Line of the Delhi Metro. It provides access to the Supreme Court of India, Bharat Mandapam (formerly Pragati Maidan) and the nearby ITO office area.

== Station layout ==
L2	Side platform | Doors will open on the left
L2	Platform 1 Eastbound	Towards → Noida Electronic City / Vaishali; Next Station: Indraprastha
L2	Platform 2 Westbound	Towards ← Dwarka Sector 21; Next Station: Mandi House Change at the next station for Violet Line
L2	Side platform | Doors will open on the left
L1	Concourse	Fare control, station agent, Metro Card vending machines, crossover
G	Street level	Exit/Entrance

== See also ==
- List of Delhi Metro stations
- Transport in Delhi
- Pragati Maidan railway station
