= Pragati Maidan railway station =

Delhi ring railway network station

Pragati Maidan
- Pragati Maidan railway station in 2020

General information
- Location: Mahatma Gandhi Road, IP Estate, New Delhi district India
- Coordinates: 28.6155°N 77.2474°E
- Elevation: 209 m (686 ft)
- System: Indian Railway and Delhi Suburban Railway station
- Owner: Indian Railways
- Operator: Northern Railway
- Line: Delhi Ring Railway
- Platforms: 2 BG
- Tracks: 4 BG
- Connections: Taxi stand, Auto stand

Construction
- Structure type: Standard (on-ground station)
- Parking: Available
- Cycle facilities: Available
- Accessible: Disabled access

Other information
- Status: Functioning
- Station code: PGMD
- Zone(s): North Central Railway
- Division(s): Allahabad

Services
Preceding station	Indian Railways	Following station
Tilak Bridge towards ?	Northern Railway zone Delhi Ring Railway	Hazrat Nizamuddin towards ?
Location

Pragati Maidan railway station is a small railway station in Pragati Maidan which is a residential and commercial neighborhood of the New Delhi district of Delhi. Its code is PGMD. The station is part of Delhi Suburban Railway. The station consists of 2 platforms.

== Major trains ==
- New Delhi–Kurukshetra MEMU

== See also ==
- Supreme Court metro station
- Hazrat Nizamuddin railway station
- New Delhi railway station
- Delhi Junction railway station
- Anand Vihar Railway Terminal
- Sarai Rohilla railway station
- Delhi Metro
