= Rohini, Delhi =

Neighborhood in West Delhi, India

Rohini Delhi
- Sub City & Neighbourhood
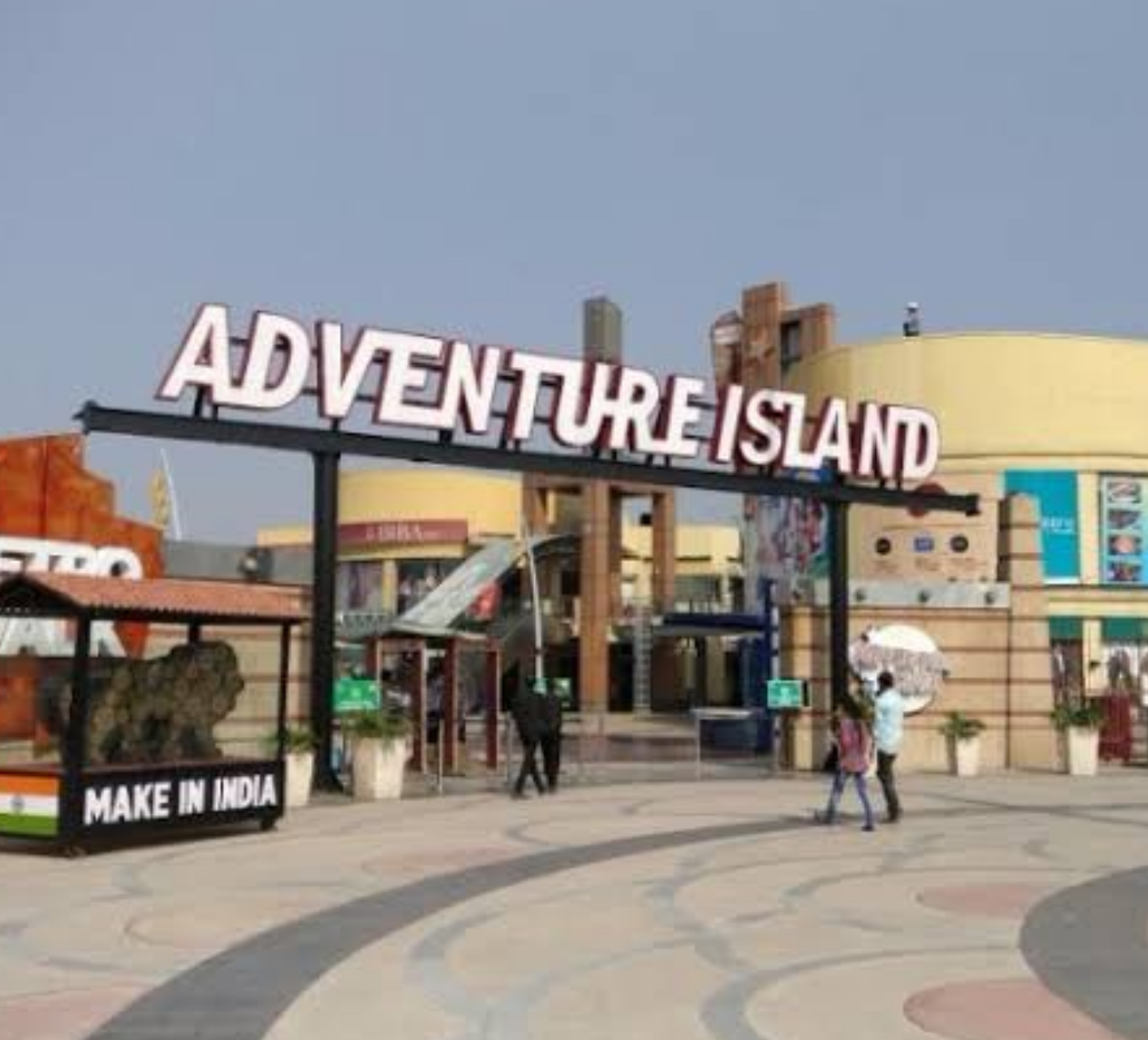
- Adventure Island in Sector 10, Rohini, Delhi
- Interactive map of Rohini Delhi
- Coordinates: 28.7383°N 77.0822°E
- Country: India
- Union Territory: Delhi
- District: North West Delhi

Government
  - Type: Municipal Corporation
  - Body: Municipal Corporation of Delhi
  - MLA of Rohini Assembly constituency: Vijender Gupta

Area
  - Total: 60.880 km^{2} (23.506 sq mi)
- Elevation: 216.2 m (709 ft)

Languages
  - Official: Hindi, English
- Time zone: UTC+5:30 (IST)
- Lok Sabha constituency: North West Delhi
- Civic agency: MCD

Rohini is a sub city and a neighbourhood in the North West Delhi district of the Union Territory of Delhi, India. It was developed as part of sub-city project of Delhi Development Authority (DDA), which was started in the 1980s to provide a composite society for all income groups. Rohini is one of the 12 zones administered under the Municipal Corporation of Delhi.

== Geography ==
The neighbouring areas are Pitampura, Shalimar Bagh, Haider Pur, Mangol Puri, Sultanpuri, Khera Kalan, Khera Khurd, Budh Vihar, Karala, Kanjhawala, Samaypur, Barwala, Pooth Khurd, Kirari Suleman Nagar, Pooth Kalan, Mukarba Chowk and Bawana.

== Politics ==
Vijender Gupta is the Member of Legislative Assembly for the Rohini Assembly constituency. The MP of Rohini (North-West Delhi) is Yogendra Chandoliya. The location has composite demographics with its inhabitants following different faiths and religions and speaking an array of languages including Hindi, Punjabi and English.

== Transport ==
Rohini Heliport owned by Pawan Hans, was inaugurated by Union Civil Aviation Minister Ashok Gajapathi Raju on 28 February, 2017. The heliport, spread over 25 acres and situated a few kilometres away from the Rithala metro station, is the first of its kind in the country.

It has three stations on the Red Line of Delhi Metro: Rohini East, Rohini West and Rithala metro station. Rohini also has two station on the Yellow Line, the Rohini sector 18,19 metro station, Samaypur Badli metro station making it one of Delhi Metro's major hubs.

== Population and area ==
Rohini has a population of approximately 860,000 inhabitants and covers an area of 3,015 hectares. The sub-city is under active development, and is expected to expand to 7,548 hectares and 1.1 million people by the completion of the development project. The literacy rate of Rohini 84.45% which quite near to Delhi's average literacy rate i.e. 86.9%.

== Education ==
Rohini has various colleges and schools including:-

- Delhi Technological University (DTU)
- National Forensic Sciences University, Sector 3
- Queen Mary's School Rohini, Sector 25
- Shaheed Sukhdev College of Business Studies (DU), Sector 16
- Tecnia Institute of Advanced Studies, Sector 14

== Prison ==
Rohini has one of 3 prison complexes within Delhi known as Rohini Central Jail, other being Tihar Prisons and Mandoli.
