= Badli railway station =

Railway station in Delhi, India

Badli

General information
- Location: Samaypur Badli, Sector 18, Rohini, North West Delhi district, National Capital Territory of Delhi, 110042; India
- Coordinates: 28.7465°N 77.1375°E
- Elevation: 218 metres (715 ft)
- System: Indian Railway and Delhi Suburban Railway station
- Owner: Indian Railways
- Operator: Delhi railway division
- Line: Delhi Ring Railway
- Platforms: 2
- Tracks: 4
- Connections: Yellow Line Samaypur Badli

Construction
- Structure type: Standard (on-ground station)
- Parking: Yes
- Cycle facilities: No
- Accessible: Disabled access

Other information
- Status: Functioning
- Station code: BHD
- Fare zone: Northern Railway
Location
- Location within India Location within Delhi

Badli railway station is a small railway station in Samaypur Badli, Sector 18, Rohini in North West Delhi district, NCT of Delhi. Its code is BHD. It serves Badli and Sectors of Rohini which is a residential and commercial neighborhood. The station consists of two platforms. The platforms are well sheltered.

== Trains ==
- New Delhi–Kurukshetra MEMU
- Lokmanya Tilak Terminus–Amritsar Express
- Delhi–Panipat Passenger
- Panipat–New Delhi MEMU
- Panipat–Ghaziabad MEMU
- Kurukshetra–Hazrat Nizamuddin MEMU
- New Delhi–Kurukshetra MEMU
- Delhi–Kalka Passenger
- Kurukshetra–Old Delhi MEMU
- Himachal Express

== See also ==
Delhi travel guide from Wikivoyage

- Hazrat Nizamuddin railway station
- New Delhi railway station
- Delhi Junction railway station
- Anand Vihar Railway Terminal
- Sarai Rohilla railway station
- Delhi Metro
