= Adarsh Nagar metro station =

Metro station in Delhi, India

Adarsh Nagar

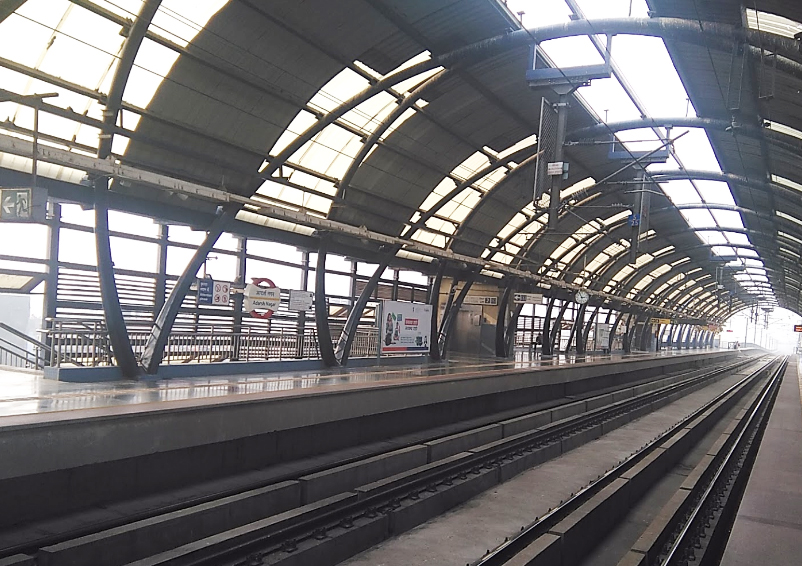

General information
- Location: Metro Station, GT Road, Azadpur, opposite Adarsh Nagar, Adarsh Nagar, New Delhi, Delhi 110033; India
- Coordinates: 28°43′00″N 77°10′14″E
- System: Delhi Metro station
- Owner: Delhi Metro
- Line: Yellow Line
- Platforms: Side platform; Platform-1 → Millennium City Centre Gurugram; Platform-2 → Samaypur Badli
- Tracks: 2
- Connections: Adarsh Nagar

Construction
- Structure type: Elevated
- Platform levels: 2
- Accessible: Yes

Other information
- Station code: AHNR

History
- Opened: 4 February 2009; 17 years ago
- Electrified: 25 kV 50 Hz AC through overhead catenary

Passengers
- Jan 2015: 361,182; 11,651Daily Average

Services
Preceding station	Delhi Metro	Following station
Jahangirpuri towards Samaypur Badli	Yellow Line	Azadpur towards Millennium City Centre Gurugram
Route map
Location

The Adarsh Nagar metro station is located on the Yellow Line of the Delhi Metro. The metro station is a short walk (500-550 metre) from the Adarsh Nagar railway station.

== Station layout ==
L2	Side platform | Doors will open on the left
L2	Platform 1 Southbound	Towards → Millennium City Centre Gurugram; Next Station: Azadpur Change at the next station for Pink Line
L2	Platform 2 Northbound	Towards ← Samaypur Badli; Next Station: Jahangirpuri
L2	Side platform | Doors will open on the left
L1	Concourse	Fare control, station agent, Metro Card vending machines, crossover
G	Street Level	Exit/Entrance

== Connections ==
Delhi Transport Corporation bus routes number 17, 19, 19A, 19B, 100, 100A, 100EXT, 101A, 101B, 101EXT, 103, 103EXT, 103STL, 106, 106A, 107, 109, 112, 113, 113EXT, 116, 119, 120, 120A, 120B, 123, 124, 125, 128, 129, 130, 131, 134, 135, 136, 137, 138, 140, 142, 142A, 144, 146, 147, 148, 149, 154, 159, 169, 169SPL, 171, 172, 173, 175, 177, 179, 181, 181A, 191, 193, 194, 195, 199, 259, 333, 341, 804, 804A, 861, 883, 982, 982LSTL, GMS(+)(-) serve the station.

== See also ==
- List of Delhi Metro stations
- Transport in Delhi
- Delhi Metro Rail Corporation
- Delhi Suburban Railway
- Delhi Transport Corporation
- North Delhi
- National Capital Region (India)
- List of rapid transit systems
- List of metro systems
