= Lajpat Nagar railway station =

Delhi ring railway network station

Lajpat Nagar

General information
- Location: Lajpat Nagar, South Delhi district India
- Coordinates: 28.5747908°N 77.2270834°E
- Elevation: 503 m (1,650 ft)
- System: Indian Railway and Delhi Suburban Railway station
- Owner: Indian Railways
- Line: Delhi Ring Railway
- Platforms: 4 BG
- Tracks: 4 BG
- Connections: Taxi stand, auto stand

Construction
- Structure type: Standard (on ground station)
- Parking: Available
- Cycle facilities: Available
- Accessible: Disabled access

Other information
- Station code: LPNR
- Fare zone: Northern Railways

Services
Preceding station	Indian Railways	Following station
Sewa Nagar towards ?	Northern Railway zone Delhi Ring Railway	Hazrat Nizamuddin towards ?
Location
- Location within India Location within Haryana

Lajpat Nagar railway station is a small railway station in Lajpat Nagar which is a residential and commercial neighborhood of the South Delhi district of Delhi. Its code is LPNR. The station is part of Delhi Suburban Railway. The station consist of four platforms.

== See also ==
Delhi travel guide from Wikivoyage

- Hazrat Nizamuddin railway station
- New Delhi Railway Station
- Delhi Junction Railway station
- Anand Vihar Railway Terminal
- Sarai Rohilla Railway Station
- Delhi Metro
