= Ronald Vivian Smith =

Indian news reporter

Ronald Vivian Smith (1938 - 30 April 2020) was an Indian news reporter and author of several books on Delhi, including Lingering Charm of Delhi: Myth, Lore and History and Delhi: Unknown tales of a city.
