= Delhi Suburban Railway =

Suburban railway service in India's National Capital Region

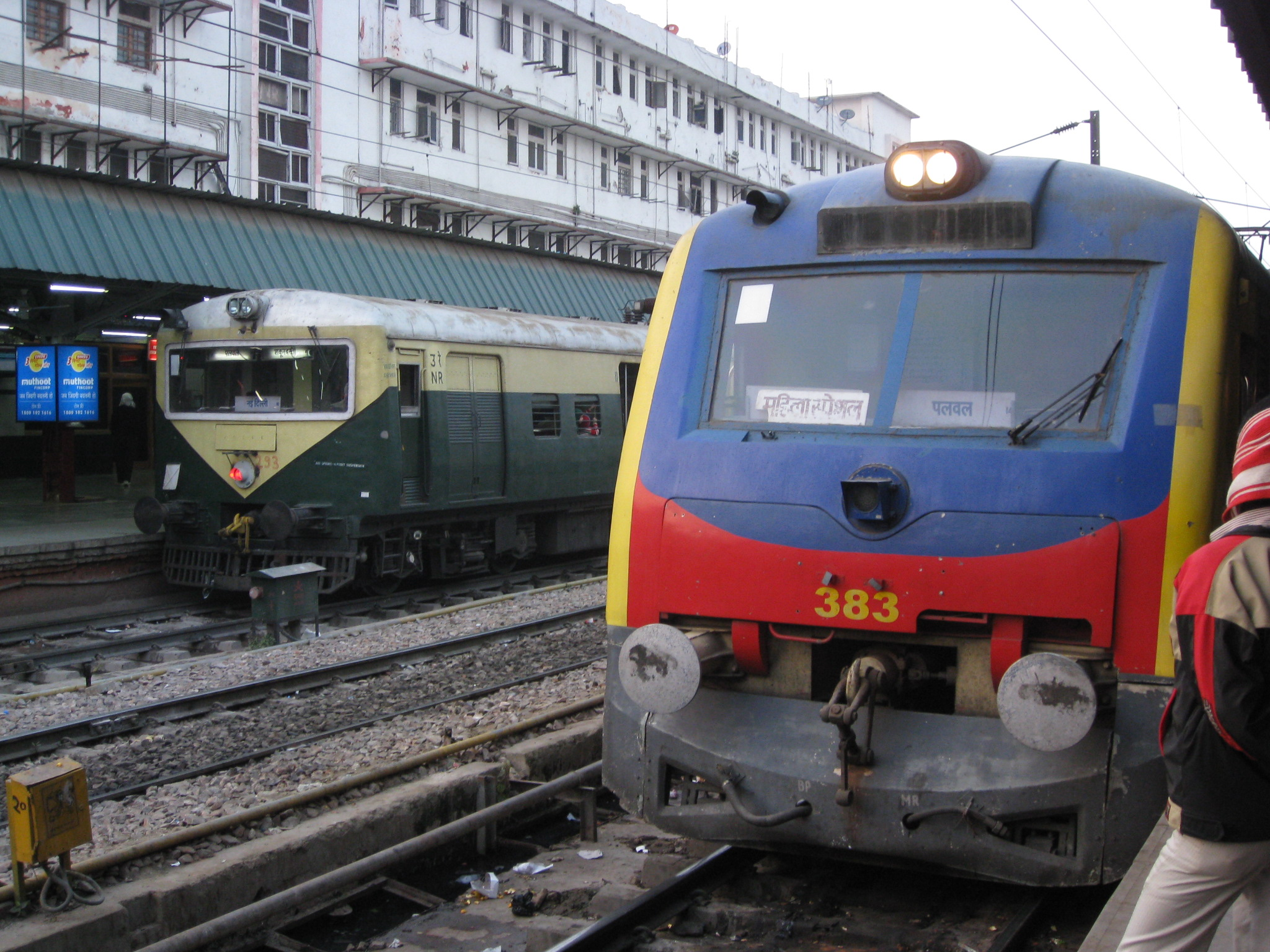

Overview
- Owner: Indian Railways
- Locale: National Capital Region, India
- Transit type: Suburban Rail
- Number of stations: 46

Operation
- Operator: Northern Railway

Technical
- Track gauge: 5 ft 6 in (1,676 mm) Indian gauge
System map

Delhi Suburban Railway is a suburban train service operated by Northern Railway in the National Capital Region (NCR). In February 2018, the Ministry of Railways announced plans to revive Delhi's Ring Railway system and integrate it with the Delhi Metro through interchange facilities. A feasibility study was commissioned to examine the proposed integration.

== History ==
On 2 January 1955, Delhi's first local train service was inaugurated between New Delhi and Vinay Nagar (now known as Sarojini Nagar). The suburban rail network subsequently expanded to serve various cities and towns across the National Capital Region (NCR), including Sonipat, Panipat, Rohtak, Rewari, Bhiwani, Faridabad, Palwal, Gurugram, Ghaziabad, Meerut and Aligarh.

In August 2009, the first Ladies Special train in the National Capital Region was introduced between New Delhi and Palwal. The Railway Minister subsequently announced plans to introduce similar services on routes connecting Delhi with Ghaziabad and Panipat.

== Services ==
=== Tracks ===
Delhi Suburban Railway services operate on tracks shared with long-distance and other passenger train.

=== Rolling stock ===
Delhi Suburban Railway services are primarily operated using Electric Multiple Unit (EMU) and Mainline Electric Multiple Unit (MEMU) rakes. Delhi's EMU services commonly operate with 12-coach formations, comprising general compartments and compartments reserved for women. The network serves 46 railway stations within Delhi, as well as stations in neighbouring parts of Haryana and Uttar Pradesh.

=== Network ===
The Delhi Suburban Railway network consists of the Delhi Ring Railway and radial railway corridors connecting the national capital with towns and cities across the National Capital Region (NCR).

- Ring services
  - Delhi Ring Railway: A 34–35 km railway loop within Delhi, running parallel to the city's Ring Road. The route connects several railway stations in the city and has historically operated services in both clockwise and anti-clockwise directions.
- Radial services in the NCR
  - The radial railway corridors connect Delhi with surrounding towns and cities in Haryana and Uttar Pradesh.
- Haryana
  - New Delhi–Sonipat–Panipat to the north.
  - Delhi–Bahadurgarh–Rohtak to the west.
  - Delhi–Gurugram–Rewari, with connections towards Bhiwani and Hisar.
  - New Delhi–Faridabad–Palwal to the south, with onward services towards Mathura.
- Uttar Pradesh
  - Delhi–Shamli–Saharanpur to the north.
  - Delhi–Ghaziabad to the east.
  - Delhi–Ghaziabad–Meerut to the northeast.
  - Delhi–Ghaziabad–Khurja–Aligarh to the southeast.

=== Timings and fares ===
Fares on Delhi's suburban rail services are generally lower than those of the Delhi Metro for comparable journeys. However, train timetables and frequencies vary by route, and services may be delayed by the movement of long-distance trains, which are given operational priority. Commuter services operate primarily during morning and evening peak periods, with varying frequencies across different routes.

== Issues ==
Despite its potential, the Delhi Suburban Railway, particularly the Ring Railway, has remained underutilised due to factors such as inadequate last-mile connectivity, poor access to stations, safety concerns and competition from the Delhi Metro. The suburban services also share railway infrastructure with freight and long-distance trains, limiting the capacity available for commuter operations. In 2017, the Ministry of Railways examined proposals for reviving the Ring Railway, while a feasibility study commissioned in 2018 explored its integration with the Delhi Metro through new linkages and interchange facilities. Earlier proposals for an Integrated Rail-cum-Bus Transit (IRBT) system had also been considered as part of the regional rapid transit plans for connecting Delhi with major towns in the National Capital Region.

A 2015 research study evaluating Delhi's suburban rail system recorded an overall Customer Satisfaction Index (CSI) of 0.45, indicating below-satisfactory service quality. In the Delhi Economic Survey 2003–04, plans were outlined for three dedicated commuter railway corridors with a combined length of 62.38 km, although these corridors were not implemented as originally proposed. A 2025 report by Down To Earth, citing a researcher from the CSIR-Central Road Research Institute, estimated that suburban rail accounts for between 0.5% and 3% of commuter traffic in Delhi. The report also highlighted the system's low ridership, delays and infrastructure constraints, despite its relatively low fares and extensive reach across the National Capital Region.

== Gallery ==
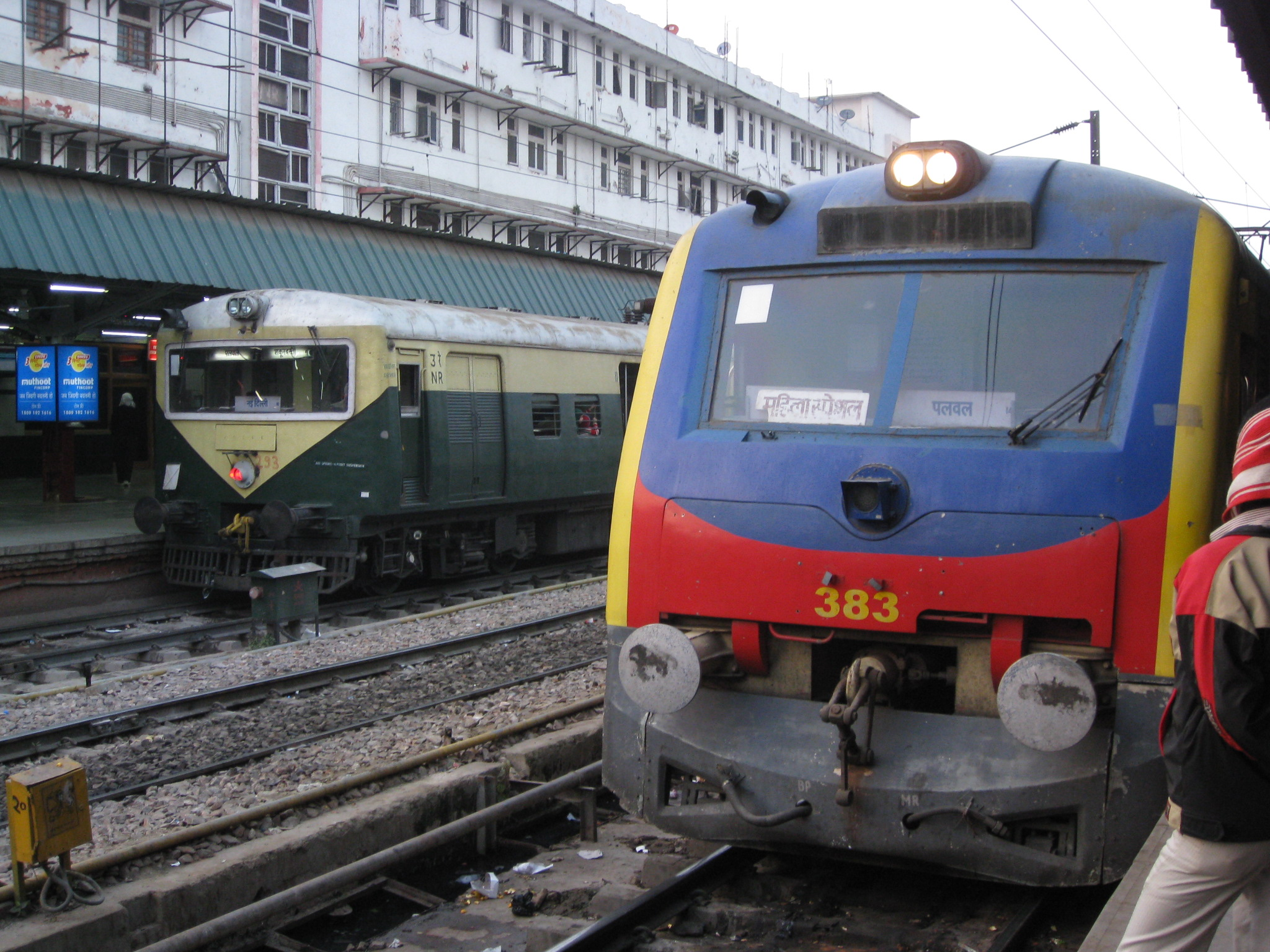
EMU (green and yellow) and MEMU (blue, red and yellow) train of Delhi suburban railway

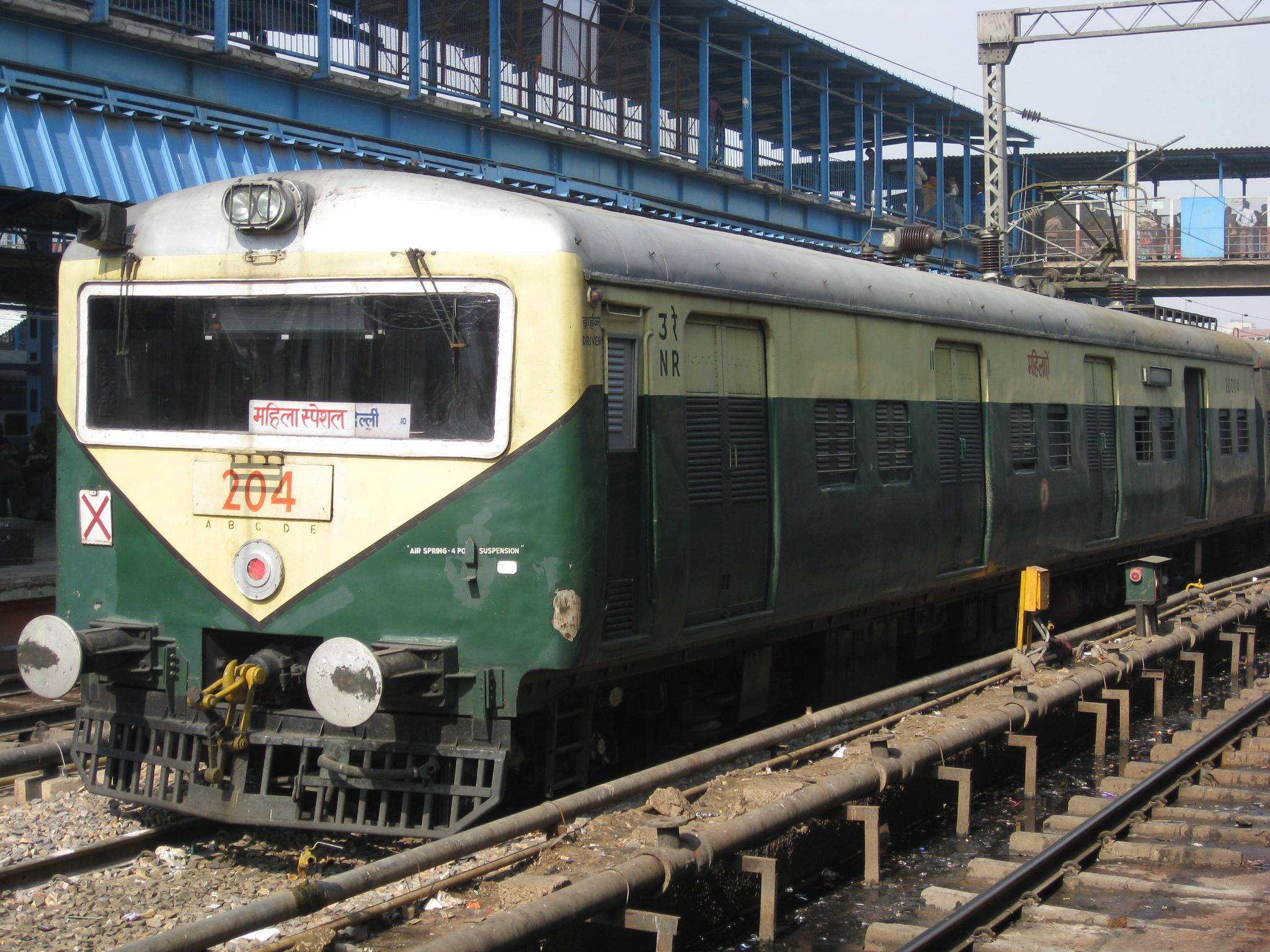
EMU ladies special train of Delhi suburban railway

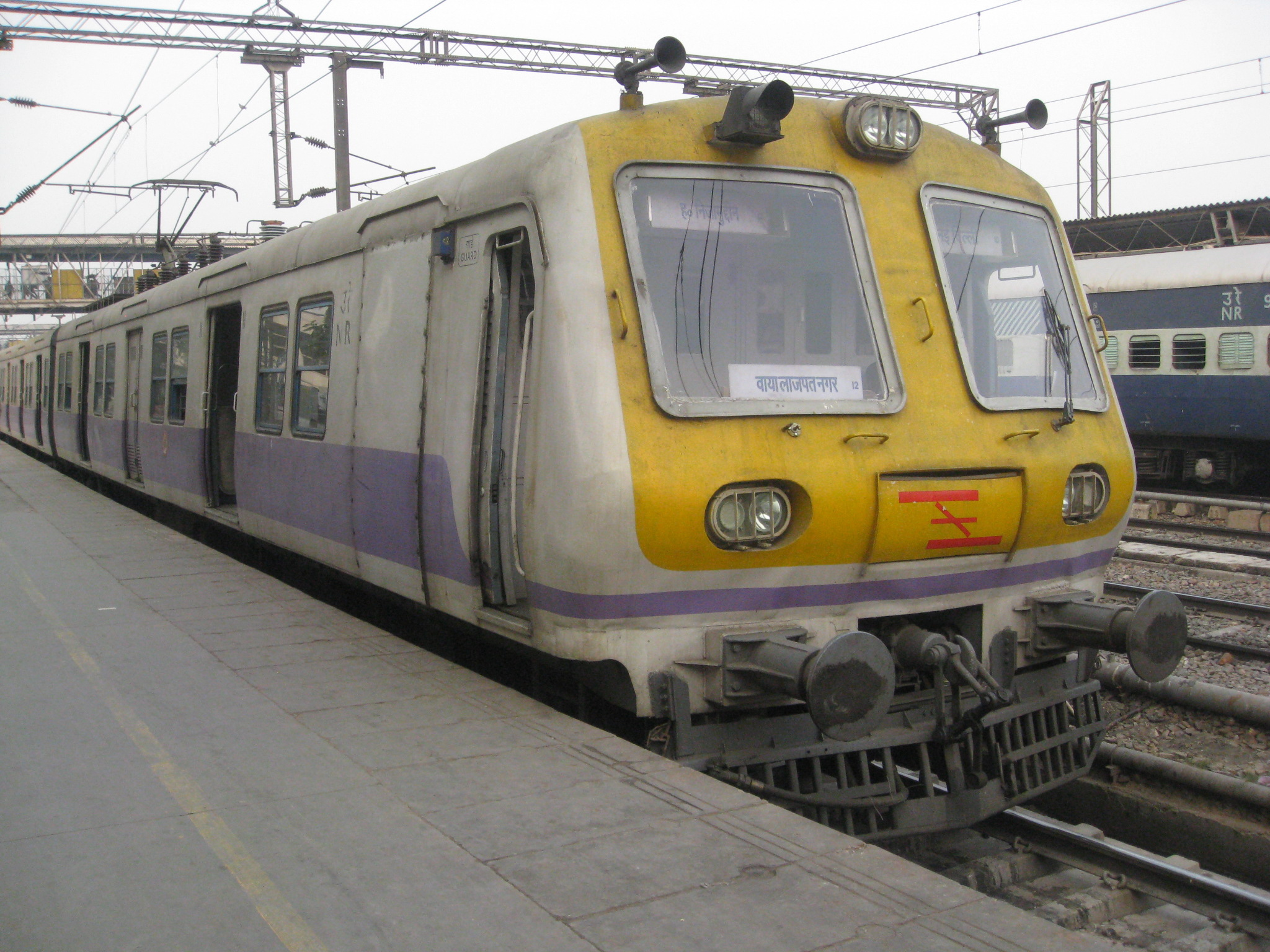
EMU train on Delhi Ring Railway of Delhi suburban railway

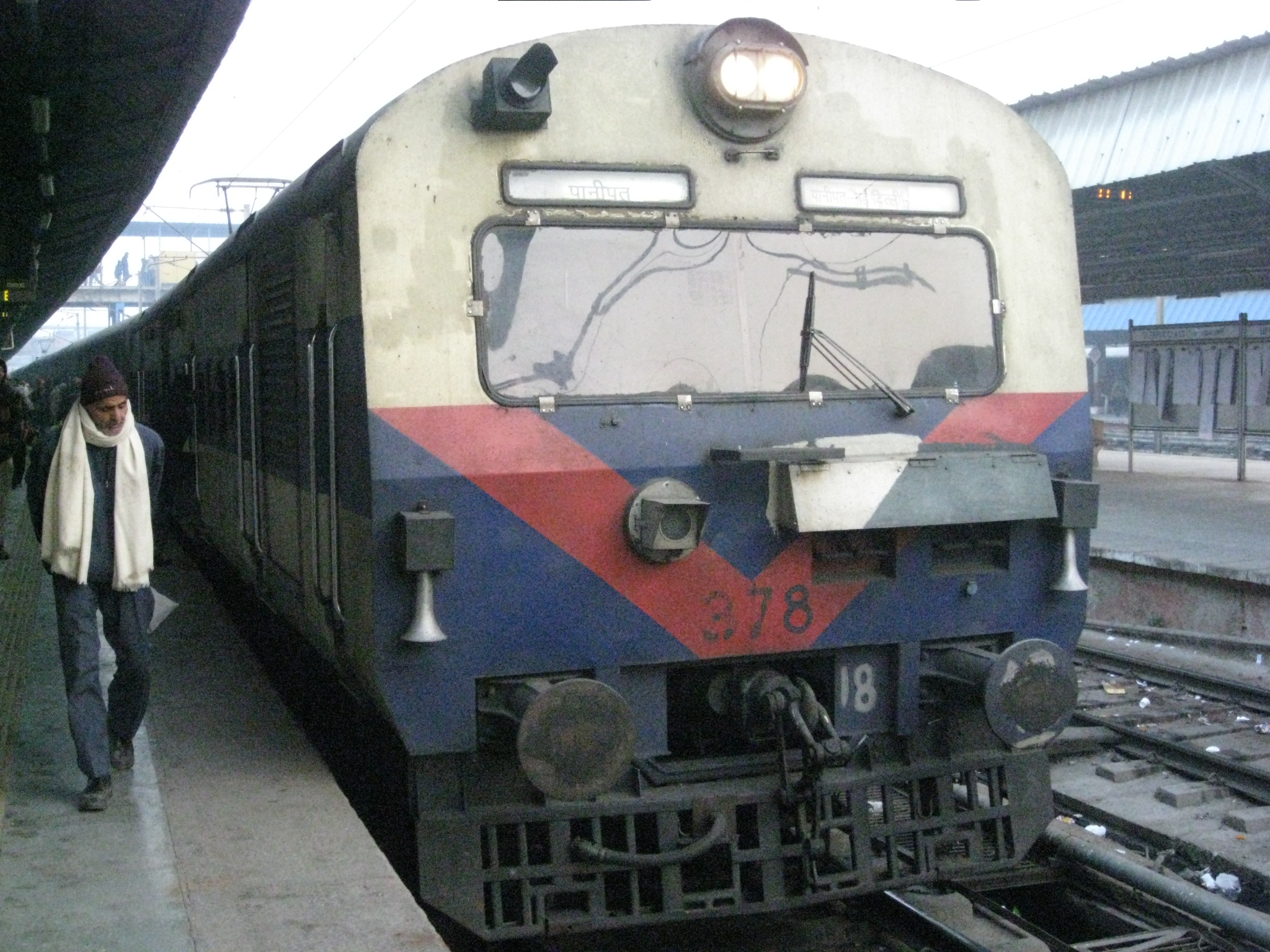
EMU train to Panipat of Delhi suburban railway

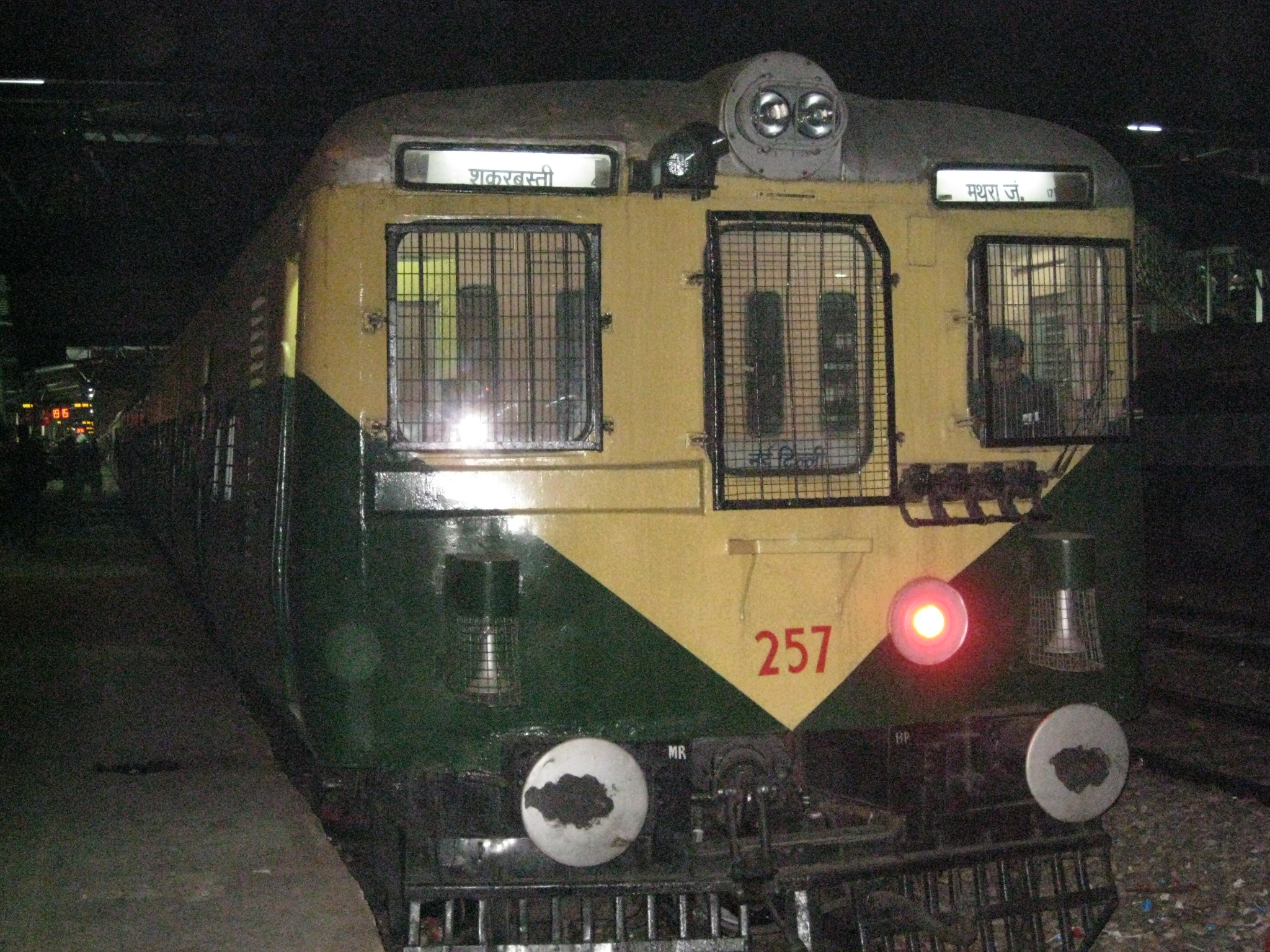
EMU train to Mathura of Delhi suburban railway

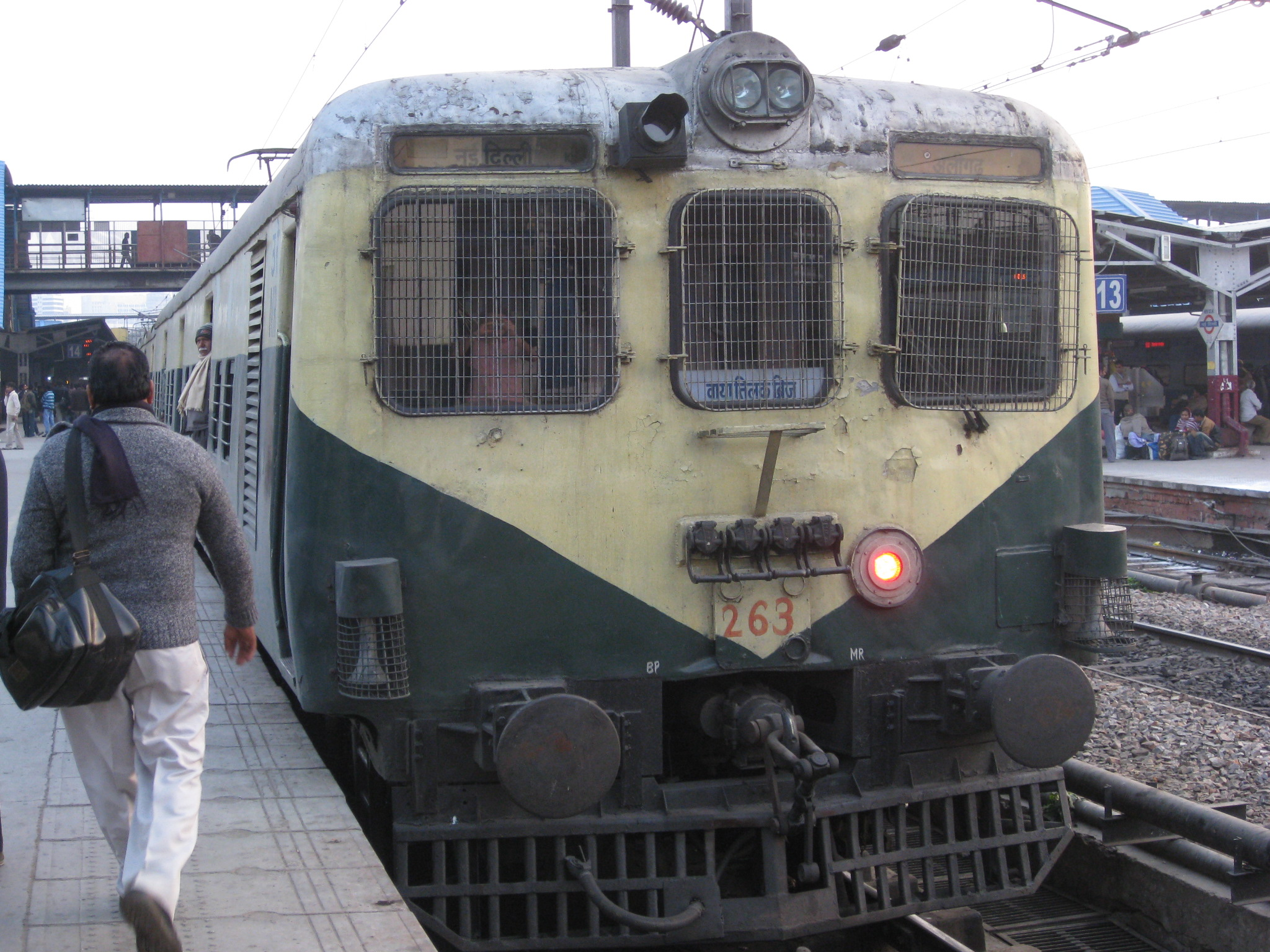
EMU train to Aligarh of Delhi suburban railway

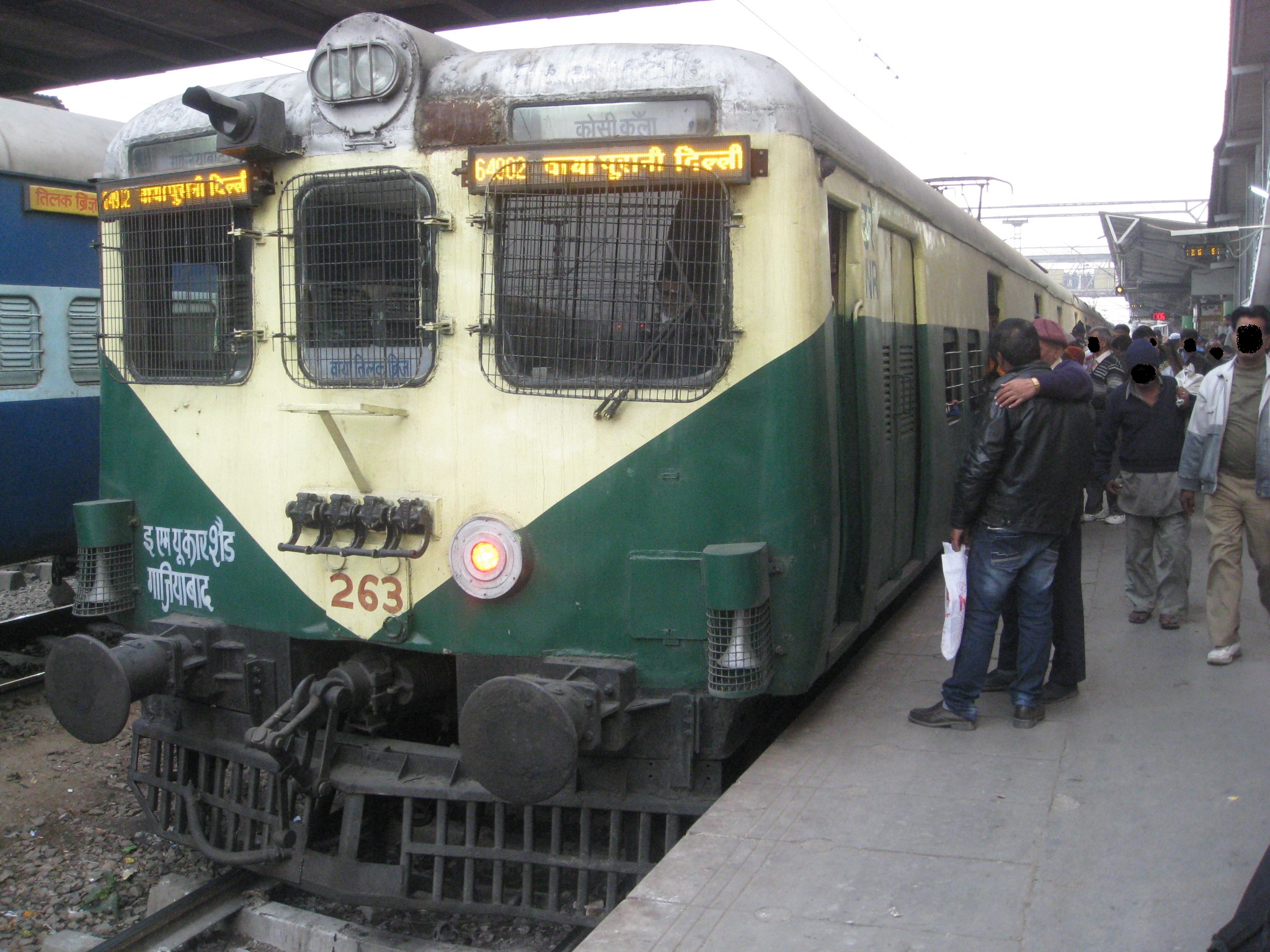
EMU train to Ghaziabad and Kosi Kala of Delhi suburban railway

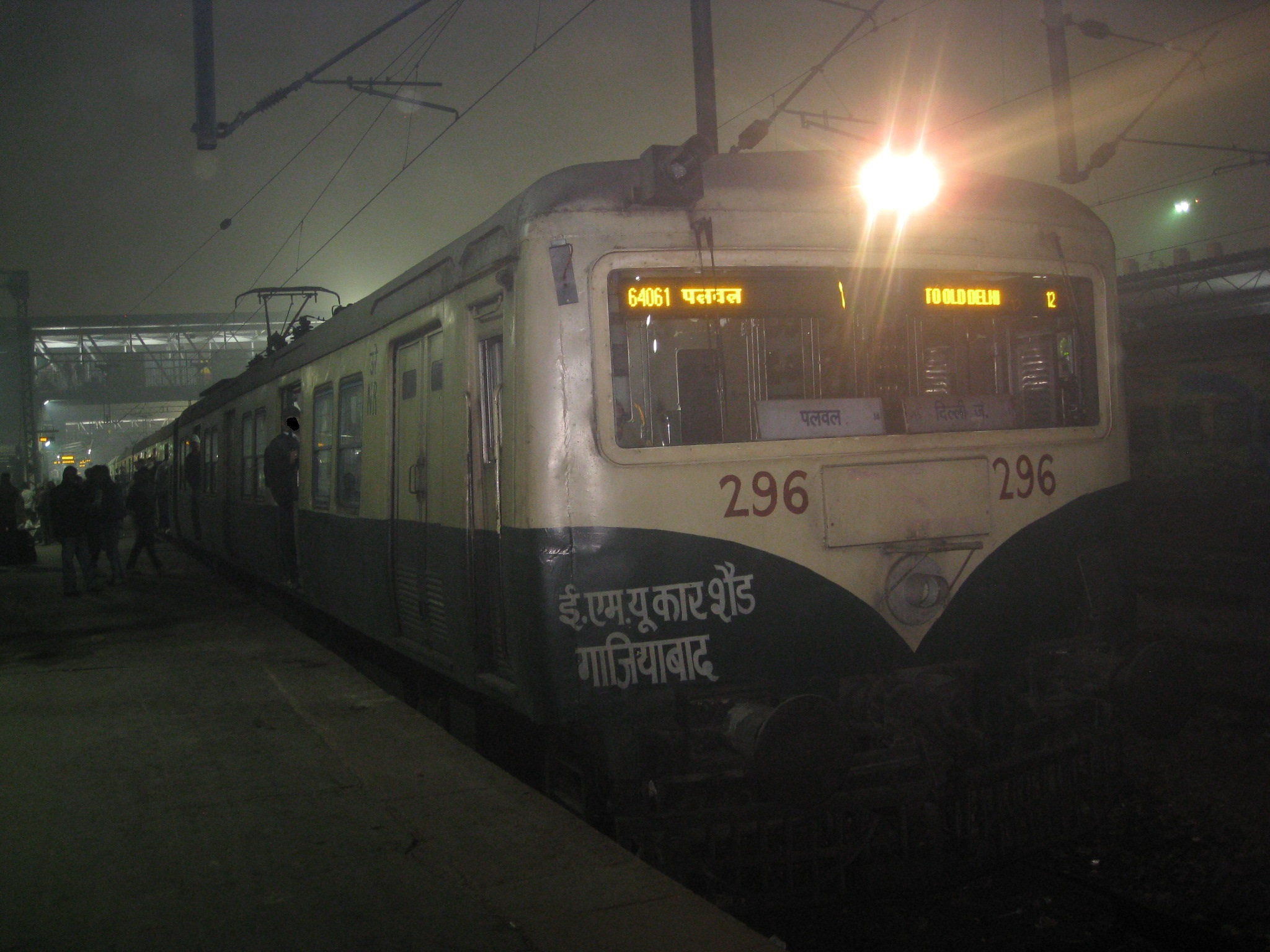
EMU train to Palwal of Delhi suburban railway

== See also ==
- Transport in Delhi
- Urban rail transit in India
- List of railway stations in Delhi
- Delhi Ring Railway
