= Nangloi railway station =

Railway Station in Delhi, India

Nangloi

General information
- Location: JJ Colony No 1, Nangloi, North Delhi district, National Capital Region; India
- Coordinates: 28.6821°N 77.0561°E
- Elevation: 108 metres (354 ft)
- System: Indian Railway and Delhi Suburban Railway station
- Owner: Indian Railways
- Operator: Northern Railway
- Platforms: 2
- Tracks: 4 (Double Electrified BG)
- Connections: Green Line Nangloi Railway Station

Construction
- Structure type: Standard (on-ground station)
- Parking: yes
- Cycle facilities: No

Other information
- Status: Functioning
- Station code: NNO
- Zone(s): Northern Railway
- Division(s): Delhi
Location
- Location within India Location within Haryana

Nangloi railway station is a small railway station in North Delhi district, National Capital Region. Its code is NNO. It serves Nangloi city. The station consists of two platforms. The platforms are not well sheltered. It lacks many facilities including water and sanitation. The station is part of Delhi Suburban Railway.

== Major trains ==
The following trains run from Nangloi railway station :

- Avadh Assam Express
- Bhiwani–Delhi Passenger (unreserved)
- Delhi–Jind Passenger (unreserved)
- Delhi–Kurukshetra DEMU (via Kaithal)
- Delhi–Rohtak Passenger (unreserved)
- Delhi–Firozpur Passenger (unreserved)
- Delhi–Jind Jakhal Passenger (unreserved)
- Delhi Jn–Rohtak MEMU
- Delhi–Narwana Passenger (unreserved)
- Delhi–Rohtak Passenger
- Dhauladhar Express
- Firozpur Janata Express
- Gorakhdham Express
- Hazrat Nizamuddin–Rohtak Passenger (unreserved)
- Jind–Delhi Passenger (unreserved)
- Kisan Express
- New Delhi–Rohtak Intercity Express
- Sirsa Express
- Udyan Abha Toofan Express
- Dhauladhar Express
