= Raipur Haryana Junction railway station =

Station in Hisar, Haryana, India

Raipur Junction railway station (Haryana) Add→{{rail-interchange}}

General information
- Location: Hisar-Raipur Road off NH-9, Raipur, Sector 1-4 Hisar, Haryana, 125044; India
- Coordinates: 29.1493°N 75.7256°E
- Elevation: 212 metres (696 ft)
- System: Express train and Passenger train station
- Owner: Indian Railways
- Lines: Bathinda–Rewari line Ludhiana–Bikaner line
- Platforms: 2
- Tracks: 2
- Bus routes: No
- Bus stands: No
- Connections: No

Construction
- Structure type: At-ground
- Platform levels: 1 (ground level)
- Parking: Yes
- Cycle facilities: Yes
- Architect: Indian
- Architectural style: Simple

Other information
- Status: Functioning
- Station code: RPHR
- Zone(s): Northern Railway zone
- Division(s): Ambala
- Fare zone: North Western Railway zone
- Classification: Passenger and freight
- Website: Official website

History
- Opened: 1 November 1913
- Original company: Rajputana–Malwa Railway
- Post-grouping: Indian Railways
Location
- Location within Haryana Location within India

Raipur Haryana Junction railway station (railway code: RPHR) is a suburban railway station under the Ambala railway division of Northern Railway zone of Indian Railways, located at Hisar city in Hisar district of Haryana state of India. The station consists of 2 broad-gauge electrified tracks of Bathinda–Rewari line. The railway station is about 6 km (3.7 mi) from each of the following, the Hisar bus station 6 km west, Hisar Junction railway station to the southwest, and Hisar Airport in the northwest.

== History ==
Hisar–Raipur-Jakhal link was operationalised on 1 November 1913, as side-spur extension of the Rajputana–Malwa Railway 1,000 mm (3 ft 3 3/8 in)-wide metre gauge Delhi–Rewari line which was earlier extended from Rewari to Hisar-Bathinda in 1884.

The 2025-26 railway budget statement, known as the Pink Book, provided for the doubling of track between Raipur to Satrod section was approved.

== Track ==
Indian Railway Line Status
Rail Line Name	Track Doubling Status	OHE Height Raising for Double-Stack Containers
Hisar-Raipur-Jakhal-Ludhiana	Yes. Hisar-Jakhal-Ludhiana completion date of December 31, 2024. (Status as of April 2021).	Yes. High-rise OHE (7.45m contact wire height) on the Rewari-Hisar-Ludhiana feeder route to the Western DFC.

== Train service ==
See trains from Hisar-Raipur to Jakhal-Bathinda, Jakhal-Patiala-Chandigarh and Jakhal-Patiala-Ludhiana-Amritsar routes.

From July 2025, the Hisar-Chandigarh train (Barwala, Uklana, Jakhal, Narwana, Kaithal, Kurukshetra, and Ambala Cantt) started from Raipur Hisar Junction station instead of main Hisar Junction railway station due to the lack of adequate number of platforms at Hisar junction. This was first such direct service from Hisar to Chandigarh in 59 years. Since train commences twice a week at 2.15 am in the mornight from the station which was mildly staffed - a station master and helper - commuters became concerned about the personality safety and the last of last mile transport connectivity.

== Issues ==
As of August 2025, Hisar junction which has only 6 platforms does not have sufficient number of platforms to handle additional trains. Consequently, newly introduced Hisar-Chandigarh train commences from the Raipur station instead of Hisar junction. This train begins from Raipur late at night, i.e. 2:25 am, since Raipur station which has only 2 railway employees lies in the outer suburbs, the passengers have concerns about the physical safety due to the lack of lighting and lack of last-mile transport thus reducing the ridership numbers.

== Present status ==
- 2021 Jul: Future plans include constructing a passenger terminal at Raipur, railway sliding to cargo terminal of Hisar Airport and rail passenger services at Hisar Airport. The budget for Raipur-Satrod section was approved in 2025-26 pink book.
- 2025 May: Budget for Raipur-Satrod track doubling was approved.

== See also ==
- Transport in Haryana
  - Hisar Airport
  - Rail transport in Haryana
- Tourism in Haryana
