= Sirsa Express =

Train in India

Overview
- Service type: Express
- Locale: Haryana & Delhi
- First service: 16 December 2009; 16 years ago
- Current operator: Northern Railway

Route
- Termini: Tilak Bridge (TKJ); Sirsa (SSA)
- Stops: 18
- Distance travelled: 265 km (165 mi)
- Average journey time: 6 hrs 40 mins
- Service frequency: Daily (Note: Runs seven days a week in each direction.)
- Train number: 14085 / 14086

On-board services
- Classes: AC Chair Car, General Unreserved
- Seating arrangements: Yes
- Sleeping arrangements: No
- Auto-rack arrangements: Overhead racks
- Catering facilities: No
- Observation facilities: Large windows
- Baggage facilities: No
- Other facilities: Below the seats

Technical
- Rolling stock: ICF coach
- Track gauge: 1,676 mm (5 ft 6 in)
- Operating speed: 43 km/h (27 mph) average including halts.
Route map
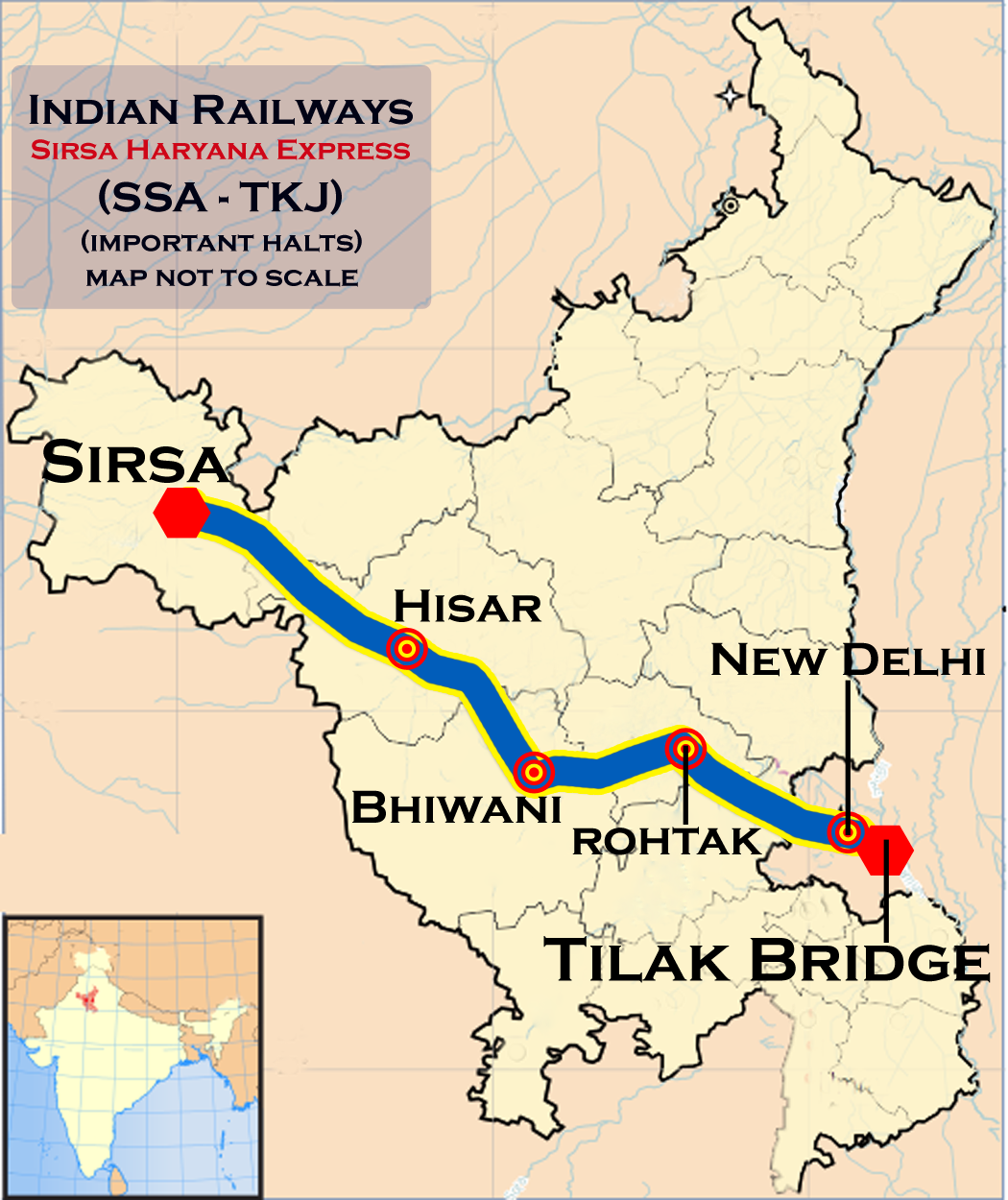

The 14085 / 14086 Sirsa Express (also known as Haryana Express) is an express train belonging to Northern Railway zone that runs between Tilak Bridge and Sirsa in India. It is currently being operated with 14085/14086 train numbers on a daily basis.

== Service ==
The 14085/Sirsa Express has an average speed of 43 km/h and covers 265 km in 6h 20 m. The 14086/Sirsa Express has an average speed of 43 km/h and covers 265 km in 6h 15 m. (55 km/h without including halt time)

== Route and halts ==
The important halts of the train are:

- Tilak Bridge
- Shivaji Bridge
- New Delhi
- Sadar Bazar
- Delhi Kishanganj
- Shakurbasti
- Nangloi
- Bahadurgarh
- Sampla
- Rohtak Junction
- Kalanaur Kalan
- Bhiwani Junction
- Bawani Khera
- Hansi
- Satrod
- Hisar Junction
- Mandi Adampur
- Bhattu
- Ding
- Sirsa

== Coach composition ==
The train has standard ICF rakes with max speed of 100 km/h. The train consists of 22 coaches:

- 20 General
- 1 General (reserved for females)
- 1 AC Chair Car

== Traction ==
Both trains are hauled by a Ghaziabad Loco Shed-based WAP-7 electric locomotive from Tilak Bridge to Sirsa and vice versa.

== Direction reversal ==
The train reverses its direction 1 time:

- Bhiwani Junction

== See also ==
- Tilak Bridge railway station
- Sirsa railway station
- Kisan Express
