= Avadh Assam Express =

Train in India

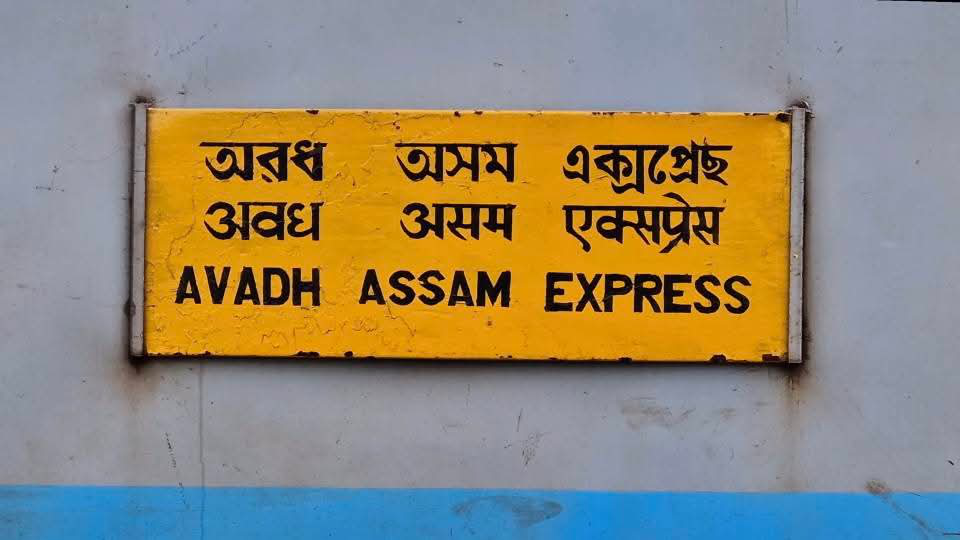
- Avadh Assam Express train board.

Overview
- Service type: Express
- Locale: Assam, Nagaland, West Bengal, Bihar, Uttar Pradesh, Delhi, Haryana, Punjab & Rajasthan
- First service: 4 April 1986; 40 years ago
- Current operator: Northeast Frontier Railway

Route
- Termini: Dibrugarh (DBRG); Lalgarh (LGH)
- Stops: 81
- Distance travelled: 3,116 km (1,936 mi)
- Average journey time: 65 hours 50 minutes
- Service frequency: Daily
- Train number: 15909 / 15910

On-board services
- Classes: AC First Class, AC 2 Tier, AC 3 Tier, Sleeper Class, General Unreserved
- Seating arrangements: Yes
- Sleeping arrangements: Yes
- Catering facilities: Available
- Observation facilities: Large windows
- Baggage facilities: Available
- Other facilities: Below the seats

Technical
- Rolling stock: LHB coach
- Track gauge: 1,676 mm (5 ft 6 in)
- Operating speed: 130 km/h (81 mph) maximum, 47 km/h (29 mph) average including halts.
Route map
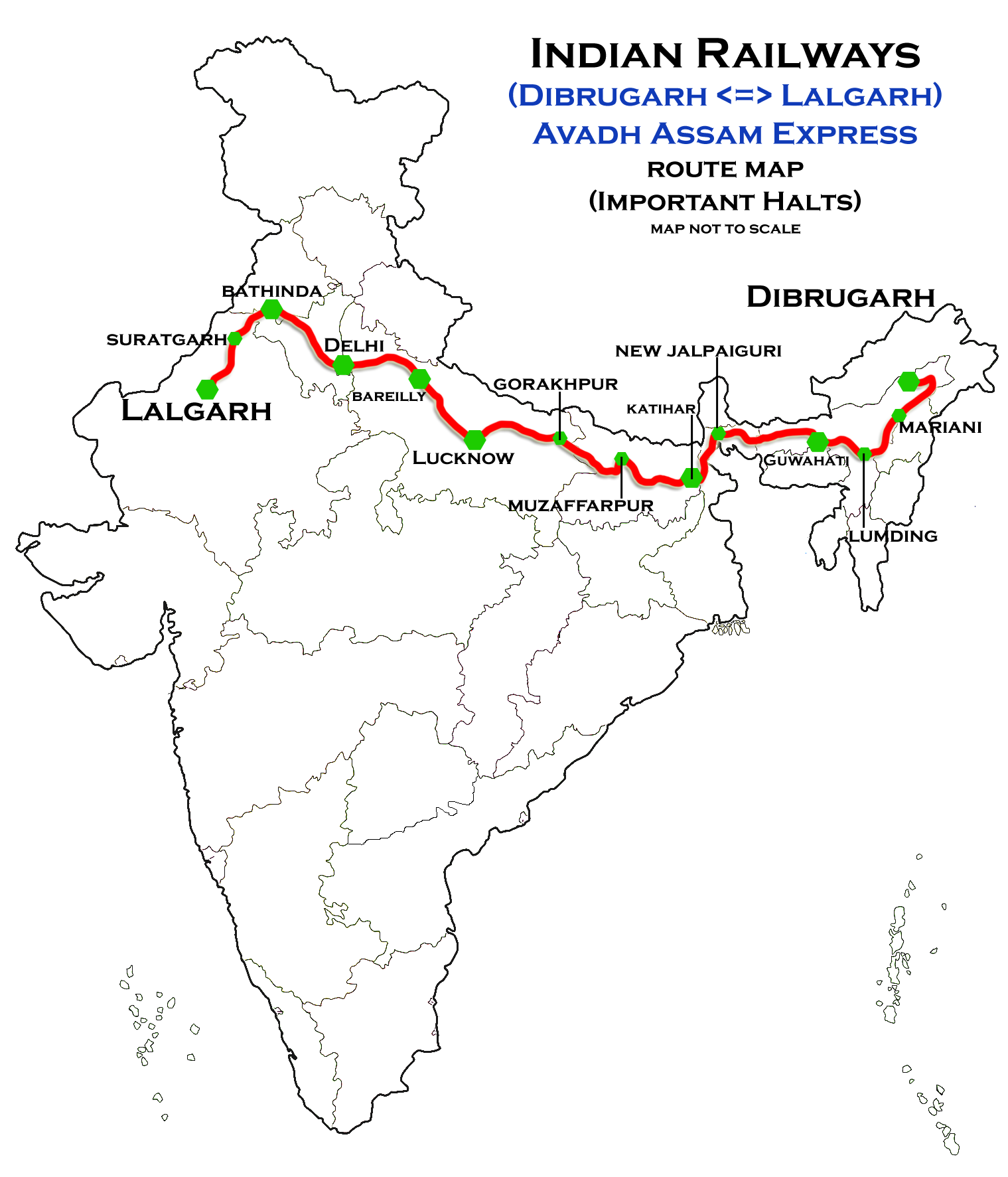

The 15909 / 15910 Avadh Assam Express is an express train operated by Northeast Frontier Railway zone that runs between Dibrugarh railway station of Dibrugarh, Assam and Lalgarh Junction of Bikaner, Rajasthan in India.

The train has a lengthy route and frequently suffers from delays.

It operates as train number 15909 from Dibrugarh to Lalgarh Junction and as train number 15910 in the reverse direction, serving the nine states of Assam, Nagaland, West Bengal, Bihar, Uttar Pradesh, Delhi, Haryana, Punjab and Rajasthan.

A metre-gauge train from Lucknow to Guwahati Awadh Tirhoot Mail used to run until gauge conversion took place and the BG Avadh Assam Express was started in late 1980s. Agra Fort to Guwahati Vaishali MG Express (via Silliguri), Kathgodam to Tinsukia MG Express and Lucknow–Guwahati MG Express were long-distance trains on MG in Lucknow.

== Coaches ==
The 15909/15910 Avadh Assam Express presently has 1 First AC Cum 2 Tier(HA1), 2 AC 2 Tier(A1&A2), 6 AC 3 Tier(B1 to B6), 06 Sleeper Class(S1 to S6), 3 General Unreserved & 2 EOG (Generator cum Luggage Van) coaches. In addition, it carries a pantry car & up to 1 High Capacity Parcel Vans.

As is customary with most train services in India, coach composition may be amended at the discretion of Indian Railways depending on demand.

Coach Composition:-

LOCO	HCPV1	EoG	GEN	GEN	GEN	B6	B5	B4	B3	B2	B1	A2	A1	HA1	PC	S5	S4	S3	S2	S1	GEN	GEN	SLR	HCPV2

== Service ==
The 15909 Avadh Assam Express covers the distance of 3118 kilometres in almost 68 hours [45.90 km/h (29 mph)] & in 68 hours as 15910 Avadh Assam Express [46.32 km/h (29 mph)].

As the average speed of the train is below 55 km/h (34 mph), as per Indian Railways rules, its fare does not include a superfast surcharge.

== Routeing ==
The 15909 Avadh Assam Express runs from

ASSAM

1. Dibrugarh
2. New Tinsukia
3. Bhojo
4. Simaluguri Junction
5. Mariani Junction
6. Furkating Junction
7. Sarupathar
8. Diphu
9. Lumding Junction
10. Hojai
11. Kampur
12. Chaparmukh Junction
13. Jagiroad
14. Guwahati
15. Kamakhya Junction
16. Rangiya Junction
17. Barpeta Road
18. New Bongaigaon Junction
19. Kokrajhar
20. Fakiragram Junction

NAGALAND

1. Dimapur

WEST BENGAL

1. New Alipurduar
2. New Cooch Behar
3. Dhupguri
4. Jalpaiguri Road
5. New Jalpaiguri (Siliguri)
6. Aluabari Road Junction
7. Dalkhola

BIHAR

1. Kishanganj
2. Barsoi Junction
3. Azamnagar Road
4. Katihar
5. Naugachia
6. Thana Bihpur
7. Mansi
8. Khagaria Junction
9. Begusarai
10. Barauni
11. Dalsinghsarai
12. Samastipur
13. Muzaffarpur
14. Hajipur
15. Chhapra
16. Siwan
17. Mairwa

UTTAR PRADESH

1. Bhatpar Rani
2. Bhatni
3. Deoria Sadar
4. Gorakhpur
5. Khalilabad
6. Basti
7. Mankapur Junction
8. Gonda
9. Barabanki Junction
10. Lucknow Charbagh
11. Balamau
12. Hardoi
13. Shahjahanpur
14. Bareilly
15. Rampur Junction
16. Moradabad
17. Amroha
18. Hapur Junction
19. Pilkhuwa
20. Ghaziabad

DELHI

1. Delhi Junction
2. Delhi Kishanganj
3. Shakurbasti
4. Nangloi

HARYANA

1. Bahadurgarh
2. Rohtak
3. Jind Junction
4. Narwana
5. Tohana
6. Jakhal Mandi
7. Mandi Dabwali

PUNJAB

1. Bareta
2. Budhlada
3. Mansa
4. Maur Mandi
5. Bathinda Junction

RAJASTHAN

1. Sangaria
2. Hanumangarh
3. Pilibanga
4. Suratgarh
5. Lunkaransar
6. Lalgarh Junction.

== Direction reversal ==
It reverses direction of travel once at;

- Bathinda Junction.

== Traction ==
Due to partially electrification of the route, a total of 3 locomotives are assigned to this train:

- First in earlier 90s was WDM-2 used to pull this train and encountered a tragedy Gaisal train collision
- Then in 2010s this train is hauled by WDP-4 / WDP-4B / WDP-4D diesel locomotive of Siliguri Loco Shed from Dibrugarh up to Guwahati handing over to an Ghaziabad Loco Shed based WAP-7 electric locomotive which hauls the train up to Bathinda Junction following which a Bhagat Ki Kothi Loco Shed based WDP-4 / WDP-4B / WDP-4D diesel locomotive powers the train for the remainder of its journey until Lalgarh Junction.
- In 2020s this train is hauled by WAP 7 of Siliguri shed locomotive throughout the journey. The same locomotive is used after loco reversal at Bathinda junction. Sometimes Ghaziabad or Bhagat ki kothi shed WAP-7 locomotive after loco reversal at Bathinda junction.

== Incidents ==
In 1999, the infamous Gaisal train disaster occurred between Avadh Assam Express and Brahmaputra Mail at Gaisal railway station near Kishanganj railway station.

== Timings ==
- 15909 Avadh Assam Express leaves Dibrugarh on a daily basis at 10:20 hrs IST and reaches Lalgarh Junction at 04:10 hrs IST on the 4th day.
- 15910 Avadh Assam Express leaves Lalgarh Junction on a daily basis at 19:50 hrs IST and reaches Dibrugarh at 15:35 hrs IST on the 4th day.

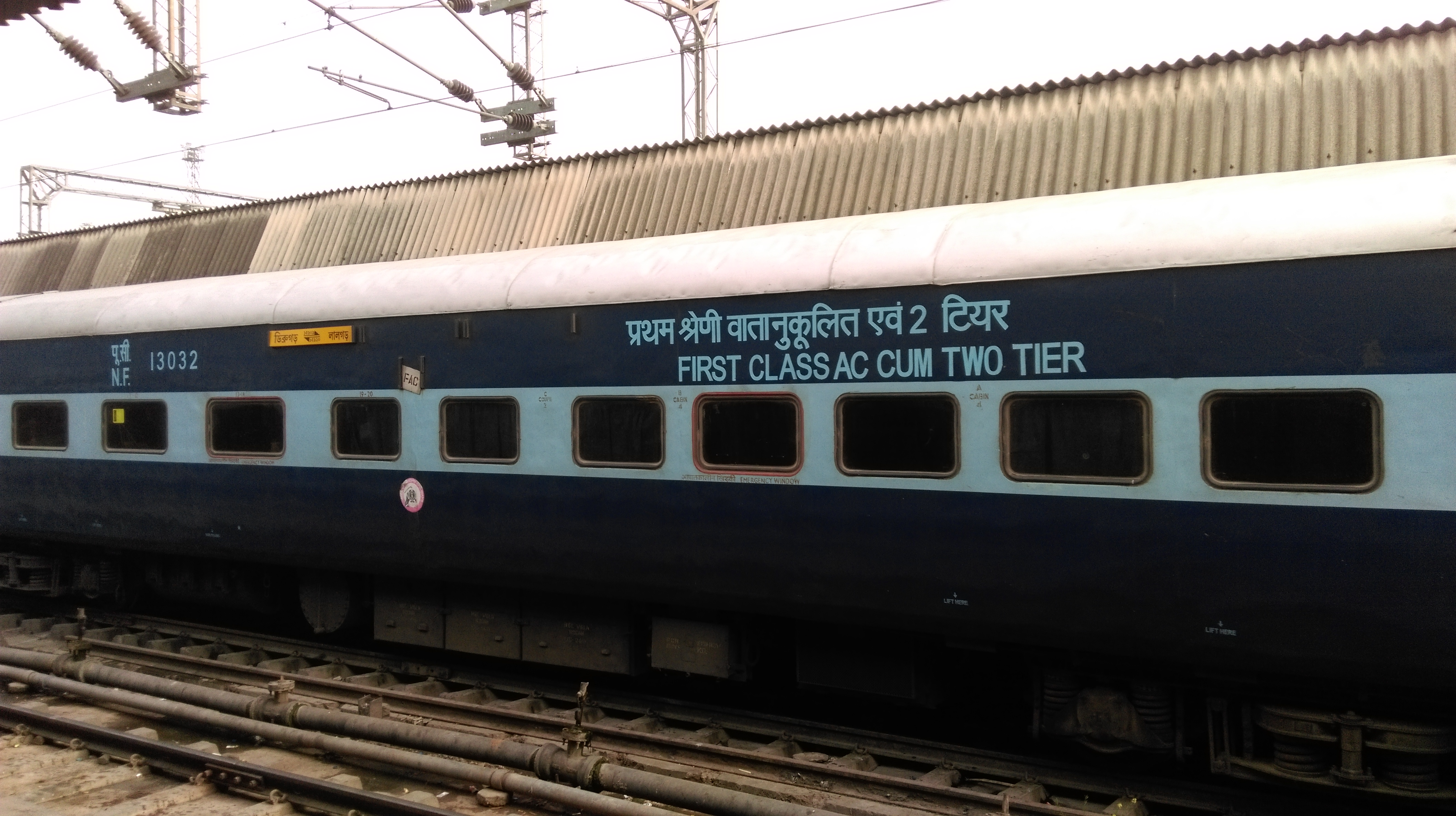
Avadh Assam Express - First AC cum AC Two-tier coach

== See also ==
- Gaisal train disaster
