= Lalgarh (disambiguation) =

Lalgarh may refer to:

- Lalgarh, Jhargram, a village in Midnapore district of West Bengal, India
- Lalgarh, Rajasthan, a village in tehsil Bidasar of Churu district in Rajasthan, India
- Lalgarh Palace, a palace in Bikaner in the state of Rajasthan, India
- Lalgarh Junction railway station, the main railway station in Churu district, Rajasthan, India
