= Nathwana railway station =

Railway station in Rajasthan, India

Nathwana

General information
- Location: Nathwana, Bikaner district, Rajasthan; India
- Coordinates: 28.563319°N 73.813703°E
- Elevation: 197 metres (646 ft)
- System: Indian Railways station
- Owner: Indian Railways
- Operator: North Western Railway
- Line: Jodhpur–Bathinda line
- Platforms: 1
- Tracks: Single Electric-Line

Construction
- Structure type: Standard (on-ground station)

Other information
- Status: Functioning
- Station code: NTZ
- Zone(s): North Western Railway
- Division(s): Bikaner

Services
Preceding station	Indian Railways	Following station
Lunkaransar towards ?	North Western Railway zone Jodhpur–Bathinda line	Malkisar towards ?
Location
- Interactive map

Nathwana railway station is a railway station located on the Jodhpur–Bathinda railway line operated by the North Western Railway zone under Bikaner railway division. It is situated at Nathwana in Bikaner district in the Indian state of Rajasthan.
