= Gorakhdham Express =

Train in India

Gorakhdham Superfast Express
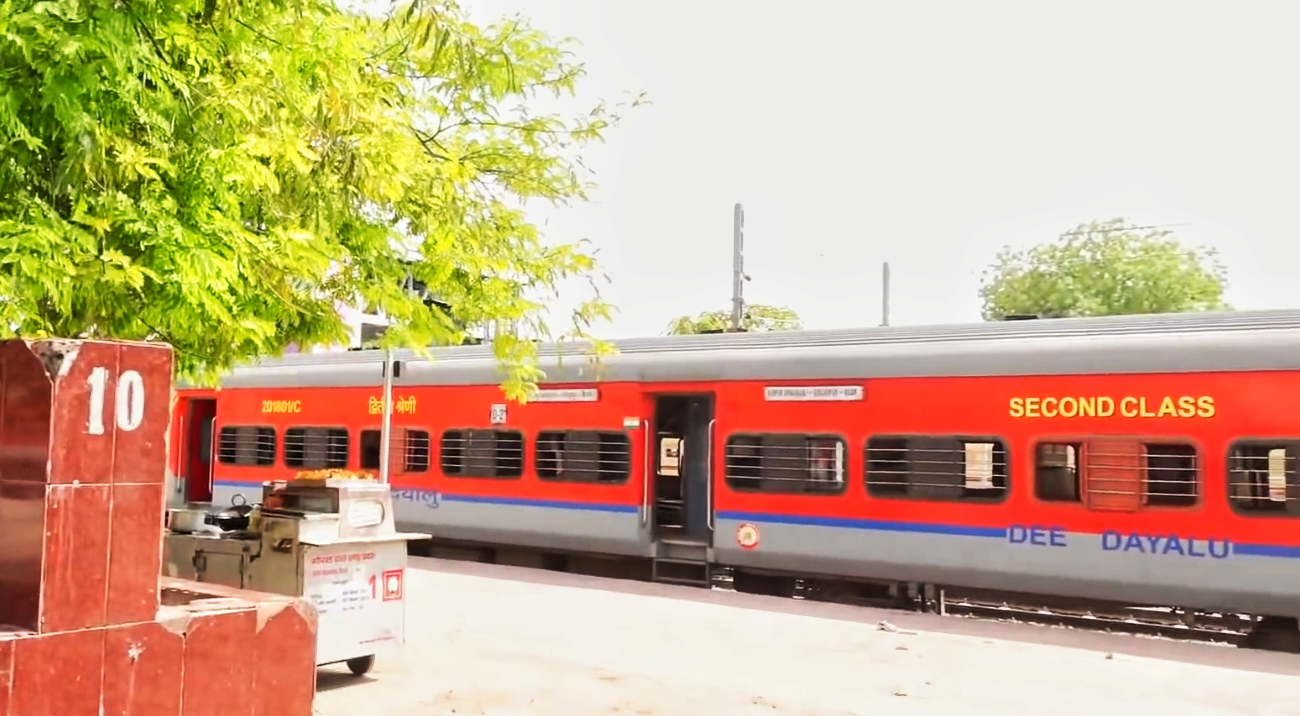
- Gorakhdham Superfast Express at Hisar Jn.

Overview
- Service type: Superfast Express
- Locale: Uttar Pradesh, Delhi, Haryana & Punjab
- First service: 12 July 2003; 22 years ago
- Current operator: North Eastern Railway

Route
- Termini: Gorakhpur (GKP); Bathinda (BTI)
- Stops: 13
- Distance travelled: 969 km (602 mi)
- Average journey time: 16 hrs 55 mins
- Service frequency: Daily
- Train number: 12555 / 12556

On-board services
- Classes: AC First Class, AC 2 Tier, AC 3 Tier, Sleeper Class, General Unreserved
- Seating arrangements: Yes
- Sleeping arrangements: Yes
- Catering facilities: On-board catering, E-catering
- Observation facilities: Large windows
- Baggage facilities: Available
- Other facilities: Below the seats

Technical
- Rolling stock: LHB coach
- Track gauge: 1,676 mm (5 ft 6 in); Broad Gauge
- Operating speed: 64 km/h (40 mph) average including halts.

The 12555 / 12556 Gorakhdham Superfast Express is a daily superfast express train of Indian Railways, which runs between the cities of Gorakhpur in Uttar Pradesh and Bathinda in Punjab.

It is considered one of the important trains of North Eastern Railway and Indian Railways as well. Recently the train is running with the new LHB rakes.

== Overview ==
This train is named after Guru Gorakhnath. Gorakhdham means Place of Guru Gorakhnath.
It is ISO 9001:2015 certified train of Indian Railways.
Cleanliness and safety of passengers is the first motive of this train. Regular security inspection of train is performed on-board by police personnel. Sniffer dogs inspect the train before the commencement of journey from Gorakhpur Junction.
On-board housekeeping service regularly & on-demand cleans the toilets and coaches with feedback authorization from passengers.

Train got LHB coach from 14 March 2019.

== History ==
Earlier this train used to run combined with Vaishali Express between Gorakhpur Junction & New Delhi.
Independent operation of this train was demanded and Indian Railways foresaw the possibility of this. North Eastern Railway was assigned with the responsibility of presenting report on the practicality of this train. Project report was presented before the Railway Board and it was allowed.
Hence in the year of 1998, Gorakhdham Express commenced its first independent operation from Gorakhpur Junction to New Delhi as an express train having bi-weekly frequency. Soon after its first journey, this train was extended up to Rohtak Junction, it was declared Superfast Express and its frequency was made daily service.
Few months later this train was again extended to Bhiwani Junction and this train operated between Gorakhpur Junction & Bhiwani Junction via New Delhi.
Again after few years of service this train was extended till Hisar Junction and recently extended up to Bhatinda Junction then this train operates between Gorakhpur Junction & Bhatinda Junction from 14 July 2022.

This is the first Superfast Express train of Bhatinda Junction.

== Facilities ==
This train has facility of E-catering for providing food from Domino's Pizza etc. & on-board catering, for providing snacks, foods, tea/coffee, beverages.
On-demand housekeeping service is provided, which maintains the cleanness of coaches, as well as of toilets.

== Route & halts ==
- Gorakhpur Junction
- Khalilabad
- Basti
- Babhnan
- Gonda Junction
- Barabanki Junction
- Lucknow Charbagh
- Unnao Junction
- Kanpur Central
- New Delhi
- Nangloi
- Rohtak Junction
- Bhiwani Junction
- Hisar Junction
- Sirsa
- Bathinda Junction

== Schedule ==
Train number	Station code	Departure station	Departure time	Departure day	Arrival station	Arrival time	Arrival day
12555	GKP	Gorakhpur Junction	4:20 PM	Daily	Bathinda Junction	12:40 PM	(Daily) next day
12556	BTI	Bathinda Junction	2:00 PM	Daily	Gorakhpur Junction	9:45 AM	(Daily) next day

== Accommodation ==
This train consists of 22 coaches – 4 Sleeper coaches, 9 3rd Air-Conditioned coaches, 2 2nd Ac coaches 1 1st Ac coach & 3 Unreserved coaches and 1 EOG.
13 Air-Conditioned coaches consists of 1 First Class, 2 Second Class & 10 Third Class coaches.

== Management ==
This train is owned, operated & maintained by Lucknow division of North Eastern Railway zone of Indian Railways.
Being prioritized & important train, North Eastern Railway Headquarters Gorakhpur Junction itself monitors this train for better quality & services.
This train is one of the most important trains of Hissar, as well as of Gorakhpur Junction.

== Traction ==
It is hauled by a Gonda Loco Shed-based WAP-7 electric locomotive between Gorakhpur Junction & Bathinda Junction and vice versa.

== Accidents ==
In dense fog on 2 January 2010, the Gorakhdham Express and Prayagraj Express collided near the Panki railway station in Kanpur, about 60 miles (100 kilometers) southwest of Lucknow. Ten people died and about 51 were injured.

On 26 May 2014, it rammed into a stationary goods train near Khalilabad station in Sant Kabir Nagar district of Uttar Pradesh, on its way to Gorakhpur. More than 40 people were killed and over 150 were injured.

In 2004, the train hit a truck which was standing on tracks. Luckily the truck was driverless.

== Gallery ==
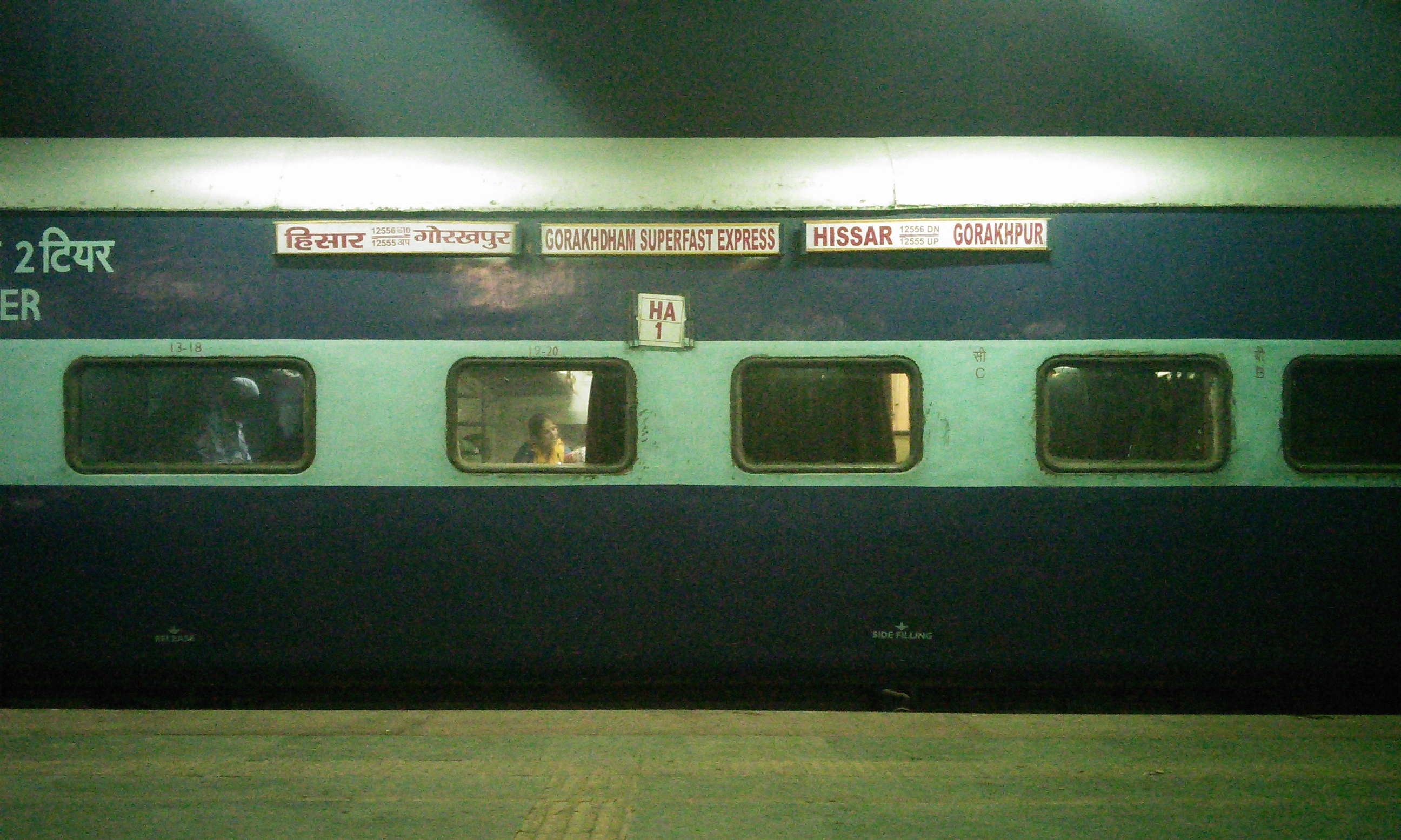
HA1 coach of Gorakhdham Express

Sleeper coach of the train

AC 3 Tier, B2 coach of the train
