= Shakurbasti railway station =

Rail station in Delhi, India

Shakur Basti

General information
- Location: Shakur Basti, Delhi, National Capital Territory, 110034; India
- Coordinates: 28.6816°N 77.1280°E
- Elevation: 216 m (709 ft)
- System: Indian Railway and Delhi Suburban Railway station
- Owner: Indian Railways
- Line: Delhi Ring Railway
- Platforms: 2 BG
- Tracks: 4 BG
- Connections: Green Line Shivaji Park

Construction
- Structure type: Standard (on ground station)
- Parking: Available
- Cycle facilities: Available
- Accessible: Disabled access

Other information
- Station code: SSB
- Fare zone: Northern Railways

Services
Preceding station	Indian Railways	Following station
Mangolpuri HALT towards ?	Northern Railway zone Delhi Ring Railway	Dayabasti towards ?
Location
- Location within India Location within Delhi

Shakur Basti railway station is a railway station in Shakur Basti which is a residential and commercial neighborhood of the North Delhi district of Delhi. Its code is SSB. The station is part of Delhi Suburban Railway. It consists of four platforms. The station complex occupies a huge area, including Shakur Basti Diesel Shed, Railway Store House, Cement Siding and other complexes.

== Major trains ==
Some of the major trains running from this railway station are as follows:

- Andaman Express
- Avadh Assam Express
- Dhauladhar Express
- Durgavati Express
- Firozpur Cantt Express
- Firozpur Janata Express
- Ganganagar Express
- Gorakhdham Express
- Himsagar Express
- Kalindi Express
- Kisan Express
- Mussoorie Express
- Navyug Express
- Patalkot Express
- Punjab Mail
- Rohtak Intercity Express
- Sirsa Express
- Swarn Nagari Express
- Tirunelveli SMVD Express
- Tripura Sundari Express

== Diesel Loco Shed, Shakurbasti ==
The loco shed was established in 1955 for shunting duties in the Delhi region. It used to hold WDS-2, WDS-4, WDS-6 and WDM-2 locomotives. Now it functions as a DEMU carshed.

== See also ==
- Anand Vihar Railway Terminal
- Delhi Junction Railway station
- Delhi Metro
- Hazrat Nizamuddin railway station
- New Delhi Railway Station
- Sarai Rohilla Railway Station
