= Sant Nagar, Rani Bagh =

Sant Nagar comes under Shakur Basti assembly constituency in India. It comes under Rani Bagh which is MCD ward No. 66. This place is often confused with Sant Nagar located in Burari Delhi. Sant Nagar is a developing area and is a neighboring locality of Rishi Nagar, Rani Bagh, Multani Mohalla, Sainik Vihar, Saraswati Vihar.

== Accessibility ==
Sant Nagar is accessible by road, rail and metro. The nearest metro station is Kohat Enclave. The nearest Railway Station (minor) is Shakur Basti and Major is Delhi Sarai Rohilla

The station is in provision of siksha agarwal (Director of northern railways)

== Political leaders ==
Member of Legislative Assembly:- Shri Karnaol Singh (BJP) (Shakur Basti)
Councillor:- Shrimati Vandana Jaitley (Bharatiya Janata Party)
Ex MLA- Shri Shyamlal Garg (Bhartiya Janata Party)

== Major landmarks ==
1. Shri Nandlal Chachra Community Hall, Rani Bagh
2. Aggarwal City Mall (M2K Cinemas, Pitampura)
3. Chunmun mall
4. Swami Dayanand Saraswati Chowk
5. Fountain Chowk
