= Rani Bagh =

Rani Bagh may refer to:

- Rani Bagh, Delhi in India
- Rani Bagh, Hyderabad in Pakistan
- Ranibagh township near Haldwani and Kathgodam in Uttarakhand
- Victoria Gardens, or Jijamata Udyaan in Bombay, India
