= Amin railway station =

Railway station in Haryana, India

Amin

General information
- Location: Kurukshetra, Haryana; India
- Coordinates: 29.9047°N 76.8995°E
- Elevation: 258 metres (846 ft)
- System: Indian Railways station
- Owner: Indian Railways
- Operator: North Western Railway
- Line: Delhi–Rewari line
- Platforms: 2

Construction
- Structure type: Standard on ground

Other information
- Status: Functioning
- Station code: AMN
Location
- Location within Haryana

Amin Railway Station is a station, located in Kurukshetra district, is a railway station in Haryana, India.
