= Satrod railway station =

Railway station in Haryana, India

General information
- Location: NH-9, Hisar, Haryana; India
- Coordinates: 29.1262°N 75.7181°E
- Elevation: 212 metres (696 ft)
- System: Express train and Passenger train station
- Owner: Indian Railways
- Line: Bathinda–Rewari line
- Platforms: 2
- Tracks: 2
- Connections: Auto rickshaw stand, Rickshaw stand

Construction
- Structure type: At-ground
- Platform levels: 1 (ground level)
- Parking: Yes
- Cycle facilities: Yes
- Architectural style: simple

Other information
- Status: Functioning
- Station code: STD
- Zone(s): North Western Railway zone
- Division(s): Bikaner
- Fare zone: North Western Railway zone
- Classification: Passenger and freight

History
- Opened: 1873
Location
- Location within Haryana Location within India

Satrod railway station (railway code: STD) is a suburban railway station under the Ambala railway division of Northern Railway zone of Indian Railways, located at Hisar city in Hisar district of Haryana state of India. The station consists of 2 broad-gauge electrified tracks of Bathinda–Rewari line. The Satrod railway station is about 6 km (3.7 mi) west of Hisar bus station, 11 km (6.8 mi) west of Hisar Junction railway station, and 6 km (3.7 mi) southwest of Hisar Airport.

== History ==
=== 1873: construction ===
Satrod station, built in 1873, lies on the Delhi-Rewari-Satrod-Hisar-Raipur-Bathinda line.

In 1873 during the British Raj, the Rajputana–Malwa Railway extended the 1,000 mm (3 ft 3 3/8 in)-wide metre-gauge Delhi–Rewari line to Hisar, and then to Bhatinda in 1883–84, connecting it all the way to Karachi via Delhi–Karachi line. The metre-gauge Hisar–Sadulpur link was converted to broad gauge in 2009. In 2013, track doubling and electrification of Hisar–Rewari track via Hansi and Bhiwani commenced, which was completed in 2016. In 201718, the Hisar–Bhatinda via Sirsa electrification was completed.

=== Rohtak-Hansi line ===
In 2023, Rohtak–Hansi line, while Hansi-Satrod-Hisar section already existed since 1873, was completed and regular scheduled goods train operation had started in December 2023.

=== Upgrades ===
In January 2025, Northern Railway Zone was preparing DPR for a 25 km long Satrod-Dabra-Chiraud rail bypass for good trains and doubling of Hisar-Jakhal line. Earlier in 2024, the FSL (Final Location Survey) for these were completed. The survey for 25 km long railway bypass track from Hisar's Satrod to Chiraud via Dabra, Deva, Muklan has been completed and sent to railway headquarter for budget approval, and budget for DPR preparation is already in fy2025-26 pink book. This will allow freight trains to bypass the Hisar railway station freeing up the platforms for operation of more passenger trains.

In 2025-26 pink book, the budget for Raipur-Satrod track doubling was approved.

As announced in 2025, a dedicated restricted-access military yard will be constructed at Satroad railway station at the cost of Rs 124 crore, which will have 6 dedicated lines, automated digital control system, large ramp and loading platforms for the swift automated loading and unloading.

== See also ==
- Transport in Haryana
  - Hisar Airport
  - Rail transport in Haryana
- Tourism in Haryana
