= Biradhwal railway station =

Railway station in Rajasthan, India

Biradhwal

General information
- Location: Birdhol, Sri Ganganagar district, Rajasthan; India
- Coordinates: 29.174117°N 73.896516°E
- Elevation: 191 metres (627 ft)
- System: Indian Railways station
- Owner: Indian Railways
- Operator: North Western Railway
- Line: Jodhpur–Bathinda line
- Platforms: 1
- Tracks: Single Electric-Line

Construction
- Structure type: Standard (on-ground station)

Other information
- Status: Functioning
- Station code: BDWL
- Zone(s): North Western Railway
- Division(s): Bikaner

Services
| Preceding station | Indian Railways | Following station |
|---|---|---|
| Rajiyasar towards ? | North Western Railway zone Jodhpur–Bathinda line | Pipran towards ? |
Location
- Interactive map

Biradhwal railway station is a railway station located on the Jodhpur–Bathinda railway line operated by the North Western Railway zone under Bikaner railway division. It is situated at Birdhol in Sri Ganganagar district in the Indian state of Rajasthan.
