= Sirsa railway station =

Railway Station in Haryana, India

Sirsa Railway Station

General information
- Location: Railway Station Road, Sirsa, Sirsa district, Haryana; India
- Coordinates: 29.5396°N 75.0347°E
- Elevation: 203 metres (666 ft)
- System: Indian Railways station
- Owner: Indian Railways
- Operator: North Western Railway Bikaner Division
- Line: Hisar–Bathinda line
- Platforms: 2
- Tracks: 5

Construction
- Structure type: Standard (on-ground station)
- Parking: Yes
- Accessible: No

Other information
- Status: Single, Electric Line
- Station code: SSA
- Zone(s): North Western Railway
- Division(s): Bikaner

History
- Opened: 1884
Location

Sirsa Railway Station is a main railway station in Sirsa district, Haryana, India. Its code is SSA. It serves Sirsa city. The station consists of two platforms. It lies on Hisar–Bathinda line.

== Trains ==
Trains originate/terminate at Sirsa are:

- 14085/14086 Sirsa Express
- 04573 Sirsa–Ludhiana Passenger

Major train from Sirsa

- 14519/14520 Kisan Express
- 19611/19612 Ajmer–Amritsar Express
- 12555/12556 Gorakhdam Superfast Express
- 14620/14619 Tripura Sundari Express
- 14733/14734 Jaipur - Bathinda/ Bathinda - Jaipur Express
