= Mahajan railway station =

Railway station in Rajasthan, India

Mahajan

General information
- Location: Mahajan, Bikaner district, Rajasthan; India
- Coordinates: 28.793007°N 73.853666°E
- Elevation: 198 metres (650 ft)
- System: Indian Railways station
- Owner: Indian Railways
- Operator: North Western Railway
- Line: Jodhpur–Bathinda line
- Platforms: 2
- Tracks: Single Electric-Line

Construction
- Structure type: Standard (on-ground station)

Other information
- Status: Functioning
- Station code: MHJ
- Zone(s): North Western Railway
- Division(s): Bikaner

Services
Preceding station	Indian Railways	Following station
Malkisar towards ?	North Western Railway zone Jodhpur–Bathinda line	Arjansar towards ?
Location
- Interactive map

Mahajan railway station is a railway station located on the Jodhpur–Bathinda railway line operated by the North Western Railway zone under Bikaner railway division. It is situated at Mahajan in Bikaner district in the Indian state of Rajasthan.
