= Dhauladhar Express =

Train in India

Overview
- Service type: Express
- First service: 25 December 2002; 23 years ago
- Current operator: Northern Railway

Route
- Termini: Delhi Sarai Rohilla (DEE); Pathankot Junction (PTK)
- Stops: 17
- Distance travelled: 496 km (308 mi)
- Average journey time: 8 hrs 50 mins
- Service frequency: Tri-weekly. (Note: Runs three days in a week for every direction.)
- Train number: 14035 / 14036

On-board services
- Classes: AC First Class, AC 2 Tier, AC 3 Tier, Sleeper Class, General Unreserved
- Seating arrangements: No
- Sleeping arrangements: Yes
- Catering facilities: Not available
- Observation facilities: Large windows
- Baggage facilities: No
- Other facilities: Below the seats

Technical
- Rolling stock: ICF coach
- Track gauge: 1,676 mm (5 ft 6 in)
- Operating speed: 56 km/h (35 mph) average including halts.

The 14035 / 14036 Dhauladhar Express is an express train belonging to Northern Railway zone that runs between Delhi Sarai Rohilla and Pathankot Junction in India. It is currently being operated with 14035/14036 train numbers on tri-weekly basis.

== Service ==
The 14035/Dhauladhar Express has an average speed of 52 km/h and covers 496 km in 9h 35m. The 14036/Dhauladhar Express has an average speed of 45 km/h and covers 496 km in 11h 5m.

== Route and halts ==
The important halts of the train are:

- Delhi Sarai Rohilla
- Delhi Junction
- Delhi Kishanganj
- Shakurbasti
- Rohtak Junction
- Jind Junction
- Sangrur
- Dhuri Junction
- Ludhiana Junction
- Jalandhar Cantonment Junction
- Dasuya
- Pathankot Junction

== Coach composition ==
The train has standard ICF rakes with maximum speed of 110 kmph. The train consists of 20 coaches:

- 1 First AC cum AC-2 Tier
- 1 AC-2 cum AC-3 Tier
- 3 AC-3 Tier
- 9 Sleeper
- 4 General Unreserved
- 2 Seating cum Luggage Rake

== Traction ==
Both trains are hauled by a Ghaziabad Loco Shed-based WAP-5 / WAP-7 electric locomotive from Delhi Sarai Rohilla to Pathankot and vice versa.

== See also ==
- Old Delhi railway station
- Pathankot Junction railway station
- Delhi–Pathankot Superfast Express
