= Rajiyasar railway station =

Railway station in Rajasthan, India

Rajiyasar

General information
- Location: Maler, Suratgarh Tehsil, Sri Ganganagar district, Rajasthan; India
- Coordinates: 29.067493°N 73.842164°E
- Elevation: 194 metres (636 ft)
- System: Indian Railways station
- Owner: Indian Railways
- Operator: North Western Railway
- Line: Jodhpur–Bathinda line
- Platforms: 1
- Tracks: Single Electric-Line

Construction
- Structure type: Standard (on-ground station)

Other information
- Status: Functioning
- Station code: RJS
- Zone(s): North Western Railway
- Division(s): Bikaner

Services
Preceding station	Indian Railways	Following station
Arjansar towards ?	North Western Railway zone Jodhpur–Bathinda line	Biradhwal towards ?
Location
- Interactive map

Rajiyasar railway station is a railway station located on the Jodhpur–Bathinda railway line operated by the North Western Railway zone under Bikaner railway division. It is situated at Maler, Suratgarh Tehsil in Sri Ganganagar district in the Indian state of Rajasthan.
