= Kisan Express =

Train in India

Overview
- Service type: Express
- Locale: Delhi, Haryana & Punjab
- Current operator: North Western Railway

Route
- Termini: Old Delhi (DLI); Bathinda Junction (BTI)
- Stops: 17
- Distance travelled: 337 km (209 mi)
- Average journey time: 7 hrs 25 mins
- Service frequency: Daily
- Train number: 14731 / 14732

On-board services
- Classes: AC Chair Car, Chair Car, General Unreserved
- Seating arrangements: Yes
- Sleeping arrangements: No
- Auto-rack arrangements: Overhead racks
- Catering facilities: On-board catering, E-catering
- Observation facilities: Large windows
- Baggage facilities: No
- Other facilities: Below the seats

Technical
- Rolling stock: LHB coach
- Track gauge: 1,676 mm (5 ft 6 in)
- Operating speed: 46 km/h (29 mph) average including halts.
Route map
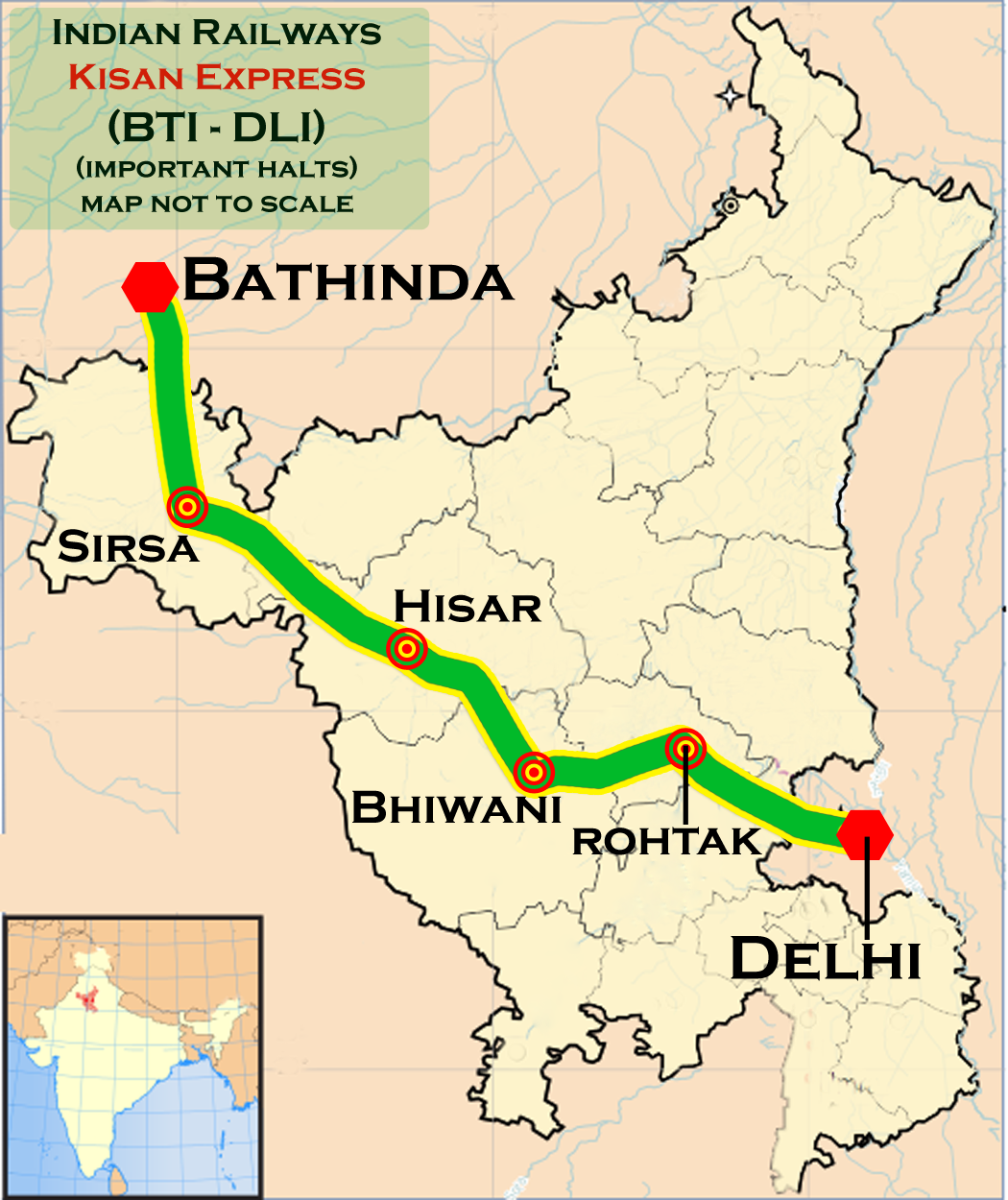

The 14731 / 14732 Kisan Express is an express train belonging to North Western Railway zone that runs between Old Delhi and Bathinda Junction in India. It is currently being operated with 04732 train numbers on a daily basis.

== Service ==
The 14731/Kisan Express has an average speed of 47 km/h and covers 337 km in 7h 10 m. (-without halt time 56 km/h) The 14732/Kisan Express has an average speed of 46 km/h and covers 337 km in 7h 20 m.

== Schedule ==
Train number	Station code	Departure station	Departure time	Departure day	Arrival station	Arrival time	Arrival day
14731	DLI	Old Delhi	2:00 pm	Daily	Bathinda Junction	09:15 pm	Same day
14732	BTI	Bathinda Junction	05:00 am	Daily	Old Delhi	12:30 pm	Same day

== Route and halts ==
The important halts of the train are:

- Old Delhi
- Shakurbasti
- Rohtak Junction
- Bhiwani Junction
- Hisar Junction
- Sirsa
- Bathinda Junction

== Coach composition ==
The train has standard LHB rakes with max speed of 130 kmph. The train consists of 14 coaches:

- 1 AC chair car
- 4 chair cars
- 7 7eneral
- 2 seating cum luggage rake

== Traction ==
It is hauled by a Ghaziabad Loco Shed-based WAP-5 electric locomotive from Bathinda to Old Delhi.

== Direction reversal ==
The train reverses its direction 1 time:

- Bhiwani Junction

== See also ==
- Bathinda Junction railway station
- Old Delhi railway station
- Sirsa Express
