= Jakhal Junction railway station =

Railway Station in Haryana, India

Jakhal Junction
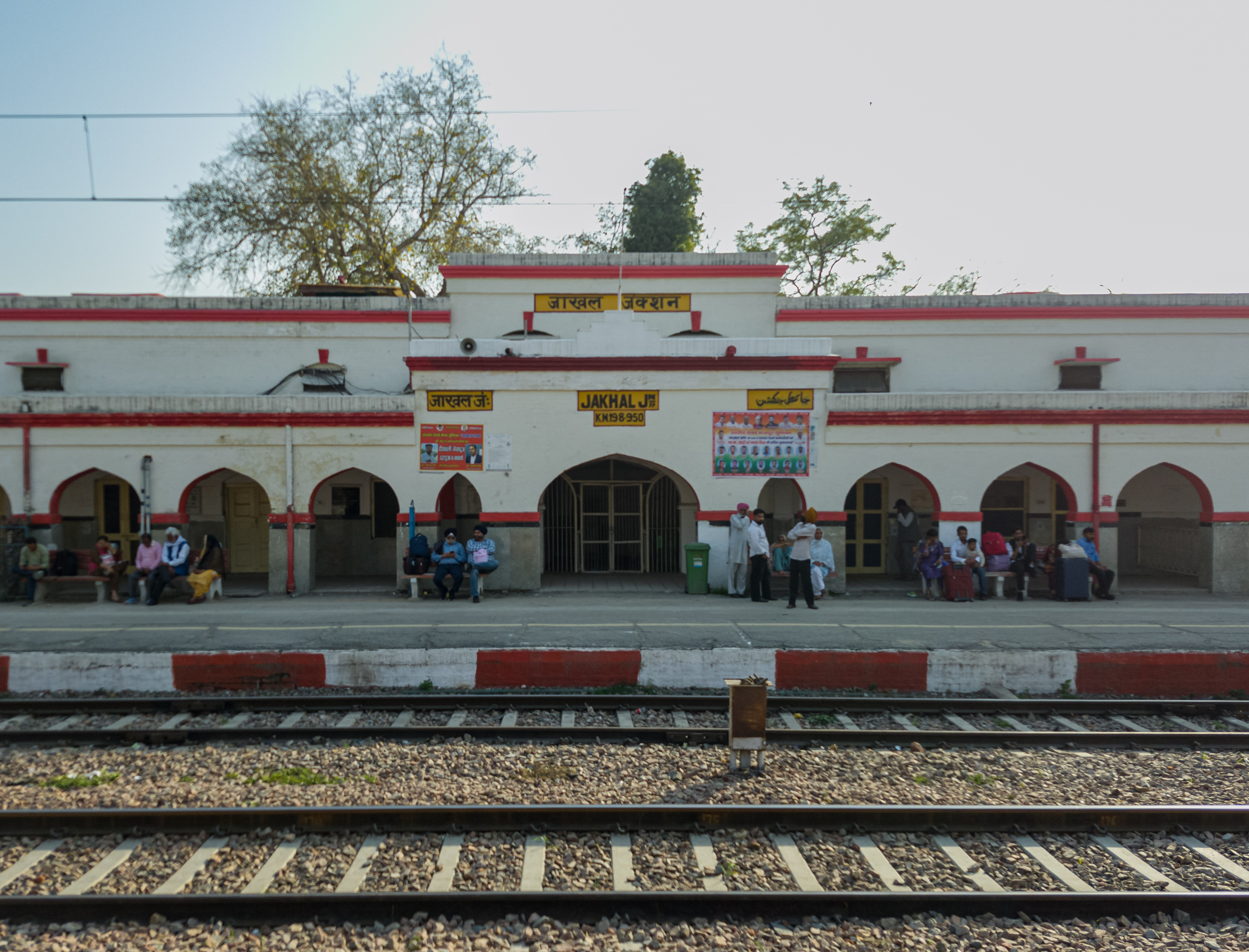
- Jakhal Junction Railway Station

General information
- Location: MD 102, Jakhal, Haryana; India
- Coordinates: 29°48′07″N 75°49′28″E
- Elevation: 225 metres (738 ft)
- System: Indian Railways junction station
- Owner: Ministry of Railways (India)
- Operator: Indian Railways
- Lines: Delhi–Fazilka line Ludhiana–Jakhal line
- Tracks: 5 ft 6 in (1,676 mm) broad gauge

Construction
- Structure type: At grade
- Parking: Yes
- Cycle facilities: No

Other information
- Status: Functioning
- Station code: JHL
- Zone(s): Northern Railway
- Division(s): Delhi

History
- Opened: 1897

Services
| Preceding station | Indian Railways | Following station |
|---|---|---|
| Himmatpura towards ? | Northern Railway zone Delhi–Jakhal -Fazilka line | Kangangarh towards ? |
| Gurnay towards ? | Northern Railway zone Ludhiana–Jakhal Hisar line | Kudani towards ? |
Location
- Location within Haryana

Jakhal railway station is located in Fatehabad district in the Indian state of Haryana and serves Jakhal Mandi.

== Railway station ==
Jakhal railway station is at an elevation of 225 metres (738 ft) and has the assigned code – JHL. Jakhal railway station is operated by Northern Railway zone and lies under Delhi railway division. The railway station consists of 3 platforms. A total of 98 trains halt at Jakhal railway station.

== History ==
The Southern Punjab Railway Co. opened the Delhi–Bhatinda–Samasatta line in 1897. The line passed through Muktasar and Fazilka tehsils and provided direct connections through Samma Satta (now in Pakistan) to Karachi.

The Ludhiana–Jakhal line was laid in 1901, possibly by the Southern Punjab Railway Co.

Jakhal–Hisar line, on to Hisar–Sadalpur line, passes through this station.

== Electrification ==
The electrification of the Rohtak–Bathinda–Lehra Muhabat sector was completed in 2018–19.

Electrification of the Hisar–Jakhal–Ludhiana line was initiated in 2016, in which the Hisar–Jakhal section was completed in 2018 and the rest is expected to be completed in 2019.

== Tracks ==
Delhi–Jakhal–Bhatinda is double electric line.

== Gallery ==
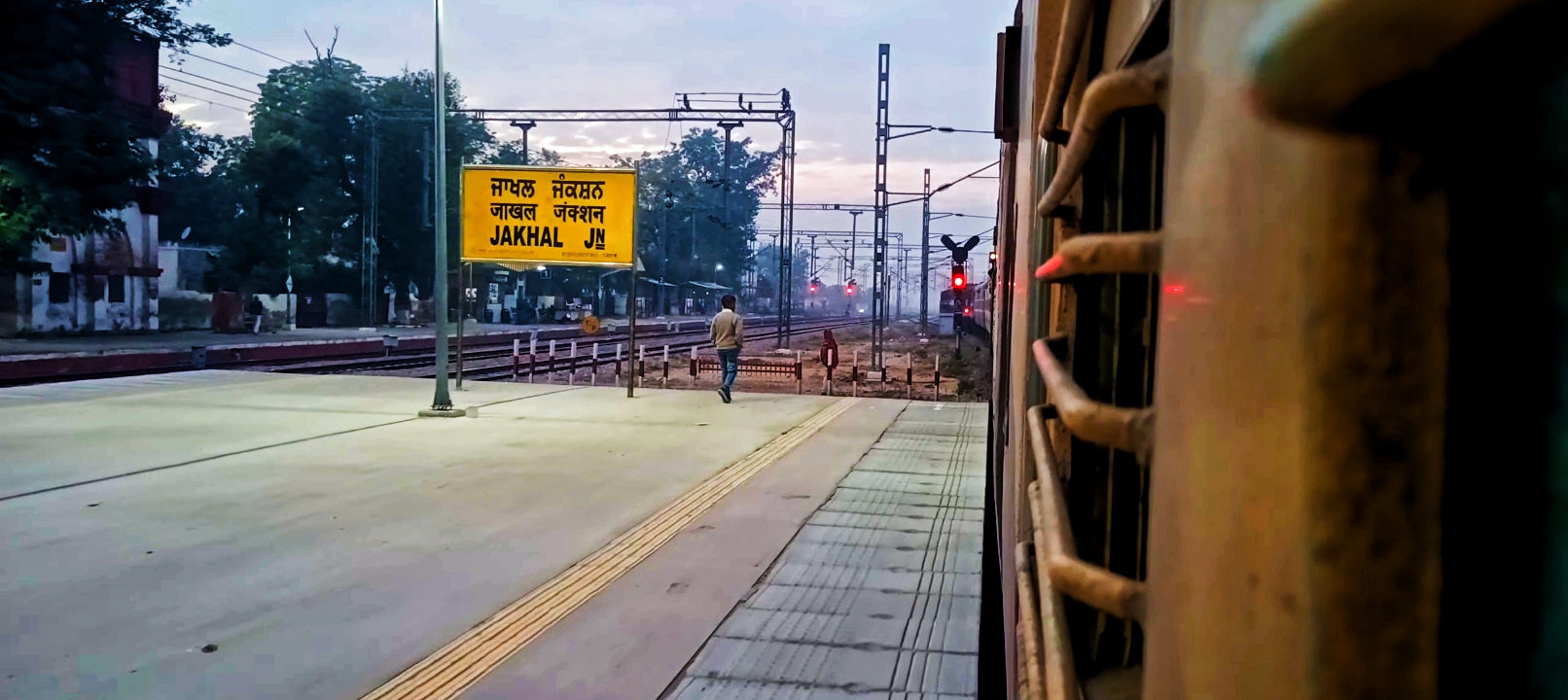
view from Train
