= Arjansar railway station =

Railway station in Rajasthan, India

Arjansar

General information
- Location: Arjansar, Bikaner district, Rajasthan; India
- Coordinates: 28.933796°N 73.871969°E
- Elevation: 199 metres (653 ft)
- System: Indian Railways station
- Owner: Indian Railways
- Operator: North Western Railway
- Line: Jodhpur–Bathinda line
- Platforms: 1
- Tracks: Single Electric-Line

Construction
- Structure type: Standard (on-ground station)

Other information
- Status: Functioning
- Station code: AS
- Zone(s): North Western Railway
- Division(s): Bikaner

Services
| Preceding station | Indian Railways | Following station |
|---|---|---|
| Mahajan towards ? | North Western Railway zone Jodhpur–Bathinda line | Rajiyasar towards ? |
Location
- Interactive map

Arjansar railway station is a railway station located on the Jodhpur–Bathinda railway line operated by the North Western Railway zone under Bikaner railway division. It is situated at Arjansar in Bikaner district in the Indian state of Rajasthan.
