= Rajdhani Park metro station =

Metro station in Delhi, India

Rajdhani Park

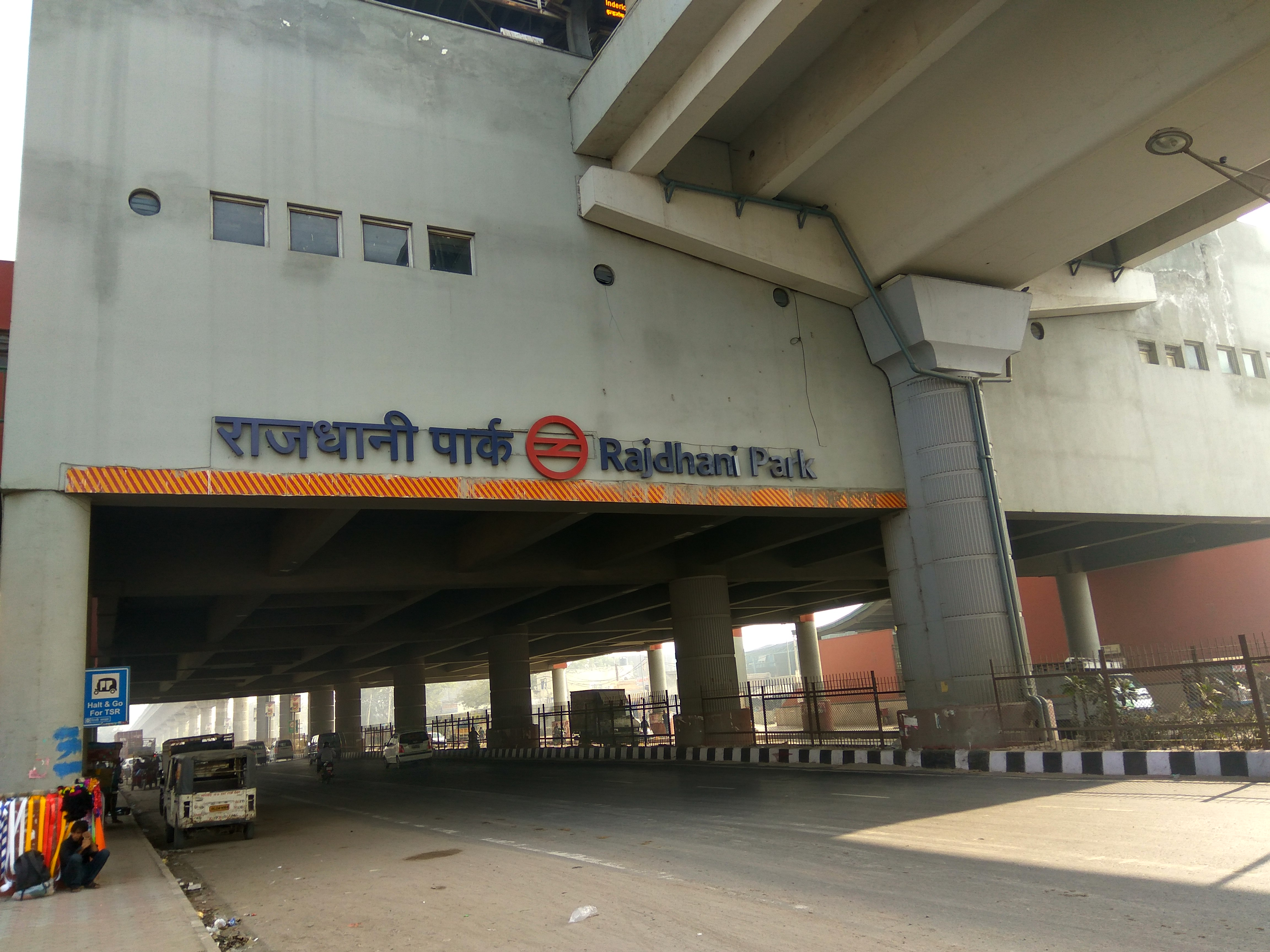

General information
- Location: Rohtak Rd, New Delhi, 110041
- Coordinates: 28°40′56″N 77°02′38″E
- System: Delhi Metro station
- Owner: Delhi Metro Rail Corporation
- Line: Green Line
- Platforms: Side platform; Platform-1 → Brigadier Hoshiyar Singh; Platform-2 → Inderlok / Kirti Nagar
- Tracks: 2

Construction
- Structure type: Elevated
- Platform levels: 2
- Accessible: Yes

Other information
- Station code: RDPK

History
- Opened: 2 April 2010; 16 years ago
- Electrified: 25 kV 50 Hz AC through overhead catenary

Passengers
- Jan 2015: 3,161 /day 97,996/ Month average

Services
| Preceding station | Delhi Metro | Following station |
|---|---|---|
| Mundka towards Brigadier Hoshiyar Singh | Green Line | Nangloi Railway Station towards Inderlok or Kirti Nagar |
Route map
Location

Rajdhani Park is a station on the Green Line of the Delhi Metro and is located in the West Delhi district of Delhi. It is an elevated station and was inaugurated on 2 April 2010.

== Station layout ==
| L2 | Side platform | Doors will open on the left |
| L2 | Platform 2 Eastbound | Towards → Inderlok / Kirti Nagar; Next Station: Nangloi Railway Station |
| L2 | Platform 1 Westbound | Towards ← Brigadier Hoshiyar Singh; Next Station: Mundka |
| L2 | Side platform | Doors will open on the left |
| L1 | Concourse | Fare control, station agent, Metro Card vending machines, crossover |
| G | Street level | Exit/Entrance |

== Facilities ==
List of available ATM at Rajdhani Park metro station are

== Entry/Exit ==
Rajdhani Park metro station Entry/exits
| Gate No-1 | Gate No-2 |
|---|---|
| Shree Shyam Garments And Sons | Shree Shyam Paint And Sanitary |
| The Computer Junction | Sita Ram & Co.PVT Ltd |
| Dada Tekram Marg | Planet Telecom |
| | Assam Timber Market |

== Gallery ==
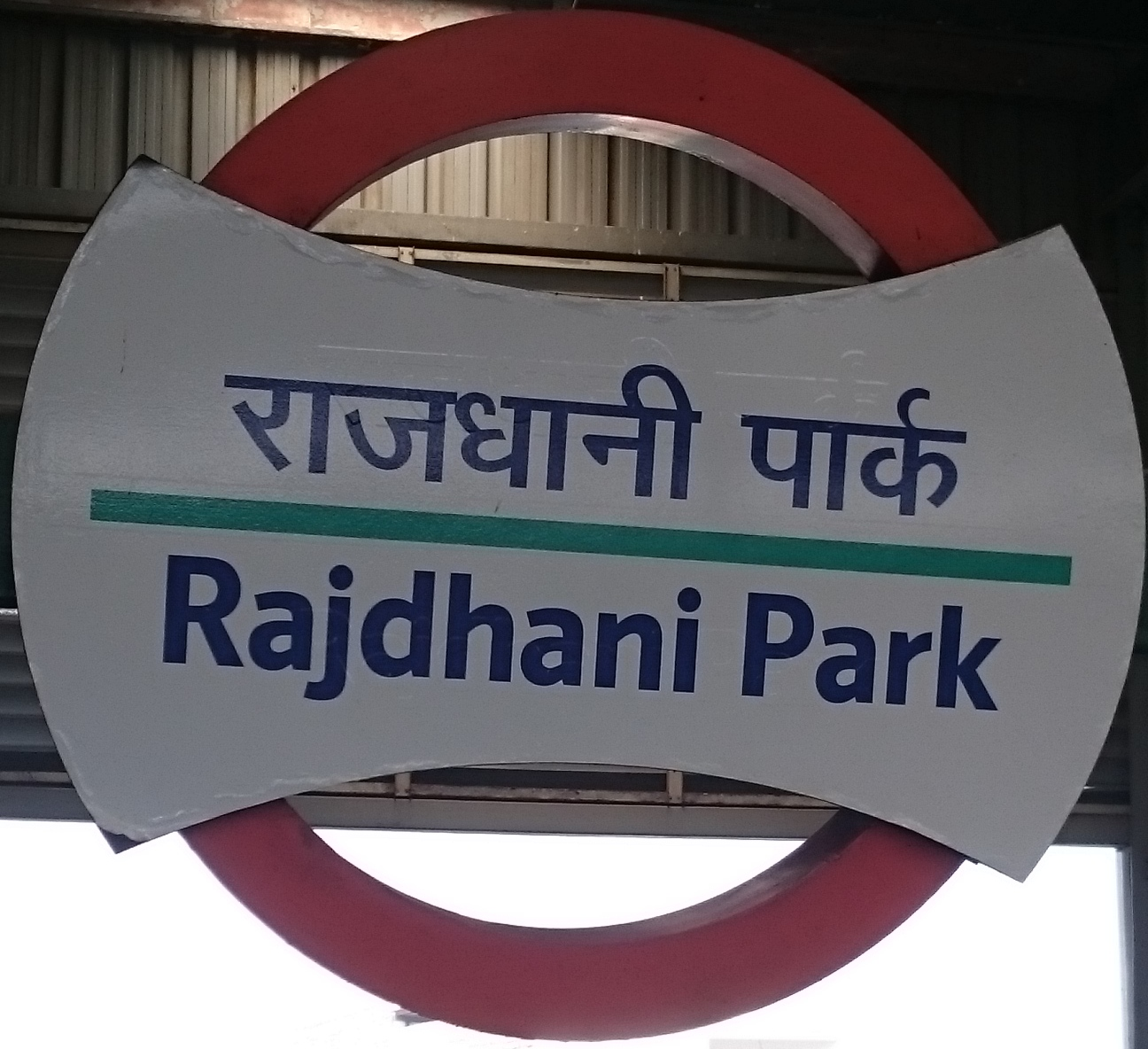

== See also ==
- List of Delhi Metro stations
- Transport in Delhi
- Delhi Metro Rail Corporation
- Delhi Suburban Railway
- List of rapid transit systems in India
