= Bareilly–New Delhi Intercity Express =

Train in India

Kasganj New Delhi Intercity Express
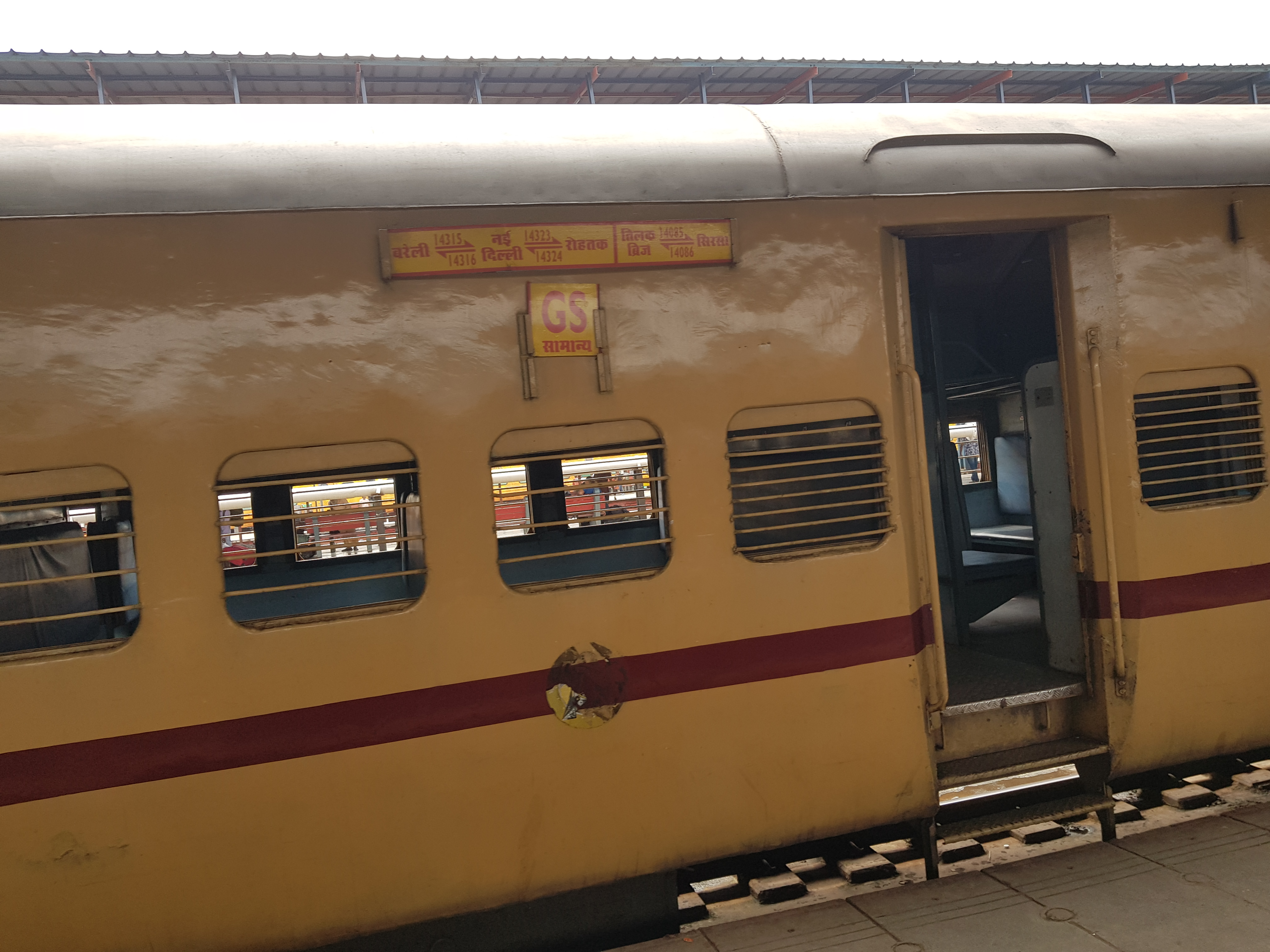
- 15304 New Delhi-Kasganj Intercity Express standing in New Delhi.

Overview
- Service type: Express
- Current operator: Northern Railways

Route
- Termini: Bareilly; New Delhi
- Stops: 18
- Distance travelled: 359 km (223 mi)
- Average journey time: 7 hours 30 mins in both directions
- Service frequency: Daily
- Train number: 15303 / 04

On-board services
- Classes: AC Chair Car, Second Class seating, General Unreserved
- Seating arrangements: Yes
- Sleeping arrangements: No
- Catering facilities: No
- Observation facilities: Rake Sharing with 14323 / 14324 New Delhi–Rohtak Intercity Express

Technical
- Rolling stock: Standard Indian Railways coaches
- Track gauge: 1,676 mm (5 ft 6 in)
- Operating speed: 110 km/h (68 mph) maximum 49.14 km/h (31 mph) in both directions including halts.

The 15303 / 04 Kasganj New Delhi Intercity Express is an Express train belonging to Indian Railways – Northern Railway zone that runs between Kasganj and New Delhi in India.

It operates as train number 15303 from Kasganj to New Delhi and as train number 15304 in the reverse direction serving the states of Uttar Pradesh and Delhi.

== Coaches ==
The 14315 / 16 Bareilly New Delhi Intercity Express has 2 AC Chair Car, 9 Second Class seating, 7 General Unreserved and 2 SLR (Seating cum Luggage Rake) Coaches. It does not carry a Pantry car coach.

As is customary with most train services in India, Coach Composition may be amended at the discretion of Indian Railways depending on demand.

== Service ==
14315 / 16 Bareilly New Delhi Intercity Express covers the distance of 258 kilometres (160 mi) in 5 hours 15 mins (49.14 km/h).

As the average speed of the train is below 55 km/h (34 mph), as per Indian Railways rules, its fare does not include a Superfast surcharge.

== Routeing ==
The 14315 / 16 Bareilly New Delhi Intercity Express runs from Bareilly via Rampur, Moradabad junction, Gajraula Junction, Hapur, Ghaziabad, Anand Vihar Terminal to New Delhi.

== Traction ==
As the track between these cities is totally electrified, a Ghaziabad and Izzatnagar based WAP 4 or WAP 5 locomotive powers the train for its entire journey.
