= Nangloi Railway Station metro station =

Metro station in Delhi, India

Nangloi Railway Station

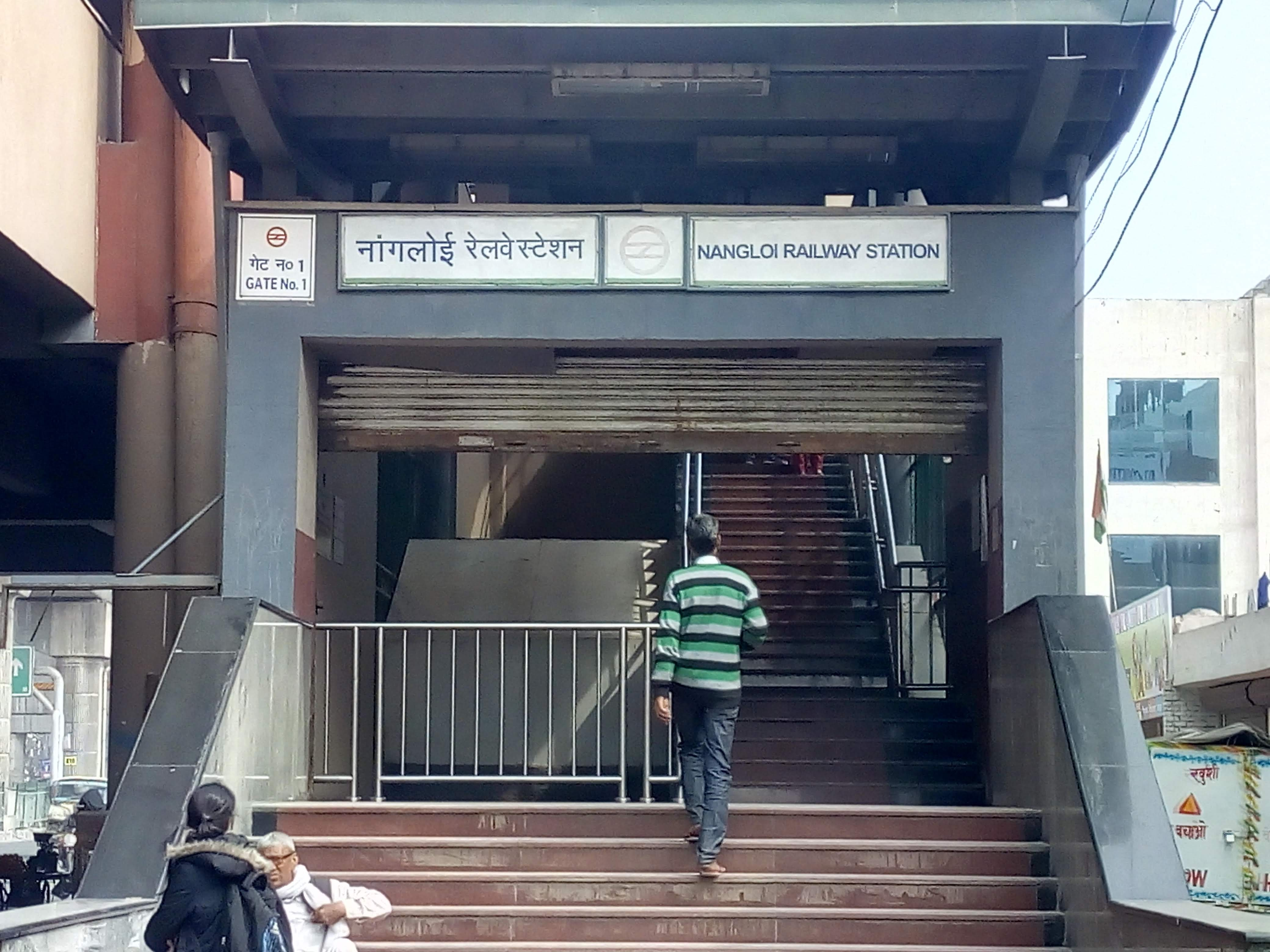

General information
- Location: Rohtak Rd, Tyagi Colony, Nangloi Extension, Nangloi, New Delhi,110041
- Coordinates: 28°40′56″N 77°03′22″E
- System: Delhi Metro station
- Owner: Delhi Metro Rail Corporation
- Line: Green Line
- Platforms: Side platform; Platform-1 → Brigadier Hoshiyar Singh; Platform-2 → Inderlok / Kirti Nagar
- Tracks: 2
- Connections: Nangloi

Construction
- Structure type: Elevated
- Platform levels: 2
- Accessible: Yes

Other information
- Station code: NRSN

History
- Opened: 2 April 2010; 16 years ago
- Electrified: 25 kV 50 Hz AC through overhead catenary

Passengers
- Jan 2015: 6,578 /day 203,916/ Month average

Services
Preceding station	Delhi Metro	Following station
Rajdhani Park towards Brigadier Hoshiyar Singh	Green Line	Nangloi towards Inderlok or Kirti Nagar
Route map
Location

Nangloi Railway Station is an elevated metro station on the Green Line of the Delhi Metro, located in Nangloi, West Delhi. It commenced operations on 2 April 2010 as part of the Inderlok–Mundka corridor. The station provides access to Nangloi railway station (station code NNO), which is operated by the Northern Railway's Delhi Division.

== Station layout ==
L2	Side platform | Doors will open on the left
L2	Platform 2 Eastbound	Towards → Inderlok / Kirti Nagar; Next Station: Nangloi
L2	Platform 1 Westbound	Towards ← Brigadier Hoshiyar Singh; Next Station: Rajdhani Park
L2	Side platform | Doors will open on the left
L1	Concourse	Fare control, station agent, Metro Card vending machines, crossover
G	Street level	Exit/Entrance

== Facilities ==
List of available ATM at Nangloi railway station metro station are:

== See also ==
- List of Delhi Metro stations
- Transport in Delhi
- Delhi Metro Rail Corporation
- Delhi Suburban Railway
- List of rapid transit systems in India
