= Dhuri Junction railway station =

Railway station in Punjab, India

Dhuri Junction
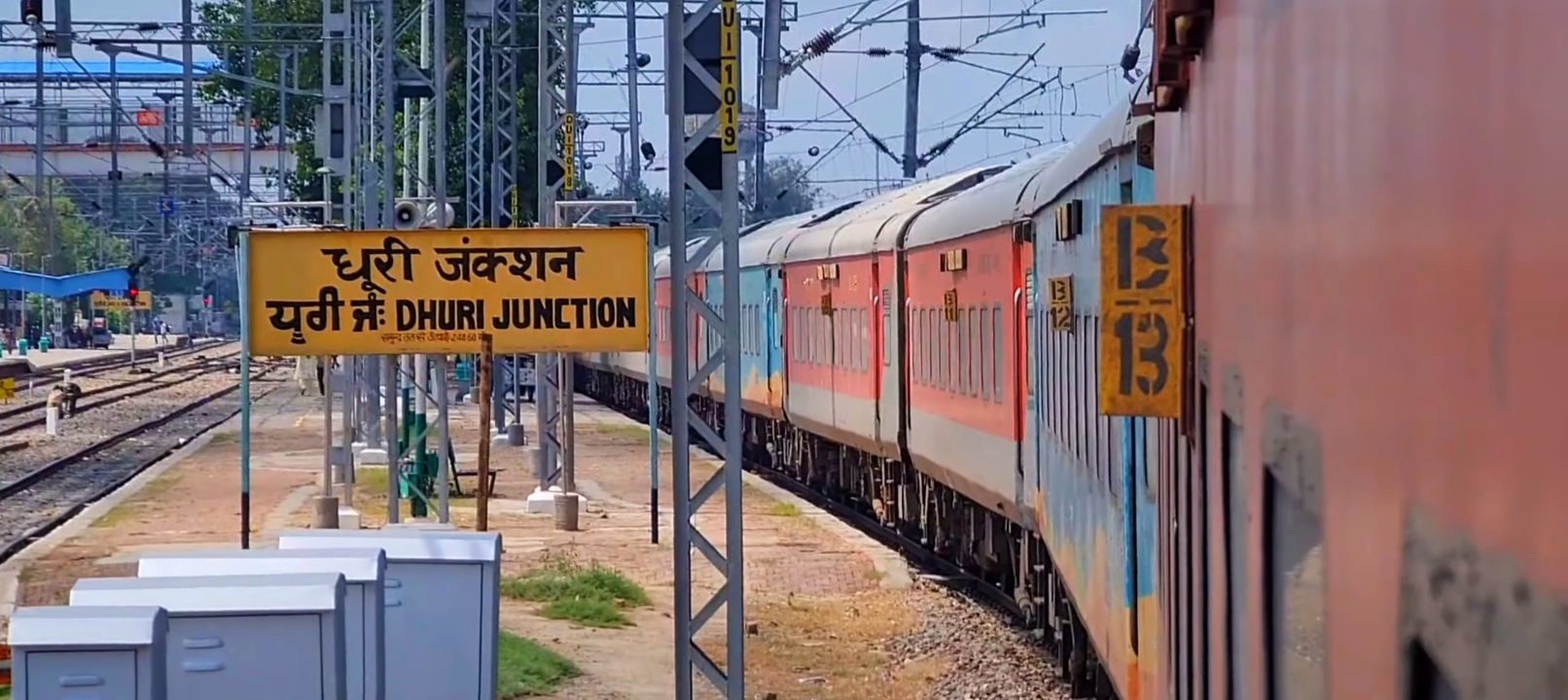
- Dhuri Junction

General information
- Location: Pathsala mohalla, Dhuri, Sangrur district, Punjab; India
- Coordinates: 30.3730°N 75.8663°E
- Elevation: 248 metres (814 ft)
- System: Indian Railways junction station
- Owner: Indian Railways
- Operator: Northern Railways
- Lines: Bathinda–Rajpura line Ludhiana–Jakhal line
- Platforms: 5
- Tracks: 4

Construction
- Structure type: At-grade
- Parking: Yes
- Cycle facilities: No

Other information
- Status: Functioning
- Station code: DUI
- Zone(s): Northern Railway zone
- Division(s): Ambala

History
- Opened: 1905
Location
- Location within Punjab Location within India

Dhuri Junction Railway Station is located in Sangrur district in the state of Punjab in India and serves Dhuri city. Dhuri Junction station falls under Ambala railway division of Northern Railway zone of Indian Railways.

== The railway station ==
Dhuri Junction railway station is located at an elevation of 248 metres (814 ft) and was assigned the station coade DUI. Dhuri station is located on the single track, 5 ft 6 in (1,676 mm) broad gauge Ludhiana–Jakhal line where it was originally built in 1905. Later another Bathinda–Rajpura line was added passing through Dhuri creating a junction station. It is well connected to a number of major cities.

== Electrification ==
Dhuri Junction railway station has electrified lines. Electrification of the Ludhiana to Dhuri line was completed in 2019. The electrification of 62 km long stretch of Dhuri(Punjab)–Jakhal(Haryana) on Ludhiana–Jakhal line was completed and trial runs were successfully carried out in July 2020. The 68 km long stretch from Dhuri station to Lehra Muhabbat station on Bathinda–Rajpura line was also completed in July 2020.

== Amenities ==
Dhuri Junction railway station has all basic amenities like drinking water with water cooler, public toilets above prescribed norms, retiring room, sheltered area with adequate seating, telephone booth and an ATM. There is one foot overbridge connecting platforms.
