= Saraswati Vihar =

- District Subdivision
- Location in Delhi, India
- Coordinates: 28.6966°N 77.1271°E
- Country: India
- State: Delhi
- District: North West Delhi

Government
  - Body: Municipal Corporation Of Delhi

Languages
  - Official: Hindi, English
- Time zone: UTC+5:30 (IST)
- Lok Sabha constituency: chandni chowk
- Vidhan Sabha constituency: Shakur basti
- Civic agency: Municipal Corporation Of Delhi

Saraswati Vihar is an upscale residential area in North West Delhi in Pitampura. Saraswati Vihar is also one of the three administrative divisions of the North West Delhi district.

== Etymology ==
Saraswati is the Hindu goddess of learning and knowledge. Vihar is the Sanskrit word for dwelling. "Saraswati Vihar" literally means Saraswati's abode. This residential neighbourhood was created as a group housing society of school teachers in the 1970s. Teachers are the repository of knowledge and sources of learning. Hence the name.

== History ==
Govt notified agricultural land of various villages such as Madi Pur, Shakur Pur, Mangol Pur Kalan, Pitampura etc in 1961 and acquired on different dates. Govt( Delhi Administration) allotted some of the land of village Salim Pur Mazra Madi Pur ( Be Chirag Mauza ) to the government teachers'cooprative house building society. The land was far away from Delhi city as it existed then and initially rural area The area was developed and construction of houses by members of society was started before 1975.

The layout of the entire housing society was well-designed with green parks, open spaces, schools, sweet shop and commercial centre. The teachers built their houses on the plots of land leased to them, generally by taking loans from the government or banks. By 1982, a healthy percentage of residents started settling in. During those days, there was a scarcity of water and people used to get water from the nearby Rani Bagh market.

Later the lease was converted into ownership. The plot sizes were about 140 to 330 square metres. Some next-generation heirs of the teachers have sold the houses as the prices have increased about five thousand times. For example, a 200 square metre plot of land originally purchased in 1975 for about Rs.16,000 now sells for about Rs.100 to 120 million. Originally only two storeys were allowed to be built on about two-thirds area of the plot. Now five floors can be built on about 90% area of the plot. Real estate prices have skyrocketed over the years due to this and other reasons.

Some persons who were not teachers or are not heirs of teachers have purchased some houses or floors here and live here. The number of original allottees selling off their land or getting their houses redeveloped by real estate builders in exchange for newly built floors and some cash is increasing.

== Overview ==
Saraswati Vihar has 1,095 houses ranging from 140 m^{2} (1,510 sq ft) to 330 m^{2} (3,550 sq ft). They have been divided into five blocks from A to E. Each block has a dedicated and well maintained lush green park. A green belt spanning over 1.5 km goes through Saraswati Vihar which make it one of the posh colonies of Delhi. The area has a dedicated electricity supply facility situated in D Block, a bus station situated in C Block and a police post in A Block. Surprisingly, Rani Bagh Police Station is located in Saraswati Vihar but in a nearby area of Rani Bagh.

Saraswati Vihar has a library, medical facilities, post office, banks, shops, health clubs and schools. Saraswati Vihar has one government primary school and two government senior secondary schools. It has three markets (one each in A, C and E blocks). This locality has a clean and green environment and a lot of open spaces. Most of the residents are learned people. Roads and parks are well maintained.

== Accessibility ==
Saraswati Vihar is adjacent to the outer ring road from Deepali Chowk to Madhuban Chowk with Rohini on the other side of the outer ring road. Pitampura and Kohat Enclave Metro Station of the Delhi Metro are nearby.
