= Lunkaransar railway station =

Railway station in Rajasthan, India

Lunkaransar

General information
- Location: Lunkaransar, Bikaner district, Rajasthan; India
- Coordinates: 28.493089°N 73.743040°E
- Elevation: 193 metres (633 ft)
- System: Indian Railways station
- Owner: Indian Railways
- Operator: North Western Railway
- Line: Surtgarh–Bikaner line
- Platforms: 2
- Tracks: 1

Construction
- Structure type: Standard (on ground station)
- Parking: Yes

Other information
- Status: Functioning
- Station code: LKS
- Zone(s): North Western Railway
- Division(s): Bikaner
Location
- Location within India Location within Rajasthan

Lunkaransar railway station, with the code LKS, is located in Bikaner district, Rajasthan and serves the town of Lunkaransar. The station features a single platform, and various types of trains, including Passenger, Express, and Superfast trains, stop there.

== Trains ==
The following trains halt at Lunkaransar railway station in both directions:

- Ahmedabad–Jammu Tawi Express
- Avadh Assam Express
- Kota–Shri Ganganagar Superfast Express
- Kalka–Barmer Express
- Bikaner–Delhi Sarai Rohilla Superfast Express
- BGKT-JAT express
- jodhpur-bhatinda express
- Suratgarh -jaipur express
- Dadar-HMH Rankapur express
- SGNR-PURI WEEKLY EXP
- SGNR -DADAR WESTERN BIWEEKLY
- BKN-AMRITSAR WEEKLY
- LALGARH BATHINDA PASSENGER
