= Rani Bagh, Delhi =

Rani Bagh Rani Bagh
- Neighborhood of Delhi
- Location in Delhi, India
- Coordinates: 28.6879°N 77.1342°E
- Country: India
- Union Territory: Delhi
- District: North West Delhi
- Metro: Shakurpur metro station
- Lok Sabha constituency: Chandni Chowk
- Vidhan Sabha constituency: Shakur Basti
- Time zone: UTC+5:30 (IST)
- PIN: 110034
- Civic agency: Municipal Corporation Of Delhi (MCD)

Rani Bagh is a residential area located near Shakur Basti in North West Delhi district in NCT of Delhi, India. Connected to Saraswati Vihar, Engineer's enclave, Shakur Basti, Raja Park, Lok Vihar, Sant Nagar (Rani Bagh) and Pitampura. It connects to various parts of Delhi and to both the inner and outer ring roads. It's an urban area where you will find Rani Bagh Market, commercial complexes, shopping malls nearby like Aggarwal City Mall, Chunmun, Reliance and restaurants such as Domino's, BTW and many more.

== Subdivisions ==
The various neighborhoods included inside Rani Bagh are Mahindra Park, Multani Mohalla, Raja Park, Saraswati Vihar and Rishi Nagar. It is located near the Rohini zone and famous for its Rani-Bagh market. Metro feeder bus facilities connects with Pitampura, Netaji Subhash Palace and Kirti Nagar Metro Stations.
