= New Delhi–Rohtak Intercity Express =

New Delhi – Rohtak Junction Intercity Express
Overview
- Service type: Express
- First service: 9 August 2013; 12 years ago
- Current operator: Northern Railway zone

Route
- Termini: New Delhi; Rohtak Junction
- Stops: 26
- Distance travelled: 71.1 km (44 mi)
- Average journey time: 2 hours 02 mins
- Service frequency: Daily
- Train number: 14323 / 14324

On-board services
- Classes: AC Chair car, general unreserved, Chair car
- Seating arrangements: Yes
- Sleeping arrangements: No
- Catering facilities: No
- Observation facilities: Rake Sharing with 14315 / 14316 Bareilly New Delhi Intercity Express

Technical
- Rolling stock: Standard Indian Railways Coaches
- Track gauge: 1,676 mm (5 ft 6 in)
- Operating speed: 35.5 km/h (22 mph)

The 14323 / 24 New Delhi – Rohtak Junction Intercity Express is an Express train belonging to Indian Railways Northern Railway zone that runs between New Delhi and Rohtak Junction in India.

It operates as train number 14323 from New Delhi to Rohtak Junction and as train number 14324 in the reverse direction serving the states of Haryana & Delhi.

== Coaches ==
The 14323 / 24 New Delhi – Rohtak Junction Intercity Express has two AC Chair Car, nine chair car, seven general unreserved & two SLR (seating with luggage rake) coaches . It does not carry a pantry car coach.

As is customary with most train services in India, coach composition may be amended at the discretion of Indian Railways depending on demand.

== Service ==
The 14323 New Delhi – Rohtak Junction Intercity Express covers the distance of 71.1 km (44 mi) in 2 hours 20 mins (30 km/h) and in 1 hours 45 mins as the 14324 Rohtak Junction – New Delhi Intercity Express (41 km/h).

As the average speed of the train is less than 55 km/h (34 mph), as per railway rules, its fare doesn't includes a Superfast surcharge.

== Routing ==
The 14323 / 24 New Delhi – Rohtak Junction Intercity Express runs from New Delhi via Shakur Basti, Bahadurgarh to Rohtak Junction.

== Traction ==
As the route is going to be electrified, a Izzatnagar based WDM-3A diesel locomotive pulls the train to its destination.
