= Ludhiana–Jakhal line =

Railway line

Ludhiana–Dhuri–Jakhal line
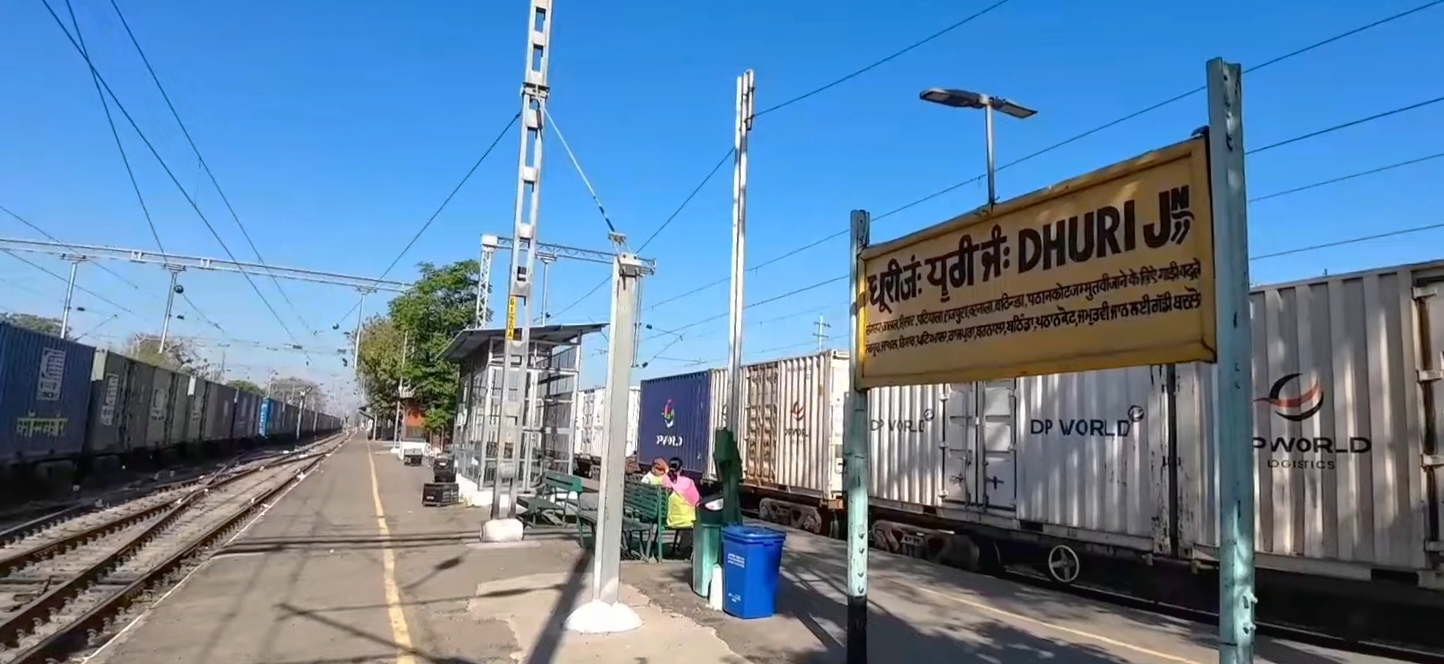
- Dhuri Junction railway stationis an important railway station on Ludhiana-Jakhal line

Overview
- Status: Operational
- Owner: Indian Railways
- Locale: Punjab
- Termini: Ludhiana; Jakhal

Service
- System: Electrified
- Operator(s): Northern Railway

History
- Opened: 1901

Technical
- Track length: 129 km (80 mi)
- Number of tracks: 1 (single)
- Track gauge: 5 ft 6 in (1,676 mm) broad gauge
- Electrification: Yes
- Operating speed: 110 km/h (68 mph)
- Highest elevation: Ludhiana 248 m (814 ft), Jakhal 225 m (738 ft)

The Ludhiana–Dhuri–Jakhal line is a railway line connecting Ludhiana in the Indian state of the Punjab and Jakhal in Haryana. The line is under the administrative jurisdiction of Northern Railway.

== History ==
In 1893, an agreement for the construction, working and maintenance of the broad-gauge Ludhiana–Dhuri–Jakhal railway line, via Sangrur, was signed between the British Raj and the native principalities of Jind State, Malerkotla State and Patiala State, since the line was situated partly in British territory and partly in the territory lying in the native principalities. in 1901, this new line was commissioned, possibly by the Southern Punjab Railway Co.

It was later extended to Hisar Junction.

== Electrification ==
The electrification of the Jakhal–Ludhiana line was sanctioned in 2013, with construction commencing from the Ludhiana end in March 2016, and the foundation stone being laid at Gill. Successful CRS trials were conducted up to Dhuri Junction from Ludhiana Junction in 2019. The electrification of 62 km-long stretch of Dhuri to Jakhal on Ludhiana–Jakhal line was completed and trial runs were successfully carried out in July 2020.

== Tracks ==
Detailed survey for the doubling of the Ludhiana–Sangrur–Jakhal line has been ordered.

== Railway reorganisation ==
Southern Punjab Railway was taken over by the state and merged with North Western Railway in 1930.

With the partition of India in 1947, North Western Railway was split. While the western portion became Pakistan West Railway, and later Pakistan Railways, the eastern part became Eastern Punjab Railway.

In 1952, Northern Railway was formed with a portion of East Indian Railway Company, west of Mughalsarai, Bikaner Railway and Eastern Punjab Railway.
