= Lalgarh, Rajasthan =

Lalgarh Kaniyana
- town
- Location in Rajasthan, India Lalgarh (India)
- Coordinates: 27°31′11″N 73°54′29″E
- Country: India
- State: Rajasthan
- District: Churu
- Named for: Raja Lal Singh

Population (2011)
  - Total: 10,253
  - Density: 9.62/km^{2} (24.9/sq mi)

Languages
  - Official: Hindi
- Time zone: UTC+5:30 (IST)
- PIN: 331518
- 01569: 01569
- ISO 3166 code: RJ-IN
- Vehicle registration: RJ-
- Nearest city: Nagour (42 km approx.)
- Sex ratio: 100/95 ♂/♀
- Literacy: 72%

Lalgarh is a small town in Churu district in Rajasthan, India, situated on the border of the Churu and Nagaur districts. Raja Lal Singh named the village after himself. Previously, it was known as Kaniyana.
