= Hisar Junction railway station =

Railway Station in Haryana, India

Hisar Junction
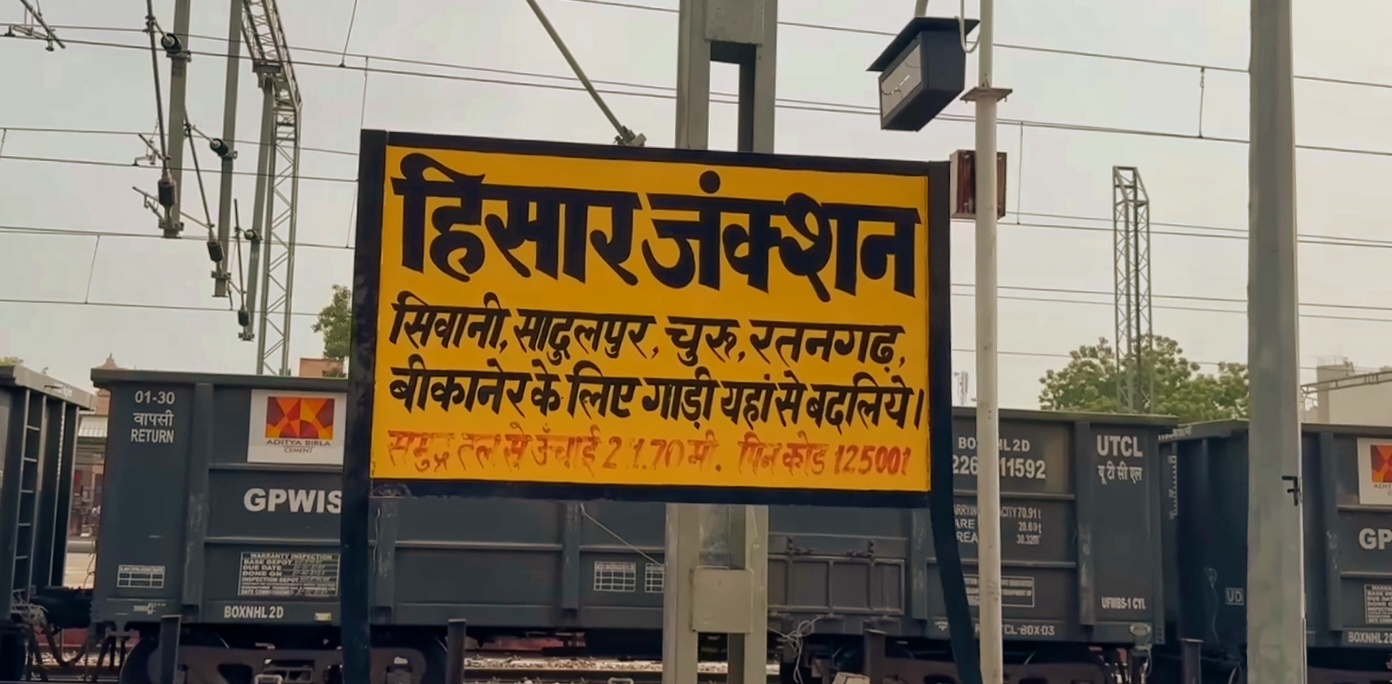
- Hisar Junction Railway Station

General information
- Location: Railway Road, Hisar, Haryana; India
- Coordinates: 29.1519°N 75.7244°E
- Elevation: 212 metres (696 ft)
- System: Express train and Passenger train station
- Owner: Indian Railways
- Lines: Bathinda–Rewari line Ludhiana–Bikaner line
- Platforms: 6
- Tracks: 8
- Connections: Auto rickshaw stand, Rickshaw stand

Construction
- Structure type: At-ground
- Platform levels: 1 (ground level)
- Parking: Yes
- Cycle facilities: Yes
- Architectural style: simple

Other information
- Status: Functioning
- Station code: HSR
- Zone(s): North Western Railway zone
- Division(s): Bikaner
- Fare zone: North Western Railway zone
- Classification: Passenger and freight

History
- Opened: 1873
Location
- Location within Haryana Location within India

Hisar Junction railway station (railway code: HSR) is an A-category railway station, under the Bikaner railway division of North Western Railway zone of Indian Railways, located at Hisar city in Hisar district of Haryana state of India. The station consists of 6 platforms, with 6 broad-gauge mostly electrified tracks of Bathinda–Rewari line and Jakhal–Hisar–Sadalpur line, going in 4 directions at an average speed of 120 km/h. Hisar is one of the 400 stations to be redeveloped with international and private partners for modernization on international standards and optimizing the commercial opportunities. In 2024, the station had 60 passenger and good trains, and 8,000 daily passenger traffic, 2 overhead foot bridges, 2 escalators and one elevator.

== Location ==
The railway station is about 2 km (1.2 mi) from the bus station along the National Highway 9, 6 km (3.7 mi) from the Hisar Airport, 2 km (1.2 mi) from the town centre and main market area, 2 km (1.2 mi) from the Chaudhary Charan Singh Haryana Agricultural University, 5 kilometres (3.1 mi) from the Guru Jambheshwar University of Science and Technology, 7 km (4.3 mi) from the Lala Lajpat Rai University of Veterinary and Animal Sciences, 4 km (2.5 mi)from the Blue Bird Lake, 1 km (0.62 mi) from Mahabir Stadium, 180 km (110 mi) from the New Delhi railway station, 167 km (104 mi) from the Indira Gandhi International Airport, and 235 km (146 mi) from the Chandigarh International Airport. Under the NCR Proposed Transport Plan, a high-speed rail Delhi–Hisar Regional Rapid Transit System (RRTS) link is also planned.

== History ==
As of August 21, 2026, there are four broad-gauge railway lines at the station: Bathinda–Rewari line with Hisar–Bhatina section in the north and Rewari–Hisar section in the south east directions, Jakhal–Hisar line in the north-east and Hisar–Sadalpur line in the south-west direction. The Hisar station itself has 6 platforms and 8 tracks to accommodate trains on these four lines. The railway station is a part of Western Dedicated Rail Freight Corridor, to be developed as an export-oriented industrial unit.

In 1873 during the British Raj, the Rajputana–Malwa Railway extended the 1,000 mm (3 ft 3 3/8 in)-wide metre-gauge Delhi–Rewari line to Hisar, and then to Bhatinda in 1883–84, connecting it all the way to Karachi via Delhi–Karachi line. The metre-gauge Hisar–Sadulpur link was converted to broad gauge in 2009. In 2013, track doubling and electrification of Hisar–Rewari track via Hansi and Bhiwani commenced, which was completed in 2016. In 2017, the Hisar–Bhatinda via Sirsa electrification was under progress.

In 1911–13, the broad-gauge Hisar–Sadalpur line connecting Hisar with Jodhpur–Bathinda line at Sadulpur (Rajgarh) in Rajasthan was built. In 1913, Ludhiana–Jakhal line via Sangrur, built in 1901 (possibly by the Southern Punjab Railway Company) was extended to Hisar, thus forming the Ludhiana–Jakhal–Hisar–Sadalpur link which connected with Jodhpur–Bikaner–Sadalpur–Bathinda line at Sadalpur (Rajgarh) and Delhi–Fazilka line at Jakhal. Earlier in 1983, an agreement for the construction, working and maintenance of the railway line was signed between the British Raj and the native princely states of Jind State, Malerkotla State and Patiala State to construct the broad-gauge Ludhiana–Dhuri–Jakhal line which was situated partly in British territory and partly in the territory lying in these native states. In 2017, Hisar–Ludhiana via Barwala and Jakhal electrification by the Rail Vikas Nigam Limited is already under progress. In 2017, Hisar–Sadalpur and to Bikaner proposal for the track electrification was also approved. After conversion to electric, the trains would move at an average speed of 120 km/h, instead of earlier 70 km/h speed of diesel engines.

In fy 2013–14, a small museum was also set up in the waiting room and Rohtak–Hansi line was approved to complete the direct link from Delhi to Hisar, without the need to undergo the current Hansi–Bhiwani–Hisar detour, the line is under construction with a likely completion date by 2020.

In fy 2014–15, survey work for the new Uklana-Narwana line (29 km) and Hansi–Jind line (45 km) was also announced. In fy 2017–18, the railway minister announced the annual union railway budget allocation to Haryana of INR 1,247 crore (US$200 million), to undertake the new 45 km long Hansi–Jind line at the cost of INR 900 crore (US$140 million) on a 50:50 equity share with the state, INR 25 lakh (US$40,000) for the surveys for new 55 km Jyotisar-Yamunanagar line (via Kurukshetra, Ladwa and Radaur) and for new 65 km Kaithal–Patiala line, installation of two escalators for the busiest platforms, notification of Hisar as one among the 400 stations to be redeveloped with international and private partners for modernization on international standards and optimizing the commercial opportunities, and electrification of the following six existing routes at the cost allocation of INR 511.52 crore (US$85 million) in fy 2017–18: Narwana–Kurukshetra line, Panipat–Jind line, Panipat–Rohtak line, Garhi Harsaru–Farukhnagar line (12 km within Gurgram), Rewari–Rohtak line and Rewri–Sadulpur-Hanumangarh line. In contrast, the average annual union rail budget allocation to Haryana for new works was INR 315 crore (US$47 million) and INR 635 crore (US$95 million) between 2009–10 to 2013–14 and between 2014–15 and 2016–17 respectively.

In fy2018–19 budget on 9 March 2018, Captain Abhimanyu, Finance Minister of Haryana, announced that the government is in talks with Indian railway to introduce 200 km/h speed rail from Hisar to Delhi once the under-construction Rohtak–Hansi rail link is completed.

In 2023, Rohtak–Hansi line was completed and regular scheduled goods train operation had started in December 2023.

In January 2025, Northern Railway Zone was preparing DPR for a 25 km long Satrod-Dabra-Chiraud rail bypass for good trains and doubling of Hisar-Jakhal line. Earlier in 2024, the FSL (Final Location Survey) for these were completed.

== Train service ==
=== Tracks ===
All the tracks from and around Hisar on the following routes have been electrified and converted to the broad gauge.

Indian Railway Line Status
Rail Line Name	Track Doubling Status	OHE Height Raising for Double-Stack Containers
Hisar-Jakhal-Ludhiana	Yes. Hisar-Jakhal completion date of December 31, 2024. The Jakhal-Ludhiana section is already double-tracked. (Status as of April 2021).	Yes. High-rise OHE (7.45m contact wire height) on the Rewari-Hisar-Ludhiana feeder route to the Western DFC.
Hisar-Loharu-Ratangarh-Jodhpur-Bhiladi	Yes (2027). Doubling work is being executed in phases with a target completion date of 21 March 2027. (Status as of April 2023).	Yes. The North Western Railway has undertaken umbrella works to raise the height of road over bridges and other structures to facilitate double-stack container services on this route. (Status as of March 2022).
Churu-Jaipur	The Churu-Ratangarh doubling (completion date of 27 May 2025). (Status as of August 2025).	OHE height raising is implemented as part of a phased, ongoing effort on key freight corridors. (Status as of June 2020).
Hisar-Sirsa-Bathinda	Yes. Bhatinda-Bhildi (completion date of 31 March 2027). The Rajpura-Bathinda section, which connects to this line, has been fully doubled. (Status as of August 2025).	OHE height has been raised on major sections of this line to accommodate double-stack container trains, linking to the wider freight network in the region. (Status as of June 2020).
Hisar-Hansi-Bhiwani-Rewari	Yes/planned (FSL in-progress in early 2026). The new Hansi-Rohtak line is also a double-track project. Bhiwani-Rohtak also doubled. (Status as of July 2025).	Yes. The OHE on this line, particularly on the sections connecting to the Western Dedicated Freight Corridor (WDFC), has been raised for the operation of electric-hauled double-stack container trains. (Status as of January 2024).
Hansi-Rohtak-Bahadurgarh-Delhi	Partial. Rohtak-Bahadurgarh-Delhi is double track, Hansi-Rohtak demanded but no approved doubling project yet. (Status as of April 2025).	Yes. The OHE height has been raised on this critical corridor, as it is a part of the Delhi-Mumbai freight route. The Haryana Orbital Rail Corridor (HORC) is also being constructed to allow for double-decker trains, which require raised OHE. (Status as of July 2025).
Delhi-Rohtak-Jind-Bathinda	Yes. The Delhi-Rohtak section is a double-track line. Doubling of the Rohtak-Jind-Bathinda section is ongoing, with a sanctioned plan for the whole line. The Cabinet Committee on Infrastructure approved the electrification of this section in 2010. (Status as of March 2025).	Yes. The OHE height on this line has been raised to allow for the operation of double-stack container trains, particularly on the busy freight routes connecting to Bathinda. (Status as of June 2020).
Narwana-Patiala-Chandigarh	No. This line is a single track and is primarily used for passenger and regional traffic. There are no public announcements regarding plans for its doubling. A survey for a new line between Patiala-Jakhal/Narwana was conducted in 2011 but was shelved. (Status as of December 2016).	No. No specific plans have been publicly announced for OHE height raising on this particular route for double-stack containers. (Status as of March 2025).
Bhatinda-Bikaner-Jaisalmer	Yes(in-progress, 2017 completion). Doubling work is in progress on some sections. The Bhatinda-Bhildi doubling project, which covers a significant part of this route, was approved and a foundation stone was laid in December 2024. The doubling of the Bikaner-Lalgarh section has been completed. (Status as of December 2024).	The OHE height for double-stack containers has been raised on specific freight routes within this network. (Status as of December 2024).
Jaipur-Kota-Indore	Yes. The Jaipur-Sawai Madhopur and Kota-Bina sections are double-tracked. The doubling of the Ratlam-Indore section is in progress to improve connectivity, and a new Railway Under Bridge (RUB) is under construction near Darrah Nullah to ease traffic. (Status as of August 2025).	Yes. The OHE height on key sections of this route has been raised to facilitate double-stack container operations, especially on the busy freight corridors linking the ports of Gujarat to Central India. (Status as of January 2024).
Ghaziabad-Saharanpur-Rishikesh	Yes. The Ghaziabad-Saharanpur section is a crucial double-track main line. The Saharanpur-Rishikesh branch line is a single track. A survey for the doubling of this branch line was sanctioned in 2023, with a DPR for a metro lite project on this route also in progress. (Status as of August 2025).	Yes. The OHE height on the Ghaziabad-Saharanpur main line has been raised to facilitate the operation of double-stack container trains. There are no such plans for the Saharanpur-Rishikesh branch line. (Status as of March 2025).

=== Trains ===
In 2024, the Hisar station had 8,000 daily passenger traffic, 60 daily passenger and good trains. Direct passenger trains from Hisar are available for Delhi, Haridwar, Chandigarh, Jind, Kurukshetra, Bathinda, Ludhiana, Amritsar, Jammu, Katra, Mathura, Agra, Kanpur, Lucknow, Gonda, Gorakhpur, Agartala, Patna, Jalpaiguri, Guwahati, Lumding, Haflong, Prayagraj, Jaipur, Kota, Ajmer, Jodhpur, Bikaner, Ahmedabad, Vadodara, Mumbai, Goa, Udupi, Kannur, Kozhikode (Calicut), Coimbatore, Secunderabad, Jalgaon, Shegaon, Akola, Badnera, Wardha, Chandrapur, Kazipet, Sirsa, Bathinda and Firozpur.

== Present status ==
- 2025 May:
  - Fy2025-26 pink book also has following budget approval for Hisar, Hisar-Chiraud bypass line for higher speed operation, Hisar-Satrod-Hansi track doubling FSL for higher speed operation, Hisar-Raipur (near Hisar airport) track doubling for higher speed operation, Bhathinda-Hisar-Sadulpur-Churu-Ratangarh-Bhiladi-Gujarat track doubling for higher speed operation, capacity enhancement for running more trains (additional stabling line for storing trains, marshalling line for shunting coaches for new train, and Rs 68 crore 2 additional sick line for repair and washing work), OHE height raising for running double-stack container trains on Hisar-Bhiwani-Rewari dual-track line, 6 lifts (1 for each platform), Rs 16 cr for 12 m wide new footbridge and widening of existing footbridge to 12 m, health unit, laundry unit, community hall, and Janaushadhi Medical Store.
  - Proposal to build additional 2 platforms, number 7 and 8, has been sent to the railway headquarter. Due to the shortage of platforms, the Hisar-Chandigarh train (Barwala, Uklana, Jakhal, Narwana, Kaithal, Kurukshetra, and Ambala Cantt) starts from Raipur halt and Hisar-Bhiwani-Rewari-Gurugram train starts from Satroad station instead of Hisar station.
  - The survey for 25 km long railway bypass track from Hisar's Satrod to Chiraud via Dabra, Deva, Muklan has been completed and sent to railway headquarter for budget approval, and budget for DPR preparation is already in fy2025-26 pink book. This will allow freight trains to bypass the Hisar railway station freeing up the platforms for operation of more passenger trains.
  - A dedicated restricted-access military yard will be constructed at Satroad railway station at the cost of Rs 124 crore, which will have 6 dedicated lines, automated digital control system, large ramp and loading platforms for the swift automated loading and unloading.
  - Hisar-Hansi-Maham-Madina-Rohtak direct Fast Train announced by the railway minister has not commenced.

== See also ==
- Hisar Airport
- Transport in Haryana
- Tourism in Haryana
