= Bathinda–Rewari line =

Bathinda-Rewari line

Bathinda–Rewari line with links to Sadulpur, Rohtak and Jakkhal
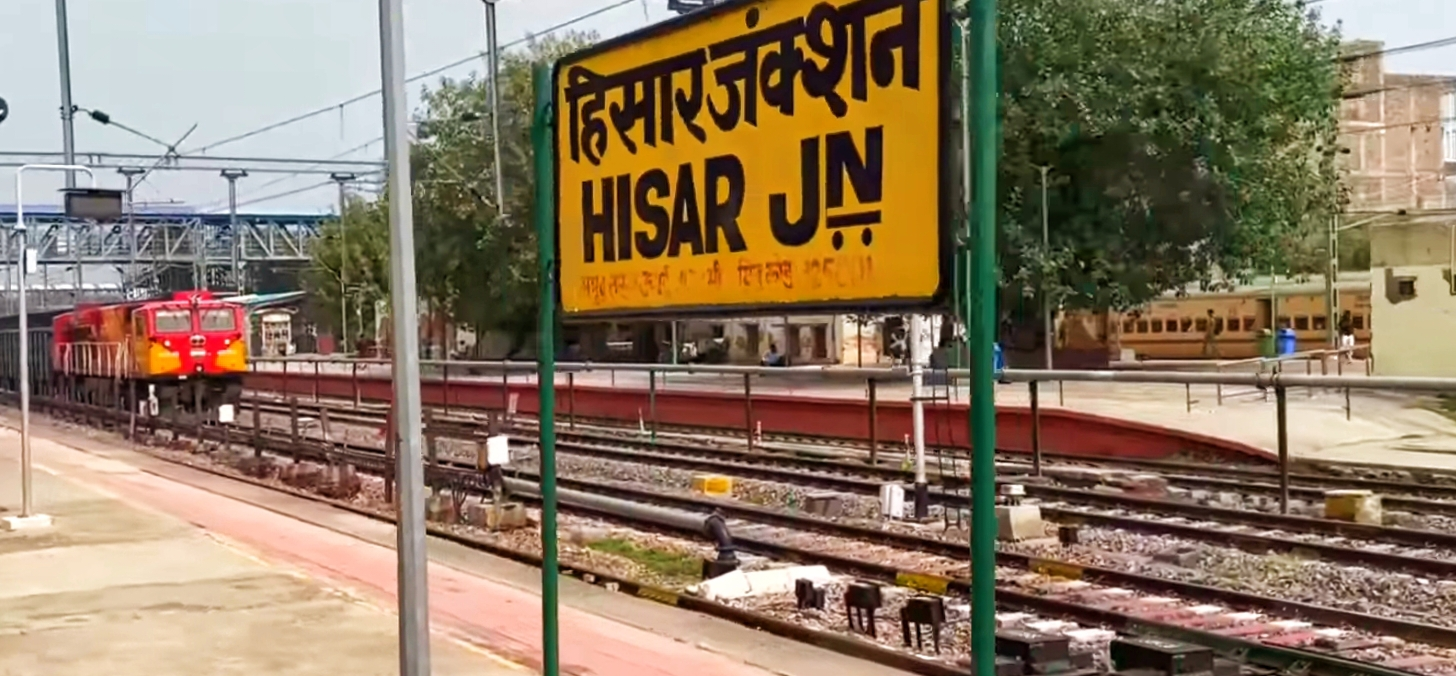
- Hisar Junction railway station is an important railway station on Bathinda–Rewari line at

Overview
- Status: Operational
- Owner: Indian Railways
- Locale: Haryana, Punjab, Rajasthan
- Termini: Bathinda; Rewari

Service
- Operator(s): Northern Railway; North Western Railway

History
- Opened: 1884

Technical
- Track length: Main line: 300 km (186 mi); Branch lines: Hisar–Sadulpur: 70 km (43 mi); Bhiwani–Rohtak: 49 km (30 mi); Hisar–Jakkhal: 82 km (51 mi)
- Track gauge: 1,676 mm (5 ft 6 in) broad gauge
- Electrification: Fully Electrified
- Highest elevation: Bathinda 208 m (682 ft), Rewari 245 m (804 ft)

The Bathinda–Rewari line is a railway line connecting Bathinda in the Indian state of the Punjab and Rewari in Haryana. There are links to Sadulpur and Rohtak also. The line is under the administrative jurisdiction of Northern Railway and North Western Railway.

== History ==
The Rajputana–Malwa Railway extended the 1,000 mm (3 ft 3 3/8 in)-wide metre gauge Delhi–Rewari line to Bathinda in 1884. The metre-gauge Hisar–Sadulpur link was laid in 1911. The Bhiwani–Rohtak link was laid in 1979. and the Hisar–Jakkhal link was also laid on 1 November 1913.

== Gauge conversion and electrification ==
The Bathinda–Rewari metre-gauge line was converted to 1,676 mm (5 ft 6 in)-wide broad gauge in 1994. The metre-gauge Hisar–Sadulpur link was converted to broad gauge in 2009. The Bhiwani–Rohtak link was also converted to broad gauge and the other link between Hisar–Jakkhal, too.

== Loco shed ==
The locomotive shed at Rewari has been restored. It now houses broad gauge locomotives.
