= Hinduism in India =

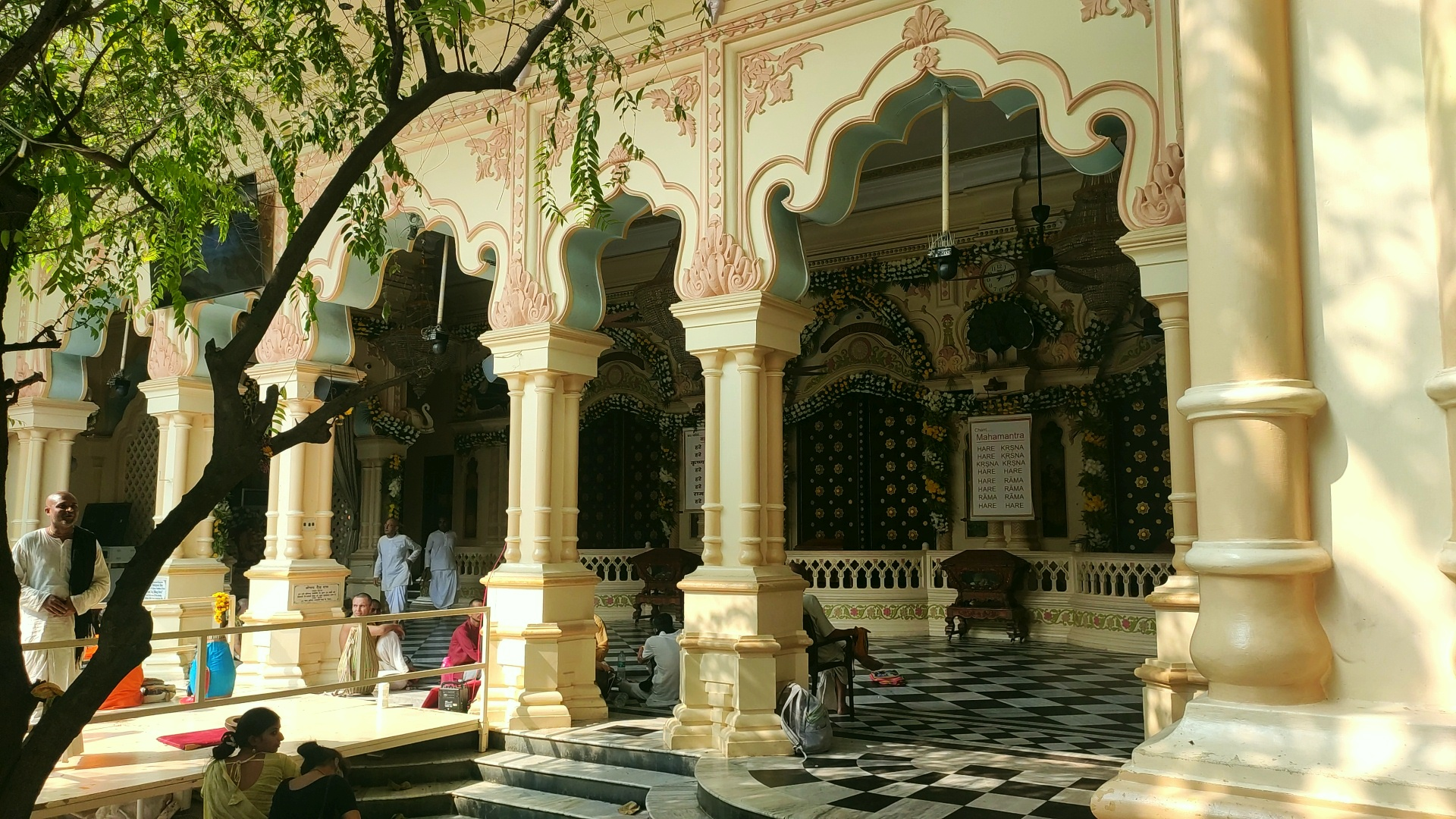
- Sri Krishna Balaram Mandir, Vrindavan, Uttar Pradesh

Total population
- ▲966,257,353 (79.8%) of the total Indian population (2011)

Regions with significant populations
- Uttar Pradesh: 192,000,000
- Bihar: 107,000,000
- Maharashtra: 101,000,000
- Madhya Pradesh: 78,000,000
- Rajasthan: 71,500,000
- West Bengal: 70,500,000
- Tamil Nadu: 68,000,000

Scriptures
- Vedas, Puranas, Upanishads, Mahabharata (incl. Bhagavad Gita), Ramayana, and others

Languages
- Sanskrit (sacred); Indian languages (according to the region)

Hinduism is the largest and most practised religion in India. About 79.8% of the country's population is Hindu. India is home to 94% of the global Hindu population, making it the largest homeland of Hindus worldwide. The vast majority of Indian Hindus belong to Vaishnavite, Shaivite, and Shakti denominations. India is one of the two Hindu-majority countries in the world along with Nepal (81.19%).

== History of Hinduism ==
The Vedic culture developed in India in 1500 BCE and 500 BCE. After this period, the Vedic religion, native to northern India, expanded to the entire subcontinent, resulting in the emergence of Hinduism, which has had a profound impact on India's history, culture, and philosophy. The name India itself is derived from Sanskrit Sindhu, the historic local appellation for the Indus River.

India saw the rule of both Hindu and Muslim rulers from c. 1200 CE to 1750 CE. The fall of Vijayanagara Empire to Muslim sultans had marked the end of Hindu dominance in the Deccan. Hinduism once again rose to political prestige, under the Maratha Empire.

== Partition of India ==
The 1947 partition of India gave rise to bloody rioting and indiscriminate inter-communal killing of Hindus, Muslims, and Sikhs across the Indian subcontinent, especially in Punjab and Bengal regions. An estimated 7.3 million Hindus and Sikhs moved to India and 7.2 million Muslims moved to Pakistan permanently, leading to demographic change of both the nations to a certain extent. As a result of this, India's Hindu population have increased exponentially from 74.8% in 1941 to 84.1% in 1951 Census respectively.

"I find no parallel in history for a body of converts and their descendants claiming to be a nation apart from the parent stock."

— Mahatma Gandhi, opposing the division of India on the basis of religion in 1944.

=== Hindu population decline in South Asia ===
Hinduism dropped from 72% in British Raj of 1891 to 69% in 1921. In 1941 British census, Hindus comprised 69.5% of Undivided India. It further declined to just 66% in Undivided India since Muslims would make up 32% of Undivided India's population in 2024, if not partitioned, respectively.

== Demographics ==
The Hindu population has tripled from 303,675,084 in 1951 to 966,257,353 in 2011, but the Hindu percentage share of total population has declined from 84.1% in 1951 to 79.8% in 2011. When India achieved independence in 1947, Hindus formed roughly 85% of the total population and pre-Partition British India had about 73% of Hindus.

Historical Hindu Population
Year	Pop.	±%
1951	303,675,084	—
1961	366,541,417	+20.7%
1971	453,492,481	+23.7%
1981	562,379,847	+24.0%
1991	690,091,965	+22.7%
2001	827,722,142	+19.9%
2011	966,257,353	+16.7%
Source: census of India

=== Projections ===
According to a report by the Pew Research Center (PRC), the Hindu population in India is projected to reach almost 1.3 billion by 2050, within a total population nearing 1.7 billion. Despite this growth, the community proportion within the nation's population is anticipated to decrease by 2.8 percent, declining from 79.5 percent in 2010 to 76.7 percent in 2050, owing to low fertility rate, high mortality rate and emigration, respectively.

=== Fertility rates ===
The latest round of the National Family Health Survey (NFHS-5), conducted from 2019-2021, has shown a notable change in fertility trends in India. The Total Fertility Rate (TFR), which measures the average number of children per woman, has dropped below the replacement level of 2.1 respectively. Specifically, among Hindus, the TFR stands at 1.9, indicating that on average, each Hindu woman is having fewer than two children in her reproductive lifespan. This trend suggests a significant shift towards smaller family sizes within the Hindu community, reflecting broader demographic changes in the country.

=== Emigration ===
A report published by Pakistani newspaper Dawn indicates that over 5,000 Pakistani Hindus migrate to India annually as refugees. Dr. Abul Barkat, a esteemed academic figure affiliated with Dhaka University, has provided insights indicating that an estimated 230,000 Bangladeshi Hindus undertake migration to India annually, with the primary motive of seeking asylum and ensuring personal safety. This migration pattern underscores a notable trend contributing to a substantial influx of refugees from Bangladesh to India.

=== Population by state and territory ===
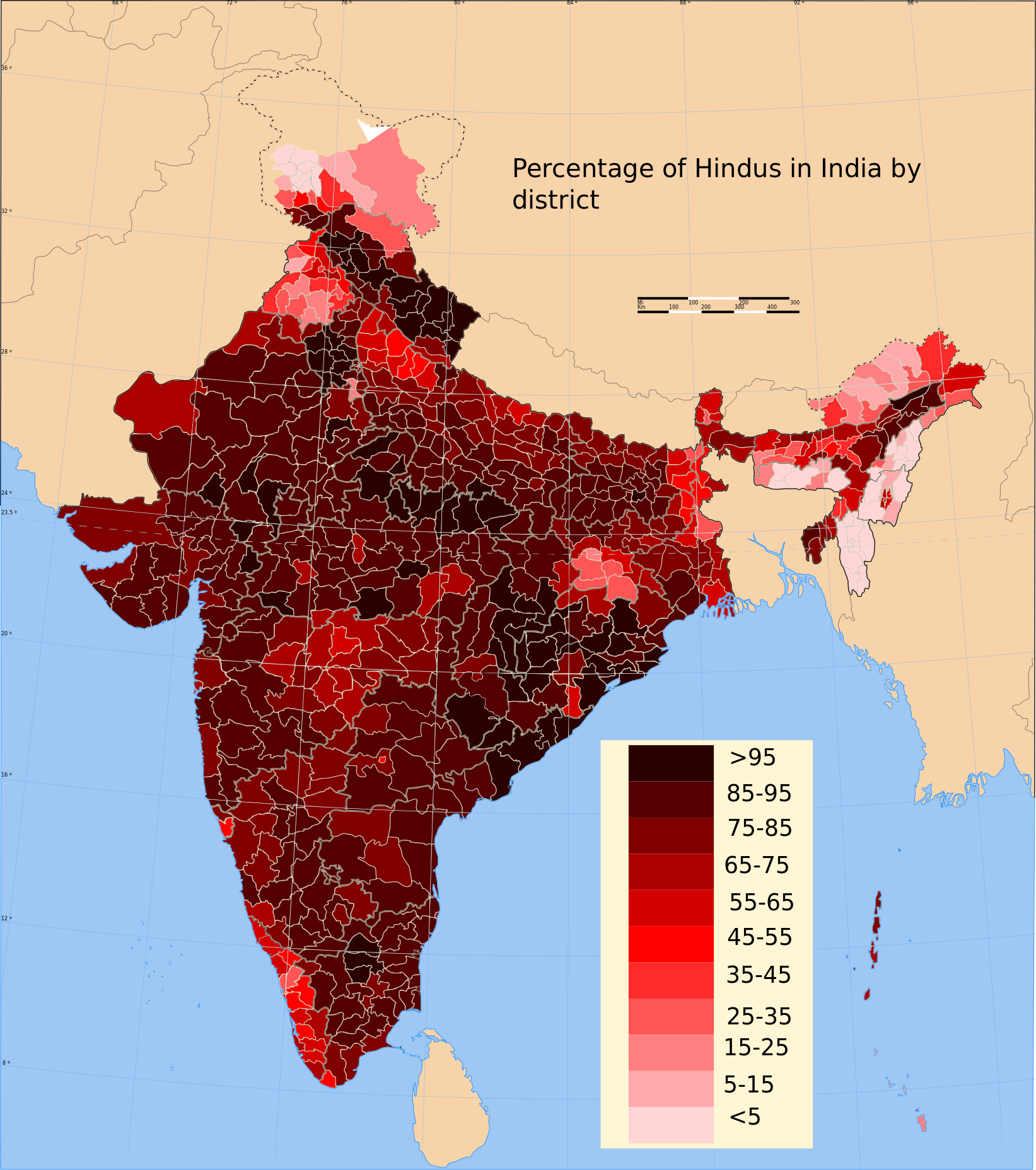
Percentage of Hindus in each district. Data derived from 2011 census.

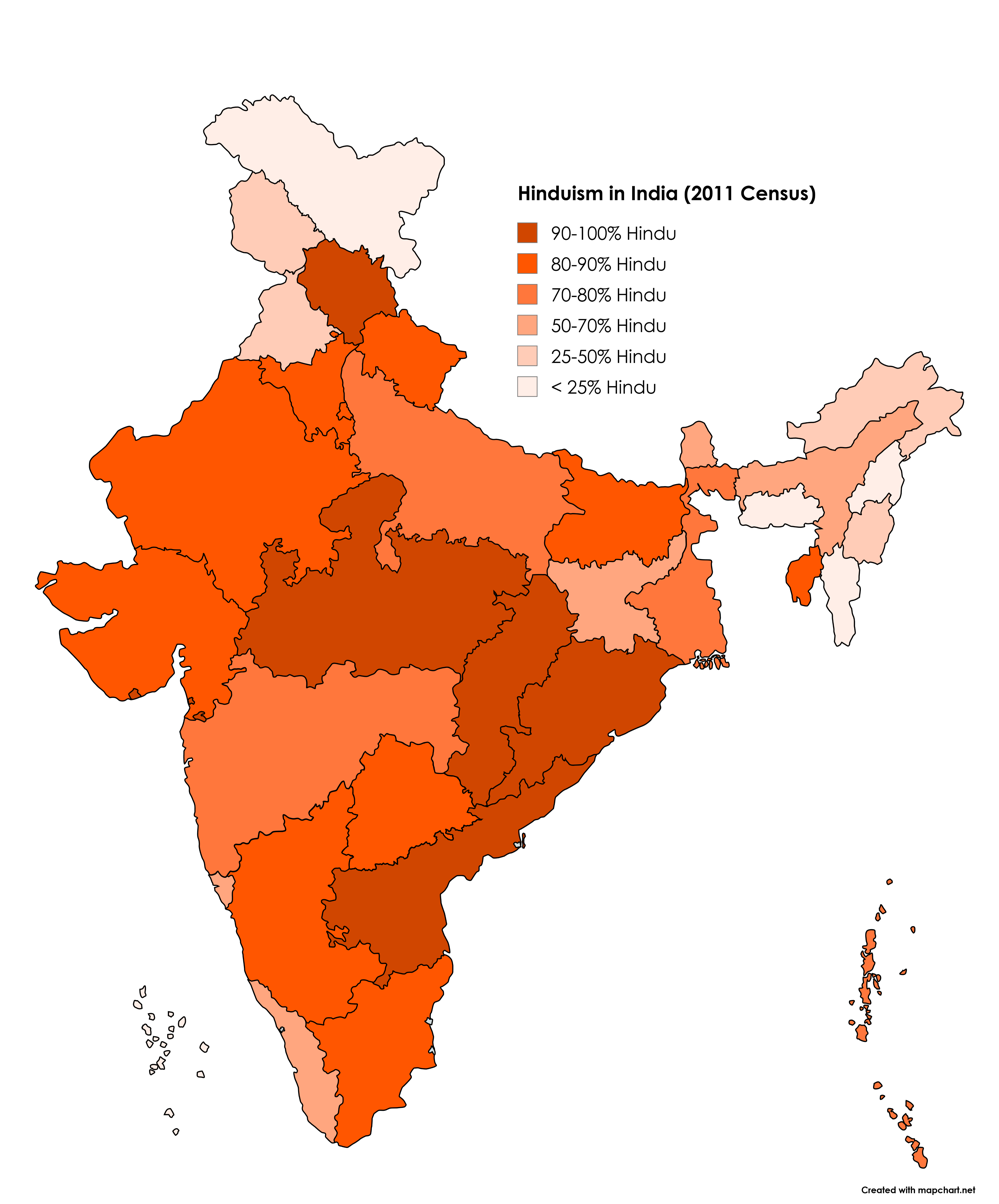
Hinduism by percent of Indian State/Union Territory, 2011 census

Hindu population by state / UT, according to the 2011 census
State/UT	Total	Hindus	% Hindus
Himachal Pradesh	6,864,602	6,532,765	95.17%
Dadra and Nagar Haveli	343,709	322,857	93.93%
Odisha	41,974,218	39,300,341	93.63%
Chhattisgarh	25,545,198	23,819,789	93.25%
Madhya Pradesh	72,626,809	66,007,121	90.89%
Daman and Diu	243,247	220,150	90.50%
Gujarat	60,439,692	53,533,988	88.57%
Rajasthan	68,548,437	60,657,103	88.49%
Andhra Pradesh (incl. Telangana)	84,580,777	74,824,149	88.46%
Tamil Nadu	72,147,030	63,188,168	87.58%
Haryana	25,351,462	22,171,128	87.46%
Puducherry	1,247,953	1,089,409	87.30%
Karnataka	61,095,297	51,317,472	84.00%
Tripura	3,673,917	3,063,903	83.40%
Uttarakhand	10,086,292	8,368,636	82.97%
Bihar	104,099,452	86,078,686	82.69%
Delhi	16,787,941	13,712,100	81.68%
Chandigarh	1,055,450	852,574	80.78%
Maharashtra	112,374,333	89,703,056	79.83%
Uttar Pradesh	199,812,341	159,312,654	79.73%
West Bengal	91,276,115	64,385,546	70.54%
Andaman and Nicobar Islands	380,581	264,296	69.45%
Jharkhand	32,988,134	22,376,051	67.83%
Goa	1,458,545	963,877	66.08%
Assam	31,205,576	19,180,759	61.47%
Sikkim	610,577	352,662	57.76%
Kerala	33,406,061	18,282,492	54.73%
Manipur	2,855,794	1,181,876	41.39%
Punjab	27,743,338	10,678,138	38.49%
Arunachal Pradesh	1,383,727	401,876	29.04%
Jammu and Kashmir	12,541,302	3,566,674	28.44%
Meghalaya	2,966,889	342,078	11.53%
Nagaland	1,978,502	173,054	8.75%
Lakshadweep	64,473	1,788	2.77%
Mizoram	1,097,206	30,136	2.75%
All of India	1,210,854,977	966,257,353	79.80%

== Sacred Places ==
The geography of India is not merely a physical terrain for Hindus, but a sacred, storied landscape. The land is inextricably linked to divine narratives and ritual practices. Tirthas, temples, rivers, and mountains make up the historical Hindu sacred sites of the land.

=== Tirthas ===
Across the Indian subcontinent there are sets of various sacred places called tirths such as the twelve jyotirlingas, saptapuri (seven cities of liberation), Shakta Pithas, and Chard Dham. Hindu geography is organized into several sets that define the extent of the land and create a sense of "nationhood" that predates the modern state.

=== Natural Features ===
Rivers like the Ganga, Yamuna, and Godavari are viewed as liquid forms of Shakti (divine energy) that descended to earth to purify humanity and offer a path to the "far shore" of immortality. The Himalayas are the "abode of the gods," and the individual hills/mountains like Arunachala or Govardhan are worshipped as the physical forms of Shiva or Krishna themselves.

== Hindu ethnicities ==
- Kashmiri Hindus
- Sindhi Hindus
- Punjabi Hindus
- Bengali Hindus
- Meitei Hindus
- Tamil Hindus

== Hinduism in states ==
- Hinduism in Maharashtra
- Hinduism in Karnataka
- Hinduism in Telangana
- Hinduism in Tamil Nadu
- Hinduism in Odisha
- Hinduism in West Bengal
- Hinduism in Assam
- Hinduism in Manipur
- Hinduism in Meghalaya
- Hinduism in Mizoram
- Hinduism in Goa
- Hinduism in Delhi

== Law and politics ==
=== Demand for Hindu state ===
Although the Constitution of India has declared the nation as a secular state with no state religion, it has been argued several times that the Indian state privileges Hinduism as state sponsored religion constitutionally, legislatively and culturally.

- The original copy of the Indian constitution has an illustration of Rama, Sita, and Lakshmana in Part III on Fundamental Rights and Rama has been considered as the true guardian of people's rights.
- Article 343 (1) of the Indian Constitution also states that, "The official language of the Union shall be Hindi in Devanagari script".
- Also, Article 48 of Indian constitution prohibits the slaughter of cows or calves (a sacred animal in Hinduism) and it is a criminal offense in most of the states of India.

Some right-wing Hindu organisations like Rashtriya Swayamsevak Sangh, Hindu Mahasabha, Bajrang Dal, Vishwa Hindu Parishad etc. have demanded that India should be declared a Hindu nation by constitution to safeguard the rights and life of Hindus in this largest democracy. As of 28 July 2020, there were pleas going on Supreme Court of India to remove the words secular and socialist from the Preamble to the Constitution of India. As far as citizens are concerned, only 7 out of 20 Indian Hindus are in favor of making India a Hindu Nation. Nearly two-thirds of Indian Hindus, constituting 64% of the population, believe that it is very important to be Hindu to be considered truly Indian or a citizen of India respectively.

=== Citizenship Amendment Act, 2019 ===
The Citizenship (Amendment) Act, 2019 is a law passed in India in December 2019. Under the Citizenship (Amendment) Rules, 2024, it provides a fast-track to Indian citizenship for undocumented immigrants from neighbouring countries, namely Hindus and five other specific communities: Christians, Sikhs, Buddhists, Parsis, and Jains, who arrived in India before 31 December 2014. The law has reduced the residency requirement for undocumented immigrants from select religious minorities, including Hindus, from 11 years to 5 years for acquiring Indian citizenship through naturalization. This provision aims to expedite the citizenship process for these specific persecuted minority groups of neighbouring nations of Pakistan, Afghanistan and Bangladesh.

== See also ==
- Hinduism by country
- Religion in India
- Caste system in India
- Other Backward Class
- Hindus by district in India
- Hinduism in South India
- List of Hindu temples in India
- Freedom of religion in India
- Hindu Marriage Act, 1955
- Hindu Code Bills
