= Sivanandha =

Indian Hindu guru

Sivanadha Mouna Swamigal
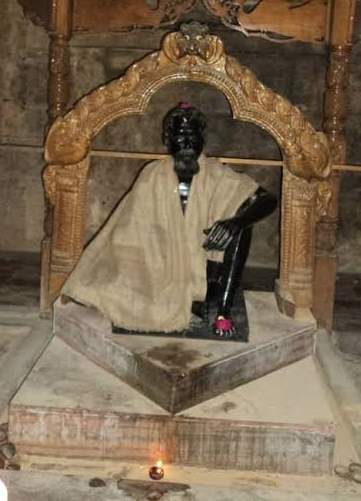

Personal life
- Born: Chinnappa Mesthiri; 9 March 1965 North Arcot, Gudiyattam, British India (now in Andhra Pradesh)

Religious life
- Religion: Hinduism
- Founder of: Sivananda Mauna Swami Return Volunteer, Board of Trustees
- Philosophy: Practise one hour of silence every day

Sivanandha, known among his followers as Sri Sivanandha Mouna Guru or Siddhar Sivanandha, is a South Indian spiritual guru, left home and went to Mahadeva Hill to perform penance.People started calling him "Silent Swamis" because he remained silent, and later after Patti Celliyamman came to the temple and performed many miracles there, the god Kandak appeared in the dream of the Swamis and ordered them to give the people a bow and arrow to cure 108 ailments. Illnesses are also cured. Vilva leaf vibudhi is also an excellent medicine used to cure incurable diseases in the temple from the Himalayas to KanyaKumari and from abroad when it was restored in the temple by the order of Kandan.

== Early life ==
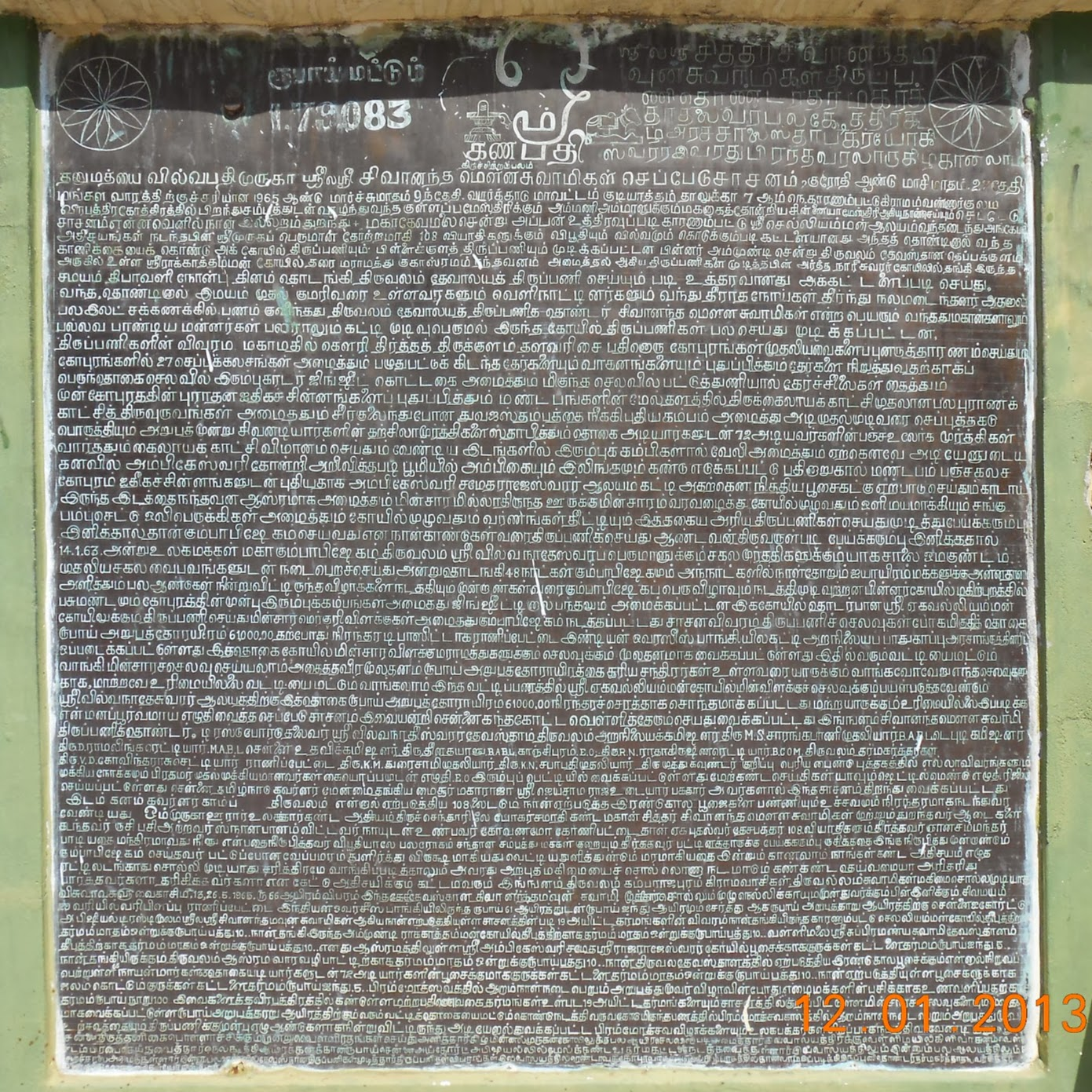
Vilwanatheswarar temple Tamil copper-plate inscriptions for Siddhar Sivanandha

Sivanandha was born on 9 March 1965 in Vadarkadu District,Gudiyattam, the son of Chinnaiya Mastery and Ammani ammal, who was born and lived with wealth in the village Vannar Kulam Virabhadra tribe.
