= Hinduism in Delhi =

Overview of Hinduism in New Delhi

Hindus of Delhi
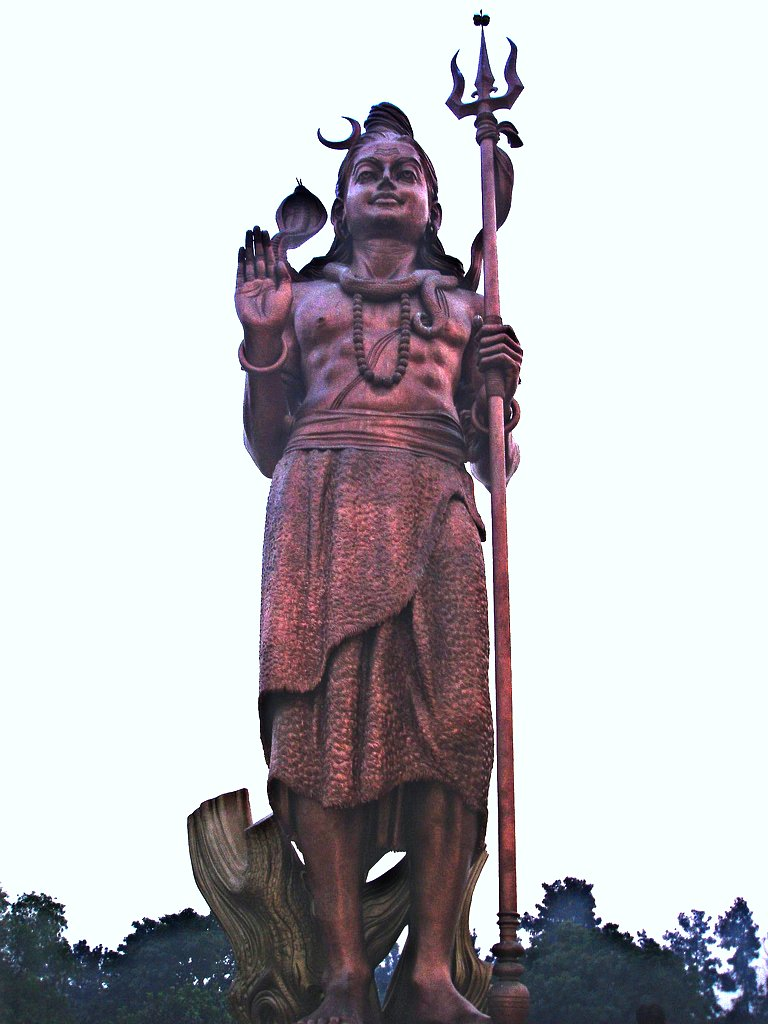
- Statue of Shiva in Delhi.

Total population
- 13,712,100 (2011); 81.68% of total population

Religions
- Hinduism

Languages
- Sanskrit (sacred); Hindi (majority) and other languages, mainly by diaspora

Hinduism is the majority religion in Delhi, India. According to the 2011 Census of India, the National Capital Territory of Delhi has 13,712,100 Hindus, who form 81.68% of the population. Hinduism can be extensively seen in culture and history of Delhi and was established by Hindu Tomara king, Anangpala. Though, the Hindus have seen some decline in the Delhi Sultanate and Mughal Empire, due to conversions and persecution. Delhi is also home to many Hindu temple and ashrams. There are more than 590 registered temples in Delhi, out of which Kalka, Birla, Akshardham and ISKCON Temple are the most visited.

== History ==
=== Early history ===
Hinduism is believed to have been present in Delhi from prehistoric times, during the times of Pandavas when it was their capital by the name of Indraprastha and was under the control of Kuru kingdom. The area city was also under the rule of the Maurya Empire from 300–100 BCE. The region has been significantly invaded and ruled by many dynasty from 200–800 CE, mainly under the Gupta and Kushan Empire due to its location. Then the city was first time established in 1052 CE by Hindu king, Anangpal Tomar of Tomara dynasty, when he established Anangpur as the capital city of his kingdom.

== Demographics ==
=== Population by District ===
#	Sub-district	Total population	Hindu population	%
1	Central Delhi	582320	364148	62.53%
2	East Delhi	1709346	1410852	82.54%
3	New Delhi	142004	124482	87.66%
4	North Delhi	887978	726443	81.81%
5	North East Delhi	2241624	1529337	68.22%
6	North West Delhi	3656539	3211042	87.82%
7	South Delhi	2731929	2155759	78.91%
8	South West Delhi	2292958	2102743	91.70%
9	West Delhi	2543243	2087294	82.07%

=== Population by sub-district ===
#	Sub-district	Total population	Hindu population	%
1	Chanakya Puri	61382	53027	86.39%
2	Civil Lines	688616	619824	90.01%
3	Connaught Place	28228	24444	86.59%
4	Darya Ganj	271108	89320	32.95%
5	Defence Colony	637775	408380	64.03%
6	Delhi Cantonment	286140	260060	90.89%
7	Gandhi Nagar	395342	298533	75.51%
8	Hauz Khas	1231293	1022037	83.01%
9	Kalkaji	862861	725342	84.06%
10	Karol Bagh	136599	124374	91.05%
11	Kotwali	69174	41588	60.12%
12	Model Town	595810	490973	82.40%
13	Najafgarh	1365152	1268010	92.88%
14	Narela	809913	719023	88.78%
15	Pahar Ganj	174613	150454	86.16%
16	Parliament Street	52394	47011	89.73%
17	Patel Nagar	1262158	1018371	80.68%
18	Preet Vihar	1066098	898326	84.26%
19	Punjabi Bagh	799453	698884	87.42%
20	Rajouri Garden	481632	370039	76.83%
21	Sadar Bazar	130188	65031	49.95%
22	Saraswati Vihar	2250816	2001046	88.90%
23	Seelam Pur	1378779	892857	64.76%
24	Seema Puri	539914	430496	79.73%
25	Shahdara	322931	205984	63.79%
26	Vasant Vihar	641666	574673	89.56%
27	Vivek Vihar	247906	213993	86.32%

== Communities ==
In local and rural Delhi, the communities like the Rajputs, Jats, Gujjars, Brahmins, Dalits, Valmikis, Baniyas, etc. have been residing in Delhi from a long time. After Partition, many Punjabis (mainly Hindus and Sikhs) from Pakistan came and settled in New Delhi. Due to Urbanization of New Delhi many people of Bihar, Haryana, Uttarakhand, Uttar Pradesh and other neighbouring regions came to settle in Delhi.
