= Hindus by district in India =

This article contains population of Hindus by districts in India of different states and union territories.

The list of district is taken as per the 2001 and 2011 census of India as published by the Registrar General and Census Commissioner of India.

== Statistics ==
States and District	Population		Hindu Population		Hindu %		Birth Rate ('95 to '01)	
States and District	Total	Under 6	Total	Under 6	Total	Under 6	Total	Hindu
Jammu and Kashmir	10,143,700	1,485,803	3,005,349	399,666	29.63%	26.90%	24.41	22.16
Kupwara	650,393	112,596	12,708	91	1.95%	0.08%	28.85	1.19
Baramula	1,169,780	185,169	15,191	482	1.30%	0.26%	26.38	5.29
Srinagar	1,202,447	129,230	48,853	1,784	4.06%	1.38%	17.91	6.09
Badgam	629,309	97,534	6,533	189	1.04%	0.19%	25.83	4.82
Pulwama	652,607	84,984	6,088	165	0.93%	0.19%	21.70	4.52
Anantnag	1,172,434	177,120	11,589	299	0.99%	0.17%	25.18	4.30
Leh (Ladakh)	117,232	12,732	9,573	608	8.17%	4.78%	18.10	10.59
Kargil	119,307	19,381	5,142	69	4.31%	0.36%	27.07	2.24
Doda	691,929	119,031	286,849	46,029	41.46%	38.67%	28.67	26.74
Udhampur	743,509	121,446	542,593	83,085	72.98%	68.41%	27.22	25.52
Punch	372,613	67,059	19,391	1,996	5.20%	2.98%	29.99	17.16
Rajauri	483,284	79,394	180,162	24,267	37.28%	30.57%	27.38	22.45
Jammu	1,588,772	198,825	1,366,711	169,283	86.02%	85.14%	20.86	20.64
Kathua	550,084	81,302	493,966	71,319	89.80%	87.72%	24.63	24.06
Himachal Pradesh	6,077,900	793,137	5,800,222	755,834	95.43%	95.31%	21.75	21.72
Chamba	460,887	69,579	428,134	63,846	92.89%	91.76%	25.16	24.85
Kangra	1,339,030	164,566	1,301,544	159,971	97.20%	97.21%	20.48	20.48
Lahul & Spiti	33,224	3,664	13,428	1,322	40.42%	36.08%	18.38	16.41
Kullu	381,571	52,820	363,646	50,967	95.30%	96.49%	23.07	23.36
Mandi	901,344	119,949	885,097	117,833	98.20%	98.24%	22.18	22.19
Hamirpur	412,700	50,699	408,130	50,118	98.89%	98.85%	20.47	20.47
Una	448,273	59,712	412,491	54,675	92.02%	91.56%	22.20	22.09
Bilaspur	340,885	42,890	331,772	41,715	97.33%	97.26%	20.97	20.96
Solan	500,557	66,434	475,595	63,184	95.01%	95.11%	22.12	22.14
Sirmaur	458,593	68,431	418,214	62,179	91.20%	90.86%	24.87	24.78
Shimla	722,502	85,089	704,150	82,984	97.46%	97.53%	19.63	19.64
Kinnaur	78,334	9,304	58,021	7,040	74.07%	75.67%	19.80	20.22
Punjab	24,358,999	3,171,829	8,997,942	1,187,569	36.94%	37.44%	21.70	22.00
Gurdaspur	2,104,011	280,149	996,246	128,207	47.35%	45.76%	22.19	21.45
Amritsar	3,096,077	429,025	648,284	79,796	20.94%	18.60%	23.10	20.51
Kapurthala	754,521	95,004	286,438	37,344	37.96%	39.31%	20.99	21.73
Jalandhar	1,962,700	230,155	1,158,868	142,036	59.04%	61.71%	19.54	20.43
Hoshiarpur	1,480,736	184,223	871,923	114,153	58.88%	61.96%	20.74	21.82
Nawanshahr	587,468	71,419	356,710	46,868	60.72%	65.62%	20.26	21.90
Rupnagar	1,116,108	142,623	452,419	62,520	40.54%	43.84%	21.30	23.03
Fatehgarh Sahib	538,041	66,374	122,656	16,391	22.80%	24.69%	20.56	22.27
Ludhiana	3,032,831	371,010	1,205,128	156,343	39.74%	42.14%	20.39	21.62
Moga	894,854	116,296	117,786	15,234	13.16%	13.10%	21.66	21.56
Firozpur	1,746,107	257,754	820,234	119,940	46.98%	46.53%	24.60	24.37
Muktsar	777,493	104,585	196,039	27,958	25.21%	26.73%	22.42	23.77
Faridkot	550,892	73,742	119,702	16,072	21.73%	21.79%	22.31	22.38
Bathinda	1,183,295	149,358	292,984	37,956	24.76%	25.41%	21.04	21.59
Mansa	688,758	96,089	139,225	20,383	20.21%	21.21%	23.25	24.40
Sangrur	2,000,173	263,993	434,873	59,030	21.74%	22.36%	22.00	22.62
Patiala	1,844,934	240,030	778,427	107,338	42.19%	44.72%	21.68	22.98
Chandigarh	900,635	115,613	707,978	95,017	78.61%	82.19%	21.39	22.37
Uttarakhand	8,489,349	1,360,032	7,212,260	1,108,321	84.96%	81.49%	26.70	25.61
Uttarkashi	295,013	49,758	290,201	49,071	98.37%	98.62%	28.11	28.18
Chamoli	370,359	55,710	365,396	55,023	98.66%	98.77%	25.07	25.10
Rudraprayag	227,439	35,876	225,773	35,630	99.27%	99.31%	26.29	26.30
Tehri Garhwal	604,747	98,524	596,769	97,450	98.68%	98.91%	27.15	27.22
Dehradun	1,282,143	172,486	1,086,094	139,869	84.71%	81.09%	22.42	21.46
Pauri Garhwal	697,078	101,255	673,471	97,431	96.61%	96.22%	24.21	24.11
Pithoragarh	462,289	72,080	456,277	71,343	98.70%	98.98%	25.99	26.06
Bageshwar	249,462	41,206	247,402	40,923	99.17%	99.31%	27.53	27.57
Almora	630,567	97,368	621,203	96,113	98.51%	98.71%	25.74	25.79
Champawat	224,542	39,939	216,646	38,669	96.48%	96.82%	29.64	29.75
Nainital	762,909	113,645	655,290	95,301	85.89%	83.86%	24.83	24.24
Udham Singh Nagar	1,235,614	219,291	832,811	140,534	67.40%	64.09%	29.58	28.12
Haridwar	1,447,187	262,894	944,927	150,964	65.29%	57.42%	30.28	26.63
Haryana	21,144,564	3,335,537	18,655,925	2,872,025	88.23%	86.10%	26.29	25.66
Panchkula	468,411	65,997	410,120	57,585	87.56%	87.25%	23.48	23.40
Ambala	1,014,411	134,369	856,193	115,214	84.40%	85.74%	22.08	22.43
Yamunanagar	1,041,630	150,008	849,255	118,157	81.53%	78.77%	24.00	23.19
Kurukshetra	825,454	117,255	675,381	98,239	81.82%	83.78%	23.67	24.24
Kaithal	946,131	145,487	848,765	132,585	89.71%	91.13%	25.63	26.03
Karnal	1,274,183	192,690	1,125,279	171,930	88.31%	89.23%	25.20	25.46
Panipat	967,449	158,592	873,593	139,963	90.30%	88.25%	27.32	26.70
Sonipat	1,279,175	196,479	1,234,225	188,099	96.49%	95.73%	25.60	25.40
Jind	1,189,827	187,560	1,134,539	179,337	95.35%	95.62%	26.27	26.35
Fatehabad	806,158	129,744	660,331	108,947	81.91%	83.97%	26.82	27.50
Sirsa	1,116,649	167,677	801,747	123,377	71.80%	73.58%	25.03	25.65
Hisar	1,537,117	237,820	1,497,776	231,930	97.44%	97.52%	25.79	25.81
Bhiwani	1,425,022	224,226	1,407,363	221,142	98.76%	98.62%	26.22	26.19
Rohtak	940,128	136,424	924,541	134,170	98.34%	98.35%	24.19	24.19
Jhajjar	880,072	131,740	869,258	129,888	98.77%	98.59%	24.95	24.90
Mahendragarh	812,521	128,151	805,991	127,139	99.20%	99.21%	26.29	26.29
Rewari	765,351	116,564	758,328	115,467	99.08%	99.06%	25.38	25.38
Gurgaon	1,660,289	333,417	1,026,542	164,903	61.83%	49.46%	33.47	26.77
Faridabad	2,194,586	381,337	1,896,698	313,953	86.43%	82.33%	28.96	27.59
Delhi	13,850,507	2,016,849	11,358,049	1,619,920	82.00%	80.32%	24.27	23.77
North West	2,860,869	430,805	2,540,491	379,262	88.80%	88.04%	25.10	24.88
North	781,525	107,113	609,493	80,807	77.99%	75.44%	22.84	22.10
North East	1,768,061	296,317	1,232,960	193,051	69.74%	65.15%	27.93	26.10
East	1,463,583	205,573	1,213,295	166,748	82.90%	81.11%	23.41	22.91
New Delhi	179,112	21,496	155,594	18,633	86.87%	86.68%	20.00	19.96
Central	646,385	80,480	423,592	48,506	65.53%	60.27%	20.75	19.09
West	2,128,908	289,668	1,745,810	239,902	82.00%	82.82%	22.68	22.90
South West	1,755,041	250,456	1,612,169	229,561	91.86%	91.66%	23.78	23.73
South	2,267,023	334,941	1,824,645	263,450	80.49%	78.66%	24.62	24.06
Rajasthan	56,507,188	10,651,002	50,151,452	9,436,653	88.75%	88.60%	31.41	31.36
Ganganagar	1,789,423	298,165	1,299,812	223,584	72.64%	74.99%	27.77	28.67
Hanumangarh	1,518,005	256,102	1,227,688	208,550	80.88%	81.43%	28.12	28.31
Bikaner	1,674,271	326,680	1,445,088	286,752	86.31%	87.78%	32.52	33.07
Churu	1,923,878	383,914	1,698,106	337,330	88.26%	87.87%	33.26	33.11
Jhunjhunun	1,913,689	335,259	1,713,599	292,054	89.54%	87.11%	29.20	28.41
Alwar	2,992,592	581,916	2,535,155	470,072	84.71%	80.78%	32.41	30.90
Bharatpur	2,101,142	428,181	1,804,599	353,305	85.89%	82.51%	33.96	32.63
Dhaulpur	983,258	220,261	918,158	206,052	93.38%	93.55%	37.34	37.40
Karauli	1,209,665	249,342	1,138,712	233,484	94.13%	93.64%	34.35	34.17
Sawai Madhopur	1,117,057	206,750	978,292	178,282	87.58%	86.23%	30.85	30.37
Dausa	1,317,063	264,978	1,276,926	256,640	96.95%	96.85%	33.53	33.50
Jaipur	5,251,071	919,392	4,629,461	807,154	88.16%	87.79%	29.18	29.06
Sikar	2,287,788	418,583	2,019,396	363,944	88.27%	86.95%	30.49	30.04
Nagaur	2,775,058	526,511	2,399,173	448,397	86.45%	85.16%	31.62	31.15
Jodhpur	2,886,505	557,374	2,528,049	487,439	87.58%	87.45%	32.18	32.14
Jaisalmer	508,247	112,026	383,638	82,968	75.48%	74.06%	36.74	36.04
Barmer	1,964,835	435,835	1,695,047	376,915	86.27%	86.48%	36.97	37.06
Jalor	1,448,940	311,090	1,368,861	295,494	94.47%	94.99%	35.78	35.98
Sirohi	851,107	168,985	810,765	162,917	95.26%	96.41%	33.09	33.49
Pali	1,820,251	337,864	1,677,038	311,853	92.13%	92.30%	30.94	30.99
Ajmer	2,181,670	373,686	1,869,044	316,854	85.67%	84.79%	28.55	28.25
Tonk	1,211,671	223,728	1,062,365	195,841	87.68%	87.54%	30.77	30.72
Bundi	962,620	174,851	881,956	161,449	91.62%	92.34%	30.27	30.51
Bhilwara	2,013,789	359,615	1,859,972	334,055	92.36%	92.89%	29.76	29.93
Rajsamand	987,024	180,184	939,811	173,217	95.22%	96.13%	30.43	30.72
Udaipur	2,633,312	491,708	2,449,773	468,755	93.03%	95.33%	31.12	31.89
Dungarpur	1,107,643	231,647	1,068,319	226,108	96.45%	97.61%	34.86	35.27
Banswara	1,501,589	315,240	1,425,287	303,270	94.92%	96.20%	34.99	35.46
Chittaurgarh	1,803,524	311,367	1,666,452	289,252	92.40%	92.90%	28.77	28.93
Kota	1,568,525	250,910	1,344,633	214,957	85.73%	85.67%	26.66	26.64
Baran	1,021,653	189,559	948,343	176,072	92.82%	92.89%	30.92	30.94
Jhalawar	1,180,323	209,299	1,087,934	193,637	92.17%	92.52%	29.55	29.66
Uttar Pradesh	166,197,921	31,624,628	133,979,263	24,983,544	80.61%	79.00%	31.71	31.08
Saharanpur	2,896,863	538,226	1,723,226	285,625	59.49%	53.07%	30.97	27.63
Muzaffarnagar	3,543,362	677,902	2,151,009	358,106	60.71%	52.83%	31.89	27.75
Bijnor	3,131,619	615,829	1,766,391	320,326	56.41%	52.02%	32.77	30.22
Moradabad	3,810,983	773,996	2,052,014	392,054	53.84%	50.65%	33.85	31.84
Rampur	1,923,739	398,223	905,062	188,516	47.05%	47.34%	34.50	34.72
Jyotiba Phule Nagar	1,499,068	302,245	897,785	173,775	59.89%	57.49%	33.60	32.26
Meerut	2,997,361	517,960	1,964,504	304,140	65.54%	58.72%	28.80	25.80
Baghpat	1,163,991	205,254	854,718	134,626	73.43%	65.59%	29.39	26.25
Ghaziabad	3,290,586	566,447	2,461,008	385,046	74.79%	67.98%	28.69	26.08
Gautam Buddha Nagar	1,202,030	218,359	1,028,937	180,965	85.60%	82.87%	30.28	29.31
Bulandshahar	2,913,122	542,329	2,285,976	409,103	78.47%	75.43%	31.03	29.83
Aligarh	2,992,286	562,946	2,438,496	451,693	81.49%	80.24%	31.36	30.87
Hathras	1,336,031	255,055	1,194,514	224,976	89.41%	88.21%	31.82	31.39
Mathura	2,074,516	405,854	1,898,399	367,381	91.51%	90.52%	32.61	32.25
Agra	3,620,436	660,605	3,244,492	594,533	89.62%	90.00%	30.41	30.54
Firozabad	2,052,958	400,407	1,764,268	342,972	85.94%	85.66%	32.51	32.40
Etah	2,790,410	556,441	2,434,856	482,353	87.26%	86.69%	33.24	33.02
Mainpuri	1,596,718	302,942	1,485,637	280,677	93.04%	92.65%	31.62	31.49
Budaun	3,069,426	646,756	2,402,152	501,684	78.26%	77.57%	35.12	34.81
Bareilly	3,618,589	719,217	2,345,325	453,827	64.81%	63.10%	33.13	32.25
Pilibhit	1,645,183	324,528	1,173,317	234,313	71.32%	72.20%	32.88	33.28
Shahjahanpur	2,547,855	502,037	2,028,913	401,998	79.63%	80.07%	32.84	33.02
Kheri	3,207,232	636,038	2,482,852	486,361	77.41%	76.47%	33.05	32.65
Sitapur	3,619,661	713,356	2,898,247	559,623	80.07%	78.45%	32.85	32.18
Hardoi	3,398,306	660,875	2,930,439	565,362	86.23%	85.55%	32.41	32.15
Unnao	2,700,324	476,318	2,397,705	419,090	88.79%	87.99%	29.40	29.13
Lucknow	3,647,834	547,950	2,852,721	428,117	78.20%	78.13%	25.04	25.01
Rae Bareli	2,872,335	530,789	2,526,010	464,033	87.94%	87.42%	30.80	30.62
Farrukhabad	1,570,408	288,157	1,326,118	241,387	84.44%	83.77%	30.58	30.34
Kannauj	1,388,923	260,165	1,164,479	214,091	83.84%	82.29%	31.22	30.64
Etawah	1,338,871	237,193	1,233,025	218,121	92.09%	91.96%	29.53	29.48
Auraiya	1,179,993	214,780	1,089,991	196,185	92.37%	91.34%	30.34	30.00
Kanpur Dehat	1,563,336	280,435	1,410,225	249,845	90.21%	89.09%	29.90	29.53
Kanpur Nagar	4,167,999	591,301	3,448,024	485,154	82.73%	82.05%	23.64	23.45
Jalaun	1,454,452	242,309	1,299,829	213,923	89.37%	88.29%	27.77	27.43
Jhansi	1,744,931	280,589	1,592,741	257,339	91.28%	91.71%	26.80	26.93
Lalitpur	977,734	200,349	926,441	192,395	94.75%	96.03%	34.15	34.61
Hamirpur	1,043,724	188,740	959,438	173,757	91.92%	92.06%	30.14	30.18
Mahoba	708,447	134,725	659,538	126,031	93.10%	93.55%	31.69	31.85
Banda	1,537,334	303,479	1,408,201	276,666	91.60%	91.16%	32.90	32.74
Chitrakoot	766,225	161,968	737,219	155,676	96.21%	96.12%	35.23	35.19
Fatehpur	2,308,384	421,136	1,997,175	363,893	86.52%	86.41%	30.41	30.37
Pratapgarh	2,731,174	512,097	2,345,857	434,624	85.89%	84.87%	31.25	30.88
Kaushambi	1,293,154	265,503	1,116,223	231,970	86.32%	87.37%	34.22	34.64
Allahabad	4,936,105	899,583	4,284,834	785,508	86.81%	87.32%	30.37	30.55
Barabanki	2,673,581	514,820	2,072,421	391,939	77.51%	76.13%	32.09	31.52
Faizabad	2,088,928	382,447	1,778,749	322,662	85.15%	84.37%	30.51	30.23
Ambedkar Nagar	2,026,876	393,180	1,689,067	324,906	83.33%	82.64%	32.33	32.06
Sultanpur	3,214,832	616,861	2,676,468	504,252	83.25%	81.74%	31.98	31.40
Bahraich	2,381,072	487,118	1,537,177	299,112	64.56%	61.40%	34.10	32.43
Shrawasti	1,176,391	235,122	872,653	166,884	74.18%	70.98%	33.31	31.87
Balrampur	1,682,350	339,432	1,058,676	205,150	62.93%	60.44%	33.63	32.30
Gonda	2,765,586	536,566	2,225,700	420,621	80.48%	78.39%	32.34	31.50
Siddharthnagar	2,040,085	435,014	1,428,543	298,267	70.02%	68.56%	35.54	34.80
Basti	2,084,814	406,881	1,762,973	337,455	84.56%	82.94%	32.53	31.90
Sant Kabir Nagar	1,420,226	293,402	1,073,646	216,795	75.60%	73.89%	34.43	33.65
Mahrajganj	2,173,878	457,699	1,793,304	371,697	82.49%	81.21%	35.09	34.54
Gorakhpur	3,769,456	694,213	3,407,412	627,481	90.40%	90.39%	30.69	30.69
Kushinagar	2,893,196	586,465	2,394,602	474,941	82.77%	80.98%	33.78	33.06
Deoria	2,712,650	515,597	2,398,395	449,901	88.42%	87.26%	31.68	31.26
Azamgarh	3,939,916	796,410	3,332,711	664,806	84.59%	83.48%	33.69	33.25
Mau	1,853,997	373,910	1,494,344	296,601	80.60%	79.32%	33.61	33.08
Ballia	2,761,620	516,976	2,572,597	480,029	93.16%	92.85%	31.20	31.10
Jaunpur	3,911,679	783,771	3,484,557	693,491	89.08%	88.48%	33.39	33.17
Ghazipur	3,037,582	611,330	2,722,780	546,949	89.64%	89.47%	33.54	33.48
Chandauli	1,643,251	328,365	1,470,369	291,888	89.48%	88.89%	33.30	33.09
Varanasi	3,138,671	575,882	2,627,565	474,342	83.72%	82.37%	30.58	30.09
Sant Ravidas Nagar Bhadohi	1,353,705	273,535	1,187,835	239,174	87.75%	87.44%	33.68	33.56
Mirzapur	2,116,042	425,405	1,953,169	391,702	92.30%	92.08%	33.51	33.42
Sonbhadra	1,463,519	302,834	1,375,219	284,659	93.97%	94.00%	34.49	34.50
Bihar	82,998,509	16,806,063	69,076,919	13,753,272	83.23%	81.84%	33.75	33.18
Pashchim Champaran	3,043,466	648,358	2,373,310	493,805	77.98%	76.16%	35.51	34.68
Purba Champaran	3,939,773	837,642	3,181,386	666,968	80.75%	79.62%	35.44	34.94
Sheohar	515,961	106,442	435,121	88,795	84.33%	83.42%	34.38	34.01
Sitamarhi	2,682,720	556,582	2,111,476	430,680	78.71%	77.38%	34.58	34.00
Madhubani	3,575,281	725,999	2,930,501	579,470	81.97%	79.82%	33.84	32.96
Supaul	1,732,578	367,302	1,426,108	295,842	82.31%	80.54%	35.33	34.57
Araria	2,158,608	474,181	1,263,766	264,726	58.55%	55.83%	36.61	34.91
Kishanganj	1,296,348	287,937	412,995	82,520	31.86%	28.66%	37.02	33.30
Purnia	2,543,942	549,690	1,584,796	324,969	62.30%	59.12%	36.01	34.18
Katihar	2,392,638	525,449	1,363,523	279,742	56.99%	53.24%	36.60	34.19
Madhepura	1,526,646	330,409	1,351,978	289,556	88.56%	87.64%	36.07	35.70
Saharsa	1,508,182	316,930	1,289,364	267,372	85.49%	84.36%	35.02	34.56
Darbhanga	3,295,789	662,205	2,543,284	502,886	77.17%	75.94%	33.49	32.96
Muzaffarpur	3,746,714	741,706	3,168,225	617,838	84.56%	83.30%	32.99	32.50
Gopalganj	2,152,638	433,668	1,784,275	355,335	82.89%	81.94%	33.58	33.19
Siwan	2,714,349	549,611	2,218,632	445,727	81.74%	81.10%	33.75	33.48
Saran	3,248,701	647,273	2,909,213	576,823	89.55%	89.12%	33.21	33.05
Vaishali	2,718,421	543,235	2,457,636	488,365	90.41%	89.90%	33.31	33.12
Samastipur	3,394,793	711,168	3,035,755	630,285	89.42%	88.63%	34.91	34.60
Begusarai	2,349,366	481,118	2,033,039	409,769	86.54%	85.17%	34.13	33.59
Khagaria	1,280,354	278,691	1,147,346	247,196	89.61%	88.70%	36.28	35.91
Bhagalpur	2,423,172	472,126	1,990,976	383,930	82.16%	81.32%	32.47	32.14
Banka	1,608,773	327,903	1,409,352	283,565	87.60%	86.48%	33.97	33.53
Munger	1,137,797	205,735	1,045,233	187,645	91.86%	91.21%	30.14	29.92
Lakhisarai	802,225	169,320	766,232	161,325	95.51%	95.28%	35.18	35.09
Sheikhpura	525,502	109,782	487,021	102,506	92.68%	93.37%	34.82	35.08
Nalanda	2,370,528	461,240	2,191,552	428,442	92.45%	92.89%	32.43	32.58
Patna	4,718,592	818,994	4,333,556	756,390	91.84%	92.36%	28.93	29.09
Bhojpur	2,243,144	423,242	2,076,589	390,439	92.57%	92.25%	31.45	31.34
Buxar	1,402,396	271,849	1,309,181	252,339	93.35%	92.82%	32.31	32.12
Kaimur (Bhabua)	1,289,074	269,812	1,161,779	241,742	90.13%	89.60%	34.88	34.68
Rohtas	2,450,748	484,359	2,199,049	431,913	89.73%	89.17%	32.94	32.73
Jehanabad	1,514,315	294,345	1,389,053	270,046	91.73%	91.74%	32.40	32.40
Aurangabad	2,013,055	398,602	1,814,612	359,529	90.14%	90.20%	33.00	33.02
Gaya	3,473,428	687,369	3,063,841	608,097	88.21%	88.47%	32.98	33.08
Nawada	1,809,696	359,410	1,604,223	318,880	88.65%	88.72%	33.10	33.13
Jamui	1,398,796	276,379	1,212,941	237,815	86.71%	86.05%	32.93	32.68
Sikkim	540,851	78,195	329,548	47,994	60.93%	61.38%	24.10	24.27
North	41,030	5,958	16,128	2,241	39.31%	37.61%	24.20	23.16
West	123,256	20,153	71,886	11,735	58.32%	58.23%	27.25	27.21
South	131,525	20,674	84,213	13,339	64.03%	64.52%	26.20	26.40
East	245,040	31,410	157,321	20,679	64.20%	65.84%	21.36	21.91
Arunachal Pradesh	1,097,968	205,871	379,935	65,046	34.60%	31.60%	31.25	28.53
Tawang	38,924	6,515	8,440	740	21.68%	11.36%	27.90	14.61
West Kameng	74,599	12,569	32,125	4,725	43.06%	37.59%	28.08	24.51
East Kameng	57,179	12,060	9,943	1,572	17.39%	13.03%	35.15	26.35
Papum Pare	122,003	21,051	51,026	7,432	41.82%	35.30%	28.76	24.28
Lower Subansiri	98,244	18,012	10,493	1,555	10.68%	8.63%	30.56	24.70
Upper Subansiri	55,346	10,897	5,572	783	10.07%	7.19%	32.81	23.42
West Siang	103,918	17,801	17,711	2,526	17.04%	14.19%	28.55	23.77
East Siang	87,397	15,780	26,352	4,501	30.15%	28.52%	30.09	28.47
Upper Siang	33,363	6,396	6,116	949	18.33%	14.84%	31.95	25.86
Dibang Valley	57,720	10,424	31,700	5,630	54.92%	54.01%	30.10	29.60
Lohit	143,527	28,596	103,151	20,328	71.87%	71.09%	33.21	32.85
Changlang	125,422	25,486	50,183	9,587	40.01%	37.62%	33.87	31.84
Tirap	100,326	20,284	27,123	4,718	27.03%	23.26%	33.70	28.99
Nagaland	1,990,036	289,678	153,162	19,411	7.70%	6.70%	24.26	21.12
Mon	260,652	38,994	9,963	1,221	3.82%	3.13%	24.93	20.43
Tuensang	414,818	58,981	6,856	713	1.65%	1.21%	23.70	17.33
Mokokchung	232,085	23,575	10,433	952	4.50%	4.04%	16.93	15.21
Zunheboto	153,955	25,287	3,193	276	2.07%	1.09%	27.37	14.41
Wokha	161,223	21,931	4,787	566	2.97%	2.58%	22.67	19.71
Dimapur	309,024	46,929	91,885	12,604	29.73%	26.86%	25.31	22.86
Kohima	310,084	46,894	21,950	2,586	7.08%	5.51%	25.20	19.64
Phek	148,195	27,087	4,095	493	2.76%	1.82%	30.46	20.07
Manipur	2,166,788	308,585	996,894	131,840	46.01%	42.72%	23.74	22.04
Senapati	156,513	21,895	30,441	4,322	19.45%	19.74%	23.32	23.66
Tamenglong	111,499	15,599	3,187	152	2.86%	0.97%	23.32	7.95
Churachandpur	227,905	30,879	10,538	996	4.62%	3.23%	22.58	15.75
Bishnupur	208,368	31,191	148,903	21,040	71.46%	67.46%	24.95	23.55
Thoubal	364,140	59,827	221,096	32,800	60.72%	54.82%	27.38	24.73
Imphal West	444,382	56,400	330,994	40,191	74.48%	71.26%	21.15	20.24
Imphal East	394,876	55,622	240,347	30,886	60.87%	55.53%	23.48	21.42
Ukhrul	140,778	21,037	5,687	621	4.04%	2.95%	24.91	18.20
Chandel	118,327	16,135	5,701	832	4.82%	5.16%	22.73	24.32
Mizoram	888,573	143,734	31,562	2,891	3.55%	2.01%	26.96	15.27
Mamit	62,785	11,170	2,404	343	3.83%	3.07%	29.65	23.78
Kolasib	65,960	10,566	4,237	486	6.42%	4.60%	26.70	19.12
Aizawl	325,676	46,223	14,508	1,460	4.45%	3.16%	23.65	16.77
Champhai	108,392	18,433	2,248	75	2.07%	0.41%	28.34	5.56
Serchhip	53,861	9,108	531	44	0.99%	0.48%	28.18	13.81
Lunglei	137,223	23,052	4,612	326	3.36%	1.41%	28.00	11.78
Lawngtlai	73,620	13,991	1,910	88	2.59%	0.63%	31.67	7.68
Saiha	61,056	11,191	1,112	69	1.82%	0.62%	30.55	10.34
Tripura	3,199,203	436,446	2,739,310	354,750	85.62%	81.28%	22.74	21.58
West Tripura	1,532,982	192,899	1,373,556	164,456	89.60%	85.25%	20.97	19.96
South Tripura	767,440	110,028	660,641	91,292	86.08%	82.97%	23.90	23.03
Dhalai	307,868	47,902	257,834	39,177	83.75%	81.79%	25.93	25.32
North Tripura	590,913	85,617	447,279	59,825	75.69%	69.88%	24.15	22.29
Meghalaya	2,318,822	467,979	307,822	43,665	13.27%	9.33%	33.64	23.64
West Garo Hills	518,390	101,026	111,528	17,173	21.51%	17.00%	32.48	25.66
East Garo Hills	250,582	51,182	14,113	2,199	5.63%	4.30%	34.04	25.97
South Garo Hills	100,980	21,314	4,880	641	4.83%	3.01%	35.18	21.89
West Khasi Hills	296,049	69,333	5,661	995	1.91%	1.44%	39.03	29.29
Ri Bhoi	192,790	42,546	29,117	4,623	15.10%	10.87%	36.78	26.46
East Khasi Hills	660,923	115,169	129,373	15,669	19.57%	13.61%	29.04	20.19
Jaintia Hills	299,108	67,409	13,150	2,365	4.40%	3.51%	37.56	29.97
Assam	26,655,528	4,498,075	17,296,455	2,508,702	64.89%	55.77%	28.12	24.17
Kokrajhar	905,764	162,841	594,168	96,619	65.60%	59.33%	29.96	27.10
Dhubri	1,637,344	340,182	405,065	56,021	24.74%	16.47%	34.63	23.05
Goalpara	822,035	159,133	314,157	45,589	38.22%	28.65%	32.26	24.19
Bongaigaon	904,835	163,401	535,464	77,999	59.18%	47.73%	30.10	24.28
Barpeta	1,647,201	308,949	662,066	87,085	40.19%	28.19%	31.26	21.92
Kamrup	2,522,324	353,779	1,836,153	226,127	72.80%	63.92%	23.38	20.53
Nalbari	1,148,824	170,213	873,749	116,780	76.06%	68.61%	24.69	22.28
Darrang	1,504,320	268,762	868,532	125,370	57.74%	46.65%	29.78	24.06
Marigaon	776,256	148,758	405,302	62,550	52.21%	42.05%	31.94	25.72
Nagaon	2,314,629	426,280	1,106,354	151,067	47.80%	35.44%	30.69	22.76
Sonitpur	1,681,513	273,825	1,287,646	191,735	76.58%	70.02%	27.14	24.82
Lakhimpur	889,010	150,312	702,881	109,298	79.06%	72.71%	28.18	25.92
Dhemaji	571,944	99,545	548,780	95,018	95.95%	95.45%	29.01	28.86
Tinsukia	1,150,062	184,845	1,029,142	164,911	89.49%	89.22%	26.79	26.71
Dibrugarh	1,185,072	172,631	1,075,878	156,937	90.79%	90.91%	24.28	24.31
Sibsagar	1,051,736	149,098	927,706	132,549	88.21%	88.90%	23.63	23.81
Jorhat	999,221	133,888	927,858	124,581	92.86%	93.05%	22.33	22.38
Golaghat	946,279	142,970	813,263	121,935	85.94%	85.29%	25.18	24.99
Karbi Anglong	813,311	150,230	670,139	122,816	82.40%	81.75%	30.79	30.54
North Cachar Hills	188,079	30,807	131,492	21,586	69.91%	70.07%	27.30	27.36
Cachar	1,444,921	229,219	886,761	124,288	61.37%	54.22%	26.44	23.36
Karimganj	1,007,976	177,431	470,708	63,690	46.70%	35.90%	29.34	22.55
Hailakandi	542,872	100,976	223,191	34,151	41.11%	33.82%	31.00	25.50
West Bengal	80,176,197	11,414,222	58,104,835	7,375,023	72.47%	64.61%	23.73	21.15
Darjiling	1,609,172	204,643	1,237,714	155,910	76.92%	76.19%	21.20	20.99
Jalpaiguri	3,401,173	521,287	2,833,229	419,361	83.30%	80.45%	25.54	24.67
Koch Bihar	2,479,155	387,130	1,871,857	270,279	75.50%	69.82%	26.03	24.07
Uttar Dinajpur	2,441,794	513,266	1,263,001	221,654	51.72%	43.19%	35.03	29.25
Dakshin Dinajpur *	1,503,178	246,034	1,112,575	170,742	74.01%	69.40%	27.28	25.58
Maldah	3,290,468	639,904	1,621,468	275,197	49.28%	43.01%	32.41	28.29
Murshidabad	5,866,569	1,044,534	2,107,469	306,550	35.92%	29.35%	29.67	24.24
Birbhum	3,015,422	488,193	1,944,606	285,205	64.49%	58.42%	26.98	24.44
Barddhaman	6,895,514	903,438	5,440,052	677,889	78.89%	75.03%	21.84	20.77
Nadia	4,604,827	606,395	3,396,095	404,503	73.75%	66.71%	21.95	19.85
North 24 Parganas	8,934,286	1,054,338	6,721,420	690,821	75.23%	65.52%	19.67	17.13
Hugli	5,041,976	603,258	4,216,701	476,215	83.63%	78.94%	19.94	18.82
Bankura	3,192,695	458,882	2,693,022	375,353	84.35%	81.80%	23.95	23.23
Puruliya	2,536,516	408,803	2,116,037	333,660	83.42%	81.62%	26.86	26.28
Medinipur	9,610,788	1,380,497	8,224,779	1,123,118	85.58%	81.36%	23.94	22.76
Haora	4,273,099	513,218	3,204,077	332,610	74.98%	64.81%	20.02	17.30
Kolkata	4,572,876	390,282	3,552,274	274,129	77.68%	70.24%	14.22	12.86
South 24 Parganas	6,906,689	1,050,120	4,548,459	581,827	65.86%	55.41%	25.34	21.32
Jharkhand	26,945,829	4,956,827	18,475,681	3,305,386	68.57%	66.68%	30.66	29.82
Garhwa	1,035,464	226,883	867,775	188,155	83.81%	82.93%	36.52	36.14
Palamu	2,098,359	429,130	1,740,948	355,335	82.97%	82.80%	34.08	34.02
Chatra	791,434	166,367	687,846	144,302	86.91%	86.74%	35.03	34.96
Hazaribagh	2,277,475	424,446	1,870,586	344,262	82.13%	81.11%	31.06	30.67
Kodarma	499,403	101,912	421,358	84,436	84.37%	82.85%	34.01	33.40
Giridih	1,904,430	404,811	1,475,201	306,229	77.46%	75.65%	35.43	34.60
Deoghar	1,165,390	227,752	910,409	169,403	78.12%	74.38%	32.57	31.01
Godda	1,047,939	204,371	745,237	140,467	71.11%	68.73%	32.50	31.41
Sahibganj	927,770	194,340	522,620	102,988	56.33%	52.99%	34.91	32.84
Pakaur	701,664	143,947	320,632	61,339	45.70%	42.61%	34.19	31.88
Dumka	1,759,602	318,436	1,323,468	231,777	75.21%	72.79%	30.16	29.19
Dhanbad	2,397,102	384,265	1,944,757	302,583	81.13%	78.74%	26.72	25.93
Bokaro	1,777,662	291,148	1,491,855	238,910	83.92%	82.06%	27.30	26.69
Ranchi	2,785,064	461,085	1,399,301	215,809	50.24%	46.80%	27.59	25.70
Lohardaga	364,521	72,022	104,089	18,430	28.56%	25.59%	32.93	29.51
Gumla	1,346,767	248,576	440,373	80,362	32.70%	32.33%	30.76	30.41
Pashchimi Singhbhum	2,082,795	374,029	890,741	141,216	42.77%	37.76%	29.93	26.42
Purbi Singhbhum	1,982,988	283,307	1,318,485	179,383	66.49%	63.32%	23.81	22.68
Odisha	36,804,660	5,358,810	34,726,129	5,001,544	94.35%	93.33%	24.27	24.00
Bargarh	1,346,336	174,490	1,327,967	172,038	98.64%	98.59%	21.60	21.59
Jharsuguda	509,716	66,859	490,127	64,108	96.16%	95.89%	21.86	21.80
Sambalpur	935,613	125,433	873,795	115,668	93.39%	92.21%	22.34	22.06
Debagarh	274,108	42,352	261,544	40,082	95.42%	94.64%	25.75	25.54
Sundargarh	1,830,673	264,988	1,431,762	201,336	78.21%	75.98%	24.12	23.44
Kendujhar	1,561,990	243,655	1,525,874	237,372	97.69%	97.42%	26.00	25.93
Mayurbhanj	2,223,456	364,717	1,859,639	299,309	83.64%	82.07%	27.34	26.83
Baleshwar	2,024,508	296,087	1,937,765	280,293	95.72%	94.67%	24.38	24.11
Bhadrak	1,333,749	192,647	1,248,486	176,880	93.61%	91.82%	24.07	23.61
Kendrapara	1,302,005	174,956	1,257,156	167,288	96.56%	95.62%	22.40	22.18
Jagatsinghapur	1,057,629	124,550	1,014,872	117,763	95.96%	94.55%	19.63	19.34
Cuttack	2,341,094	286,820	2,199,526	266,002	93.95%	92.74%	20.42	20.16
Jajapur	1,624,341	218,371	1,543,317	204,756	95.01%	93.77%	22.41	22.11
Dhenkanal	1,066,878	145,857	1,060,943	145,064	99.44%	99.46%	22.79	22.79
Anugul	1,140,003	163,943	1,127,926	162,251	98.94%	98.97%	23.97	23.97
Nayagarh	864,516	113,180	859,219	112,397	99.39%	99.31%	21.82	21.80
Khordha	1,877,395	230,471	1,798,214	218,801	95.78%	94.94%	20.46	20.28
Puri	1,502,682	188,558	1,459,872	181,415	97.15%	96.21%	20.91	20.71
Ganjam	3,160,635	475,464	3,132,628	470,959	99.11%	99.05%	25.07	25.06
Gajapati	518,837	92,686	341,308	56,973	65.78%	61.47%	29.77	27.82
Kandhamal	648,201	117,298	527,757	91,221	81.42%	77.77%	30.16	28.81
Baudh	373,372	61,042	372,070	60,898	99.65%	99.76%	27.25	27.28
Sonapur	541,835	77,259	538,472	76,750	99.38%	99.34%	23.76	23.76
Balangir	1,337,194	191,674	1,312,924	188,810	98.19%	98.51%	23.89	23.97
Nuapada	530,690	84,521	523,309	83,545	98.61%	98.85%	26.54	26.61
Kalahandi	1,335,494	217,889	1,322,363	215,844	99.02%	99.06%	27.19	27.20
Rayagada	831,109	145,493	770,572	133,234	92.72%	91.57%	29.18	28.82
Nabarangapur	1,025,766	187,048	991,639	181,293	96.67%	96.92%	30.39	30.47
Koraput	1,180,637	200,689	1,119,527	190,856	94.82%	95.10%	28.33	28.41
Malkangiri	504,198	89,813	495,556	88,338	98.29%	98.36%	29.69	29.71
Chhattisgarh	20,833,803	3,554,916	19,729,670	3,386,939	94.70%	95.27%	28.44	28.61
Koriya	586,327	100,269	549,179	94,536	93.66%	94.28%	28.50	28.69
Surguja	1,972,094	377,936	1,823,285	350,723	92.45%	92.80%	31.94	32.06
Jashpur	743,160	122,934	559,984	93,602	75.35%	76.14%	27.57	27.86
Raigarh	1,265,529	201,555	1,212,180	192,509	95.78%	95.51%	26.54	26.47
Korba	1,011,823	171,840	949,774	162,137	93.87%	94.35%	28.31	28.45
Janjgir	1,317,431	224,792	1,299,831	222,266	98.66%	98.88%	28.44	28.50
Bilaspur	1,998,355	348,030	1,904,580	334,369	95.31%	96.07%	29.03	29.26
Kawardha	584,552	111,271	554,542	105,909	94.87%	95.18%	31.73	31.83
Rajnandgaon	1,283,224	217,244	1,215,492	207,917	94.72%	95.71%	28.22	28.51
Durg	2,810,436	438,094	2,654,202	417,847	94.44%	95.38%	25.98	26.24
Raipur	3,016,930	515,582	2,881,933	497,324	95.53%	96.46%	28.48	28.76
Mahasamund	860,257	136,705	838,906	133,935	97.52%	97.97%	26.49	26.61
Dhamtari	706,591	116,514	689,554	114,196	97.59%	98.01%	27.48	27.60
Kanker	650,934	106,879	633,925	104,095	97.39%	97.40%	27.37	27.37
Bastar	1,306,673	232,205	1,265,787	226,098	96.87%	97.37%	29.62	29.77
Dantewada	719,487	133,066	696,516	129,476	96.81%	97.30%	30.82	30.98
Madhya Pradesh	60,348,023	10,782,214	55,004,675	9,884,804	91.15%	91.68%	29.78	29.95
Sheopur	559,495	112,229	519,697	104,361	92.89%	92.99%	33.43	33.47
Morena	1,592,714	298,581	1,523,438	285,074	95.65%	95.48%	31.24	31.19
Bhind	1,428,559	254,887	1,339,646	238,652	93.78%	93.63%	29.74	29.69
Gwalior	1,632,109	255,076	1,470,346	229,224	90.09%	89.86%	26.05	25.98
Datia	628,240	108,451	593,927	102,177	94.54%	94.21%	28.77	28.67
Shivpuri	1,441,950	282,253	1,374,040	270,548	95.29%	95.85%	32.62	32.82
Guna	1,666,767	326,684	1,554,490	308,097	93.26%	94.31%	32.67	33.03
Tikamgarh	1,202,998	229,493	1,150,150	220,840	95.61%	96.23%	31.79	32.00
Chhatarpur	1,474,723	289,345	1,404,412	277,501	95.23%	95.91%	32.70	32.93
Panna	856,558	171,060	820,662	164,472	95.81%	96.15%	33.28	33.40
Sagar	2,021,987	369,804	1,868,720	345,924	92.42%	93.54%	30.48	30.85
Damoh	1,083,949	195,984	1,015,688	185,497	93.70%	94.65%	30.13	30.44
Satna	1,870,104	345,813	1,811,634	335,899	96.87%	97.13%	30.82	30.90
Rewa	1,973,306	374,637	1,900,712	361,111	96.32%	96.39%	31.64	31.66
Umaria	515,963	97,729	493,821	93,959	95.71%	96.14%	31.57	31.71
Shahdol	1,575,303	267,881	1,505,070	257,103	95.54%	95.98%	28.34	28.47
Sidhi	1,831,152	377,361	1,760,525	361,584	96.14%	95.82%	34.35	34.23
Neemuch	726,070	116,406	651,244	104,895	89.69%	90.11%	26.72	26.84
Mandsaur	1,183,724	196,638	1,054,413	174,863	89.08%	88.93%	27.69	27.64
Ratlam	1,215,393	213,869	1,056,199	188,695	86.90%	88.23%	29.33	29.78
Ujjain	1,710,982	278,787	1,484,134	241,545	86.74%	86.64%	27.16	27.13
Shajapur	1,290,685	234,576	1,132,623	202,170	87.75%	86.19%	30.29	29.75
Dewas	1,308,223	231,195	1,158,128	203,422	88.53%	87.99%	29.45	29.27
Jhabua	1,394,561	319,601	1,330,834	308,315	95.43%	96.47%	38.20	38.61
Dhar	1,740,329	338,623	1,632,299	319,627	93.79%	94.39%	32.43	32.64
Indore	2,465,827	369,546	2,066,384	308,464	83.80%	83.47%	24.98	24.88
West Nimar	1,529,562	291,137	1,409,370	269,515	92.14%	92.57%	31.72	31.87
Barwani	1,081,441	237,771	1,026,644	228,186	94.93%	95.97%	36.64	37.04
East Nimar	1,713,134	309,511	1,438,583	260,341	83.97%	84.11%	30.11	30.16
Rajgarh	1,254,085	232,329	1,166,394	214,078	93.01%	92.14%	30.88	30.59
Vidisha	1,214,857	231,348	1,071,618	203,738	88.21%	88.07%	31.74	31.69
Bhopal	1,843,510	288,916	1,346,829	212,215	73.06%	73.45%	26.12	26.26
Sehore	1,078,912	205,301	961,700	181,961	89.14%	88.63%	31.71	31.53
Raisen	1,125,154	212,279	1,009,511	190,806	89.72%	89.88%	31.44	31.50
Betul	1,395,175	234,885	1,340,631	227,625	96.09%	96.91%	28.06	28.30
Harda	474,416	86,990	441,743	81,207	93.11%	93.35%	30.56	30.64
Hoshangabad	1,084,265	175,882	1,025,978	167,345	94.62%	95.15%	27.04	27.18
Katni	1,064,167	190,717	1,021,106	184,180	95.95%	96.57%	29.87	30.06
Jabalpur	2,151,203	306,656	1,891,876	270,530	87.95%	88.22%	23.76	23.83
Narsimhapur	957,646	153,821	912,409	147,058	95.28%	95.60%	26.77	26.86
Dindori	580,730	97,506	465,958	77,923	80.24%	79.92%	27.98	27.87
Mandla	894,236	144,395	784,274	125,605	87.70%	86.99%	26.91	26.69
Chhindwara	1,849,283	298,484	1,713,457	279,999	92.66%	93.81%	26.90	27.24
Seoni	1,166,608	196,869	962,741	160,384	82.52%	81.47%	28.13	27.77
Balaghat	1,497,968	230,908	1,340,617	208,089	89.50%	90.12%	25.69	25.87
Gujarat	50,671,017	7,532,404	45,143,074	6,706,286	89.09%	89.03%	24.78	24.76
Kachchh	1,583,225	254,448	1,223,254	189,546	77.26%	74.49%	26.79	25.83
Banas Kantha	2,504,244	468,394	2,314,123	436,761	92.41%	93.25%	31.17	31.46
Patan	1,182,709	190,192	1,057,013	170,289	89.37%	89.54%	26.80	26.85
Mahesana	1,837,892	258,139	1,714,171	239,273	93.27%	92.69%	23.41	23.26
Sabar Kantha	2,082,531	324,716	1,946,780	304,795	93.48%	93.87%	25.99	26.09
Gandhinagar	1,334,455	185,696	1,269,766	176,624	95.15%	95.11%	23.19	23.18
Ahmadabad	5,816,519	769,666	4,921,747	649,829	84.62%	84.43%	22.05	22.01
Surendranagar	1,515,148	247,294	1,392,451	229,918	91.90%	92.97%	27.20	27.52
Rajkot	3,169,881	427,184	2,841,302	381,664	89.63%	89.34%	22.46	22.39
Jamnagar	1,904,278	274,268	1,605,941	227,085	84.33%	82.80%	24.00	23.57
Porbandar	536,835	76,099	507,176	71,700	94.48%	94.22%	23.63	23.56
Junagadh	2,448,173	369,691	2,165,734	322,003	88.46%	87.10%	25.17	24.78
Amreli	1,393,918	198,657	1,307,460	185,115	93.80%	93.18%	23.75	23.60
Bhavnagar	2,469,630	401,780	2,264,062	370,803	91.68%	92.29%	27.11	27.30
Anand	1,856,872	255,231	1,616,127	221,732	87.03%	86.88%	22.91	22.87
Kheda	2,024,216	296,430	1,775,214	259,935	87.70%	87.69%	24.41	24.40
Panch Mahals	2,025,277	341,284	1,897,034	319,791	93.67%	93.70%	28.09	28.10
Dohad	1,636,433	333,948	1,571,017	323,659	96.00%	96.92%	34.01	34.34
Vadodara	3,641,802	493,196	3,258,593	440,828	89.48%	89.38%	22.57	22.55
Narmada	514,404	80,968	482,552	76,130	93.81%	94.02%	26.23	26.29
Bharuch	1,370,656	194,025	1,059,796	149,690	77.32%	77.15%	23.59	23.54
Surat	4,995,174	699,672	4,350,795	600,667	87.10%	85.85%	23.34	23.01
The Dangs	186,729	36,547	165,436	32,470	88.60%	88.84%	32.62	32.71
Navsari	1,229,463	149,283	1,135,525	138,187	92.36%	92.57%	20.24	20.28
Valsad	1,410,553	205,596	1,300,005	187,792	92.16%	91.34%	24.29	24.08
Dadra and Nagar Haveli and Daman and Diu								
Diu	44,215	7,554	41,235	7,182	93.26%	95.08%	28.47	29.03
Daman	113,989	13,024	100,666	11,486	88.31%	88.19%	19.04	19.02
Dadra and Nagar Haveli	220,490	40,199	206,203	37,719	93.52%	93.83%	30.39	30.49
Maharashtra	96,878,627	13,671,126	77,859,385	10,869,476	80.37%	79.51%	23.52	23.27
Nandurbar	1,311,709	230,213	1,198,481	212,040	91.37%	92.11%	29.25	29.49
Dhule	1,707,947	255,231	1,522,895	224,249	89.17%	87.86%	24.91	24.54
Jalgaon	3,682,690	525,668	3,049,368	418,615	82.80%	79.63%	23.79	22.88
Buldana	2,232,480	340,294	1,622,192	235,708	72.66%	69.27%	25.40	24.22
Akola	1,630,239	235,835	1,024,080	137,396	62.82%	58.26%	24.11	22.36
Washim	1,020,216	160,486	746,841	115,450	73.20%	71.94%	26.22	25.76
Amravati	2,607,160	357,834	1,883,148	253,784	72.23%	70.92%	22.88	22.46
Wardha	1,236,736	155,612	1,006,235	127,993	81.36%	82.25%	20.97	21.20
Nagpur	4,067,637	525,850	3,090,588	400,720	75.98%	76.20%	21.55	21.61
Bhandara	1,136,146	154,051	953,507	131,228	83.92%	85.18%	22.60	22.94
Gondiya	1,200,707	171,191	1,041,802	149,839	86.77%	87.53%	23.76	23.97
Gadchiroli	970,294	154,744	818,640	130,989	84.37%	84.65%	26.58	26.67
Chandrapur	2,071,101	279,490	1,680,113	229,457	81.12%	82.10%	22.49	22.76
Yavatmal	2,458,271	369,402	1,999,368	299,748	81.33%	81.14%	25.04	24.99
Nanded	2,876,259	477,303	2,162,185	351,079	75.17%	73.55%	27.66	27.06
Hingoli	987,160	167,098	728,893	120,975	73.84%	72.40%	28.21	27.66
Parbhani	1,527,715	252,435	1,121,246	178,715	73.39%	70.80%	27.54	26.56
Jalna	1,612,980	261,386	1,255,041	197,917	77.81%	75.72%	27.01	26.28
Aurangabad	2,897,013	467,934	2,030,181	315,200	70.08%	67.36%	26.92	25.88
Nashik	4,993,796	789,398	4,306,179	671,368	86.23%	85.05%	26.35	25.98
Thane	8,131,849	1,144,896	6,506,337	915,147	80.01%	79.93%	23.47	23.44
Mumbai (Suburban)	8,640,419	1,024,700	5,953,475	673,128	68.90%	65.69%	19.77	18.84
Mumbai	3,338,031	339,723	2,119,750	202,848	63.50%	59.71%	16.96	15.95
Raigarh	2,207,929	314,767	1,916,707	272,125	86.81%	86.45%	23.76	23.66
Pune	7,232,555	968,851	6,197,349	827,755	85.69%	85.44%	22.33	22.26
Ahmadnagar	4,040,642	589,706	3,664,259	532,286	90.69%	90.26%	24.32	24.21
Bid	2,161,250	335,283	1,827,298	278,027	84.55%	82.92%	25.86	25.36
Latur	2,080,285	326,777	1,700,679	259,782	81.75%	79.50%	26.18	25.46
Osmanabad	1,486,586	223,183	1,297,858	191,666	87.30%	85.88%	25.02	24.61
Solapur	3,849,543	569,609	3,386,955	499,218	87.98%	87.64%	24.66	24.57
Satara	2,808,994	368,531	2,533,359	331,945	90.19%	90.07%	21.87	21.84
Ratnagiri	1,696,777	236,601	1,391,137	194,670	81.99%	82.28%	23.24	23.32
Sindhudurg	868,825	105,518	802,498	96,988	92.37%	91.92%	20.24	20.14
Kolhapur	3,523,162	449,883	3,077,263	393,459	87.34%	87.46%	21.28	21.31
Sangli	2,583,524	341,643	2,243,478	297,962	86.84%	87.21%	22.04	22.14
Andhra Pradesh	76,210,007	10,171,857	67,836,651	8,960,285	89.01%	88.09%	22.25	22.01
Adilabad	2,488,003	376,768	2,207,843	328,614	88.74%	87.22%	25.24	24.81
Nizamabad	2,345,685	337,429	1,983,275	276,262	84.55%	81.87%	23.98	23.22
Karimnagar	3,491,822	465,964	3,251,834	430,340	93.13%	92.35%	22.24	22.06
Medak	2,670,097	402,643	2,334,169	345,555	87.42%	85.82%	25.13	24.67
Hyderabad	3,829,753	486,084	2,121,963	242,235	55.41%	49.83%	21.15	19.03
Rangareddi	3,575,064	500,024	3,063,118	417,600	85.68%	83.52%	23.31	22.72
Mahbubnagar	3,513,934	547,506	3,193,932	498,655	90.89%	91.08%	25.97	26.02
Nalgonda	3,247,982	455,958	3,040,212	426,576	93.60%	93.56%	23.40	23.39
Warangal	3,246,004	452,747	3,028,537	423,399	93.30%	93.52%	23.25	23.30
Khammam	2,578,927	350,150	2,406,066	327,714	93.30%	93.59%	22.63	22.70
Srikakulam	2,537,593	336,093	2,513,087	332,514	99.03%	98.94%	22.07	22.05
Vizianagaram	2,249,254	295,929	2,214,541	291,382	98.46%	98.46%	21.93	21.93
Visakhapatnam	3,832,336	493,124	3,688,280	476,107	96.24%	96.55%	21.45	21.51
East Godavari	4,901,420	613,490	4,752,009	595,287	96.95%	97.03%	20.86	20.88
West Godavari	3,803,517	459,604	3,580,207	431,436	94.13%	93.87%	20.14	20.08
Krishna	4,187,841	498,597	3,729,204	439,424	89.05%	88.13%	19.84	19.64
Guntur	4,465,144	538,285	3,834,204	457,033	85.87%	84.91%	20.09	19.87
Prakasam	3,059,423	389,344	2,825,681	358,562	92.36%	92.09%	21.21	21.15
Nellore	2,668,564	328,412	2,382,701	291,208	89.29%	88.67%	20.51	20.37
Cuddapah	2,601,797	340,663	2,181,572	278,638	83.85%	81.79%	21.82	21.29
Kurnool	3,529,494	537,606	2,910,182	440,019	82.45%	81.85%	25.39	25.20
Anantapur	3,640,478	479,853	3,225,156	422,771	88.59%	88.10%	21.97	21.85
Chittoor	3,745,875	485,584	3,368,878	428,954	89.94%	88.34%	21.61	21.22
Karnataka	52,850,562	7,182,100	44,321,279	5,884,667	83.86%	81.94%	22.65	22.13
Belgaum	4,214,505	624,031	3,565,153	528,864	84.59%	84.75%	24.68	24.72
Bagalkot	1,651,892	264,872	1,424,121	227,182	86.21%	85.77%	26.72	26.59
Bijapur	1,806,918	286,831	1,495,080	234,637	82.74%	81.80%	26.46	26.16
Gulbarga	3,130,922	536,454	2,381,497	404,980	76.06%	75.49%	28.56	28.34
Bidar	1,502,373	241,517	1,020,174	156,720	67.90%	64.89%	26.79	25.60
Raichur	1,669,762	283,068	1,417,051	240,684	84.87%	85.03%	28.25	28.31
Koppal	1,196,089	208,004	1,042,294	181,602	87.14%	87.31%	28.98	29.04
Gadag	971,835	137,835	825,166	115,854	84.91%	84.05%	23.64	23.40
Dharwad	1,604,253	218,262	1,221,335	161,135	76.13%	73.83%	22.68	21.99
Uttara Kannada	1,353,644	173,503	1,132,005	140,650	83.63%	81.06%	21.36	20.71
Haveri	1,439,116	203,712	1,163,323	157,880	80.84%	77.50%	23.59	22.62
Bellary	2,027,140	319,086	1,739,522	274,398	85.81%	85.99%	26.23	26.29
Chitradurga	1,517,896	199,535	1,388,506	181,380	91.48%	90.90%	21.91	21.77
Davanagere	1,790,952	240,275	1,532,714	200,343	85.58%	83.38%	22.36	21.79
Shimoga	1,642,545	208,163	1,401,087	171,887	85.30%	82.57%	21.12	20.45
Udupi	1,112,243	114,581	958,389	96,363	86.17%	84.10%	17.17	16.76
Chikmagalur	1,140,905	138,644	1,004,674	120,291	88.06%	86.76%	20.25	19.96
Tumkur	2,584,711	308,162	2,349,801	273,832	90.91%	88.86%	19.87	19.42
Kolar	2,536,069	336,469	2,196,660	284,215	86.62%	84.47%	22.11	21.56
Bangalore	6,537,124	772,540	5,188,807	590,762	79.37%	76.47%	19.70	18.98
Bangalore Rural	1,881,514	225,618	1,693,838	197,109	90.03%	87.36%	19.99	19.39
Mandya	1,763,705	205,147	1,667,640	191,942	94.55%	93.56%	19.39	19.18
Hassan	1,721,669	199,665	1,587,287	181,572	92.19%	90.94%	19.33	19.07
Dakshina Kannada	1,897,730	228,060	1,301,603	137,884	68.59%	60.46%	20.03	17.66
Kodagu	548,561	69,574	450,694	54,507	82.16%	78.34%	21.14	20.16
Mysore	2,641,027	323,555	2,309,267	277,355	87.44%	85.72%	20.42	20.02
Chamarajanagar	965,462	114,937	863,591	100,639	89.45%	87.56%	19.84	19.42
Goa	1,347,668	145,968	886,551	96,941	65.78%	66.41%	18.05	18.22
North Goa	758,573	80,129	576,848	61,022	76.04%	76.15%	17.61	17.63
South Goa	589,095	65,839	309,703	35,919	52.57%	54.56%	18.63	19.33
Lakshdweep	60,650	9,091	2,221	80	3.66%	0.88%	24.98	6.00
Kerala	31,841,374	3,793,146	17,883,449	1,932,504	56.16%	50.95%	19.85	18.01
Kasaragod	1,204,078	159,002	705,234	77,909	58.57%	49.00%	22.01	18.41
Kannur	2,408,956	279,803	1,480,748	146,426	61.47%	52.33%	19.36	16.48
Wayanad	780,619	104,058	392,141	50,834	50.23%	48.85%	22.22	21.61
Kozhikode	2,879,131	347,146	1,669,161	171,316	57.97%	49.35%	20.10	17.11
Malappuram	3,625,471	551,525	1,057,418	133,705	29.17%	24.24%	25.35	21.07
Palakkad	2,617,482	318,884	1,802,766	201,286	68.87%	63.12%	20.30	18.61
Thrissur	2,974,232	332,459	1,761,842	186,528	59.24%	56.11%	18.63	17.65
Ernakulam	3,105,798	338,924	1,444,994	149,739	46.53%	44.18%	18.19	17.27
Idukki	1,129,221	134,177	566,744	66,775	50.19%	49.77%	19.80	19.64
Kottayam	1,953,646	212,622	963,497	102,647	49.32%	48.28%	18.14	17.76
Alappuzha	2,109,160	226,408	1,457,188	151,000	69.09%	66.69%	17.89	17.27
Pathanamthitta	1,234,016	127,024	694,560	71,336	56.28%	56.16%	17.16	17.12
Kollam	2,585,208	292,599	1,685,044	184,395	65.18%	63.02%	18.86	18.24
Thiruvananthapuram	3,234,356	368,515	2,202,112	238,608	68.09%	64.75%	18.99	18.06
Tamil Nadu	62,405,679	7,235,160	54,985,079	6,346,991	88.11%	87.72%	19.32	19.24
Thiruvallur	2,754,756	329,761	2,476,438	295,802	89.90%	89.70%	19.95	19.91
Chennai	4,343,645	433,340	3,573,356	351,806	82.27%	81.18%	16.63	16.41
Kancheepuram	2,877,468	337,259	2,583,590	302,007	89.79%	89.55%	19.53	19.48
Vellore	3,477,317	432,180	3,016,962	368,432	86.76%	85.25%	20.71	20.35
Dharmapuri	2,856,300	386,575	2,690,698	361,848	94.20%	93.60%	22.56	22.41
Tiruvannamalai	2,186,125	261,295	2,041,854	243,167	93.40%	93.06%	19.92	19.85
Viluppuram	2,960,373	373,175	2,726,949	343,756	92.12%	92.12%	21.01	21.01
Salem	3,016,346	351,859	2,883,909	336,447	95.61%	95.62%	19.44	19.44
Namakkal	1,493,462	152,685	1,451,966	147,767	97.22%	96.78%	17.04	16.96
Erode	2,581,500	252,843	2,443,644	237,608	94.66%	93.97%	16.32	16.21
The Nilgiris	762,141	85,860	599,047	66,342	78.60%	77.27%	18.78	18.46
Coimbatore	4,271,856	445,317	3,847,969	396,745	90.08%	89.09%	17.37	17.18
Dindigul	1,923,014	218,918	1,684,808	191,682	87.61%	87.56%	18.97	18.96
Karur	935,686	103,279	883,584	96,694	94.43%	93.62%	18.40	18.24
Tiruchirappalli	2,418,366	270,043	2,040,968	227,748	84.39%	84.34%	18.61	18.60
Perambalur	493,646	60,478	460,058	55,880	93.20%	92.40%	20.42	20.24
Ariyalur	695,524	89,099	650,988	83,639	93.60%	93.87%	21.35	21.41
Cuddalore	2,285,395	284,964	2,105,292	262,756	92.12%	92.21%	20.78	20.80
Nagapattinam	1,488,839	183,346	1,328,144	163,448	89.21%	89.15%	20.52	20.51
Thiruvarur	1,169,474	140,099	1,052,373	125,131	89.99%	89.32%	19.97	19.82
Thanjavur	2,216,138	259,632	1,925,677	223,765	86.89%	86.19%	19.53	19.37
Pudukkottai	1,459,601	183,820	1,294,101	162,117	88.66%	88.19%	20.99	20.88
Sivaganga	1,155,356	132,891	1,026,580	118,536	88.85%	89.20%	19.17	19.24
Madurai	2,578,201	295,276	2,351,019	270,505	91.19%	91.61%	19.09	19.18
Theni	1,093,950	126,127	1,011,456	116,276	92.46%	92.19%	19.22	19.16
Virudhunagar	1,751,301	209,147	1,637,939	195,727	93.53%	93.58%	19.90	19.92
Ramanathapuram	1,187,604	149,587	928,090	114,698	78.15%	76.68%	20.99	20.60
Thoothukkudi	1,572,273	184,411	1,235,498	143,594	78.58%	77.87%	19.55	19.37
Tirunelveli	2,723,988	320,175	2,172,815	252,700	79.77%	78.93%	19.59	19.38
Kanniyakumari	1,676,034	181,719	859,307	90,368	51.27%	49.73%	18.07	17.53
Puducherry	974,345	117,159	845,449	101,730	86.77%	86.83%	20.04	20.05
Yanam	31,394	4,403	30,019	4,226	95.62%	95.98%	23.37	23.46
Pondicherry	735,332	87,232	660,251	78,928	89.79%	90.48%	19.77	19.92
Mahe	36,828	4,176	24,590	2,410	66.77%	57.71%	18.90	16.33
Karaikal	170,791	21,348	130,589	16,166	76.46%	75.73%	20.83	20.63
Andaman and Nicobar Islands	356,152	44,781	246,589	31,301	69.24%	69.90%	20.96	21.16
Andamans	314,084	39,391	235,862	29,921	75.10%	75.96%	20.90	21.14
Nicobars	42,068	5,390	10,727	1,380	25.50%	25.60%	21.35	21.44
