= Hinduism in South India =

Hinduism influence in South India

South Indian Hindus
- States and union territories of South India.

Total population
- 212,563,640 (2011); 84% of the total population

Regions with significant populations
- Tamil Nadu: 63,188,168
- Andhra Pradesh including Telangana: 74,824,149
- Karnataka: 51,317,472
- Kerala: 18,282,492

Religions
- Hinduism Majority: Shaivism; Minority: Vaishnavism, Shaktism and others (including tribal religion and Ayyavazhi)

Hinduism in South India refers to the Hindu culture of the people of South India. Hinduism in South India is characterized by Dravidian customs and traditions, hence it is also called Dravidian Hinduism. The Dravidians made great contributions to the development of Hinduism. South India was the birthplace of many Hindu saints and reformers. The Brahmins (Hindu priests class) of ancient Dakshinapatha (Tamilakam, Telangana, Karnataka including Maharashtra and Gujarat) were classified as Pancha-Dravida (The Five Dravidians). The Hindus in South India are followers of various Hindu branches such as Vaishnavism, Shaivism, Shaktism, Brahmanism and others. Hinduism was the state religion of most of the South Indian kingdoms. During the Ancient and Middle Ages were built in South India one of the greatest Hindu temples. South Indian kings such as the Cholas spread Hinduism overseas to parts of Southeast Asia. The activities of South India across the Palk Strait led to survival of Hinduism in Sri Lanka among the Sri Lankan Tamils. Some Hindu festivals are celebrated mostly or exclusively in South India and Sri Lanka. In South India are also numerous Hindu pilgrimage site that is visited annually by thousands of devotees.

== Hinduism in Ancient South India ==
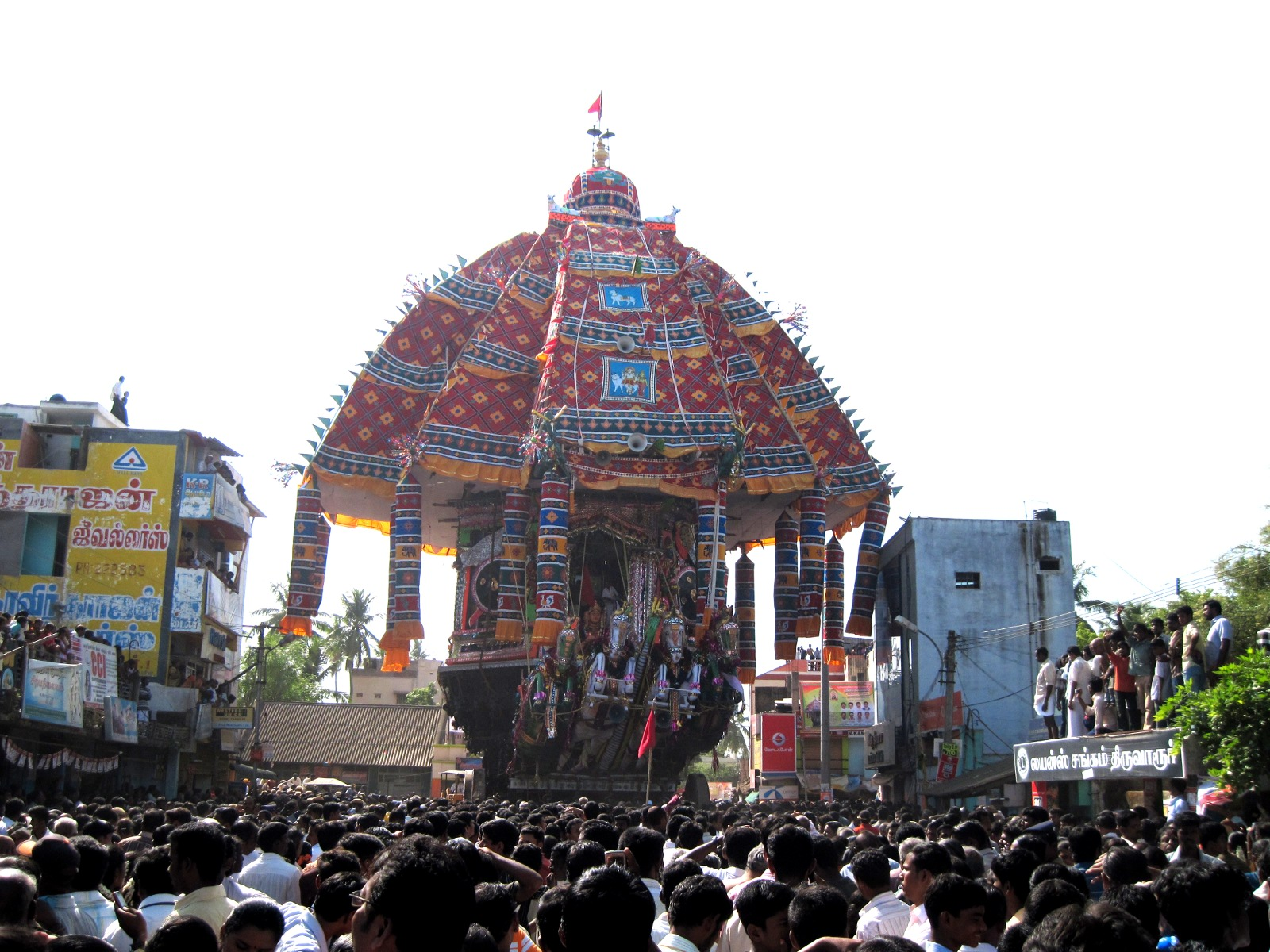
Temple car festival in Tiruvarur.

The Vedic culture in South India has been in some respects the best preserved of ancient Vedic culture and traditions. In North India during late ancient and medieval periods, Buddhism, Sikhism and Islam flourished alongside the Hindu majority. Every intermixing influenced North Indian culture, in particular Islam. The influence of Islam, specifically Sufism, and Sikhism are widespread in the modern-day North Indian society, clearly palpable in linguistics, music, attire, etc. Much of this influence can be attributed to close to a millennium of Muslim rule across North India. Unlike in the North, South India had less outside influence until the advent of European imperialists. As such, the original Hindu traditions are relatively better preserved in South India than in North India.

Tamil literature and Tamil epics and classics have many references to Vedic gods and culture. The Tolkaappiyam, 1st century BCE grammar book, mentions non-Vedic, early-Vedic (Indra, Varuna) and Puranic (Vishnu) gods. The Paripadal (8; 3; 9 etc.), one of the "Eight Anthologies" of poetry (or ettuttokai), has homages to Vishnu, Lakshmi, Brahma, the twelve Adityas, the Ashvins, the Rudras, the Saptarishis, Indra, the Devas etc. The Kural, written by Tiruvalluvar, mentions gods like Indra (25) and Lakshmi (e.g. 167).

The Sangam Tamil epic Silappathikaram, begins with invocations to Chandra, Surya, and Indra, and has homages to Agni, Varuna, Shiva, Subrahmanya, Vishnu-Krishna, Uma, etc. The epic states that "Vedic sacrifices [are] being faultlessly performed" and has many references to Vedic culture and Vedic texts. In the Buddhist work Manimekhalai, the submersion of the city Puhar in Kumari Kandam is attributed to the neglect of the worship to Indra.

== Vedic legends ==
According to the Puranas, the Pandyas, Cholas and Keralas are descendants of the Vedic Turvasha people. According to the Matsya Purana, Manu is considered as a south Indian king. In Hindu tradition the creation of the Tamil language is credited to the Rig Vedic sage Rishi Agastya.

== See also ==
- Hinduism in Tamil Nadu
- Hinduism in Kerala
- Hinduism in Karnataka
- Hinduism in Andhra Pradesh

== Bibliography ==
- Elliot, Charles (2007i). Hinduism and Buddhism. Vol. I (of 3). Echo Library. ISBN 978-1406862959.
- Lochtefeld, James G. (2001l). The Illustrated Encyclopedia of Hinduism, Volume 1. The Rosen Publishing Group, Inc. ISBN 978-0-8239-3179-8.
- Eraly, Abraham (2008i). India: People, Place, Culture, History. Dorling Kindersley Limited. ISBN 978-1-4053-2904-0.
- Bansal, Sunita Pant (2008). Hindu Pilgrimage. Pustak Mahal. ISBN 978-81-223-0997-3.
- Devadevan, Manu V. (2016). A Prehistory of Hinduism. Walter de Gruyter GmbH & Co KG. ISBN 978-3-11-051737-8.
- Nārada (Maha Thera.); Narasimhacharya, Ramanujapuram (1999). The Buddha-Dhamma, Or, the Life and Teachings of the Buddha. Asian Educational Services. p. 8. ISBN 978-81-206-0559-6.
